= List of restaurants in New York City =

This is an incomplete list of notable restaurants in New York City. New York City’s restaurant industry had 23,650 establishments in 2019.

== Restaurants in New York City ==
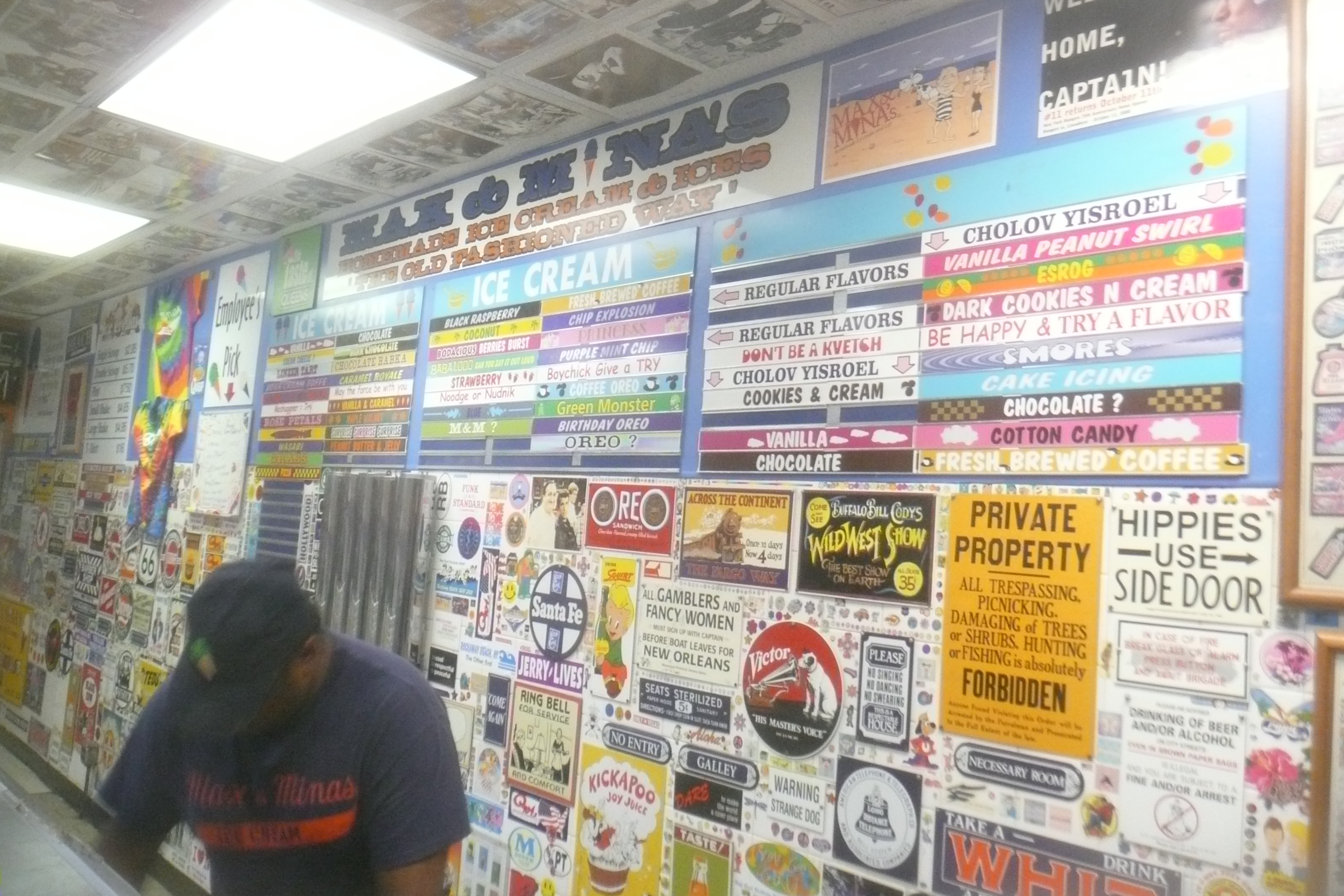
A view of the interior at Max and Mina's ice cream store

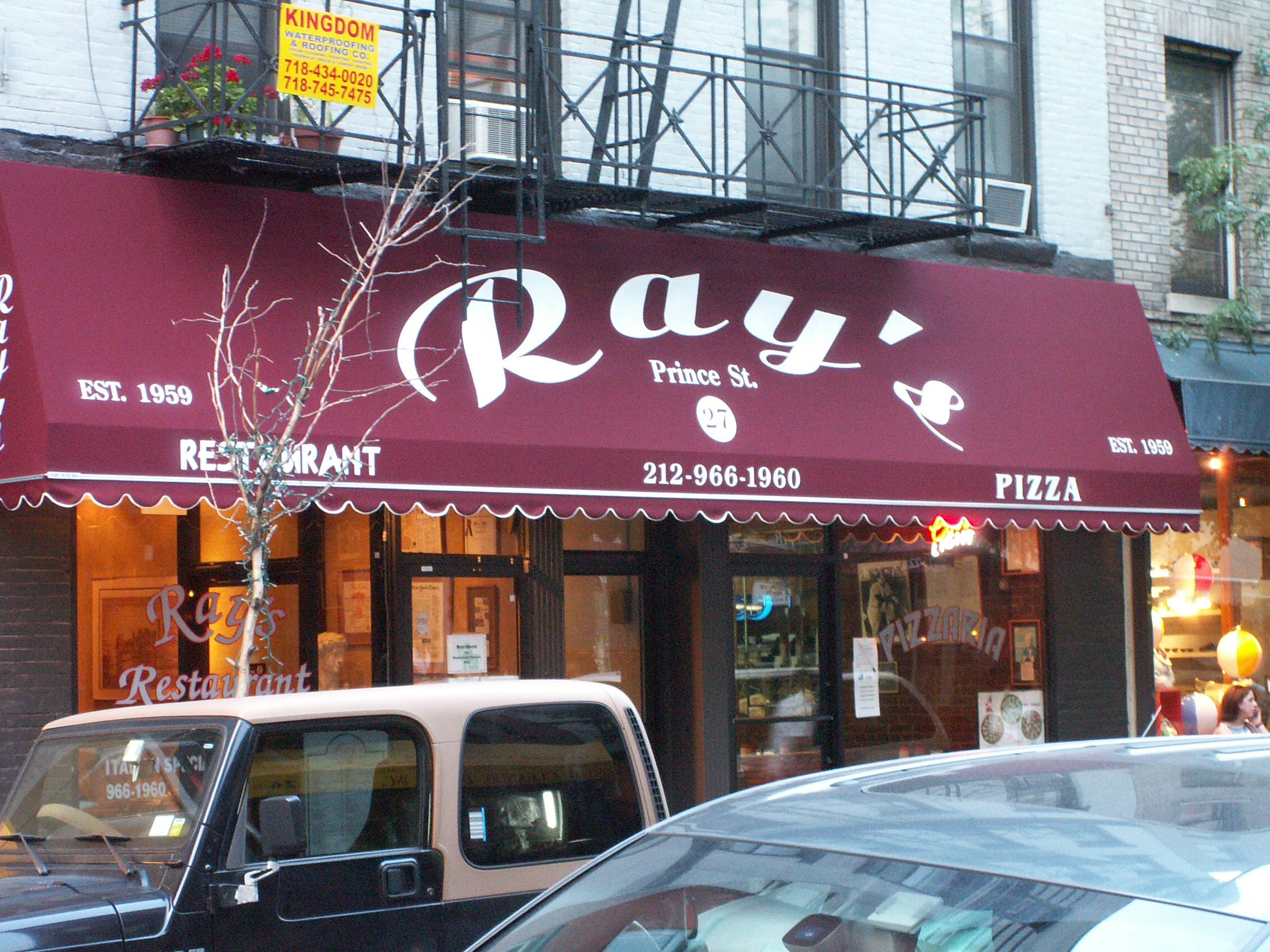
The first Ray's Pizza, at 27 Prince Street on the northern edge of Little Italy, Manhattan

- 54 Below
- Bickford's
- BurritoVille
- Dinosaur Bar-B-Que
- Don Peppe
- Golden Krust Caribbean Bakery & Grill
- The Halal Guys
- El Internacional
- Jackson Hole Burgers
- Jahn's
- Jing Fong
- Joe's Shanghai
- Kennedy Fried Chicken
- Lucciola (Italian restaurant)
- Korilla BBQ
- Mario's
- Max and Mina's
- The Meatball Shop
- Munson Diner
- Old Homestead Steakhouse
- Park Side Restaurant
- Piccolo Cafe
- Ravagh Persian Grill
- T.G.I. Friday's – first location opened in 1965 in New York City
- Xi'an Famous Foods
- Zaro's Bakery
- Zaab Zaab

=== Brooklyn ===
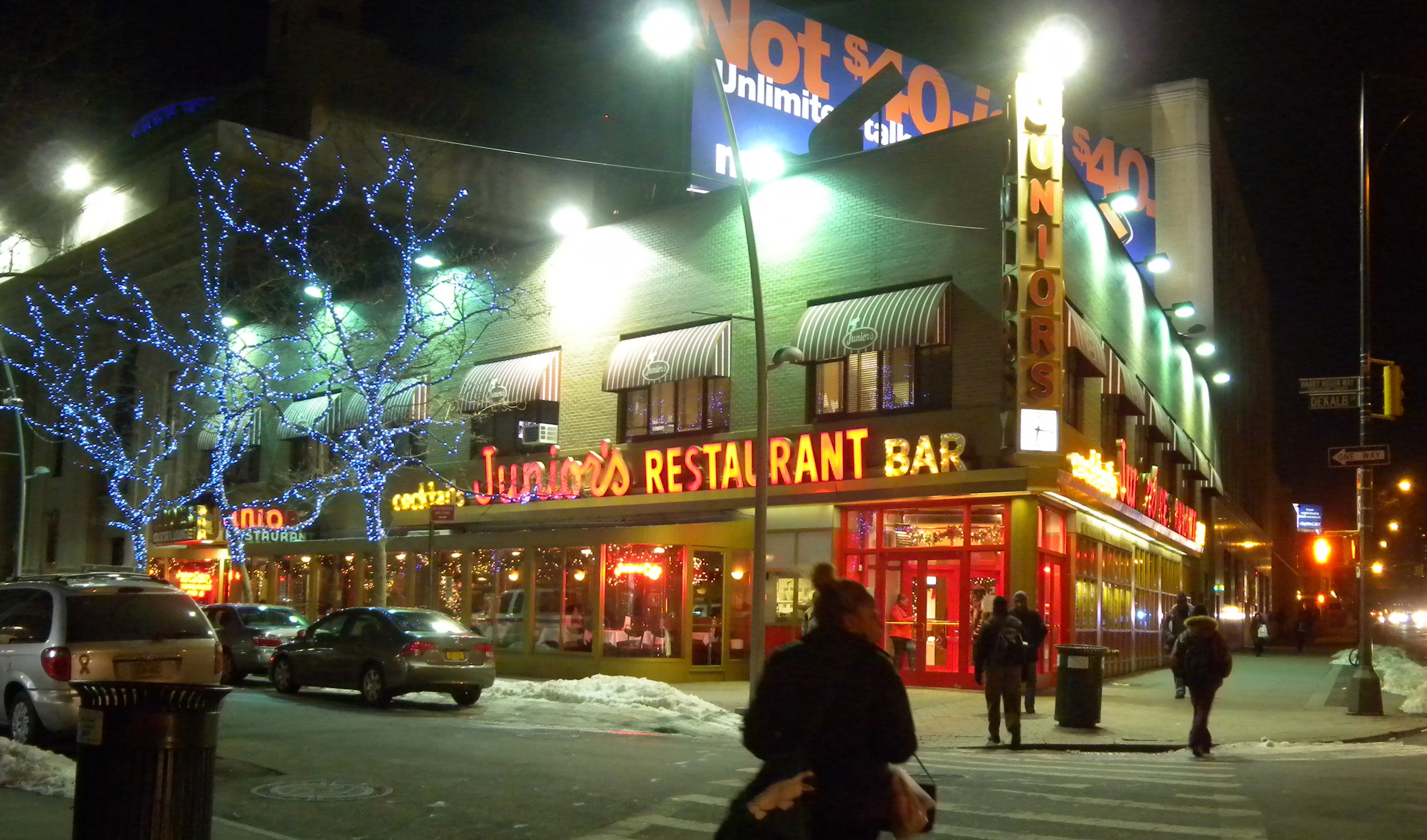
Junior's Restaurant

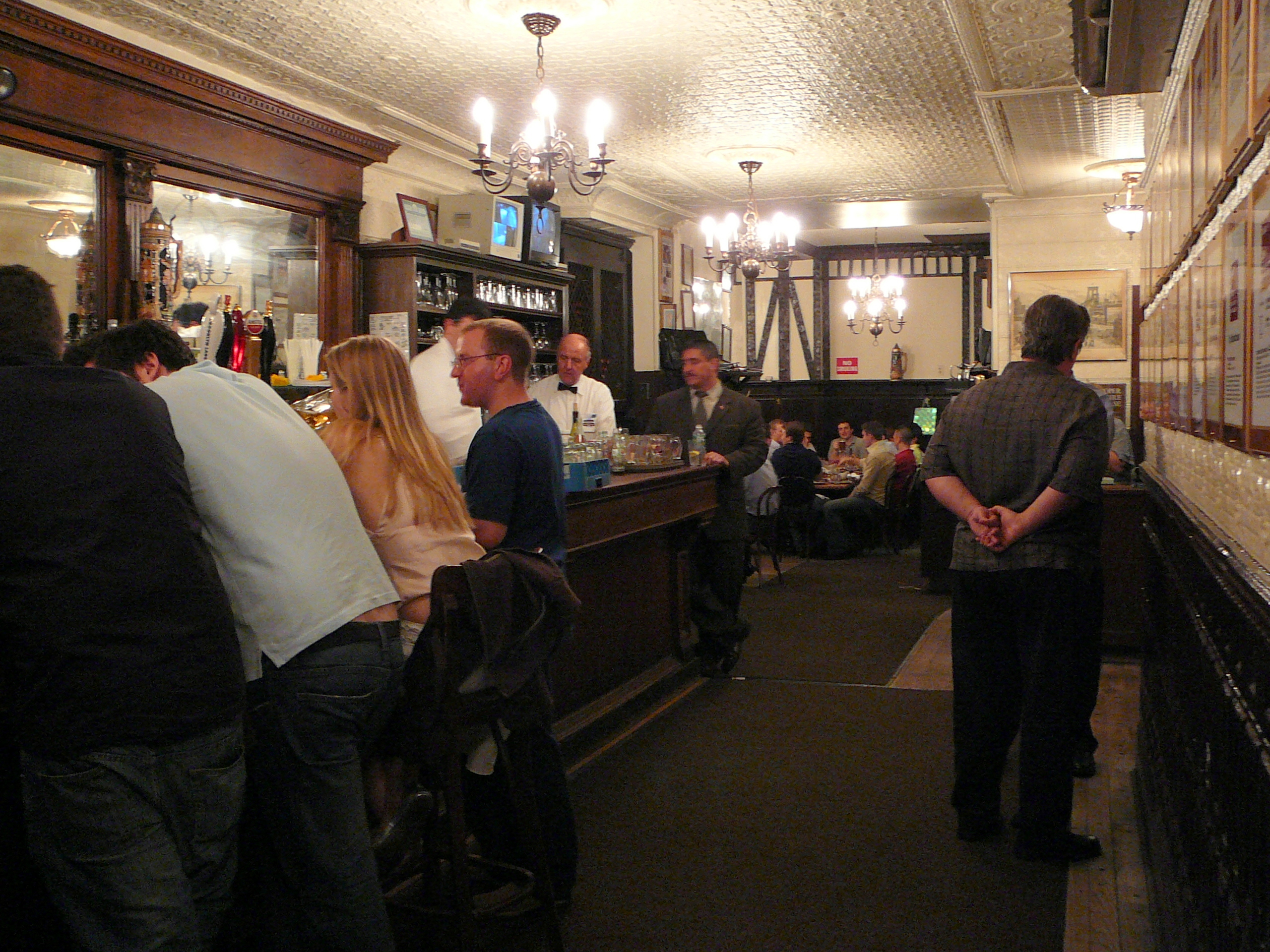
Part of the interior of the Peter Luger Steak House

- Aska
- Bamonte's
- Childs Restaurants (Coney Island Boardwalk location)
- Childs Restaurants (Surf Avenue location)
- Claro
- Clover Hill
- Defonte's
- Francie
- Gargiulo's Italian Restaurant
- Gage and Tollner
- Junior's Restaurant
- Nathan's Famous
- Oxomoco
- Peter Luger Steak House – Brooklyn location was established in 1887 as "Carl Luger's Café, Billiards and Bowling Alley"
- Restaurant Yuu
- The River Café

=== Manhattan ===
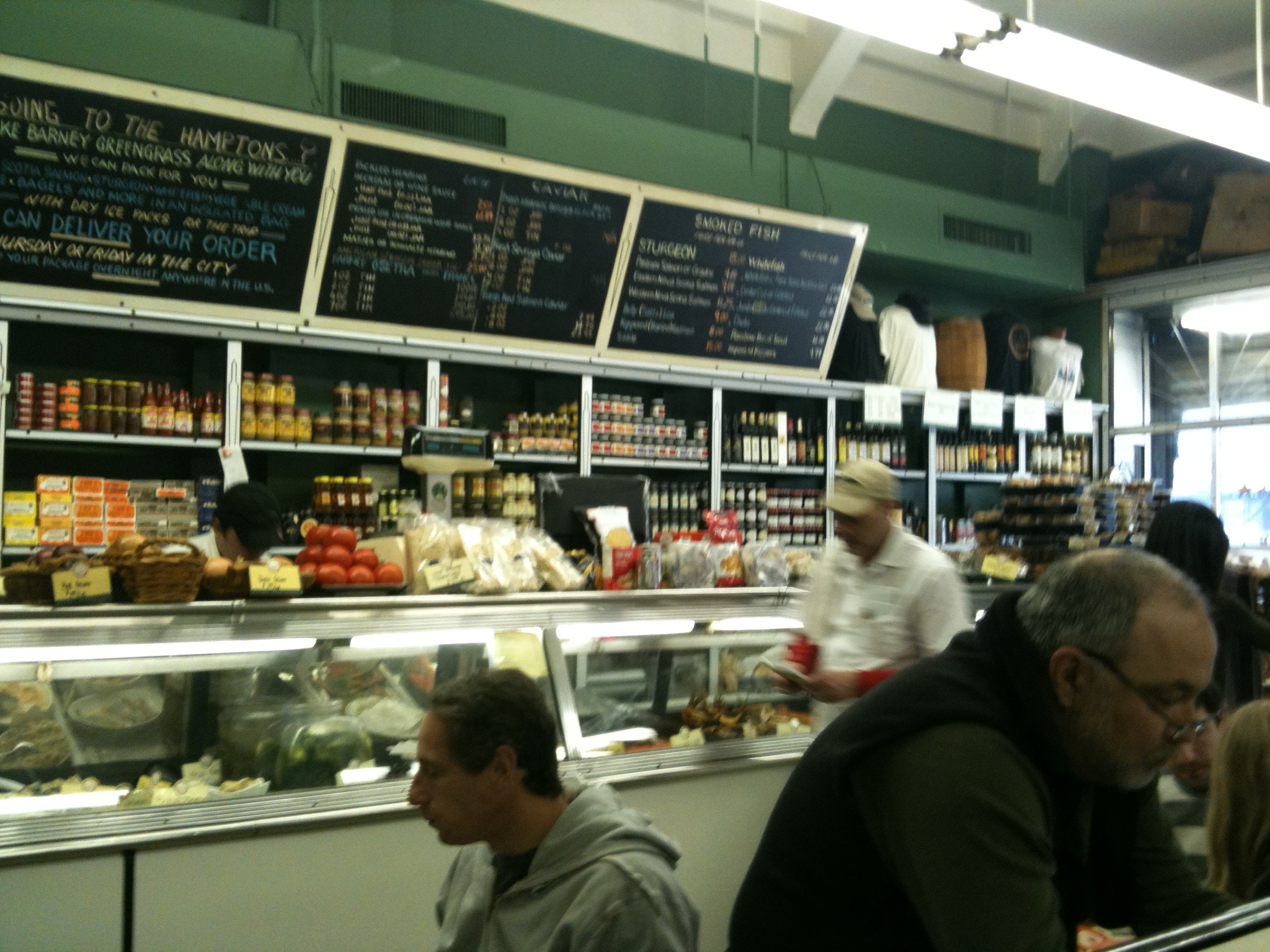
Barney Greengrass

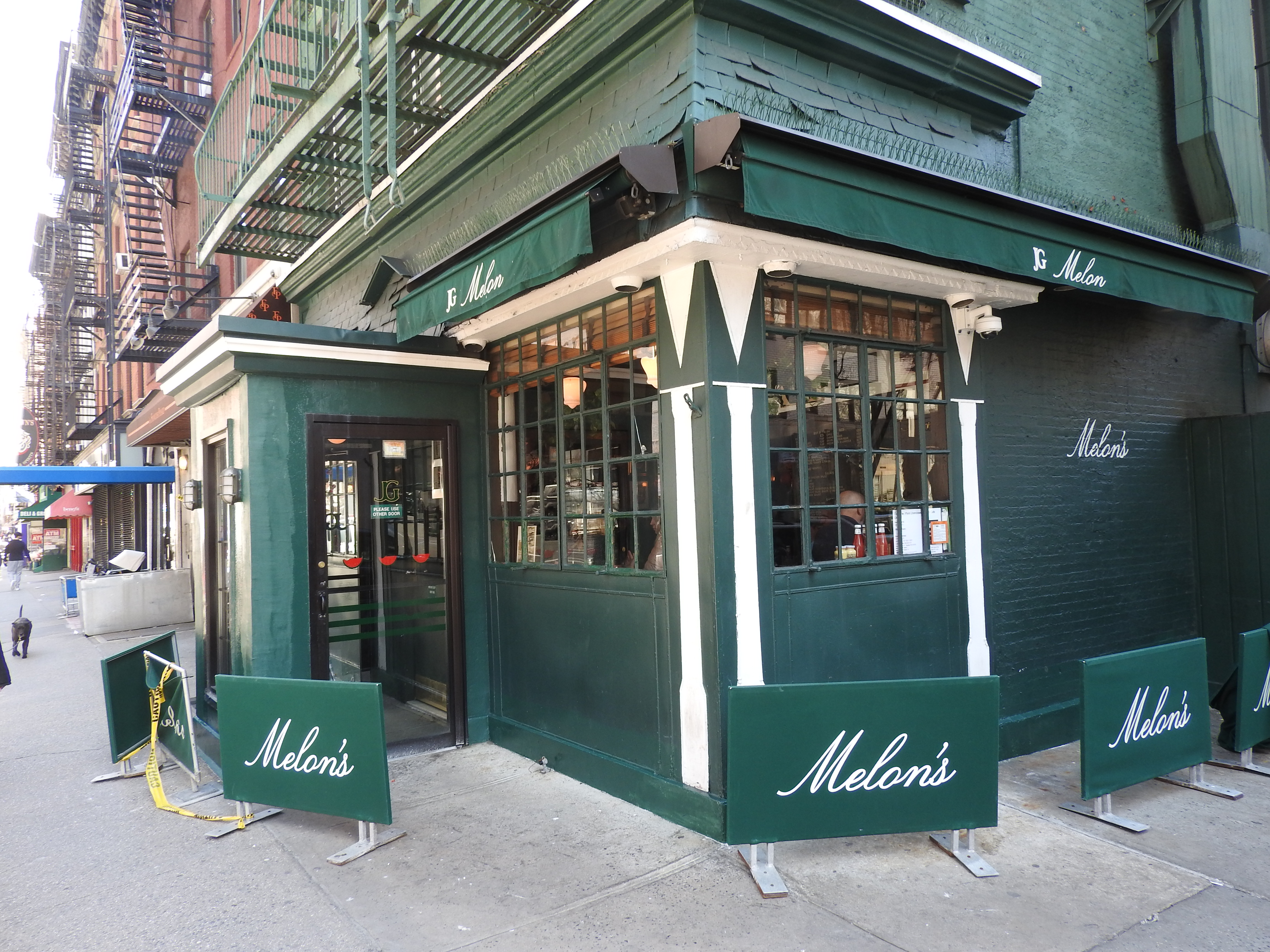
J.G. Melon

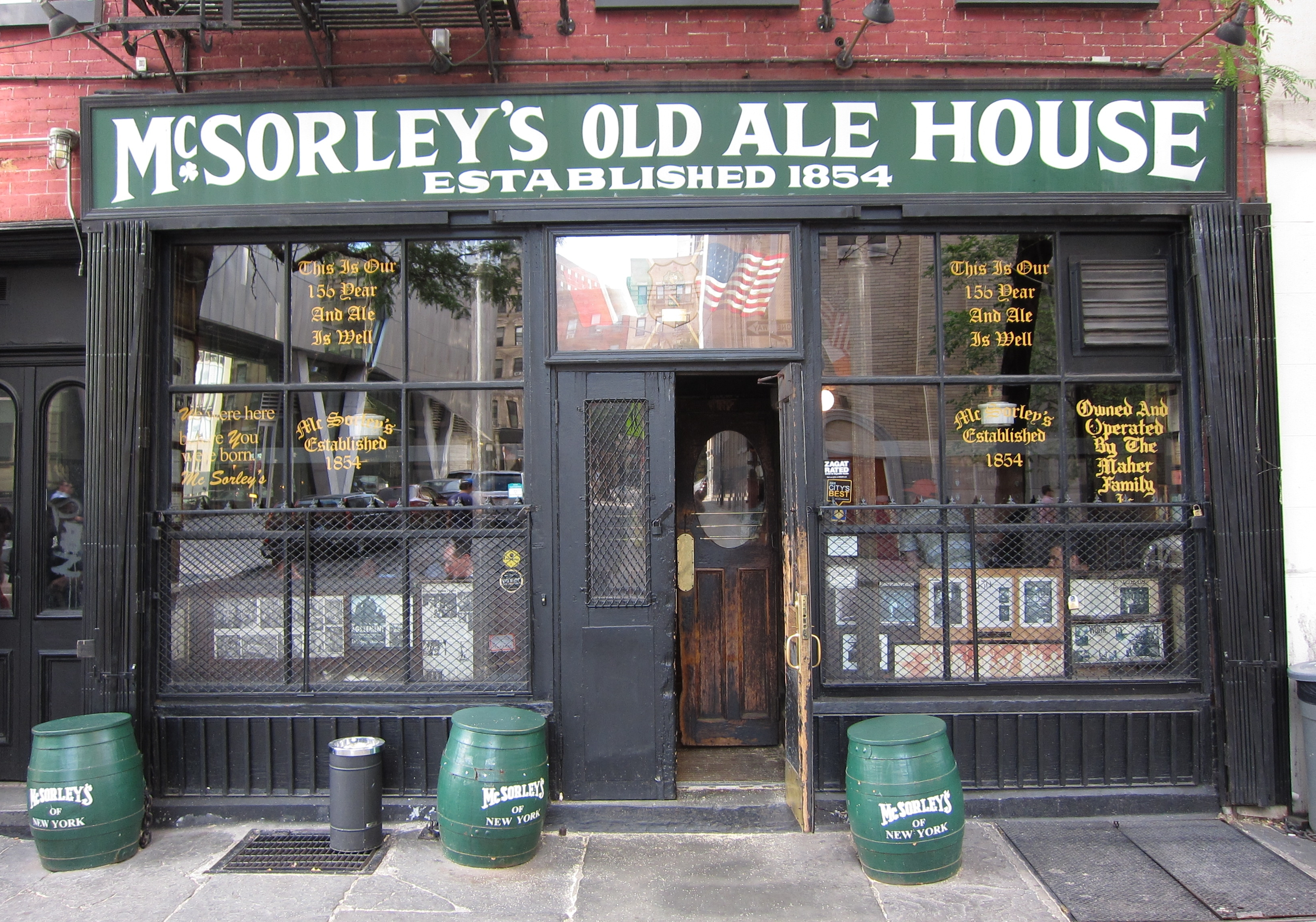
The front of McSorley's Old Ale House in the East Village neighborhood of Manhattan

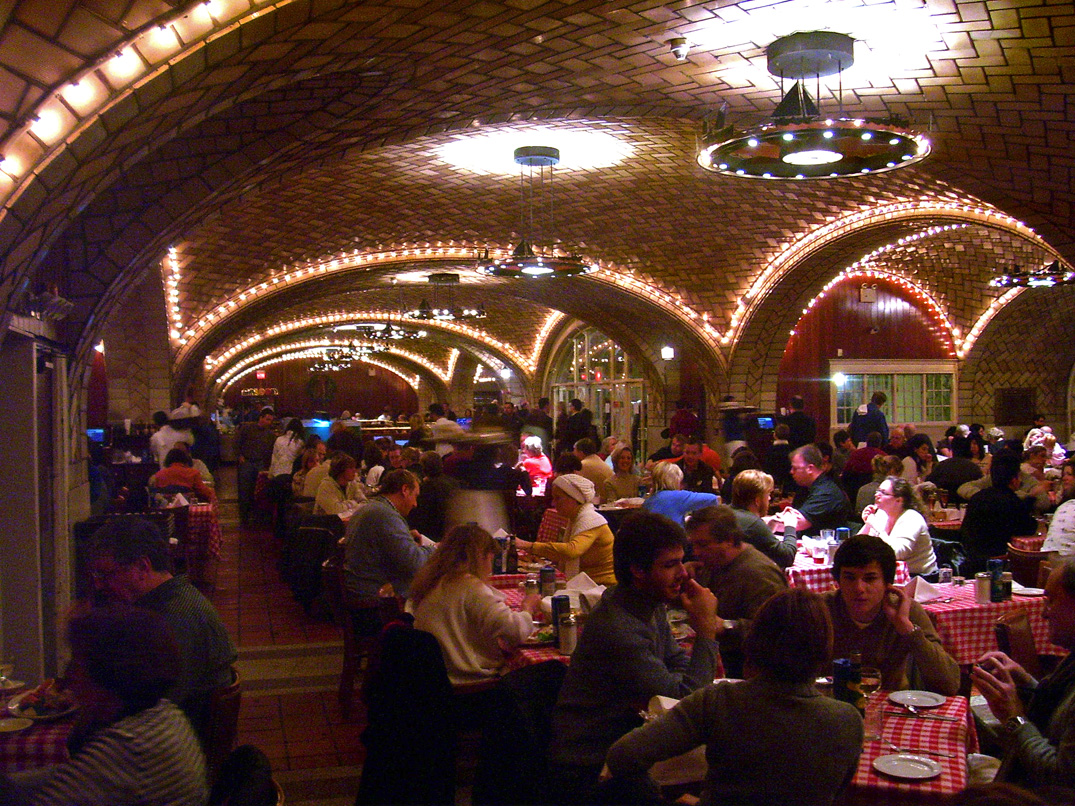
Lunchtime at the Oyster Bar, December 2006

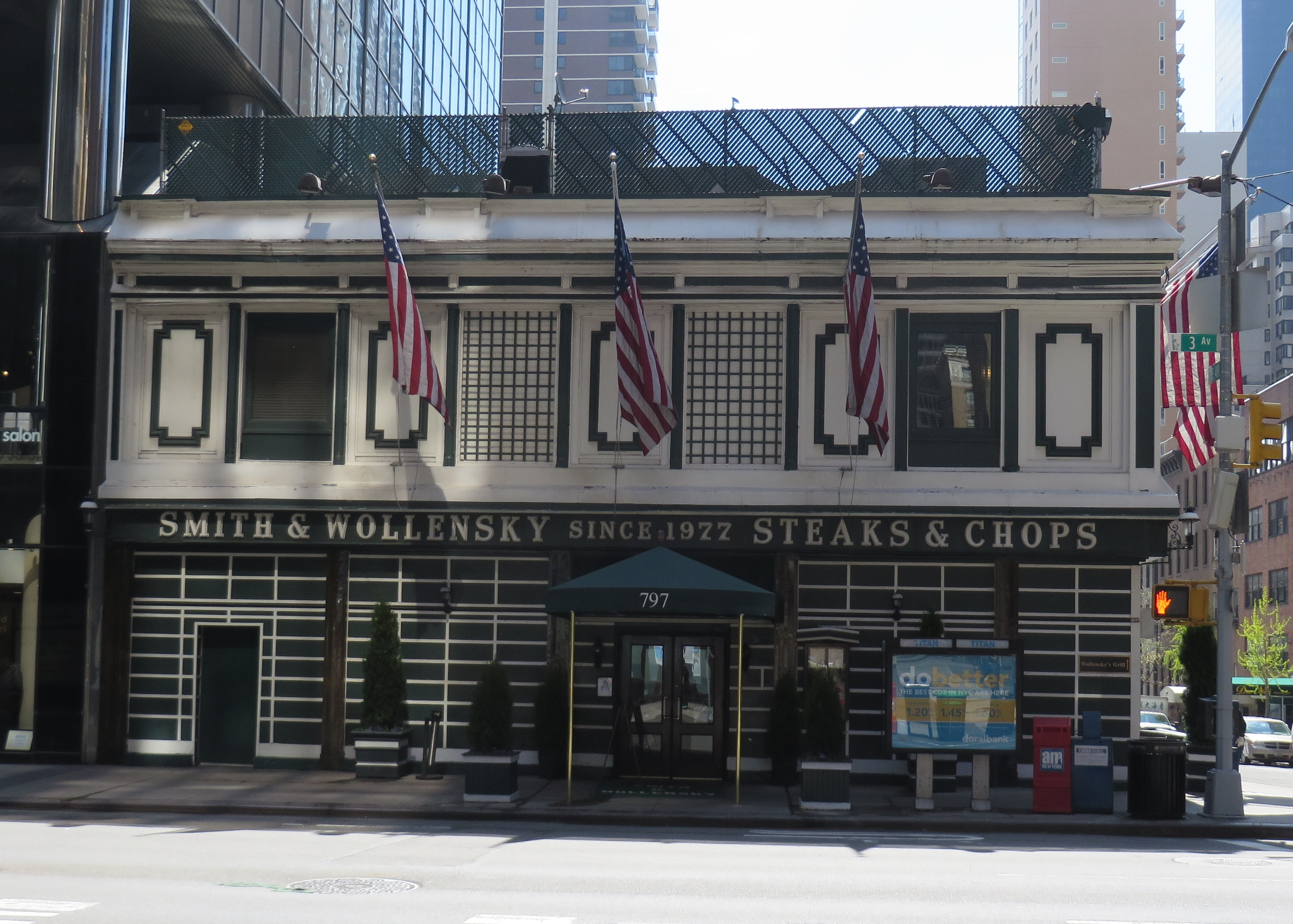
The front of Smith & Wollensky steakhouse in Manhattan

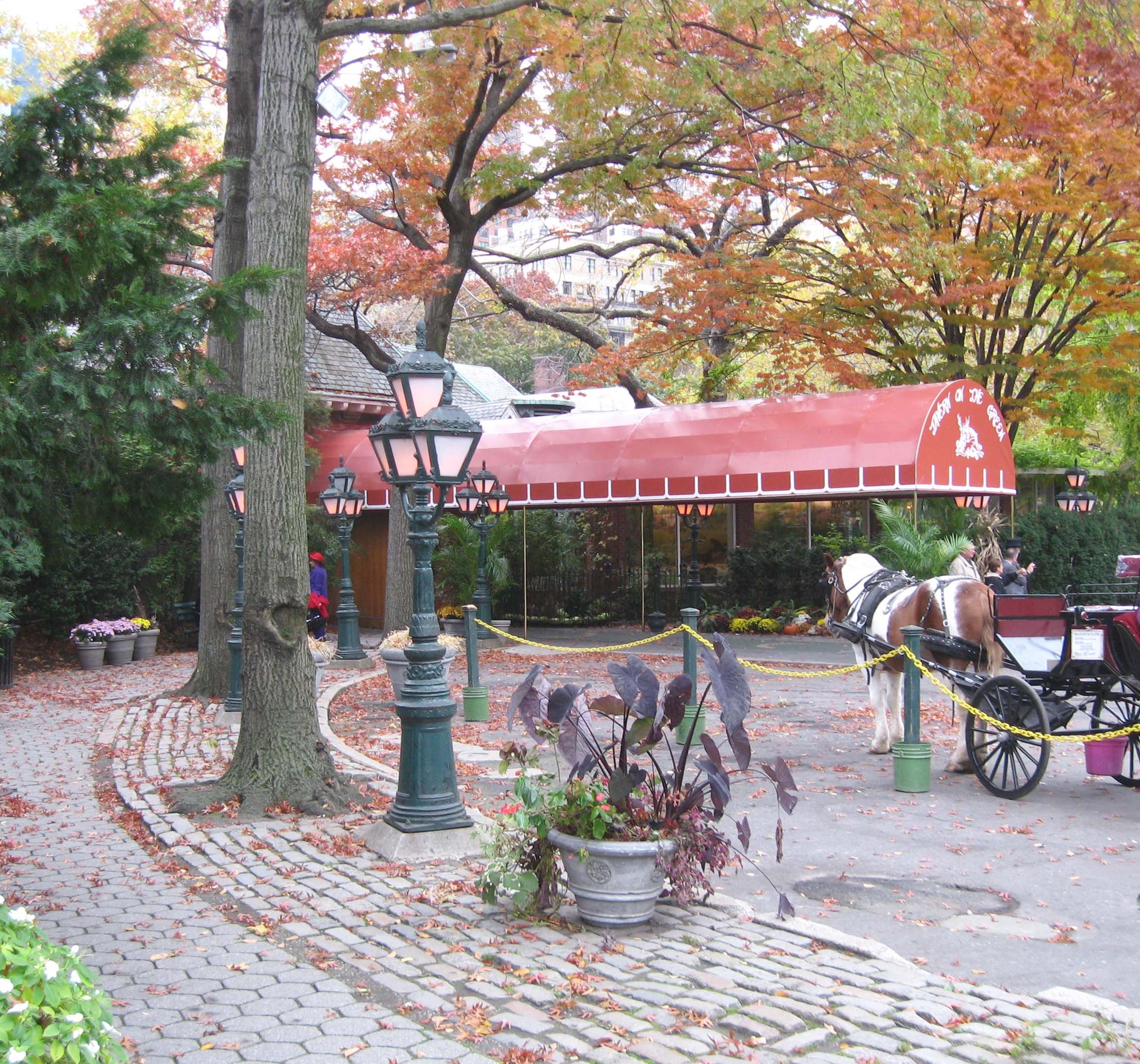
The main entrance to Tavern on the Green in November 2008

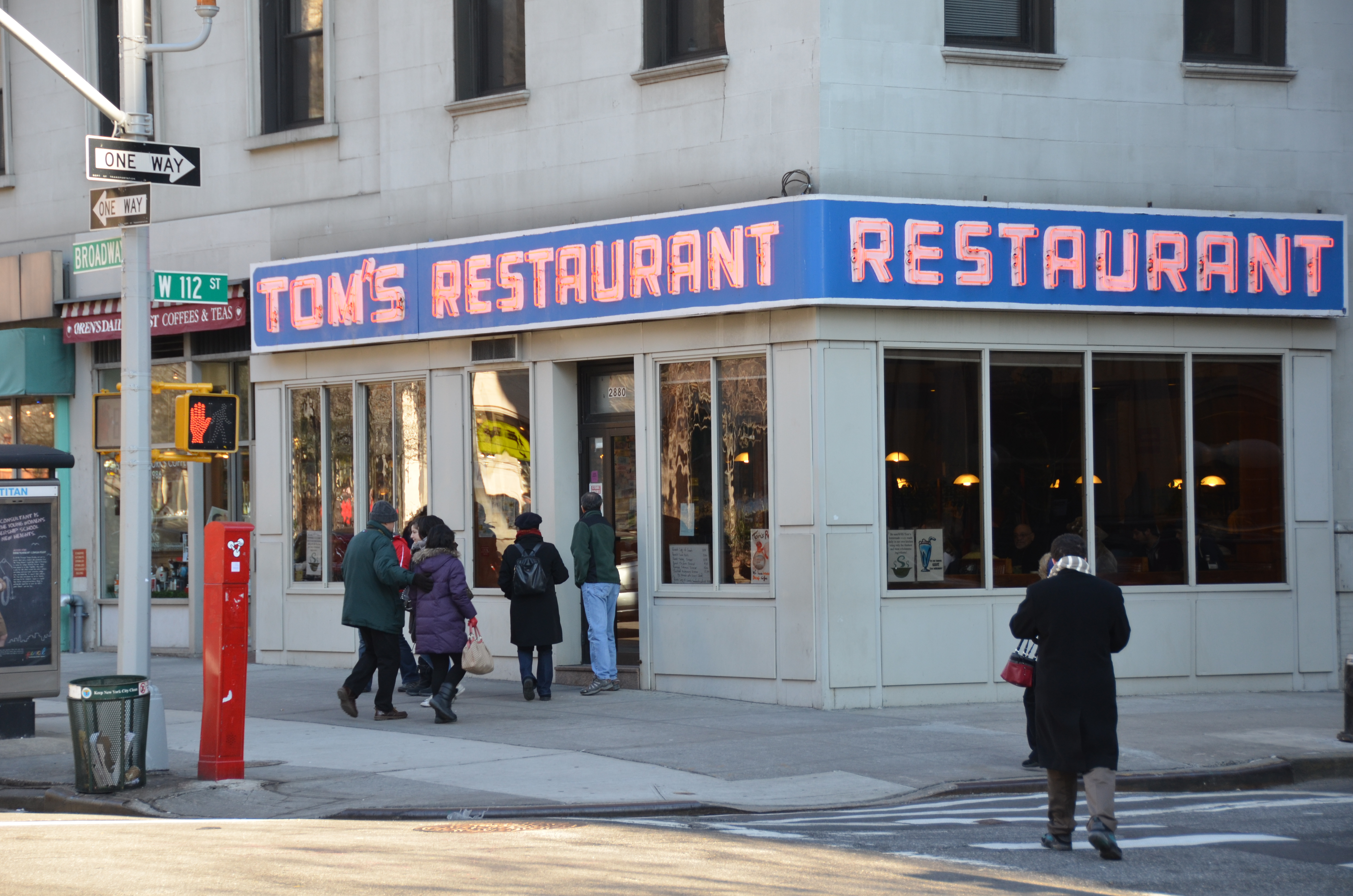
Tom's Restaurant, featured often in the sitcom Seinfeld

- 7th Street Burger
- Aquavit
- Asiate
- Atera
- Atlantic Grill
- Baby Brasa
- Balthazar
- Barbetta
- Barbuto
- Barney Greengrass
- Le Bernardin
- Blue Hill
- Café Boulud
- Caravaggio
- Carbone
- Carlyle Restaurant
- Charles' Southern Style Kitchen
- Chef's Table at Brooklyn Fare
- China Grill
- Cipriani S.A.
- Clinton Street Baking Company & Restaurant
- Le Coucou
- Daniel
- Delmonico's
- Dirt Candy
- Dorrian's Red Hand Restaurant
- Eleven Madison Park
- Ellen's Stardust Diner
- L'Entrecôte
- El Quijote
- Ferrara Bakery and Cafe
- Frankie & Johnnie's Steakhouse
- Fraunces Tavern
- Gallagher's Steak House
- Gotham Bar and Grill
- Gramercy Tavern
- Gray's Papaya
- La Grenouille
- Guss' Pickles
- H&H Bagels
- The Halal Guys
- Hallo Berlin
- Hamburger America
- Handpulled Noodle
- Hop Kee
- IDT Megabite Cafe
- J.G. Melon
- Jean Georges
- Joe Allen
- Joe's Shanghai
- Julius
- Kappo Masa Restaurant
- Katz's Delicatessen
- Keens Steakhouse
- King's Carriage House
- Kossar's Bialys
- Los Tacos No. 1
- Lusardi's
- Magnolia Bakery
- Marea
- Masa
- Matsugen
- McSorley's Old Ale House
- Metropolitan Museum of Art Roof Garden
- Murray's Sturgeon Shop
- Numero 28
- One If By Land, Two If By Sea Restaurant
- Old Homestead Steakhouse
- The Original Soup Man
- Grand Central Oyster Bar & Restaurant
- P. J. Clarke's
- The Palm
- Papaya King
- Patsy's
- Le Pavillon
- Peanut Butter & Co.
- Per Se
- Pete's Tavern
- Pommes Frites
- Porter House New York
- Rainbow Room
- Rao's
- Ray's Candy Store
- Restaurant Aquavit
- Rolfe's Chop House
- Russian Tea Room
- Salumeria Biellese
- Salumeria Rosi Parmacotto
- Sardi's
- Sasabune
- Second Avenue Deli
- Serendipity 3
- Shopsins
- Shun Lee Palace
- Le Soleil
- Smith & Wollensky
- Sparks Steak House
- Strip House
- Sushi of Gari
- Sushi Nakazawa
- Sushi Seki
- Sushi Yasuda
- Sylvia's Restaurant of Harlem
- Taïm
- Tavern on the Green
- Tea and Sympathy
- Tom's Restaurant
- Tribeca Grill
- Umberto's Clam House
- Union Square Cafe
- Upland
- Veniero's
- Veselka
- The Water Club
- West Bank Cafe
- Wo Hop
- Yonah Shimmel's Knish Bakery

=== Pizzerias ===
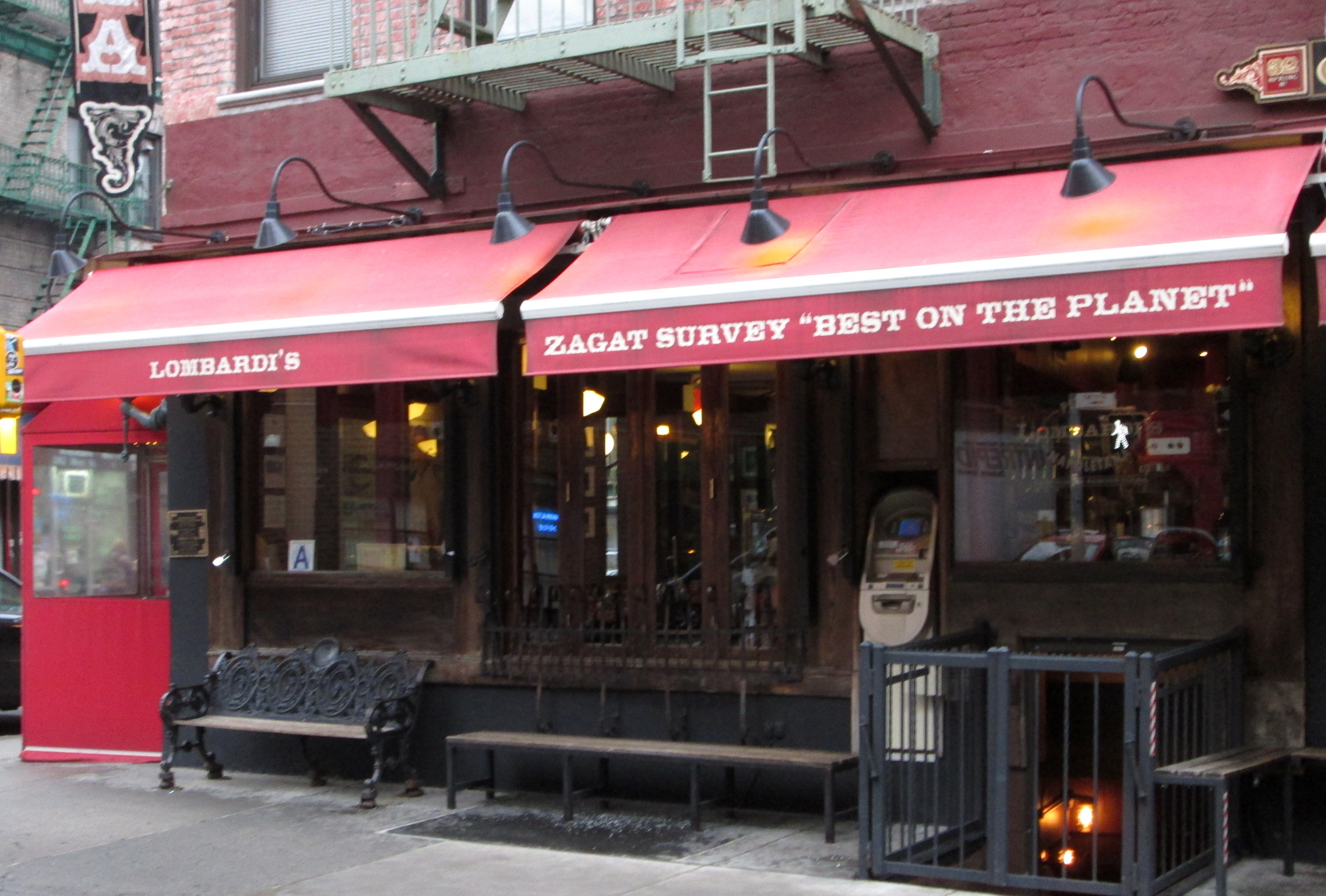
Lombardi's Pizza, at 32 Spring Street on the corner of Mott Street in the Nolita neighborhood in the borough of Manhattan, New York City

== Defunct restaurants ==
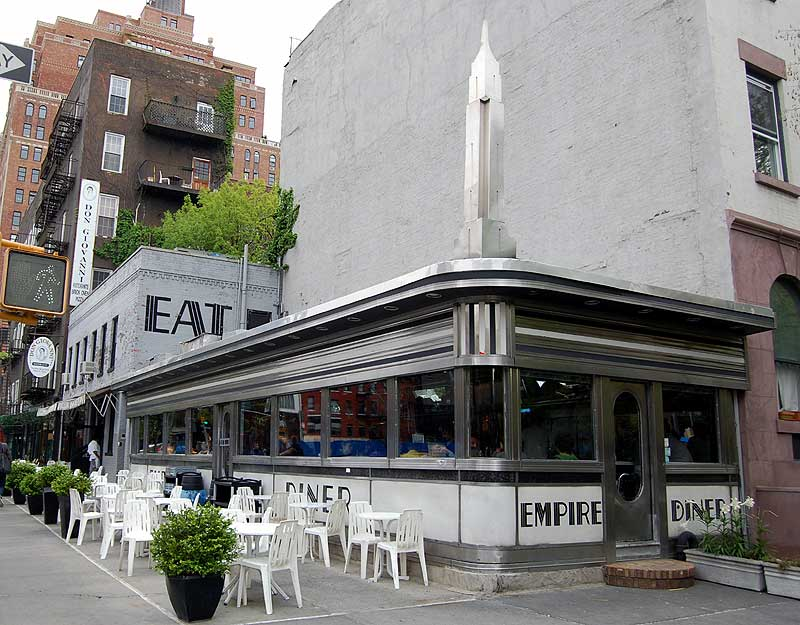
The Empire Diner

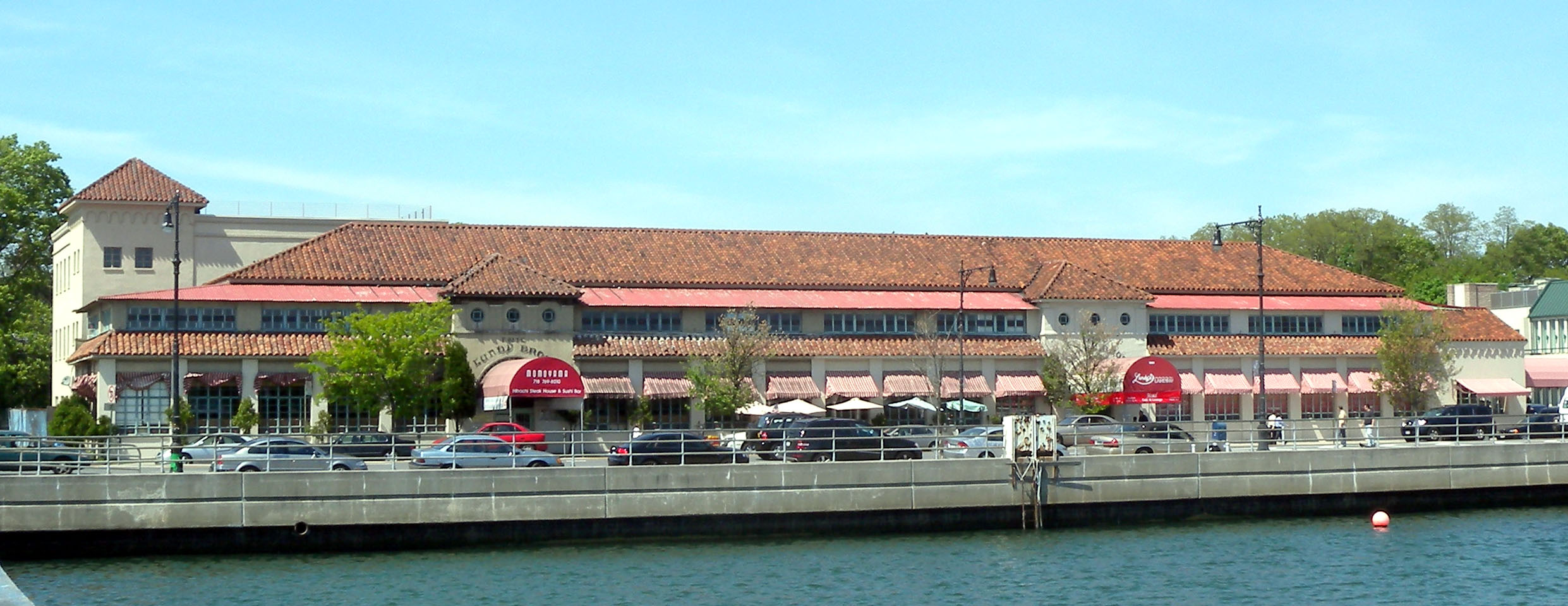
Lundy's Restaurant

- 21 Club
- Andanada
- Aquagrill
- Batard
- BiCE Ristorante
- Bouley
- Brasserie Julien
- Brasserie Les Halles
- Bridge Cafe
- Burger Heaven
- Cafe Chambord
- Café Nicholson
- Candle Cafe
- Carnegie Deli
- The Cattleman
- Chelsea Place
- Childs Restaurants
- Le Cirque
- Cloud Club
- The Colony
- Corton
- Costello's
- La Côte Basque
- Del Pezzo Restaurant
- Dubrow's Cafeteria
- Elaine's
- El Faro Restaurant
- Empire Diner
- Fashion Cafe
- The Florent
- The Four Seasons Restaurant
- Horn & Hardart
- Jekyll & Hyde Club
- Jimmy Ryan’s (jazz club)
- Jimmy Weston's (jazz club)
- Kiev Restaurant
- LaRue – former nightclub from 1928 to 1968 at 58th and Park Streets
- Lindy's
- Loft, Incorporated
- Longchamps
- Lüchow's
- Lundy's Restaurant
- Lutèce
- Manganaro's
- Mars 2112
- Mas
- Maxwell's Plum
- Mo Gridder's
- Moondance Diner
- Mori
- Munson Diner
- Neary's
- Old London Inc.
- Onyx Club
- Penny Cafeteria
- Ratner's
- Reuben's Restaurant
- Shanley's Restaurants
- The Spotted Pig
- Stage Deli
- Stock Exchange Luncheon Club – former members-only dining club, on the seventh floor of the New York Stock Exchange at 11 Wall Street in Manhattan
- Stork Club – former nightclub from 1929 to 1965
- Teany
- Toots Shor's Restaurant
- Wd~50
- Windows on the World
- ZZ's Clam Bar

== See also ==
- List of Michelin-starred restaurants in New York City
- Cuisine of New York City
- Lists of restaurants
- New York Restaurant Week
