= Soleil =

Soleil is the French word for the Sun.

Soleil may also refer to:

== Music ==
- Soleil (Françoise Hardy album), a 1970 album by Françoise Hardy
- Soleil (Jean-Pierre Ferland album), a 1971 album
- Soleil (Watanabe Misato album), a 2002 album by female Japanese pop artist Watanabe Misato
- "Soleil", a 1984 song by Dalida
- "Soleil", a 2026 song by French musician Gims

== Other uses ==
- Cure Soleil, alias of Amamiya Elena From Star Twinkle PreCure.
- SOLEIL, a synchrotron in France
- Soleil (Brisbane), a skyscraper in Brisbane, Australia
- Soleil (film), a 1997 French film by Roger Hanin
- Soleil (name), a surname and given name
- Soleil (singer) (born 1983), Argentine musical artist
- Soleil FC, a football club based in Cotonou, Benin
- Soleil Productions, a French comic book publisher
- Le Soleil, a list of newspapers
- The European title for the Sega Mega Drive game Crusader of Centy
- Le Soleil (restaurant), a Haitian restaurant in Manhattan, New York City
- Cité Soleil (Sun City), a commune in the Port-au-Prince metropolitan area in Haiti
- Mont Soleil, a mountain in the Canton of Bern, Switzerland
- Soleil, a Japanese video game developer; see Valhalla Game Studios
- Soleil Radio, a radio station in the Channel Islands

== See also ==
- Cirque du Soleil, an international circus organization based in Montreal, Canada
