= Defonte's =

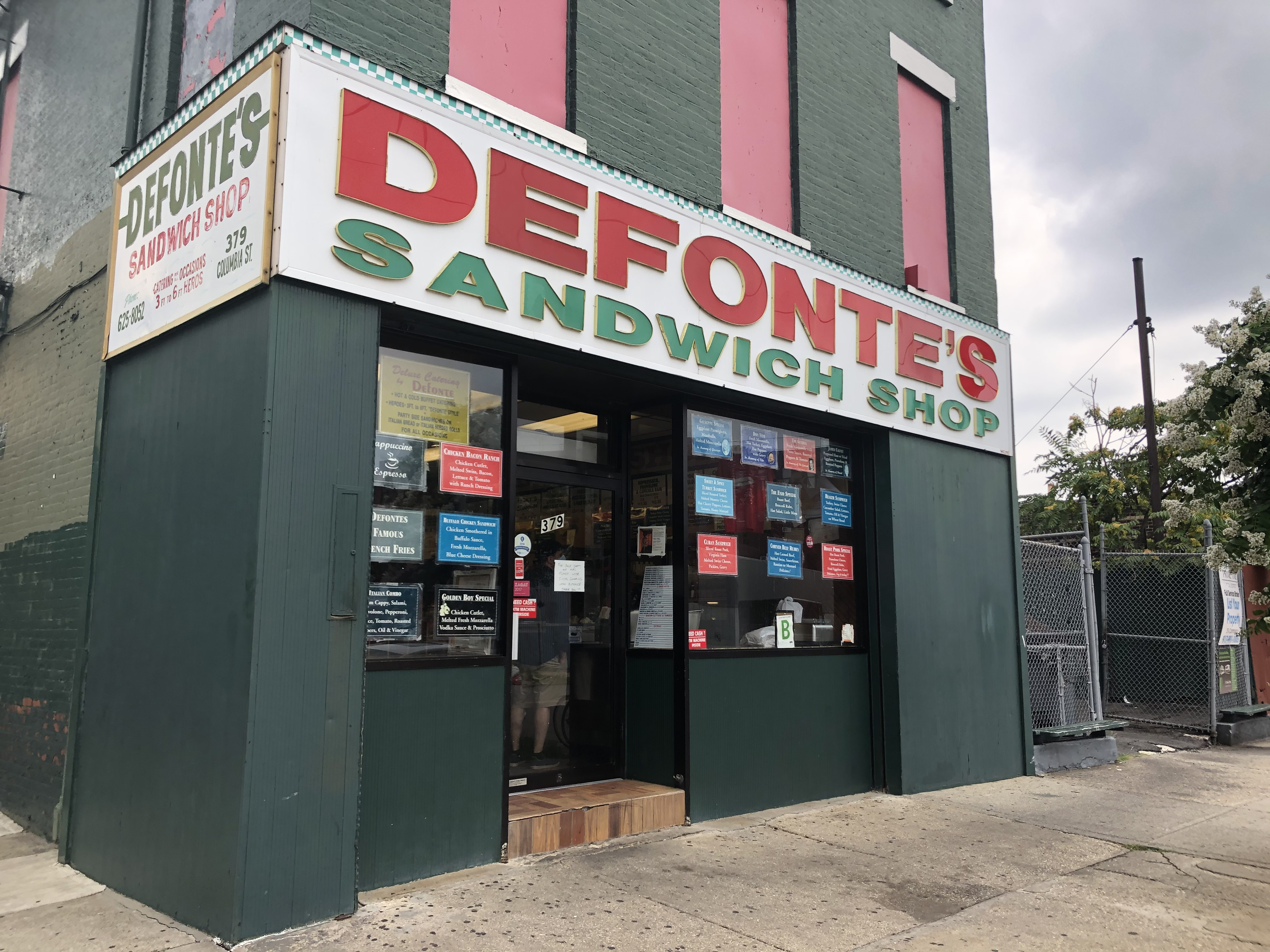
- Interactive map of Defonte's

Restaurant information
- Established: 1922
- Location: 379 Columbia Street, Brooklyn, New York, 11231, United States
- Coordinates: 40°40′44.35″N 74°0′19.64″W

Defonte's is a sandwich shop in Red Hook, Brooklyn, New York City. It is known for large Italian heroes with ham, provolone, salami, roast beef, mozzarella and fried eggplant. There is also a steak pizzaiola sandwich.

== History ==
The business began as a bodega like shop in 1922 by Nick Defonte. Before long, the longshoremen working in the area were asking for sandwiches. His grandson Nicky runs the restaurant now. He believes the first sandwich served was ham and cheese with lettuce, tomato and olive oil.

== In popular culture ==
The eatery was featured on Diners, Drive-Ins and Dives on February 20, 2012 in the Long Standing Legacies episode. They were mentioned on Season 1, Episode 9 of the CBS police procedural East New York.

== Locations ==
There was also a Gramercy location in Manhattan where offerings included prepared dinners, it closed in 2014. The original location is at 379 Columbia Street in Brooklyn.

== See also ==
- List of restaurants in New York City
- List of Italian restaurants
