= Ray's Pizza =

Several independent pizza restaurants in New York

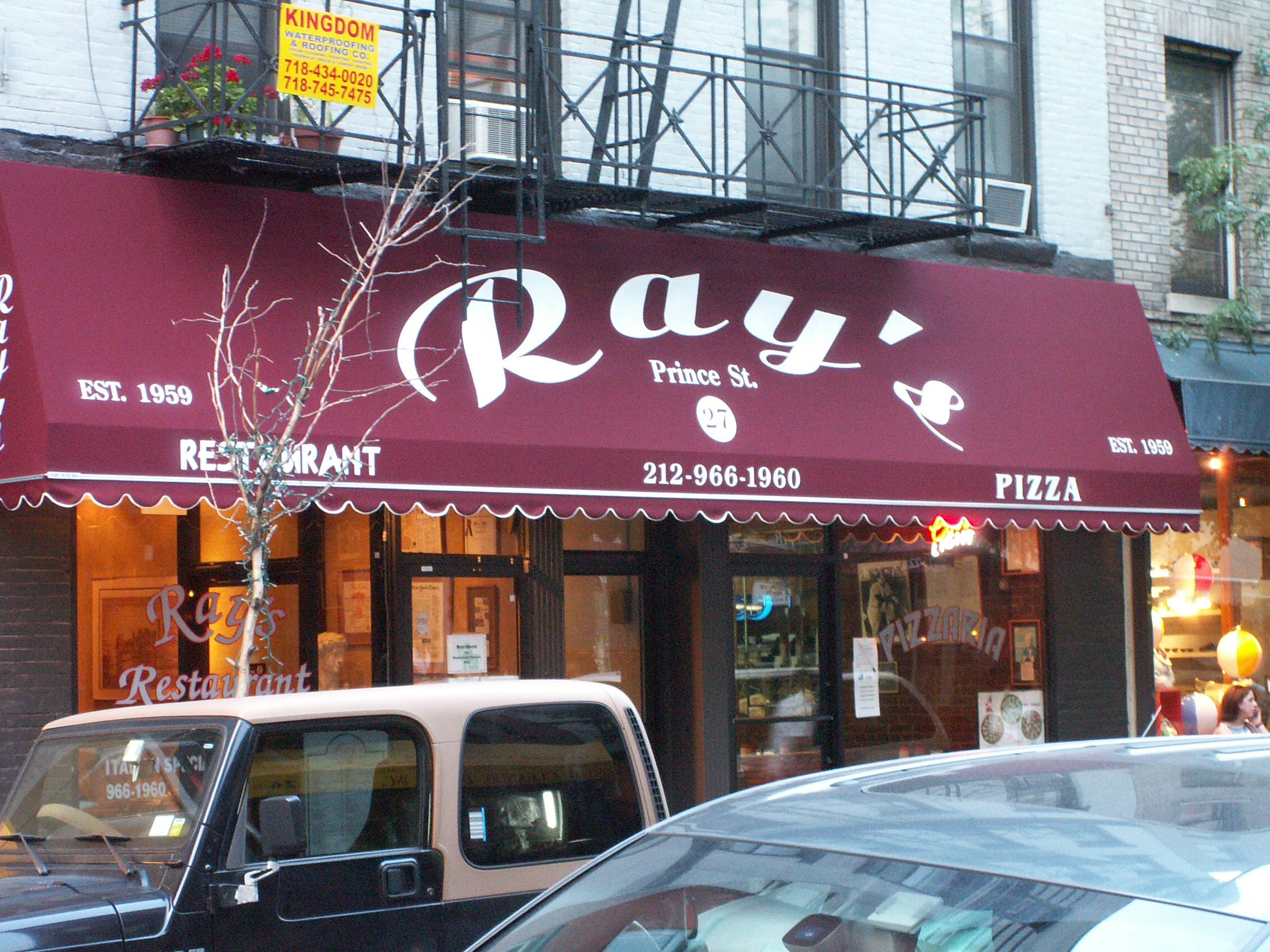
First Ray's Pizza, at 27 Prince Street on the northern edge of Little Italy, Manhattan

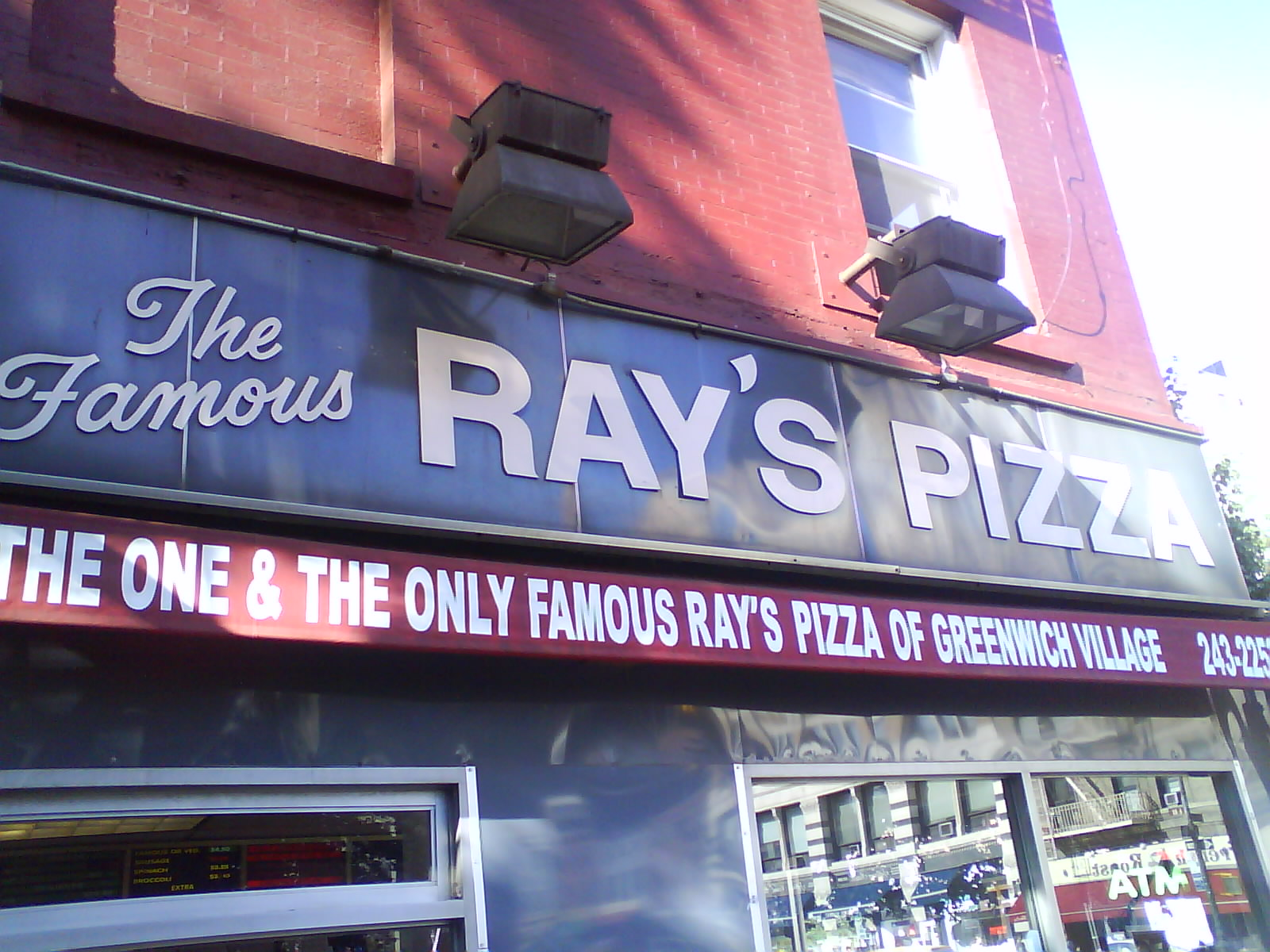
Famous Ray's Pizza, at Sixth Avenue and 11th Street in Greenwich Village, Manhattan

Ray's Pizza, and its many variations such as "Ray's Original Pizza", "Famous Ray's Pizza" and "World-Famous Original Ray's Pizza", are the names of dozens of pizzerias in the New York City area that are generally completely independent (a few have multiple locations) but may have similar menus, signs, and logos.

== History ==
Ralph Cuomo opened the first Ray's Pizza, at 27 Prince Street in Little Italy, in 1959, named after his nickname "Raffie". In the 1960s, he briefly owned a second Ray's Pizza, but sold it to Rosolino Mangano in 1964. Mangano kept the name and later claimed that his was the first. In 1973, Mario Di Rienzo named his new pizzeria Ray's Pizza (which is now closed), claiming it was based on the nickname for his family in Italy. Also that year, Joseph Bari purchased a pizzeria from Mangano and renamed it and several others as Ray Bari Pizza. By 1991, dozens of pizzerias in New York City had "Ray's" in their name, as well as those in other American states.

In 1981, Gary Espozito purchased a pizzeria from Mangano. After opening several more "Original Ray's" restaurants, he partnered with Cuomo and Mangano to combine independent "Ray's" restaurants into an official franchise chain. As of 2011 there were at least 49 restaurants by some variant of that name in the New York City telephone directory, including one named "Not Ray's Pizza".

The first Ray's Pizza closed its doors on Sunday, October 30, 2011, following a legal dispute over rent and a lease that followed its owner's death in 2008. Half of the space that once housed Ray's Pizza has been leased to a new company, Prince Street Pizza. Meanwhile, Famous Ray's Pizza on Sixth Avenue and 11th Street, which had served pizza since the 1970s, closed down in 2011, reopened under the name "Famous Roio's Pizza" in 2012, and closed again in 2013. A Chinese restaurant occupied the space; however, it shut down in 2023. As of 2024, a new pizzeria has been opened in that space, called Roma Pizza.

== See also ==
- New York-style pizza
- List of Italian restaurants
- List of pizza chains of the United States
- List of restaurants in New York City
