= Max and Mina's =

Coordinates: 40°43′37.91″N 73°49′20.62″W

- Interactive map of Max and Mina's

Restaurant information
- Established: 1997; 29 years ago
- Food type: Ice cream
- Location: 7126 Main Street, Flushing, New York, 11367, United States

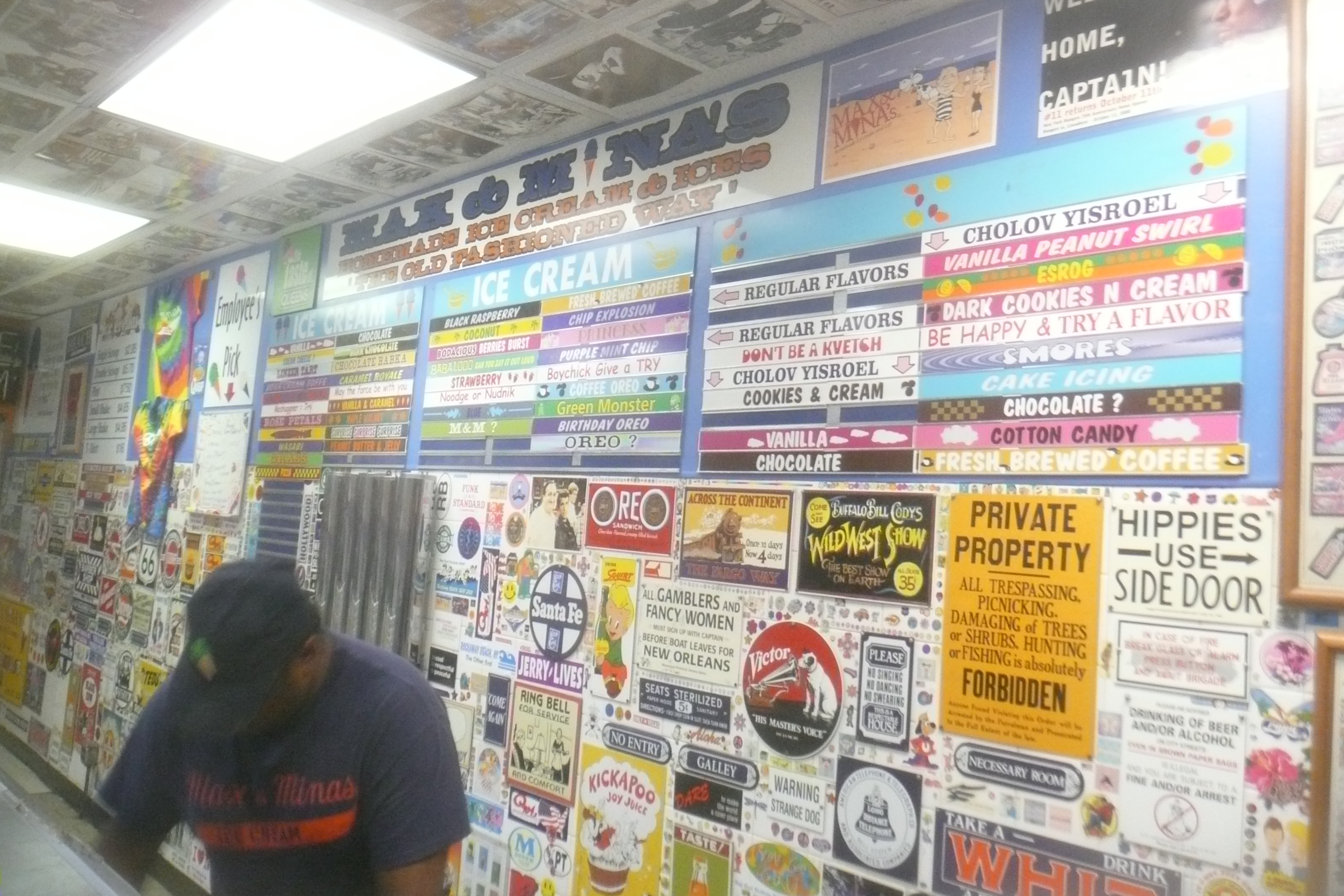
The inside of Max and Mina's, showing some of their many flavors

Max and Mina's is an ice cream store in New York City, United States, opened in 1997. Owned by brothers Bruce and Mark Becker, it is known for its ever-changing eccentric ice cream flavors, such as Cajun, Lox, Purple Mint Chip, beer, malt.

Max and Mina's was named number 1 of the top 10 unique ice cream parlors in America in Everybody Loves Ice Cream, the Whole Scoop on America's favorite treat by Shannos Jackson Arnold, Emmis Books, July 2004. The Travel Channel listed the shop as "one of America's most famous ice cream paradises." Some Manhattan restaurants offer Max & Mina's Ice Cream on their dessert menus. The store has been an answer on Hollywood Squares and in recent versions of Trivial Pursuit.

== See also ==
- List of restaurants in New York City
