= Old Homestead Steakhouse =

Coordinates: 40.741256°N 74.004863°W

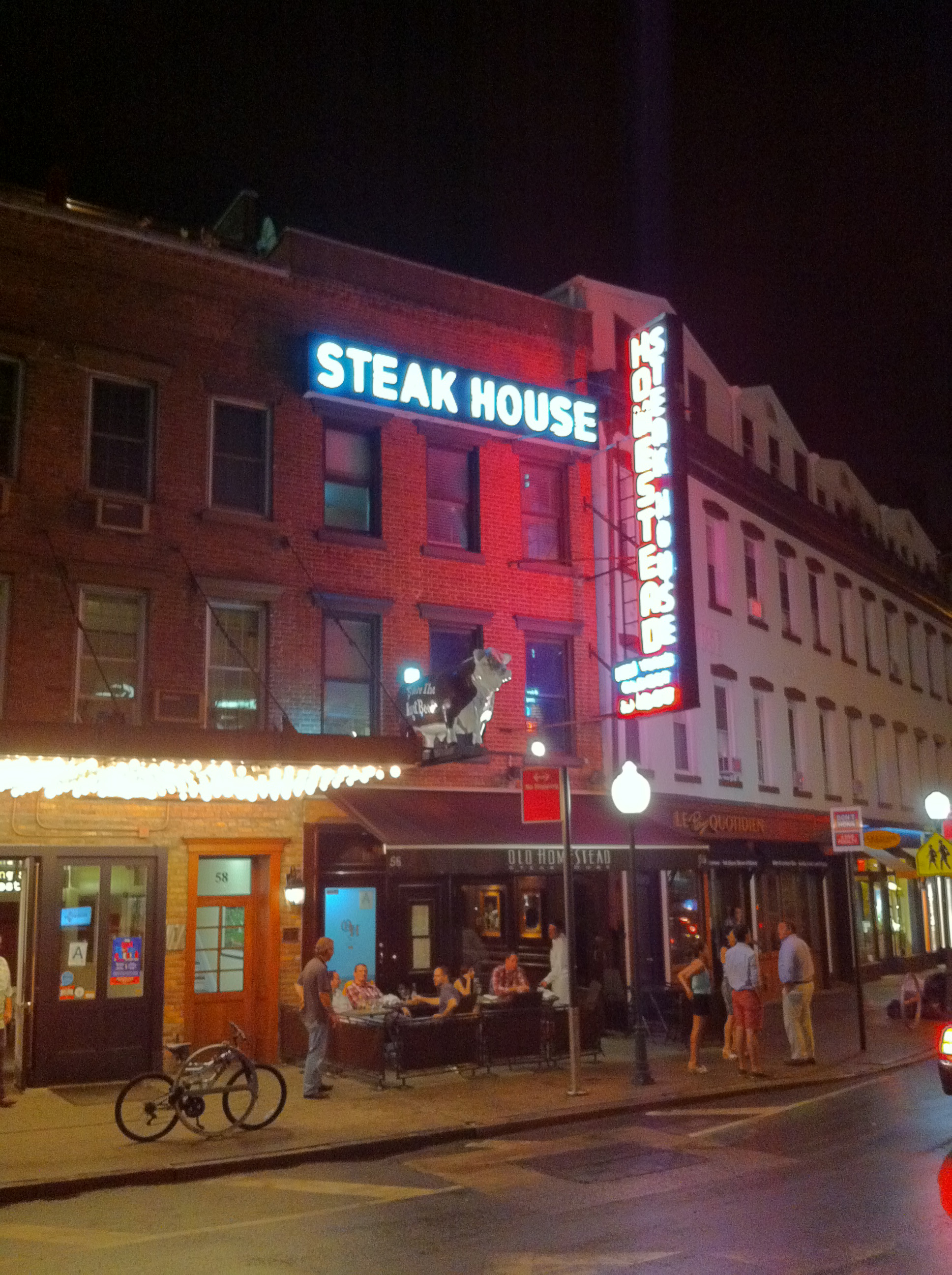
- Restaurant exterior in 2012
- Interactive map of Old Homestead Steakhouse

Restaurant information
- Established: 1868; 158 years ago
- Owners: Greg Sherry; Marc Sherry
- Food type: Steakhouse
- Location: 56 9th Ave, Manhattan, New York City, 10011, United States
- Website: Old Homestead Steakhouse

The Old Homestead Steakhouse is a steakhouse established in 1868 whose flagship location is in Manhattan, New York City. The restaurant is the oldest continuously operating steakhouse in the United States. Staff at the Old Homestead Steakhouse are represented by UNITE HERE Local 100.

== History ==
In 1868, a German family established the Old Homestead Steakhouse, then called Tidewater Trading Post, in Manhattan's Meatpacking District on West 14th and 9th Avenue. In the 1940s, longtime employee and former dishwasher, Harry Sherry, purchased the restaurant. Sherry later passed the legacy down to his family. The steakhouse is now owned and operated by his grandsons Greg and Marc Sherry.

In the mid-20th century, a Texan who enjoyed the restaurant told Harry Sherry that he would send him a cow. Two weeks later a statue of a cow was delivered and has since become a signature symbol of the Old Homestead.

In the 1990s, the restaurant was the first in the United States to introduce Wagyu beef from Japan. In order to be certified, Greg and Marc had to work with Japanese farmers to bring their facilities up to the health code standard in America.

Two additional locations were opened, with one in Atlantic City at the Borgata and the other in Las Vegas at Caesars Palace. The Atlantic City location was named the best restaurant in Atlantic City by Zagat's "2012 America's Top Restaurants". In 2023, it was announced the Caesars Palace location would be closing and would be replaced by a Bobby Flay restaurant.

The Old Homestead is the oldest continuously operating steakhouse in the United States and is senior to Keens (founded 1885) and Peter Luger Steak House (founded 1887).

== Ratings ==
In 1994, Ruth Reichl of The New York Times stated that "for sheer quantity, nothing can beat the Homestead". Reichl described the porterhouse for two as "thicker than the Manhattan phone book and twice as heavy".

== In popular culture ==
The steakhouse has made appearances in multiple television shows, including a 1995 episode of Seinfeld and a 2004 episode of the HBO series The Sopranos.

== See also ==
- List of restaurants in New York City
- List of steakhouses
