= Keens Steakhouse =

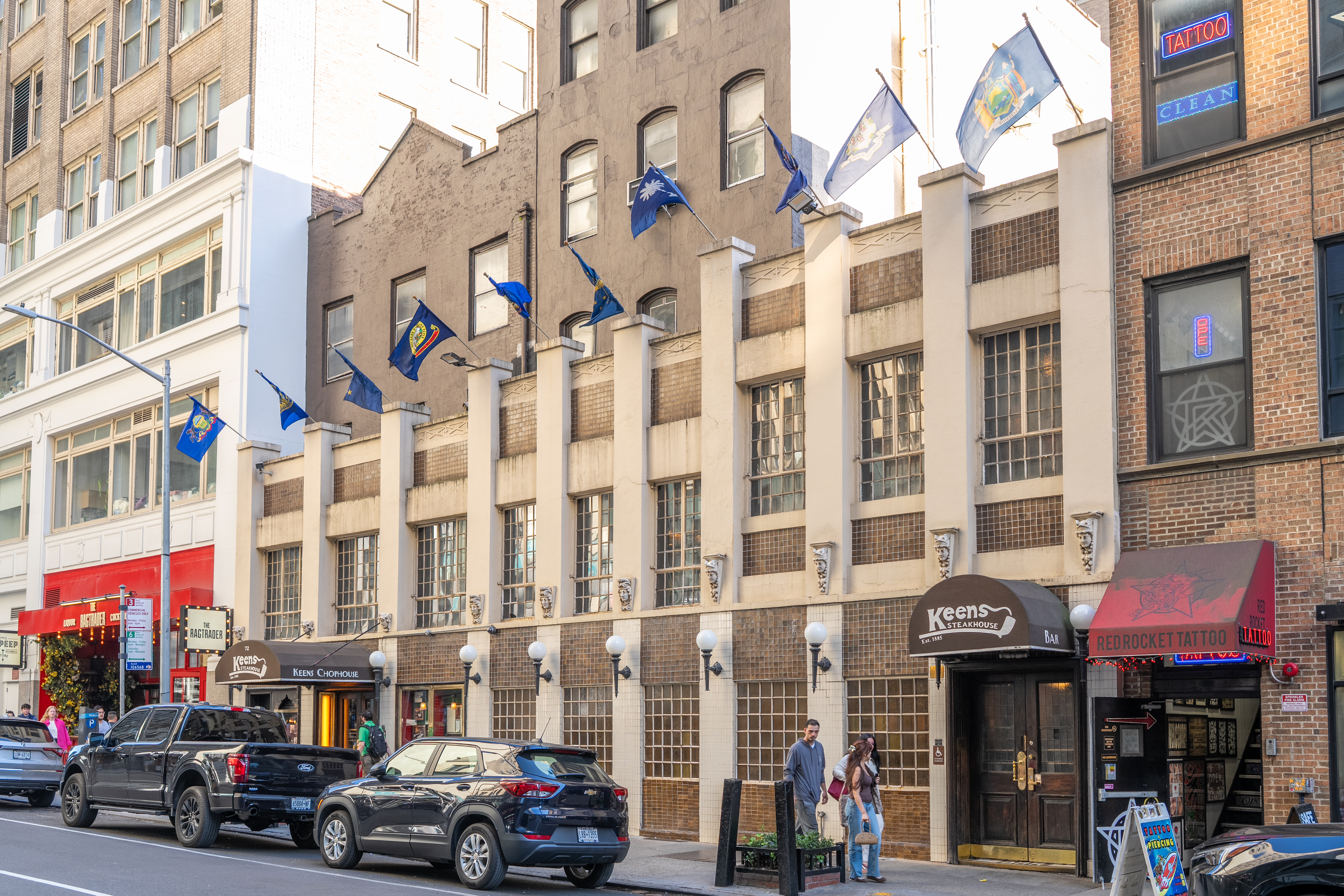
- Front entrance (2025)
- Interactive map of Keens Steakhouse

Restaurant information
- Established: 1885 (approx)
- Location: 72 West 36th Street (between Fifth Avenue and Sixth Avenue), in the Garment District in Manhattan, New York City, New York, 10018, United States
- Coordinates: 40.750854°N 73.986537°W

Patrons in 1910

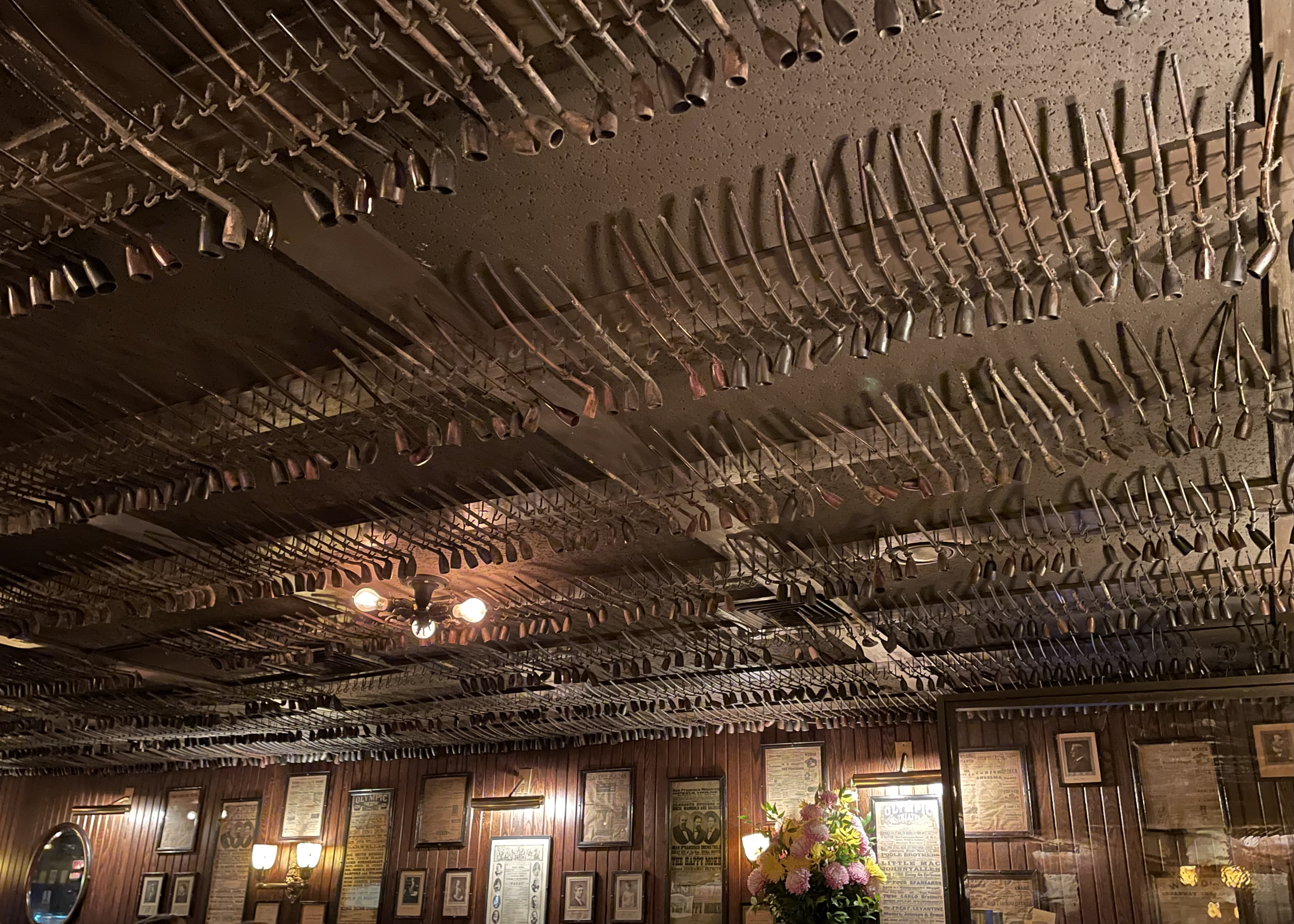
Clay pipes on display in the main dining room

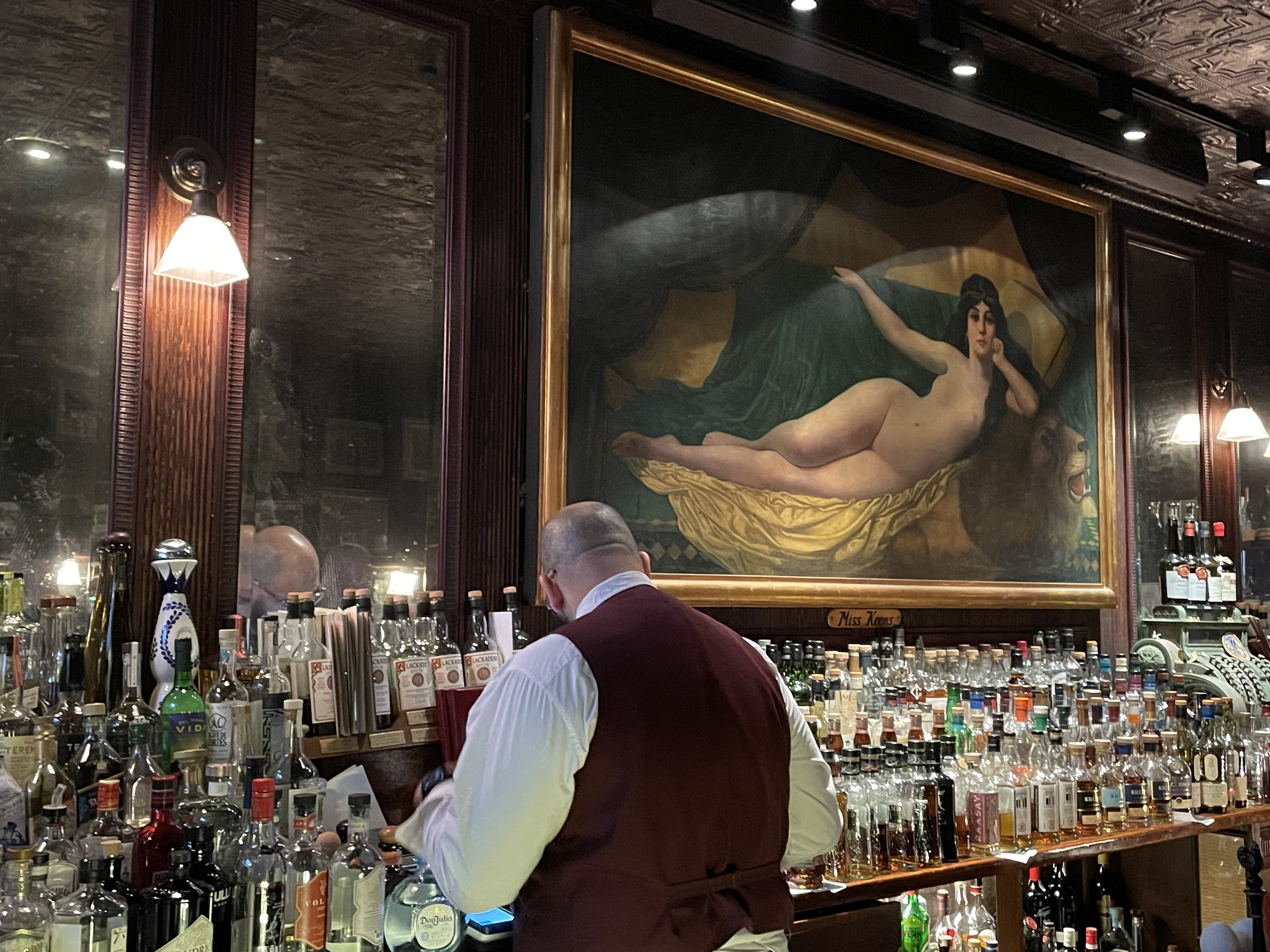
Portrait of Miss Keens in the main bar

Keens Steakhouse (formerly Keen's English Chop House) is a steakhouse restaurant located at 72 West 36th Street (between Fifth Avenue and Sixth Avenue) in the Garment District in Manhattan, New York City. The restaurant houses more than 50,000 clay smoking pipes, making it one of the largest collections in the world.

== History ==
The restaurant was founded in 1885 by Albert Keen in Herald Square, what was then the Herald Square Theater District. During his tenure, it served as an early eating spot for The Lambs. It is also the only surviving establishment of this former district.

Keens is the second-oldest steakhouse in New York City after the Old Homestead Steakhouse which was founded in 1868.

Only men were allowed entry up until 1905, when after being declined entry, the actress Lillie Langtry, sued them in court and won. One of the upstairs dining rooms is named in her honor.

In 1928, Keens was purchased by restauranteur and real estate developer Herman Zuch. In 1935, Keens sold its one millionth mutton chop, which to this day is still its signature dish.

After Herman Zuch's death in 1971, his family operated it for a time. His son David Zuch closed it in 1977 after failing to find a buyer. It was eventually purchased by radiation oncologist George Schwarz (1931–2016) and his wife, the artist Kiki Kogelnik. At the time, the couple already owned a number of other restaurants in the city, including Elephant and Castle, One Fifth and NoHo Star. With Kogelnik overseeing the design they ended up spending $1.4 million and three years restoring it before it reopened in 1981.

In November 2024, it was sold to Texas billionaire Tilman Fertitta for $30 million.

== Description ==
In 1954, Keen's was described as a "historic and unusual inn type restaurant, featuring English mutton chops steak and roast specialties; seats 350 in several dining rooms, with old English decor. Home of the Pipe Club; bar; no entertainment. Open lunch and dinner daily, except Sunday. Moderately expensive."

The wood-paneled walls of the main dining room, the bar and various dining rooms are home to approximately 500 artifacts collected over the history of the restaurant. Such artifacts are said to include the theatrical program Abraham Lincoln was holding at the time he was shot.

Patrons were given the opportunity to store fragile clay pipes at the restaurant so as to not risk breakage during transportation. The membership roster of the Pipe Club contained over 90,000 names, with many of the pipes hanging from the ceiling of the main dining room. Today some of the more well-known patrons' pipes are on display including:

- Theodore Roosevelt
- Babe Ruth
- Dr. Ruth Westheimer (Dr. Ruth) - honorary
- Stephen King - honorary
- Liza Minnelli - honorary
- Dr. Renee Richards - honorary
- John Barrymore
- David Belasco
- "Buffalo Bill" Cody
- George M. Cohan
- Albert Einstein
- General Douglas MacArthur
- Grace Moore
- J.P. Morgan
- Will Rogers
- Billy Rose
- Adlai Stevenson
- Stanford White

In 2013, Zagat gave it a food rating of 26, and rated it the #2 restaurant in the Garment District, and the 7th-best steakhouse in New York City.

== See also ==
- List of James Beard America's Classics
- List of the oldest restaurants in the United States
- List of restaurants in New York City
- List of steakhouses
