= Atlantic Grill =

- Interactive map of Atlantic Grill

Restaurant information
- Established: 1998; 28 years ago
- Owner: Monte Carlo Hospitality Group.
- Food type: Seafood
- Location: 50 West 65th Street, New York City, New York, 10023, USA
- Coordinates: 40°46′21″N 73°58′52″W
- Seating capacity: 220
- Website: www.atlanticgrill.com

Atlantic Grill is a seafood restaurant located at 50 West 65th street of Manhattan, New York City.

The 220-seat restaurant opened in 1998. It specializes in fish dishes, and is noted for its by-the-glass wine list.

The restaurant's wood and chrome bar is lined with photographs of the French Riviera by Jacques-Henri Lartigue. The main dining room has brown velour Hollywood booths and ecru chairs.

The restaurant was originally owned by B.R. Guest. In late 2021, Monte Carlo Hospitality Group, became the new management of the restaurant.

In 2013, Zagat gave it a rating of 23 for food.

== See also ==
- List of restaurants in New York City
- List of seafood restaurants
