= Burger Heaven =

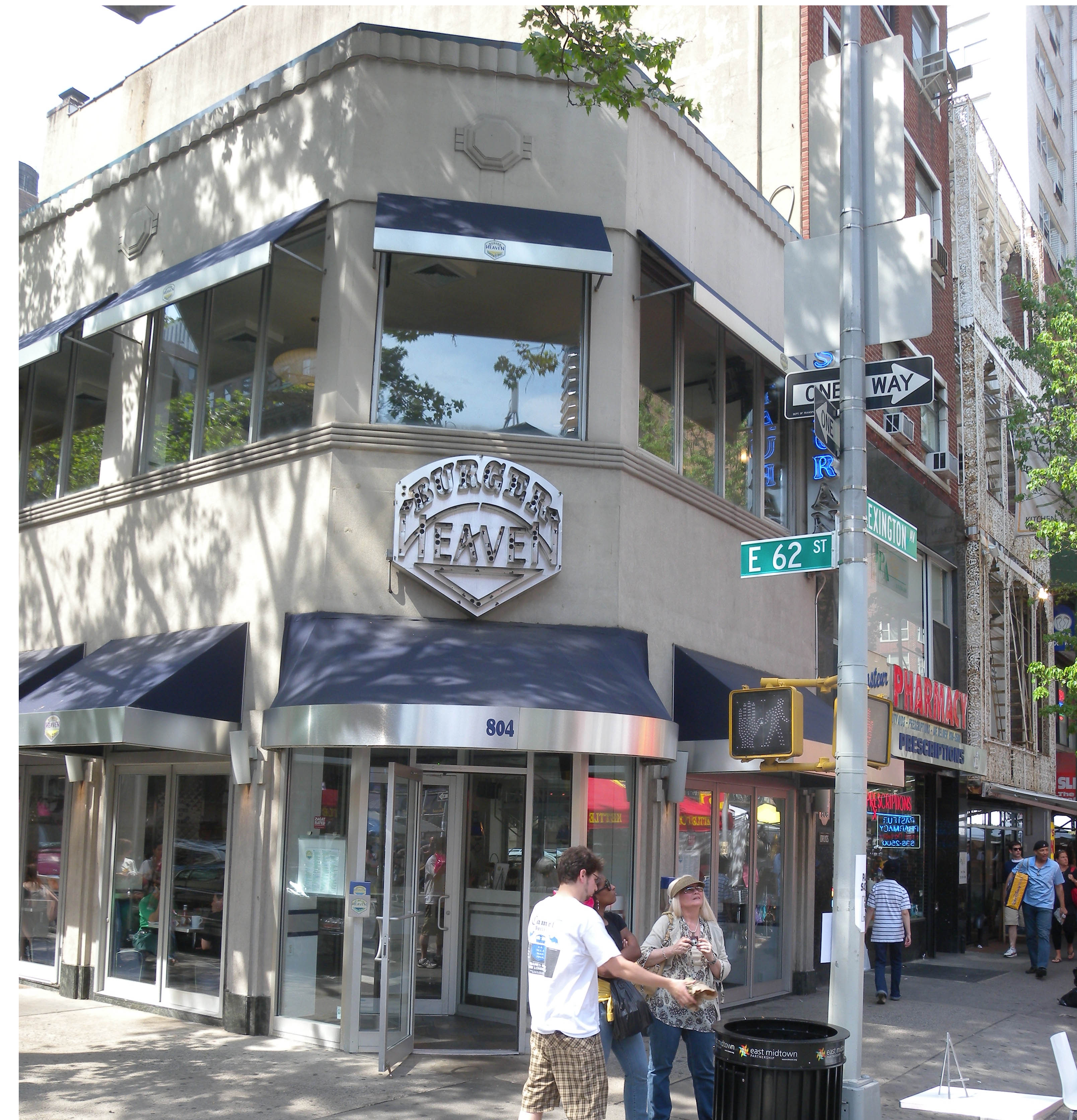

- Location in New York City

Restaurant information
- Established: 1943
- Closed: February 28, 2020
- Food type: Burger restaurant
- Rating: 17 (Zagats)
- Location: New York City, New York County, New York, United States
- Coordinates: 40.75747°N 73.97653°W
- Website: https://www.burgerheaven.com/

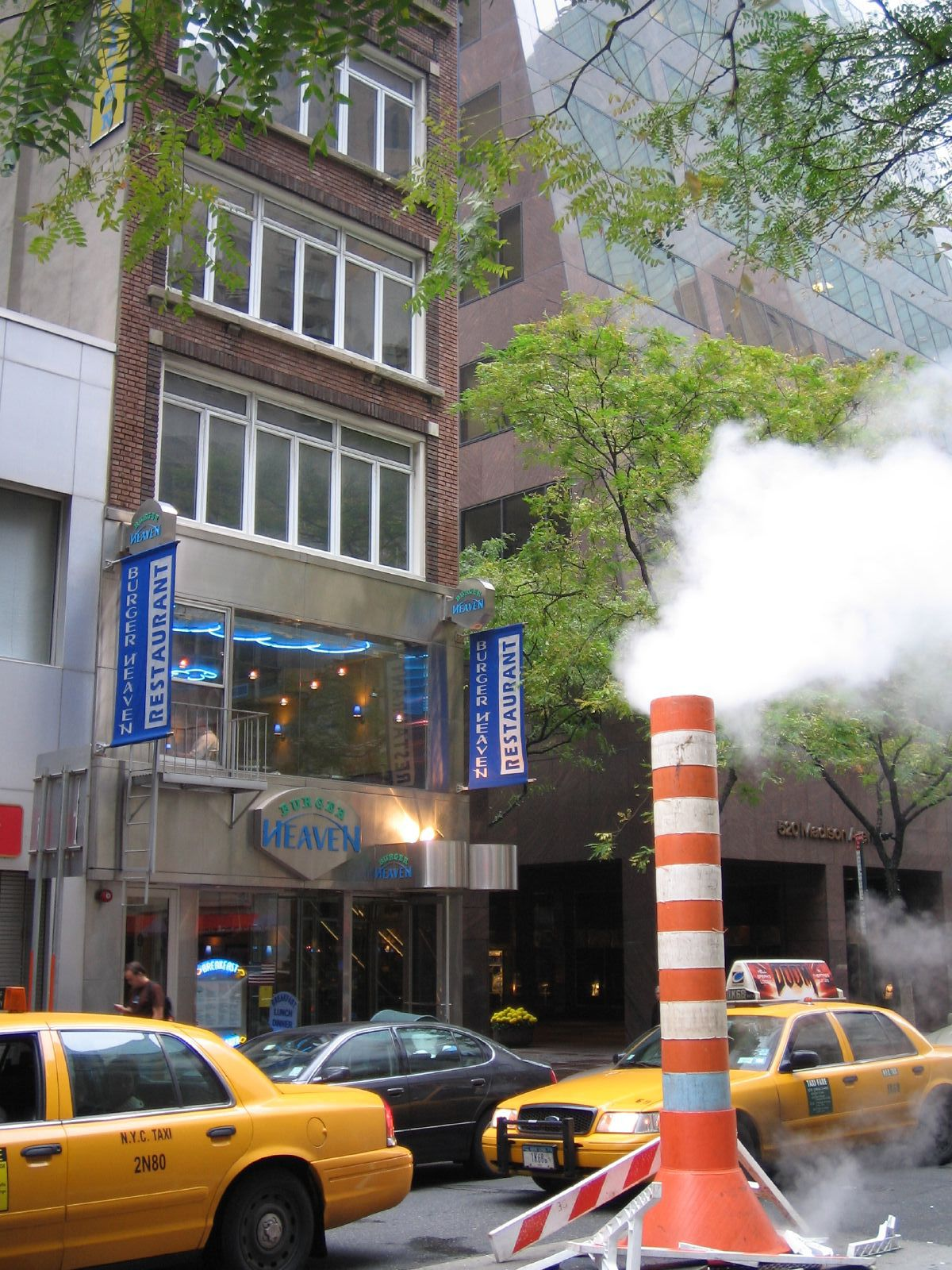
Burger Heaven

Burger Heaven was a family owned diner-style burger restaurant in New York City, established in 1943. It closed its final location in February 2020 citing the increase in "delivery culture".

== History ==
The chain started off as Beefburger on West 57th Street in 1943, but changed to Burger Heaven in 1974 due to trademark issues. For its 60th anniversary in 2003, the chain served 60-cent food, drink and dessert specials. In addition to burgers, tuna salad was a popular menu item. The family tradition continued with the second generation of Cyprus family members.

In 2009 the chain operated six locations in Midtown Manhattan and the Upper East Side, though by May 2012 the number of locations had been reduced to 3.

Menu offerings at Burger Heaven included pizza burgers, chili burgers, veggie burgers, "classic beef burgers" and turkey burgers as well as salads, hot and cold sandwiches such as grilled cheese, tuna melts, triple-deckers, and chicken salad. The burgers were served on kaiser buns.

In 2013, Zagat gave it a food rating of 17.

Burger Heaven closed its final location on the Upper East Side on February 28, 2020, citing its inability to adapt to the growing popularity of food delivery in New York City.

== See also ==
- Papaya King
- Gray's Papaya
- List of hamburger restaurants
- Patsy's Pizza
