= Baby Brasa =

Chain of bars based in New York City

Coordinates: 40.735966°N 74.001245°W

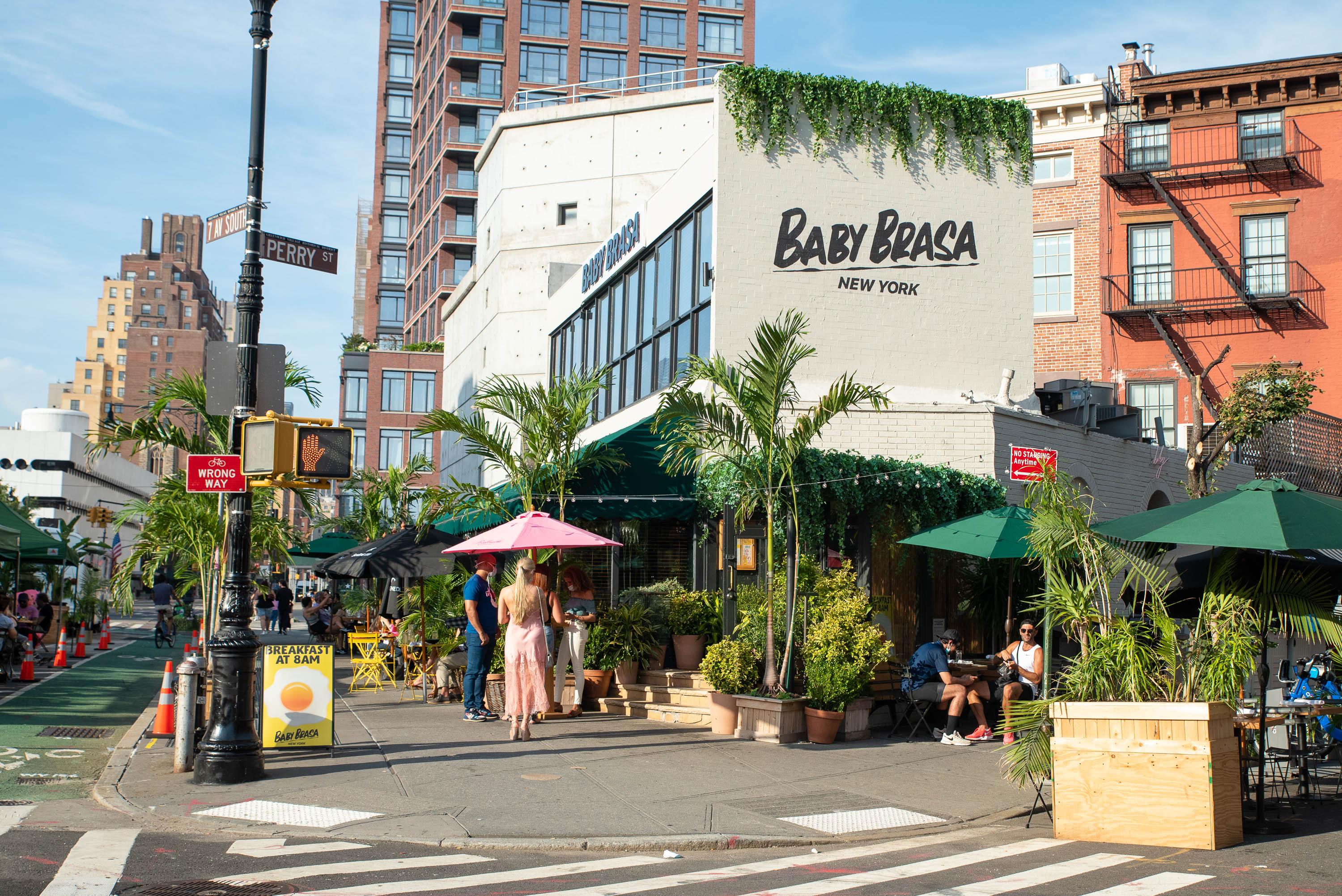
Baby Brasa's main location in the West Village, NYC

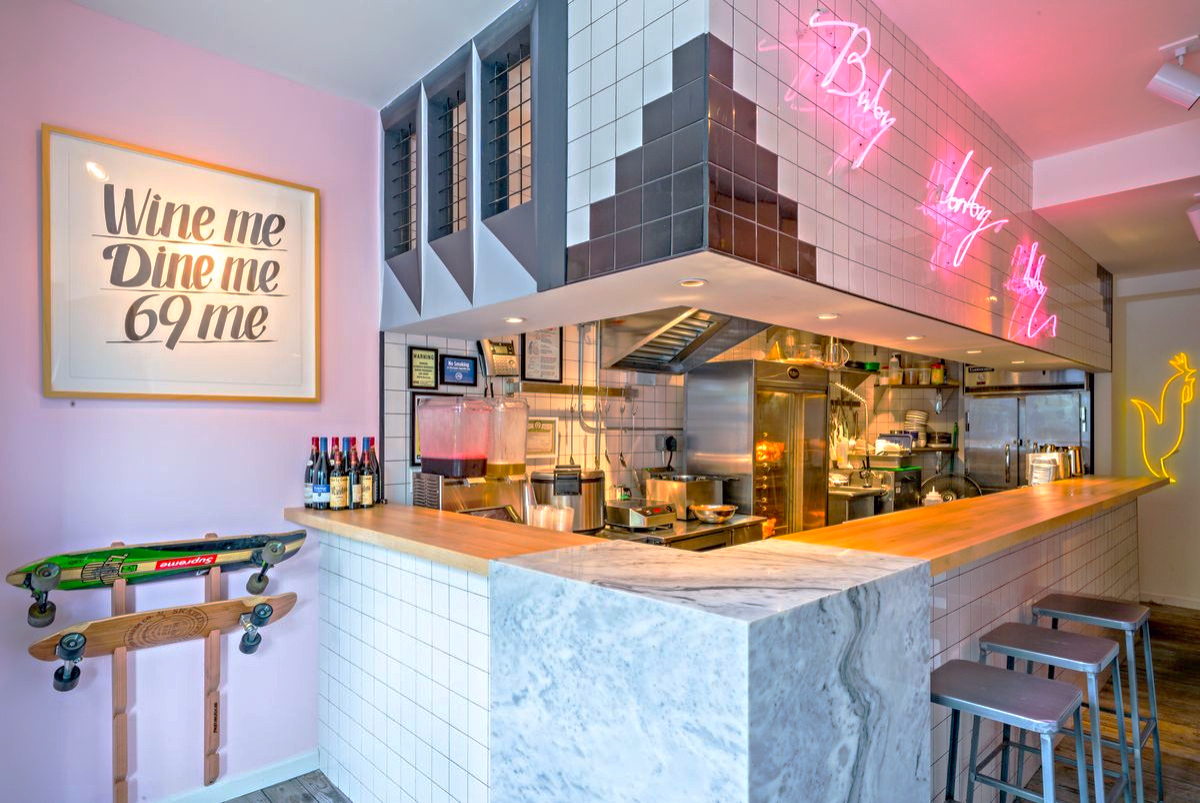
Baby Brasa's first location on the Lower East Side, NYC

Baby Brasa is an organic Peruvian group of restobars and catering service based in New York City, founded in 2016 by restaurateur, television personality and singer Franco Noriega. Baby Brasa has been owned by Milan Kelez, who also served as entertainment director and led the front of the house at Baby Brasa.

The two-story flagship location in the West Village serves contemporary Peruvian cuisine, fusion dishes, and cocktails and as of 2017 also hosted weekly live music performances. The company's first location opened as a small eatery on the Lower East Side, later expanding to the West Village. The West Village location closed in September 2024.
