= Soleil (name) =

Soleil may be either a surname or given name.

== Given name ==
- Soleil Moon Frye (born 1976), an American actress and director
- Soleil Sorge (born 1994), Italian and American model, television presenter, television personality and showgirl

== Surname ==
- Jean-Baptiste Soleil (1798-1878), French optician and engineer

== Fictional characters ==
- Cure Soleil, alias of Elena Amamiya in the anime series Star Twinkle PreCure
