= Rolfe's Chop House =

- Interactive map of Rolfe's Chop House

Restaurant information
- Established: 1848
- Location: 90 Fulton Street, New York, New York, 10038, United States
- Coordinates: 40.709135°N 74.006034°W

Rolfe's Chop House was a Manhattan eating establishment located in the Financial District at 90 Fulton Street, established in 1848. Rolfe's Chop House was a memorable piece of the history of New York City.

Earlier, the eatery was located in the Drake Building, 42 John Street. Thomas C. Innd (died October 13, 1914), a member of the Irish Historical Society and a New York City native, was proprietor at the John Street location.

In February 1924 the store and basement of the present Fulton Street edifice were sold to Mary Drake and her son; following extensive improvements, the restaurant was opened as Rolfe's Chop House.

Melville "Ernest" Fox (Feb 13, 1898 - Oct 1981) was proprietor in the mid-1930s until the restaurant's closure in 1967–68. During his tenure he was known for the “Ernest Special Salads” (“Made to order at the table”), which allowed Fox to foster relationships with the restaurant's noted clientele.

Among the beverages served by the restaurant in the mid-1930s was Sandy MacDonald scotch whiskey. The New York City Guide, published by the Works Progress Administration in 1939, notes that lunch at Rolfe's Chop House cost 35 cents and dinner sold for 75 cents. A menu from around 1941 shows dinner from 60 to 85 cents, cocktails, long drinks and liquors from 30 to 75 cents.
