= Le Soleil (restaurant) =

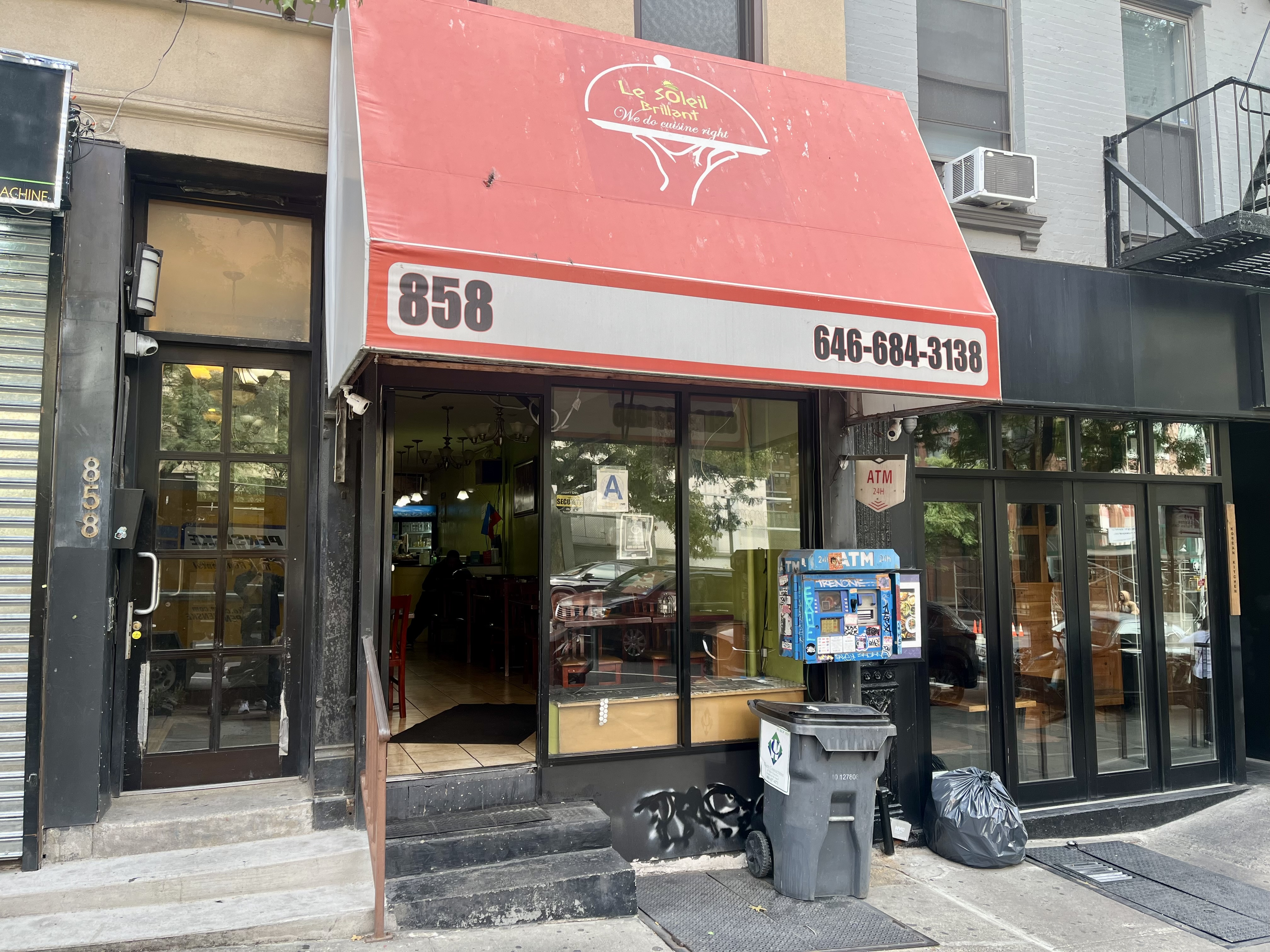
- The restaurant's exterior in 2024
- Interactive map of Le Soleil

Restaurant information
- Established: 1973
- Owner: Rolande Bisserth
- Food type: Haitian
- Location: 858 Tenth Avenue (bet. West 56th Street and West 57th Street), New York City, New York, 10019
- Coordinates: 40.768559°N 73.988554°W
- Website: lesoleilhaitianrestaurant.com

Le Soleil is a Haitian restaurant located at 858 Tenth Avenue (between West 56th Street and West 57th Street) in the Hell's Kitchen neighborhood of Manhattan, New York City.

== History ==
Le Soleil ("The Sun") was founded in 1973 by Rolande Bisserth, originally on 10th Avenue between 57 - 58th Streets in an area called Bois Verna, named after a neighborhood in Port-au-Prince known for its ancient latticed houses, where New York's version once boasted bookstores, churches, cafés, and bodegas called petit magasins.

Its decor entails colorful primitive-style tropical landscapes decorated on peach-colored walls above brown wainscoting.

== Rating ==
It is two-star rated by Eater. It was rated among the "Best Haitian restaurants in NYC" by Time Out magazine. In 2017 Foursquare ranked the restaurant 12th for "Best Caribbean Restaurants in New York City". It was rated by Thrillist, as the best BYOB for the "10 Most Essential Restaurants in Lincoln Center".

== See also ==
- List of restaurants in New York City
