= Joe's Shanghai =

Coordinates: 40°45′42.72″N 73°49′49.35″W

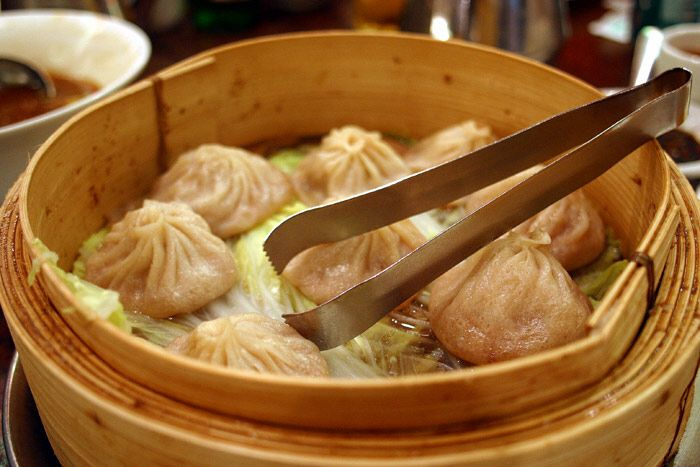
- Xiaolongbao from Joe's Shanghai
- Interactive map of Joe's Shanghai

Restaurant information
- Established: 1995
- Owner: Joe Si
- Previous owner: Barbara Matsumura
- Head chef: Joe Si
- Food type: Shanghai cuisine
- Website: www.joeshanghairestaurants.com

Joe's Shanghai (simplified Chinese: 鹿鸣春; traditional Chinese: 鹿鳴春; pinyin: Lù Míng Chūn) is a chain of seven Shanghainese restaurants in the United States and Japan. The original location was opened by restaurateur Mei Ping "Barbara" Matsumura and chef Kiu Sang "Joe" Si in 1995 in Flushing, Queens, followed by branches in Manhattan Chinatown and Midtown Manhattan. There are four locations in Japan, two in Tokyo, one in Osaka and one in Sendai. Ms. Matsumura has opened over a dozen restaurants in the New York City area, including the popular Haru sushi chain, while Chef Si also opened Joe's Ginger one block from the Manhattan Chinatown location of Joe's Shanghai, building on the original concept but incorporating the influence of other Chinese cuisines, most notably from Hong Kong.

== Xiaolongbao ==
The most famous dish at Joe's Shanghai is the pork or crab meat xiaolongbao, a type of small Chinese steam bun, in which the soup is encased inside the dumpling. This is achieved by chilling a highly gelatinous soup and wrapping it in the dough while solid. When the buns are later steamed, the solids melt back into liquid soup within the outer bun casing.

== Reviews and media ==
In 1996, Ruth Reichl of the New York Times gave Joe's Shanghai two stars out of four.

Currently, Zagat gives it a food rating of 4.2 out of 5.

In a friendly bet between New York City Mayor Michael Bloomberg and Boston Mayor Thomas Menino over the outcome of the 2003 American League Championship between the Boston Red Sox and New York Yankees, Mayor Bloomberg wagered one of his favorite foods from each borough of New York City. For the borough of Manhattan, he chose two dozen soup dumplings from Joe's Shanghai.

== See also ==
- List of Chinese restaurants
