= Veniero's =

Italian bakery

Coordinates: 40°43′45.8″N 73°59′04.3″W

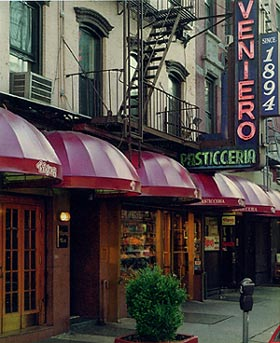
- Veniero's sign and front entrance
- Interactive map of Veniero's

Restaurant information
- Established: 1894; 132 years ago
- Owner: The Veniero family
- Food type: Bakery, Dessert, Italian
- Location: 342 East 11th Street (between First Avenue and Second Avenue), in the East Village, Manhattan, New York City, New York, 10003, United States
- Website: venierospastry.com

Veniero's Pasticceria & Caffè is an Italian bakery that was established in 1894, and is located at 342 East 11th Street (between First Avenue and Second Avenue), in the East Village neighborhood of Manhattan, New York City.

Founded by Antonio Veniero of Sorrento, the bakery was opened as a pool emporium and caffè where Veniero served his baked products to customers. Later, the demand for his pastries and cakes won him awards in Rome, Bologna and the New York World's Fair. The bakery has been continuously owned and operated by the Veniero family since its founding. In 1984 the family added an adjoining warm enclave, with a ceiling of stained-glass panels and the original pressed tin. Frank Zerilli changed the oven from coal to gas by the 1980s as well, and more recently Veniero's began selling carb-free cheesecakes and sugar-free cookies.

Pasticceria is Italian for "cake shop" or "confectioner's shop."

Veniero's is famous for its traditional and regional Italian confections, including handmade Italian butter cookies, biscotti, cannoli, sfogliatelle, tiramisù, and its New York staple cheesecake.

Veniero's was featured in the first New York City episode of Food Network's Road Tasted and has been featured on many other shows, including ABC's Good Morning America and Live with Regis and Kelly, and Steve Schirripa's Hungry on the cable channel Mag Rack. The bakery has also been the location for scenes on NBC's Law & Order. It was also featured on HBO's Curb Your Enthusiasm season 8, episode 76, in a comedic plot where the main character uses the bakery's hard crust Italian bread as an improvised weapon.

In 2010, Veniero's was named the winner for the Best Desserts in New York City by AOL's City's Best website. Furthermore, some food tour companies visit Veniero's as part of their programs.

== See also ==
- List of bakeries
- List of Italian restaurants
