= Matsugen =

Matsugen is the name of several Japanese restaurants owned by the Matsushita brothers located in Tokyo, Hawaii, and New York City. The New York Matsugen is co-owned by the Matsushita brothers and Jean-Georges, and received three stars from The New York Times.

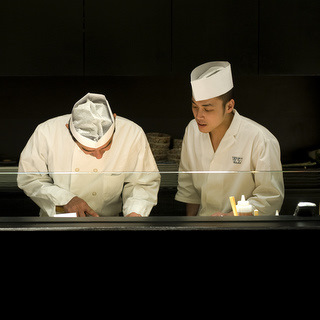
The three brothers

It has 15 bars and restaurants in Tokyo, including Matsugen.

== Hawaii branch ==
In 2007 the Matsushita brothers opened a new Matsugen in Hawaii. The head soba chef at the Hawaii Matsugen, Shingo Chibana, can be seen every day making the soba in the middle of the restaurant. Masashi Matsushita is based at this restaurant, but visits the New York and Tokyo locations regularly to update menus and work with the kitchen staff.

Matsugen on Hawaii was on the Food and Wine 2008 "Go List".

== New York City branch ==
Matsugen
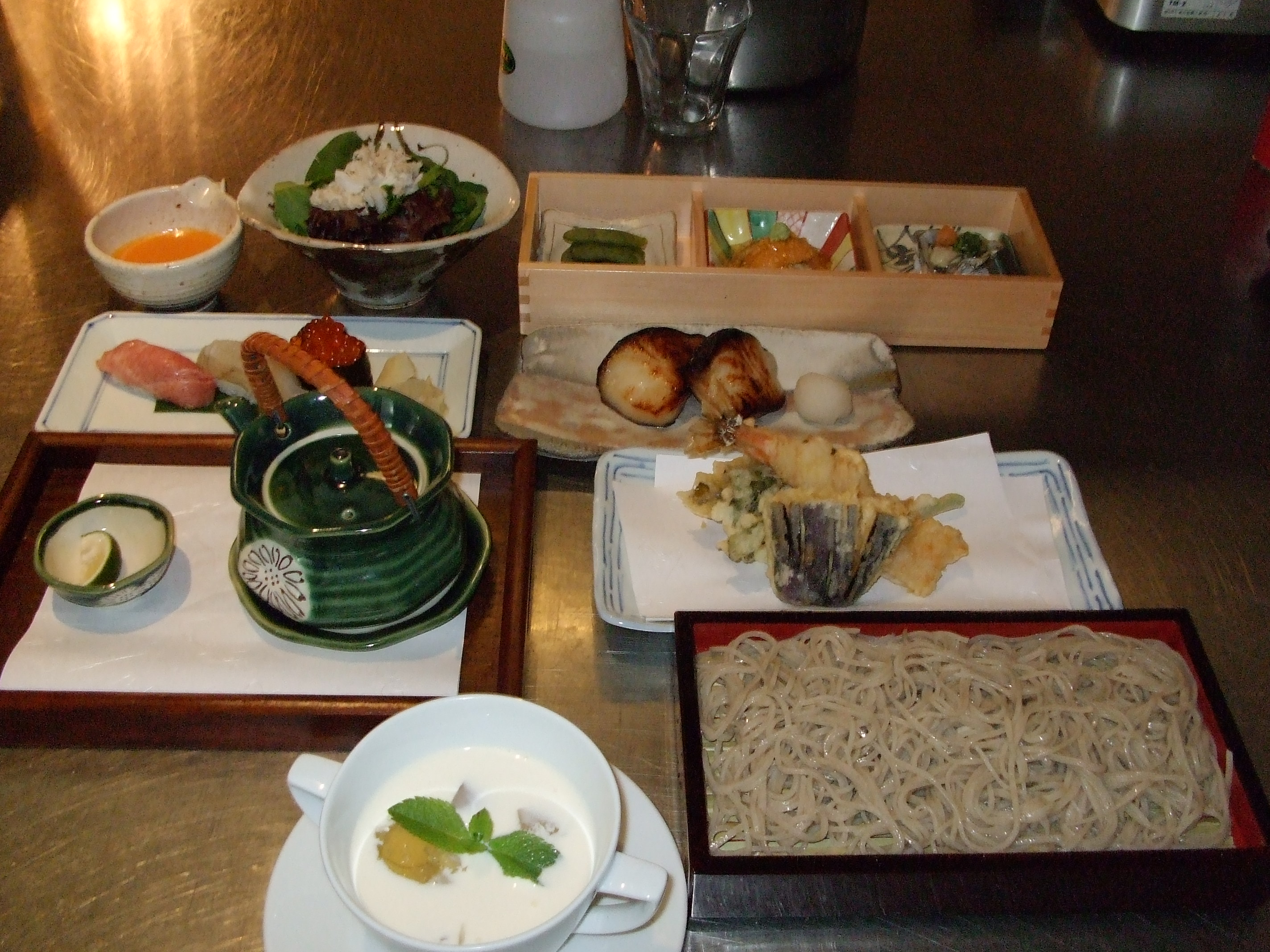

Restaurant information
- Established: 2008
- Closed: 2011
- Owners: The Matsushita Brothers, Jean-Georges
- Food type: Japanese
- Dress code: Casual
- Location: 241 Church Street, Manhattan, New York, 10013, United States
- Website: New York Official site

In 2000, Jean-Georges met with the Matsushita Brothers in Tokyo after dining at Matsugen. This sparked an opportunity to open in New York, where there was a lack of soba-inspired restaurants. Eight years later, in 2008, Matsugen in New York City was opened in partnership with Jean-Georges. Unlike the Matsugen in Tokyo, this Matsugen served more than just soba, bringing their father's experience in sushi to their own experience in soba The New York Matsugen also featured other traditional Japanese items including shabu-shabu and yakiniku.

The New York Matsugen took over Jean Georges' 66, a Chinese Restaurant that closed in April 2007. The original space was designed by Richard Meier, with a new interior by Thomas Juul Hansen. While the soba chef is not front and center in the New York Matsugen, the noodles are still made fresh each day and considered the highlight of the restaurants menu.

Takayuki Matsushita, the youngest brother, moved to New York to be the general manager of the New York Matsugen, along with five chefs from Tokyo. The Jean Georges Management Group coordinates all front of the house staff, who are trained in the Jean Georges style. The menu, however, is completely controlled by the Matsushita family, allowing them to maintain true Japanese cuisine.

Time Out New York awarded Matsugen the "Best New Japanese Restaurant" Award for 2009.

Matsugen closed in 2011 because their contract with Jean-Georges had expired.

== See also ==
- List of Japanese restaurants
