= Lucciola (restaurant) =

Italian trattoria restaurant in New York City

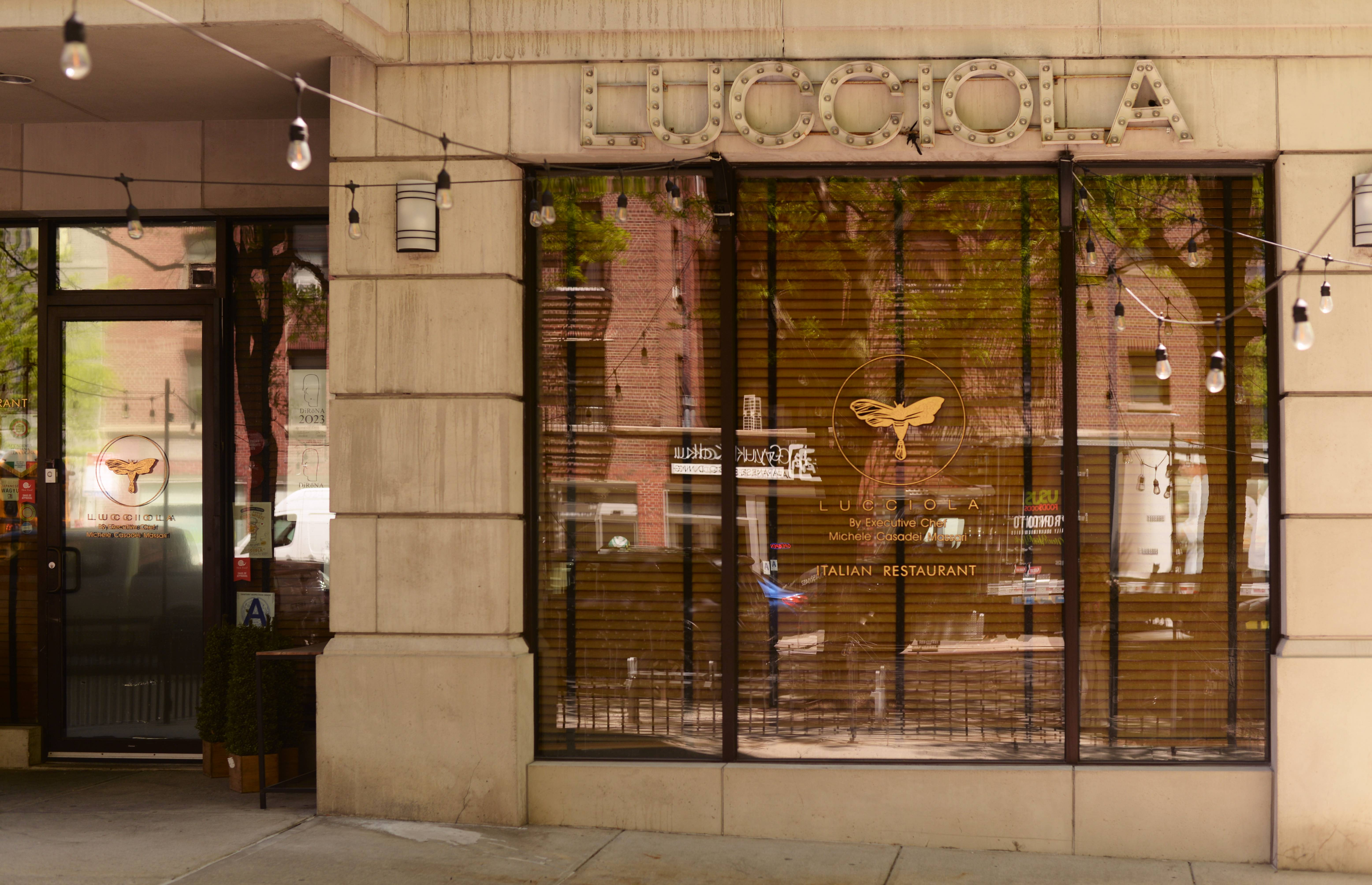
- Exterior of the restaurant
- Interactive map of Lucciola

Restaurant information
- Established: 2017
- Head chef: Michele Casadei Massari
- Location: 621 Amsterdam Avenue, New York, New York, 10024, United States
- Coordinates: 40°47′25″N 73°58′22″W
- Website: lucciolanyc.com

Lucciola is a 20-seat Italian fine dining on the Upper West Side, in New York. It was founded in 2017 by Chef Michele Casadei Massari along with Wine Director Alberto Ghezzi. It serves creative fine dining interpretations inspired by his roots from Emilia Romagna, such as recipes with balsamic vinegar from Modena, Parmigiano Reggiano, Tortellini, and "Latte in piedi", a dessert made of milk, typical of Bologna. The name "Lucciola" means firefly, and was inspired by Pasolini article. It won the Wine Spectator Award for its 1450 bottle cellar, and has a wine club where the patrons can taste several bottles with the wine producers. In 2026 was awarded "Tre Forchette" from Gambero Rosso.

== History ==
Lucciola is the second restaurant by Chef Michele Casadei Massari, with Piccolo Cafe being the first one. It paid homage to Festa di Laurea director Pupi Avati. Piccolo Cafe was a bistro coffee chain, closed during the COVID-19 pandemic.

The restaurant has a blog where news, stories from the Chef and updates are available to readers and patrons.
