= Piccolo Cafe =

American fast casual restaurant chain

- Company type: Private
- Industry: Restaurants
- Genre: Fast casual
- Founded: 2009
- Founder: Michele C. Massari; Alberto Ghezzi
- Headquarters: New York City, New York, United States
- Number of locations: 4
- Area served: North America
- Products: Salads • Panini • Pasta • Gelato • Soups
- Website: piccolocafe.us

Piccolo Cafe is a chain of fast casual restaurants that serves salads, panini, pasta, gelato and espresso. It was founded in 2009 in New York City and now has 4 locations throughout New York City. It serves typical food from the Italian city of Bologna located in the area of Emilia Romagna.

== History ==
Founded in 2009 by Michele Casadei Massari, the restaurant was opened to public in 2010. It mainly aimed at imported Italian foods such as Italian espresso and prosciutto. The restaurant started its operation in three more locations in New York, making them four in total. In 2014, Piccolo Cafe started a catering services for private and public sector.
