= Papaya King =

Restaurant in New York City

Coordinates: 40.7786°N 73.9535°W

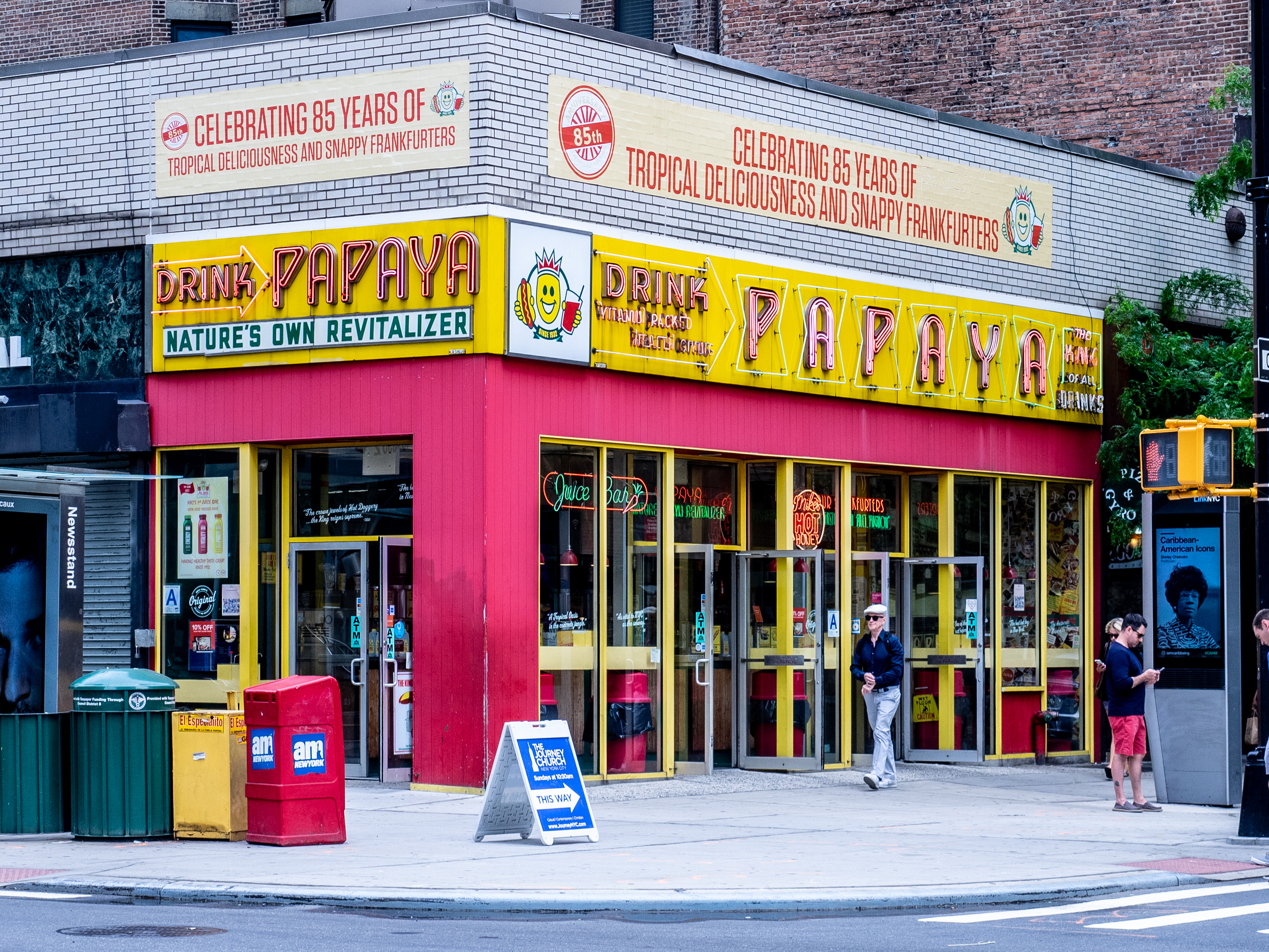
- Original Papaya King location, 86th St. and 3rd Ave
- Type: Fast food restaurant
- Founded: 1932; 94 years ago in New York City
- Founder: Constantine "Gus" Poulos
- Number of locations: 1 (2018)
- Areas served: New York City

Papaya King is a fast food restaurant on the Upper East Side of Manhattan in New York City.

== History ==
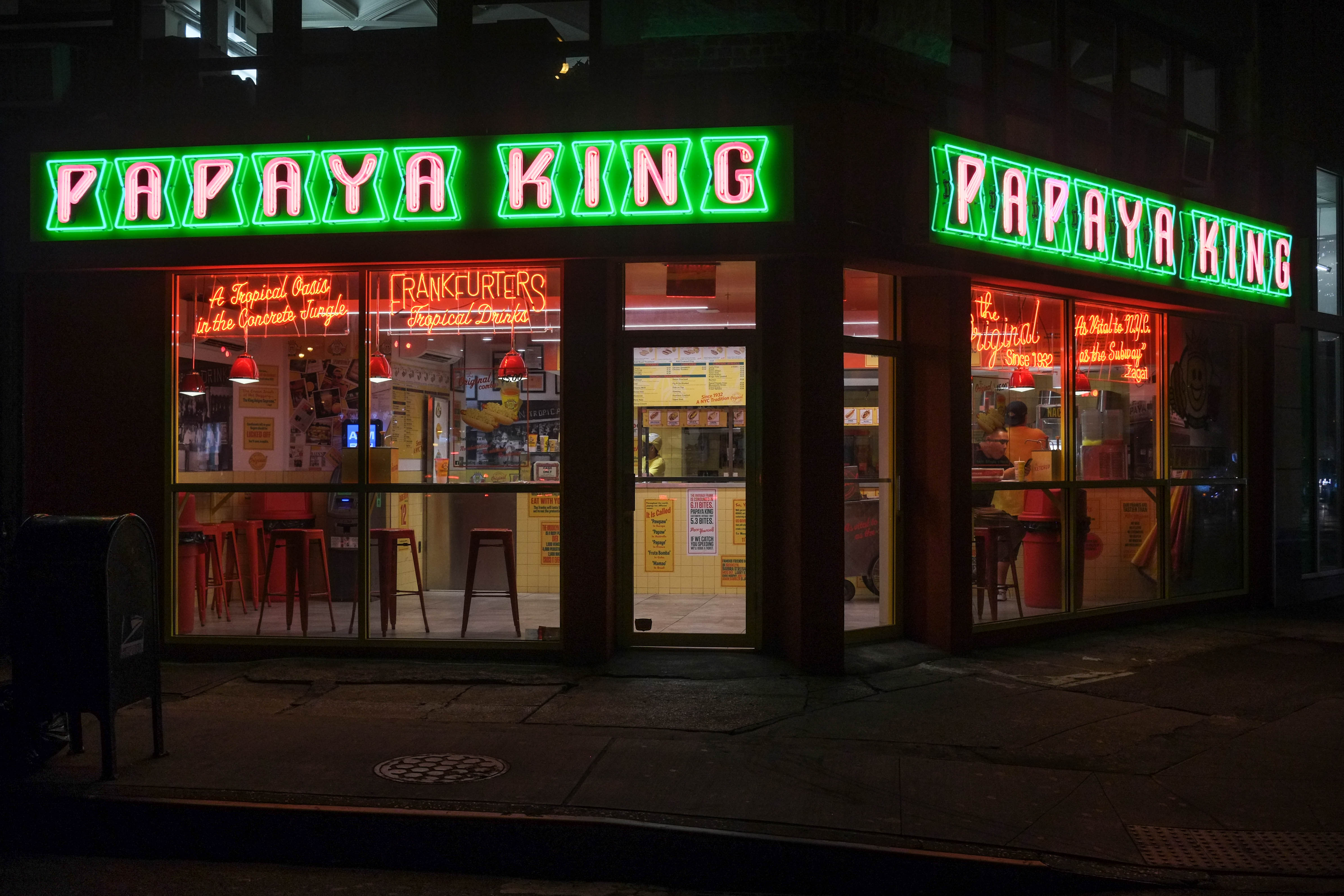
Restaurant exterior

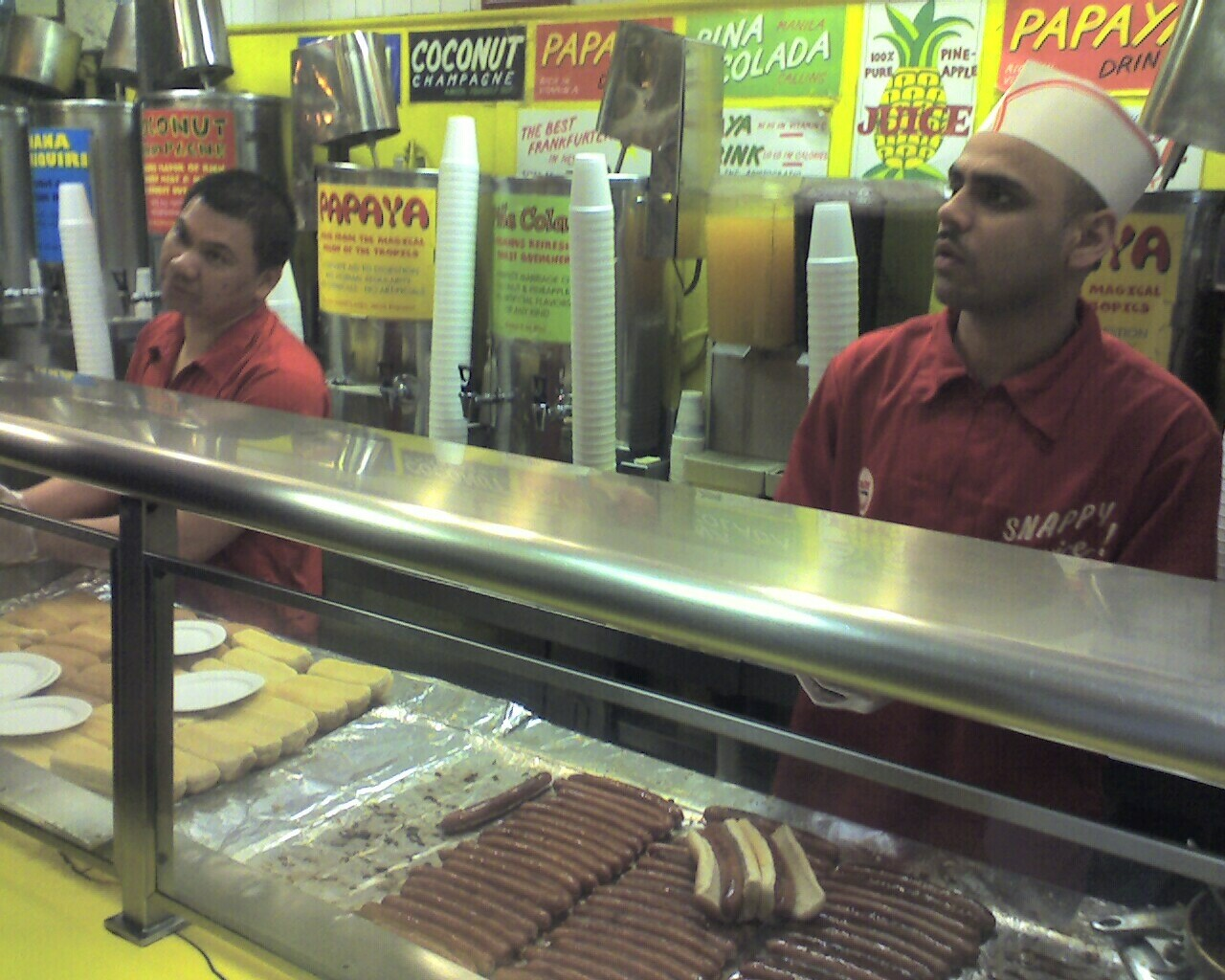
Prep counter

Papaya King was founded and run for many years by the late Constantine "Gus" Poulos. The original Papaya King was opened in 1932 on the corner of 86th Street and Third Avenue on the Upper East Side of Manhattan. Although the restaurant originally only served drinks made from fresh tropical fruits, it soon expanded to serving hot dogs due to the influence of its neighborhood, which at the time was populated predominantly by German-American immigrants. It also served crispy curly fries, onion rings, fried pickles, fried Oreos, fried Twinkies, tater tots, knishes, cheese steaks and corn dogs.

Gus's son Peter started out managing the family's second store (with seating) at 87th Street and Third Avenue, before taking over the business from his father. In the 1930s, there was also a store in Upper Darby Township, Pennsylvania. During the 1970s, the Pouloses attempted to franchise the restaurant, and one franchise briefly opened in midtown. A company-owned store opened in the 1980s at 59th Street and Third Avenue and closed in the mid-1990s. In 2001, another company-owned store opened in Philadelphia, this time on the campus of the University of Pennsylvania at 40th and Locust Streets; it closed in 2004. In 2006, another attempted franchise opened briefly in the food court at Roosevelt Field Mall on Long Island, in Garden City, New York. The Poulos family sold the business in the early 2000s.

Papaya King opened a restaurant at 1645 Wilcox Avenue in Hollywood (Los Angeles) California in 2011, but it had closed by the beginning of 2013. In May 2013, Papaya King opened a concept store on St. Marks Place, a historical and cultural crossroads in New York City’s East Village neighborhood. The store featured a recessed patio area in front, widely referred to as "the stoop", where customers and locals gathered. The store featured many of the classic elements that characterize the 86th Street location, with additional experiences such as vintage arcade games, a projector screen, a sound system, and branded merchandise. This location closed in November 2017 when the building was sold to a real estate developer. During the summer of 2014, Papaya King opened its first food truck that is parked throughout Manhattan and Brooklyn.

In May 2016, Papaya King expanded to Brooklyn and opened a third restaurant on the corner of Nevins Street and Flatbush Avenue in Downtown Brooklyn. This location mirrored the look of the original location on the Upper East Side. At some point during 2017–2018, this restaurant closed.

In 2016, Papaya King started franchising with two locations in Las Vegas. The first opened on November 14, 2016 across from the Hard Rock Hotel, and a second 24-hour location opened at the Hawaiian Marketplace in March 2017. The Las Vegas locations were much larger than the counter-service-only restaurants in New York, and had full liquor licenses and waiter service. It was reported in November 2017, however, that both locations had closed.

In 2022, it emerged that the original 86th and 3rd location was at risk of closure. The building had been purchased by Extell Development Company and rather than continue taking Papaya King's rent, Extell announced plans to demolish the one-story building and replace it with a high rise. In April 2023, it was announced that Papaya King would reopen in a larger space across the street from the original location, at 1535 Third Avenue, but in January it was announced that a dispute with the new landlord had caused the arrangement to be called off. Papaya King reopened on July 6, 2024, at 206 East 86th Street, half a block from its original location.
