= Cuisine of New York City =

The cuisine of New York City consists of many cuisines that have been imported by immigrant communities. Almost all ethnic cuisines are present in New York.

The city's New York Restaurant Week started in 1992 and has spread due to the discounted prices that are offered. New York hosts over 12,000 bodegas, delis, and groceries that supply those who enjoy these cuisines.

== Food identified with New York ==
=== Food associated with or popularized in New York ===
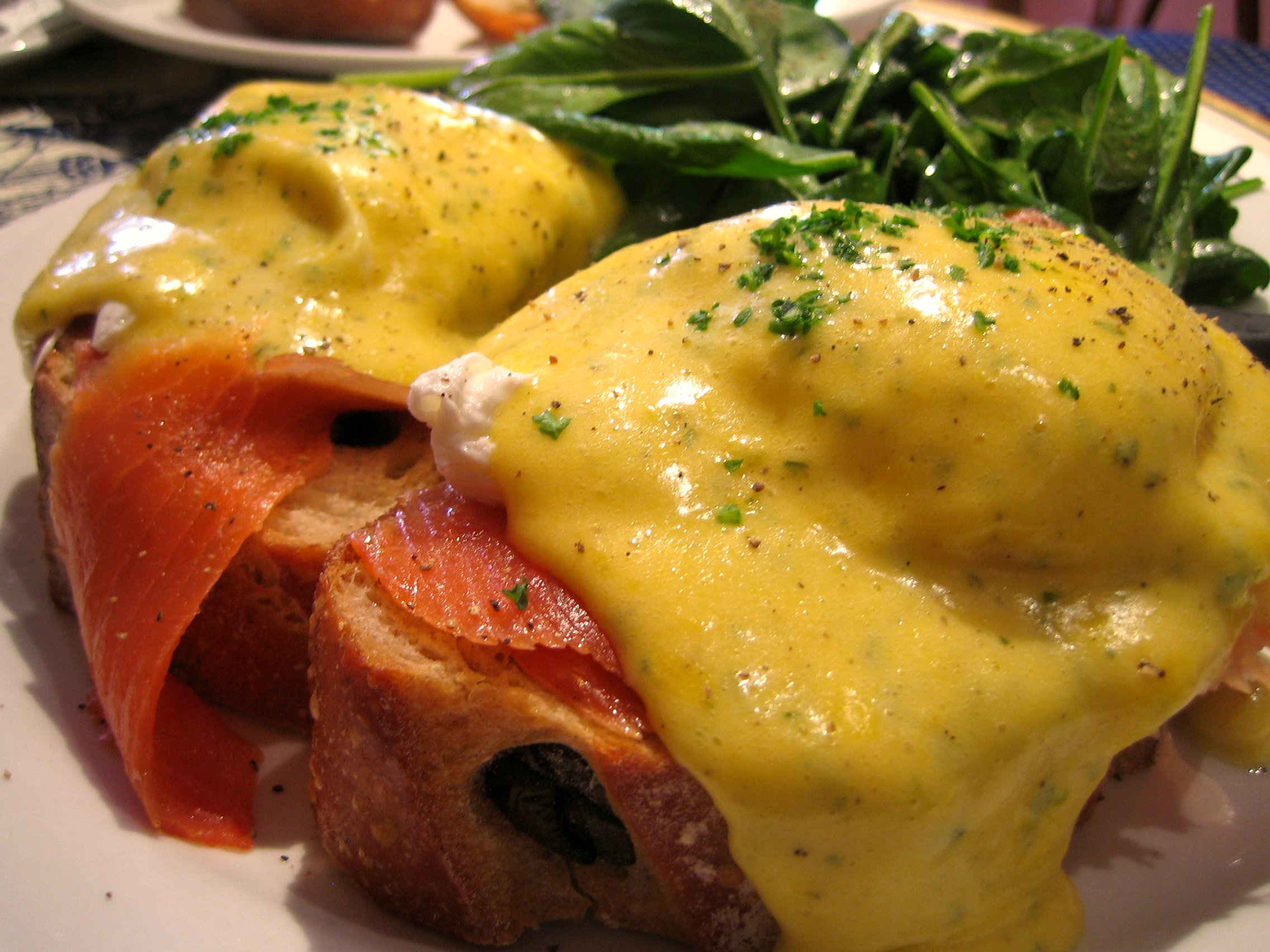
A variant of Eggs benedict made with smoked salmon

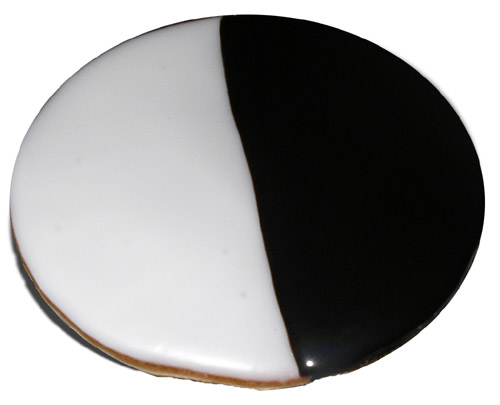
Black and white cookie

- Bacon, egg and cheese sandwich, on a bagel or on a roll
- Black and white cookie
- Chopped cheese
- Corned beef
- Delmonico steak
- Doughnuts
- Eggs Benedict, generally regarded as having been popularized by the Waldorf
- Food from a Halal cart
- Hot dogs – often out of a hot dog cart, served with sauerkraut, sweet relish, onion sauce, or mustard.
- Knish
- Lobster Newberg, generally regarded as having been popularized by Delmonico's
- Manhattan clam chowder
- New York-style cheesecake
- New York-style pizza
- New York-style bagel
- New York-style pastrami
- Sausage and peppers
- Waldorf salad, first created at the Waldorf

==== Ashkenazi Jewish cuisine ====
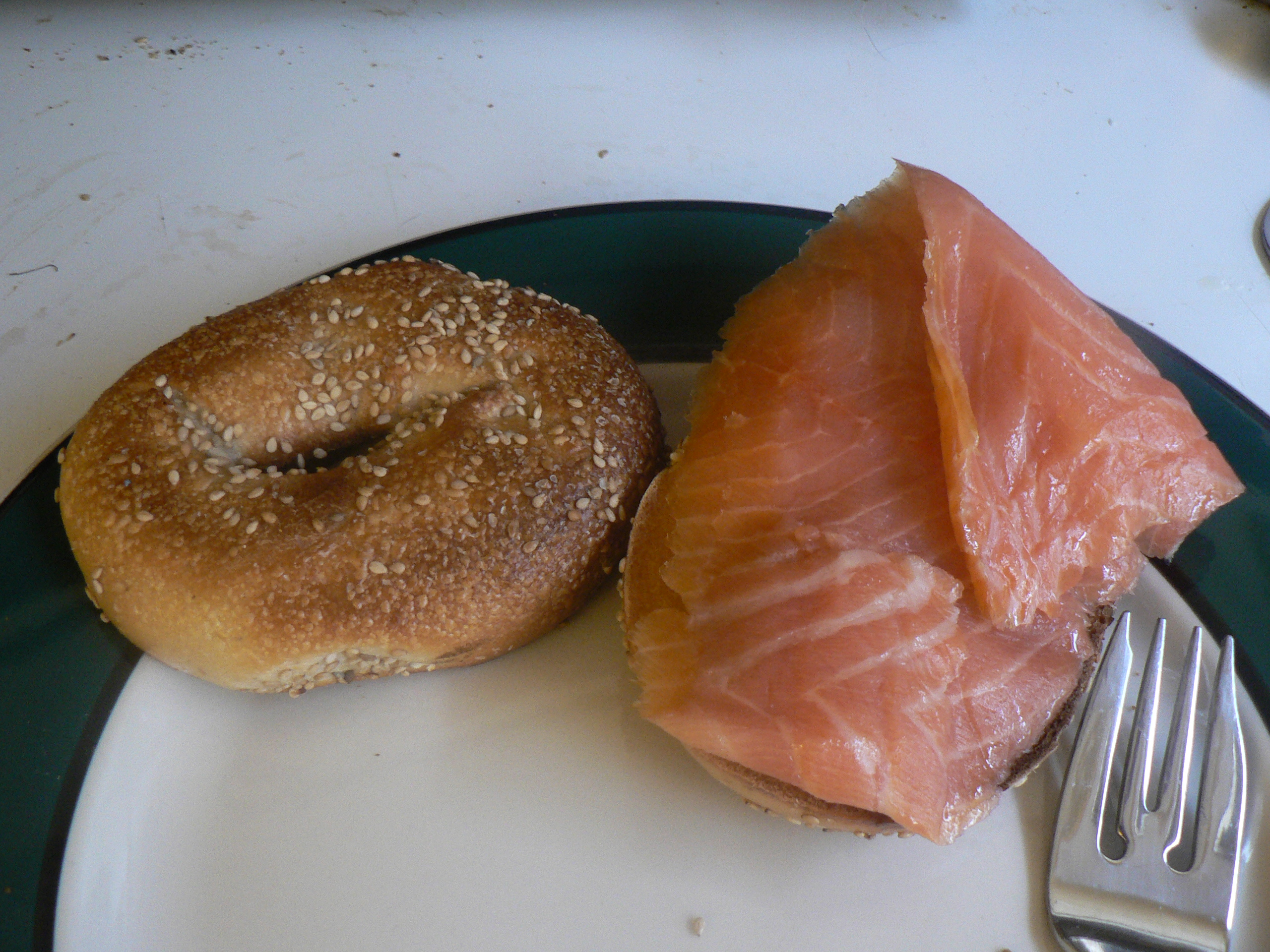
Bagel and lox

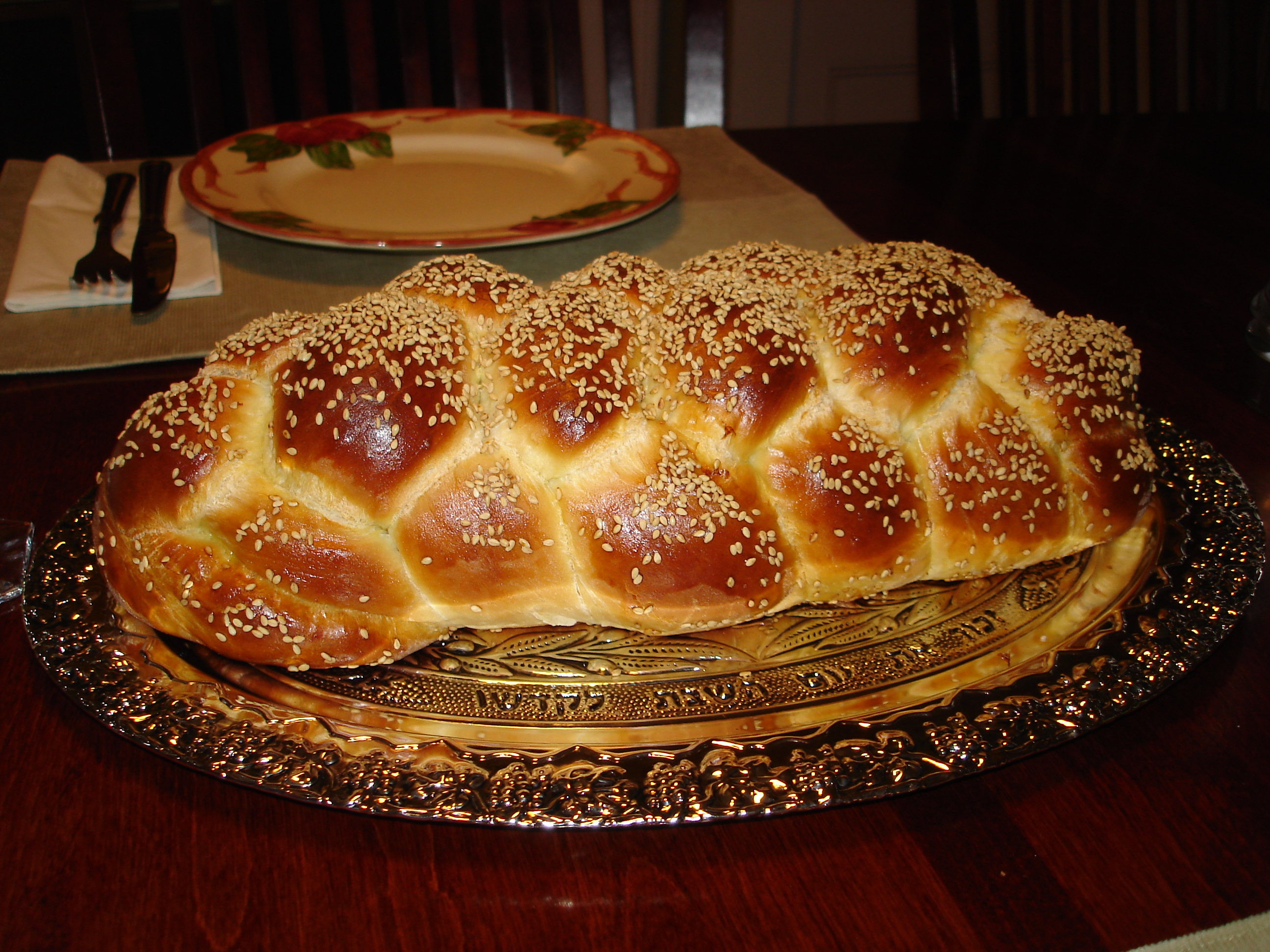
Challah

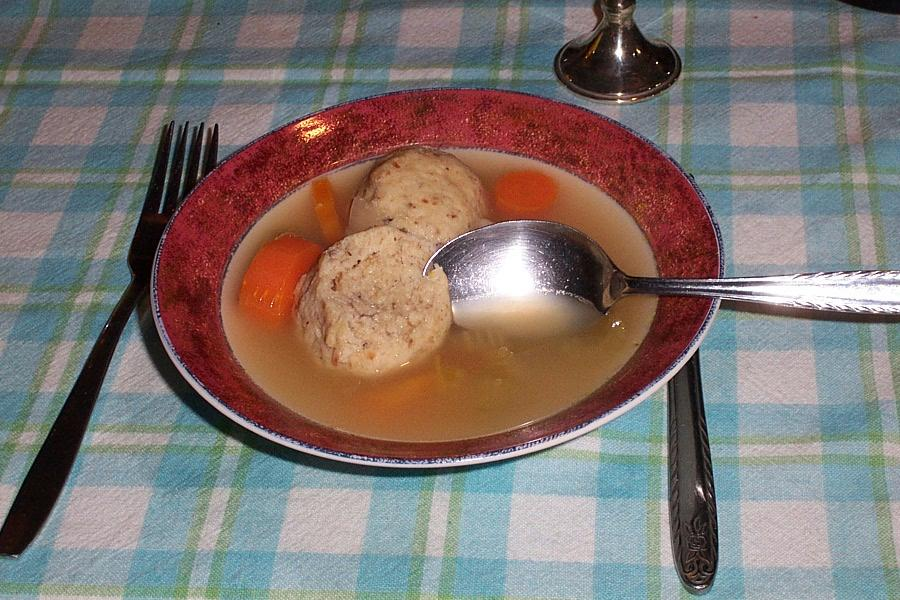
Matzo ball soup

New York's large community of Ashkenazi Jews and their descendants brought many dishes to the city.

The New York institution of the delicatessen or "deli" was originally an institution of the city's Jewry. Much of New York's Jewish fare is popular worldwide, especially bagels. New York City's Jewish community also enjoys Chinese food, and many members of this community think of it as their second ethnic cuisine.)

- Bagel and cream cheese
- Bagels and lox (see also: appetizing)
- Bialy
- Blintzes
- Brisket
- Celery soda
- Challah bread
- Chopped chicken liver
- Corned beef
- Cream cheese
- Egg cream
- Gefilte fish
- Kishka
- Knish
- Lokshen soup
- Matzo
- Matzo ball soup
- Pastrami, pastrami on rye
- Potato kugel
- Potato pancake
- Pickled cucumbers (especially dill pickles)
- Tongue
- Whitefish with and without pike

=== Bodega food ===
Bodegas are convenience stores in New York City that stock a wide range of items, such as snacks, candies, and hot prepared food. Bodegas can be found on nearly every corner; they provide items shoppers might have neglected to buy from a supermarket. The word "bodega" originated from the Spanish word for small stores or groceries. Bodegas are important to their communities; customers trust them as a location for safety and meeting with neighbors, and many have a resident cat. Some bodegas are open up to 24 hours, 7 days a week.

==== Chopped cheese ====
The chopped cheese is a sandwich that is one of the bodega's best-known menu items. This sandwich consists of chopped ground beef with onions, condiments melted cheese, tomatoes, and lettuce. It can either be served on a roll or a hero. The chopped cheese has been mentioned in popular music, for example in rap lyrics. This sandwich is widely popular but there have been controversies, such as issues with pricing and gentrification, but it remains a staple in New York City bodegas. Despite arguments about its origin, the chopped cheese sandwich is linked to Harlem and the Bronx.

==== Bacon, egg and cheese ====
The bacon, egg and cheese sandwich (BEC) is made with bacon, eggs that are either scrambled or fried, and cheese, and is served on a bagel, hero, or roll. This sandwich is common and well known in New York City. This sandwich is a "morning sandwich"; it is known for being quickly prepared and for its affordability. Food critic Robert Sietsema has described the BEC as deli "haute cuisine." Although many U.S. cities have similar sandwiches, the BEC stands out for its popularity and accessibility.

=== Chinese-American cuisine ===
==== History ====
Many Chinese immigrants arrived in New York through long migration routes that often began in southern China, especially Guangdong Province and later Fujian Province. In the 19th century, many immigrants first traveled by ship to the west coast of the United States during the California Gold Rush and the construction of the transcontinental railroad. After facing discrimination and laws such as the Chinese Exclusion Act of 1882, some Chinese immigrants moved eastward and settled in cities such as New York.

During the late 19th and early 20th centuries, immigration patterns changed significantly after the Immigration and Nationality Act of 1965. New immigrants arrived directly by airplane from Fujian, Sichuan, Shanghai, and northern China, bringing regional cooking traditions, recipes, and ingredients.

Today, neighborhoods such as Manhattan Chinatown, Flushing in Queens, and Brooklyn's Sunset Park remain major centers of Chinese food culture in New York City. Chinese cuisine continues to evolve through globalization, regional fusion, and modern culinary innovation while preserving many traditional cooking practices.

==== Chop suey ====
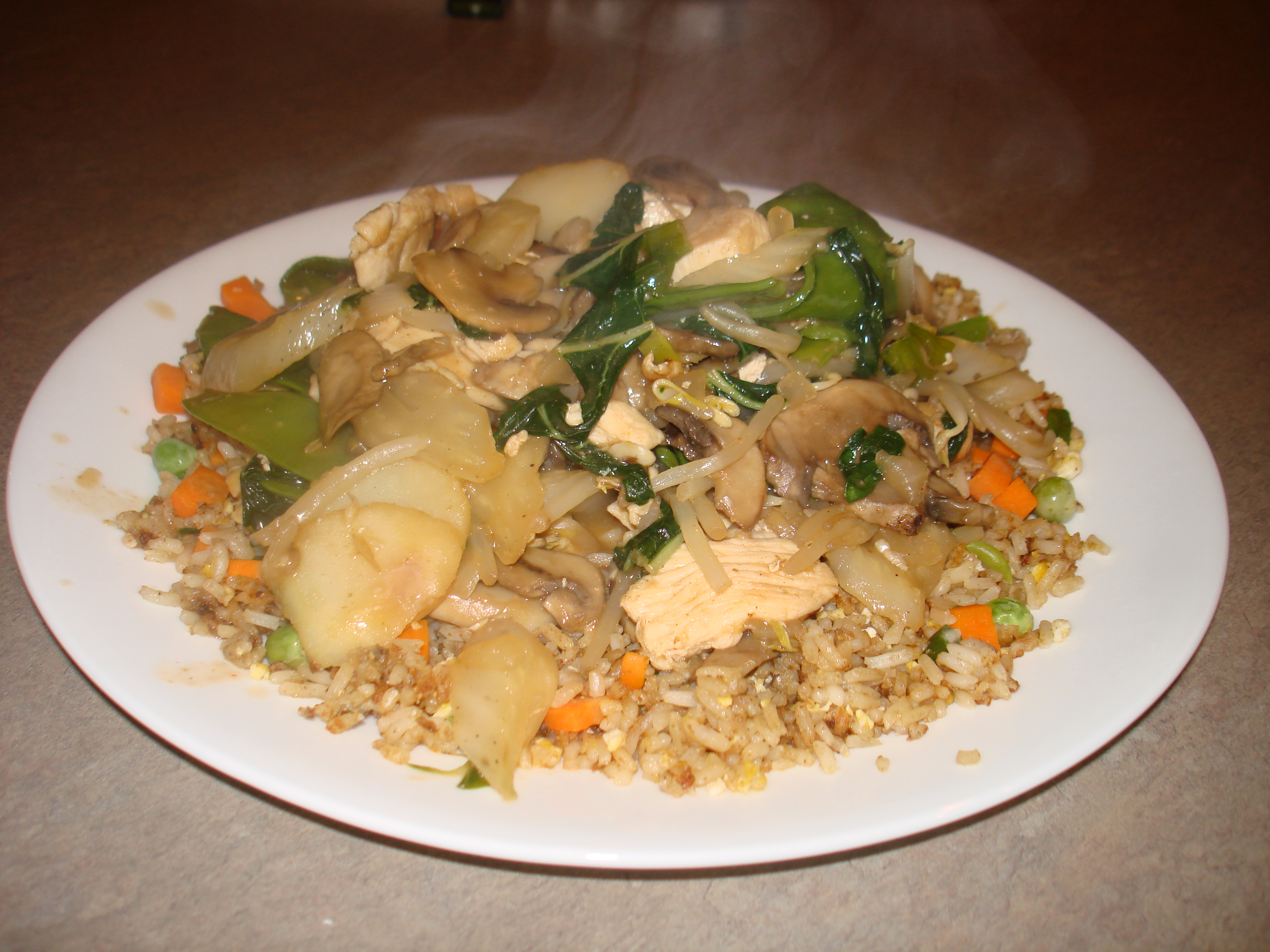
chop suey

Chop suey (/ˈtʃɒpˈsuːi/; simplified Chinese: 杂碎; traditional Chinese: 雜碎; Pinyin: zá suì; Zhuyin Fuhao: ㄗㄚˊㄙㄨㄟˋ )is an American Chinese food with mixed meat slices and vegetables, usually served over rice. The dish became popular in New York City during the late nineteenth century and appeared on New York restaurant menus as early as 1896. Chinese immigrant restaurants introduced chop suey to both Chinese and non-Chinese diners, making it one of the earliest Chinese-American foods widely associated with New York's Chinatown. It literally means variety (杂) of broken (碎) ingredients.

==== Chow mein ====
chow mein

Chow mein (/ˈtʃaʊ ˈmeɪn/ and /ˈtʃaʊ ˈmiːn/; simplified Chinese: 炒面; traditional Chinese: 炒麵; Pinyin: chǎo miàn; Zhuyin Fuhao:ㄔㄠˇ ㄇㄧㄢˋ; Cantonese Yale: cháaumihn) is a main dish of Chinese stir-fried noodles with vegetables and sometimes meat or tofu that originated in Guangdong Province. To suit the taste of East Coast American, New York restaurants often served chow mein with meat, gravy, and crispy fried noodles, creating a version that differed from those commonly found in China. The dish became popular in New York during the twentieth century.

==== General Tso's chicken ====
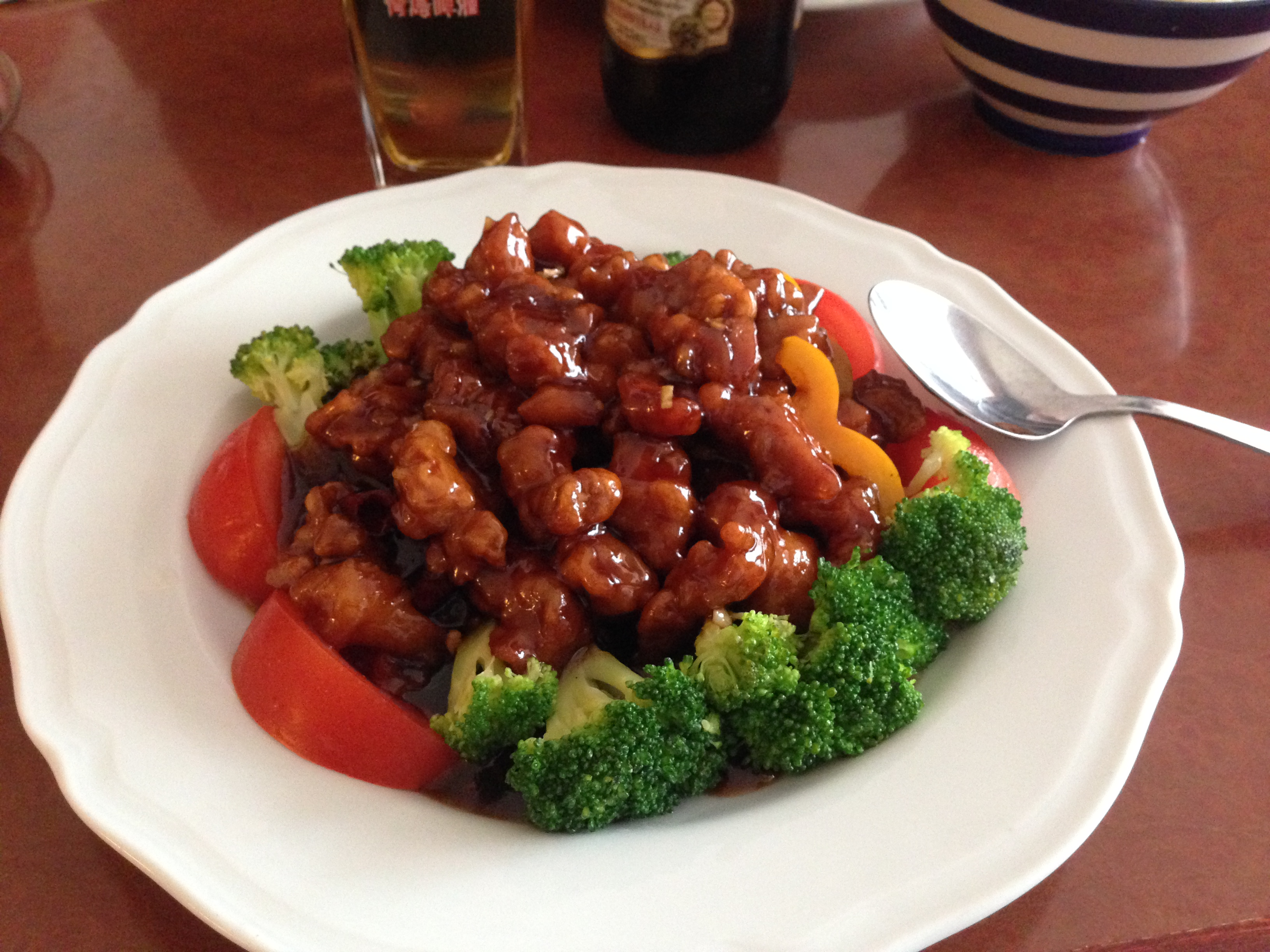
general Tso's chicken

General Tso's chicken (/soʊ/; simplified Chinese: 左宗棠鸡; traditional Chinese: 左宗棠雞; Pinyin: zuǒ zōng táng jī; Zhuyin Fuhao: ㄗㄨㄛˇ ㄗㄨㄥˉ ㄊㄤˊ ㄐㄧˉ ) is a deep-fried chicken dish from Canton. It was literally named by Zuo Zongtang (Tso Tsung-t'ang), a Qing dynasty statesman and military leader. The dish was popularized in New York City by chef Peng Chang-kuei after he opened a Hunan restaurant in 1973. Food historians often identify New York as the place where General Tso's chicken evolved into the version that became famous across the United States.

=== Chino-Latino cuisine ===
Chino-Latino cuisine in New York is primarily associated with the immigration of Chinese Cubans following the Cuban Revolution. Chino-Latino dishes include:

- Chicken and broccoli
- Cuban chicharrones de pollo
- Egg drop soup
- Fried pork chop
- Fried rice
- Lumpiang Shanghai
- Oxtail stew
- Sesame chicken
- White rice with black beans and churrasco

=== Coffee and dessert culture in New York ===
Dessert and coffee shops in New York City have played a significant role in the culinary history of New York City, despite the city's stronger association with savory foods such as pizza, bagels, and deli cuisine. The coffee and dessert culture in New York City history reflects the city's culinary diversity and immigrant influences.

The culture of desserts and coffee is very diverse. This is due to its variety of immigrants who decided to share their national food and write their history in the city through the use of cuisine, from Taiwanese-origin boba drinks to Mexican concha. Colombian, Dutch bakeries, and Taiwanese teas can be found around the city, a combination of different cultures and cuisines.

Immigrant communities influenced the development of coffee culture in New York City through the importation and consumption of coffee from countries such as Brazil, Colombia, Venezuela, Vietnam and El Salvador. In the 21st century, New York City has been recognized for having one of the largest concentrations of coffee shops in the United States.

=== Coffee ===
In New York City, since its origin, coffee became an important part of culture and part of the industry, to the point that emerged along Wall Street in the late 18th century having all social classes buying it in what was called in that time "Coffee Houses". Getting into the 19th century these coffee houses started growing in Lower Manhattan and not just that, but it started to be more popular due to being located in shared places as restaurants and bars.

=== Dessert ===
==== Doughnuts ====
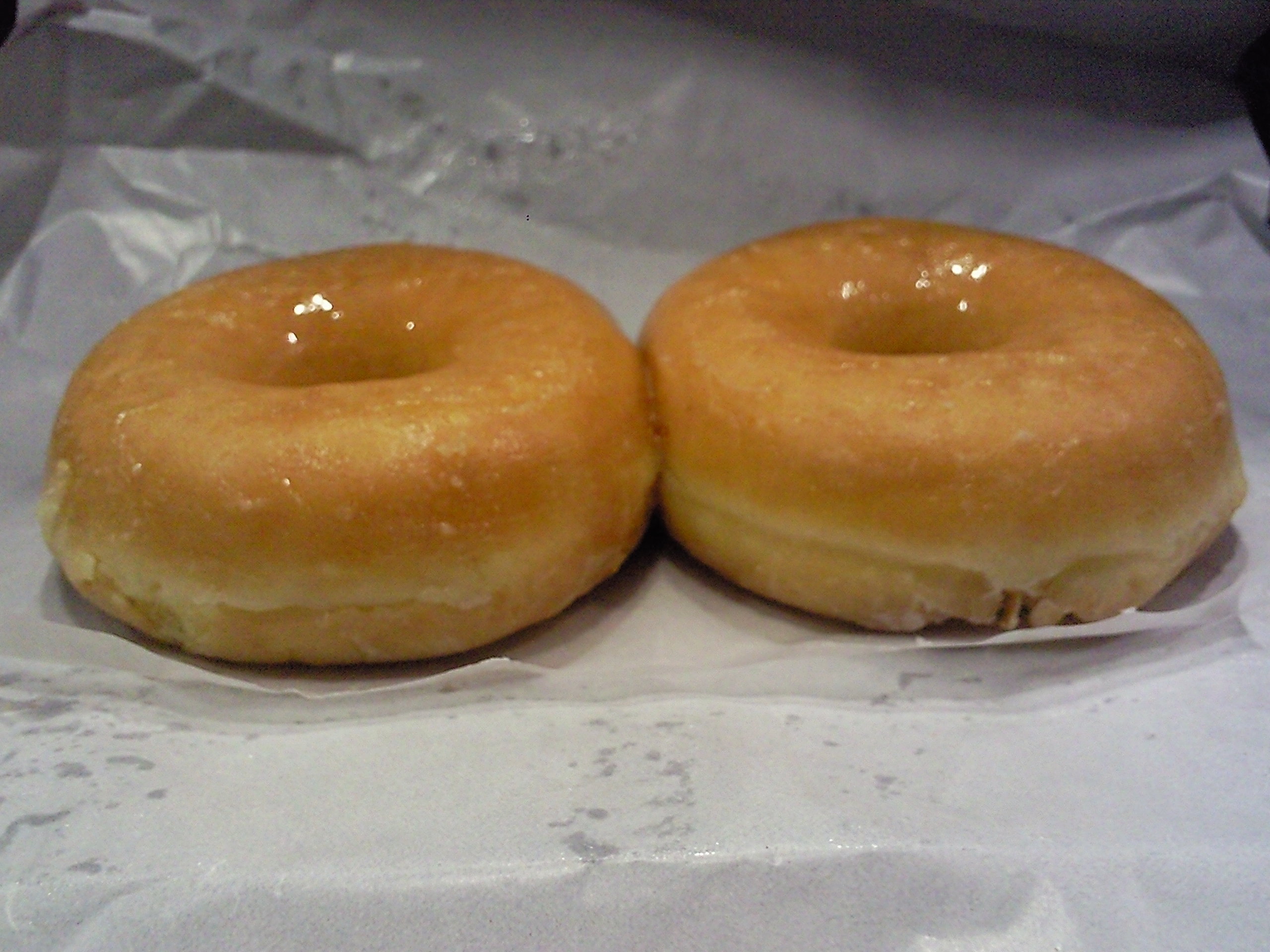
doughnut

One of the most popular desserts in New York History are doughnuts, however, doughnuts are not originally from New York. America's first doughnut shop was opened in 1673 by a Dutch woman named Anna Joralemon who sold her doughnuts "olykoeks" how they were called that time, which means "oil cakes", on Broadway near Maiden Lane. The word “doughnuts” first appeared in 1809, when Washington Irving described a Dutch meal in his A History of New York: “sweetened dough, fried in hog's fat, and called doughnuts".

When this "Olykoeks" first appear, they did not have the ring shape as we know it nowadays, instead they were stuffed with fruits and nuts in the middle, eventually it evolved over the time into what we know today.

===== Black and White Cookies =====
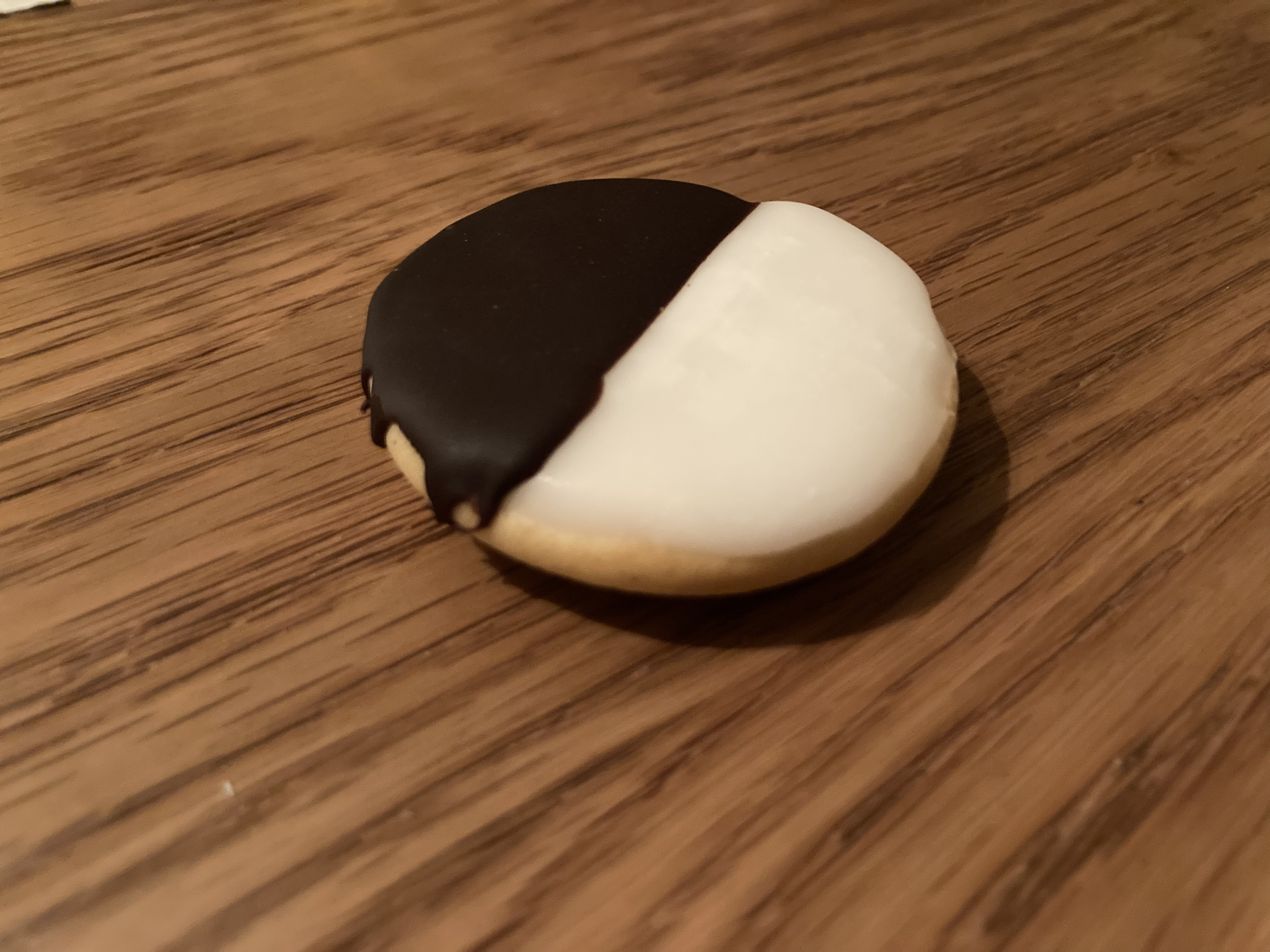
Black and White Cookie

The word “cookie” comes from the Dutch word “koekje,” which it's similar to English. the world "koekje" literally translates to the English "little cake". Dutch Immigrants brought cookies to the U.S in the 17th and 18th centuries, presenting them as these "little cakes".

Inspired by Utica's half moon cookies, the black and white cookies' original recipe was made by Bavarian immigrants John and Justine Glaser who opened Glaser's Bake Shop in 1902 in Manhattan's Yorkville, introducing New Yorkers to this vanilla and chocolate pastry. Three generations of their family were involved in the business that specialized in cookies, pastries, and tarts, bringing German influence into New York City's cuisine. Glaser's closed after 116 years of service on July 1, 2018.

=== Colombian-American Cuisine ===
==== History ====
Colombians first immigrated to the United States during the 1800s, but would not form known communities until after World War I. In 2025, states like Florida (443,276), New York (186,656), New Jersey (149,102), Texas (101,927), and California (11,214) hold large communities of Colombian American population making them the largest South American Latino group in the United States.

The number of Columbian Americans was minimal until 1940, when a surge in Colombian immigration started taking place. After World War I, the first community of Colombian origin was fully formed and established in New York City by professionals like nurses, pharmacists, accountants and bilingual secretaries. Most immigrants first settled in Manhattan until the late 1970s when they started to settle in nearby boroughs like Jackson Heights and Queens. Many of these Colombian-Americans opened restaurants, introducing neighborhoods nearby to their traditional dishes.

==== Food ====
Jackson Heights In Queens, New York is home to a variety of sub-neighborhoods that bring cultures together from Asia to South America. Between the streets of 79th and 84th street across Roosevelt Avenue, "Little Colombia" became a popular residential area for Colombians after the 1960s recession in Colombia pushed many out of their homeland in search of economic stability. Drug trafficking during the 1980s in Colombia brought an even bigger wave of Colombian immigrants who were fleeing from extreme volatility caused by powerful drug cartels, and Jackson Heights was identified as a landmark point for all Colombians.

===== Pollos a la Brasa Mario =====
Pollos a la Brasa Mario, one of the most popular spots in Roosevelt Avenue just below the 7 line train, had a major role in shaping what is now known as "Little Colombia" for the last three decades. The family-owned restaurant offers a taste of Colombian cuisine to both locals and tourists.

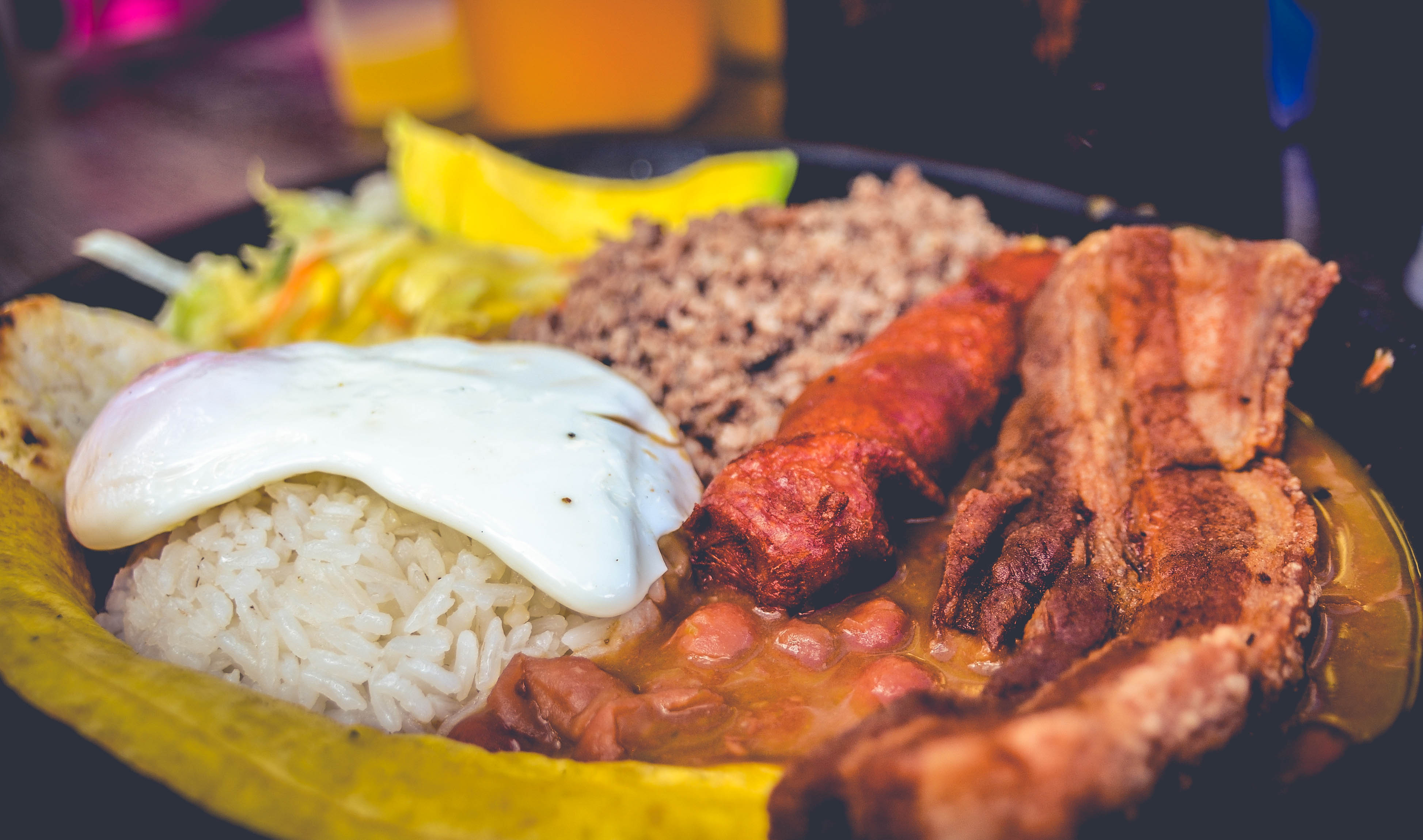
Colombia's unofficial traditional dish

Bandeja paisa, a dish loaded with white rice, red beans, ground beef, crispy chicharrón (pork belly), chorizo, morcilla (blood sausage), a fried egg, sweet plantain, arepa, and avocado, a typical dish that is served in Jackson Heights.

Sancocho, a soup filled with corn, yuca, plantain and meat (chicken, beef or fish) is another popular dish Colombians have brought to Jackson Heights.

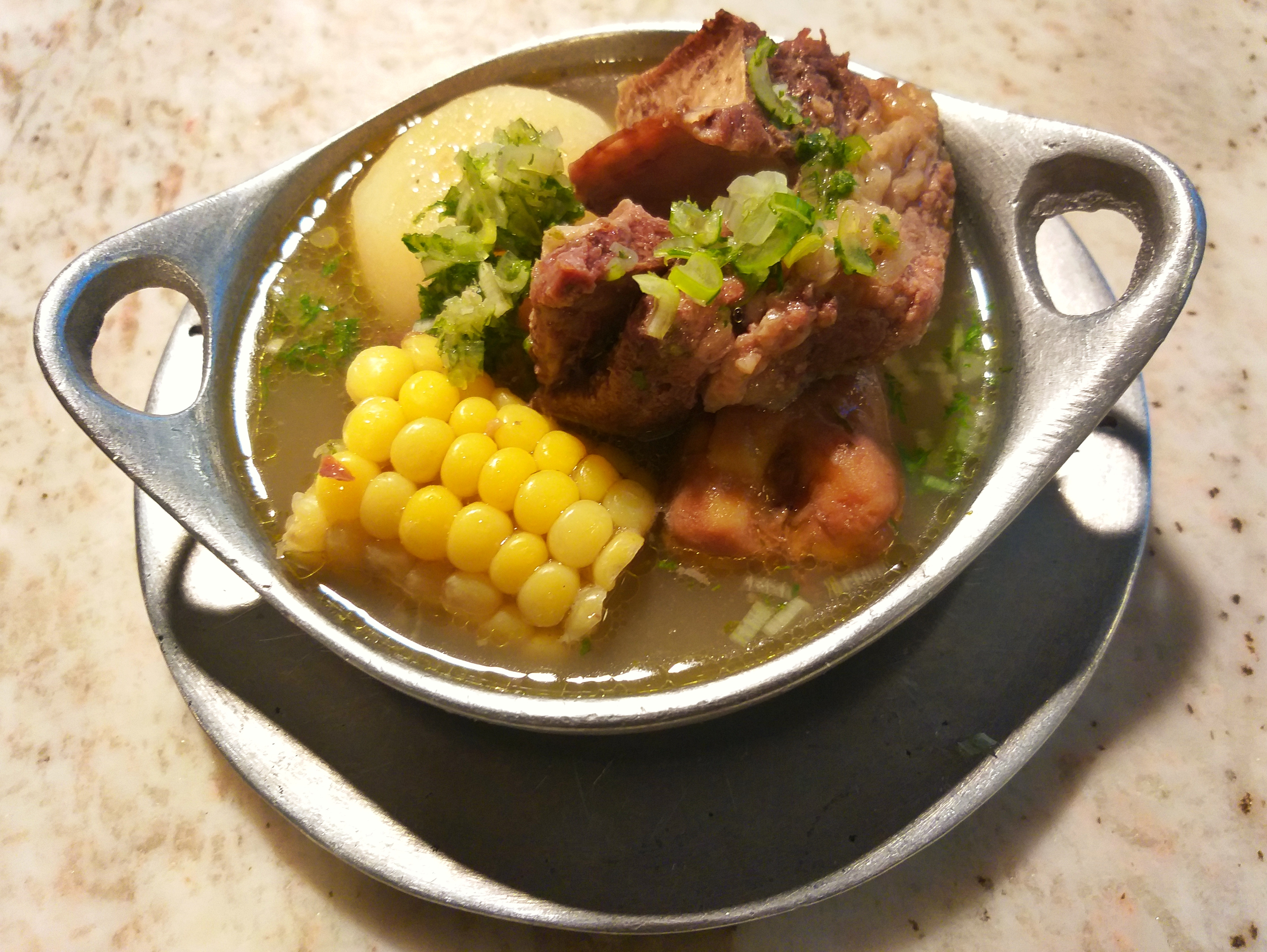
Colombian Sancocho

===== Arepa Lady =====
"Arepa Lady" was brought to life by Maria Cano, a Colombian immigrant who came to New York in 1984 and started selling her most known dish arepas.

Popular since the 1990s, Cano has become a food celebrity in the game, allowing her to open up restaurants serving Columbian's famous snack. "Arepa Lady" can be located at 77-17 37th Ave, Jackson Heights, NY 11372.

=== Italian-American cuisine ===
New York's large community of Italian-Americans and their descendants brought many dishes from Italy and adapted them to the ingredients available there, notably New York-style pizza.

- Arancini
- Calzone
- Cannoli
- Cappuccino
- Chicken parmigiana
- Espresso
- Fried calamari
- Italian bread
- Italian hero
- Italian ice/Granita
- New York-style Italian ice
- New York-style pizza
- Panelle
- Pani câ meusa
- Pasta primavera
- Penne alla vodka
- Rainbow cookies
- Sausage and peppers
- Sfogliatella
- Sicilian bread
- Sicilian style pizza
- Spaghetti and meatballs

=== Mexican Cuisine In New York City ===
The numbers of Mexican immigrants migrating to the U.S. were low in the 1900s but April 17, 1907 was considered the busiest day in New York City when over 11,000 immigrants entered through Ellis Island. Ever since, it was increasing yet decreasing in some years until the 1970s when almost a million Mexican Immigrants appeared in the United States. It increased dramatically in 2000 when over 9 million more moved in and by 2007, a total of more than 12 million Mexican immigrants living in the U.S. with more than half were unauthorized. In the recent years, New York City has about over 3 million immigrants living within.

In the 1920s to 1930s, East Harlem was one of the part of New York City that was influenced by Mexican foods during the Harlem Renaissance. This was an early neighborhood with a Mexican community.

In 1938, one of the first Mexican food entrepreneurs that owned a Mexican restaurant in New York City was named Juvencio Maldonado. His restaurant was located at 146 West 46th Street in Times Square. The restaurant was called "Xochitl" which is a Nahuatl word translating to "flower." From late 1930s to 1980s, the number of Mexican restaurants, grocery, and other related businesses in New York City steadily increased but was still difficult to find.

In the 1980s, their cuisine gained notice when Mexican immigrants started food businesses with trucks, pushcarts, bakeries, or restaurants. The most common examples were taco trucks or tamales pushcarts. The locations known for selling the majority of Mexican dishes were in East Harlem, Bronx, Midtown Manhattan, Brooklyn, and Queens. Eventually Mexican food businesses rapidly started to grow after the 1980s and Mexican cuisine was gaining interest from the New Yorkers as it be came increasingly popular. Mexican immigrants used to be the only ones that knew how to make certain popular dishes such as tamales, birria, spicy salsa and few other dishes. Birria tacos gained highly increased American consumer demand.

Mexican cuisine in combination with other cultural cuisines was also popular in NYC. In 1981, a restaurant for Tex-Mex cuisine was opened by two Irish individuals in Lower East side in Manhattan near Astor Place. An article was published by the New York Daily News explaining New Yorkers' intensifying cravings for Tex-Mex cuisine.

Later on, the common locations that many immigrants lived in NYC in 2001 were; Sunset Park, Bushwick in Brooklyn; East Harlem in Manhattan; Mott Haven in the Bronx; Port Richmond on Staten Island; Elmhurst, Corona, and Jackson Heights in Queens.

By 2020, the number of Mexican restaurants was around 977 in New York City, Big food chains such as Taco Bell and Chipotle were fast food restaurants that were opened following the popularity of Mexican cuisine.

=== Dishes invented or claimed to have been invented in New York ===
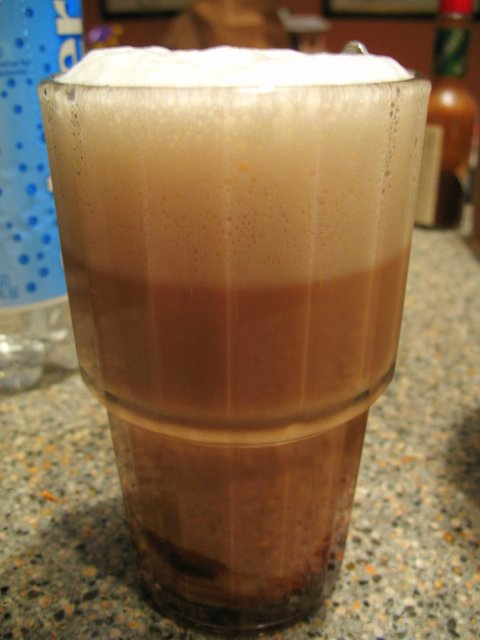
Egg cream

- Baked Alaska
- Beef Negimaki
- Blackout cake
- Chef salad
- Chicken à la King
- Chicken divan
- Cronut
- Delmonico steak
- Egg cream
- Eggs Benedict
- General Tso's chicken
- Ice cream cone
- Lobster Newburg
- Mallomars
- Manhattan
- Manhattan special—a type of carbonated espresso drink.
- Pasta primavera
- Penne alla vodka
- Reuben sandwich
- Sausage and peppers
- Vichyssoise
- Waldorf salad

== Street food ==
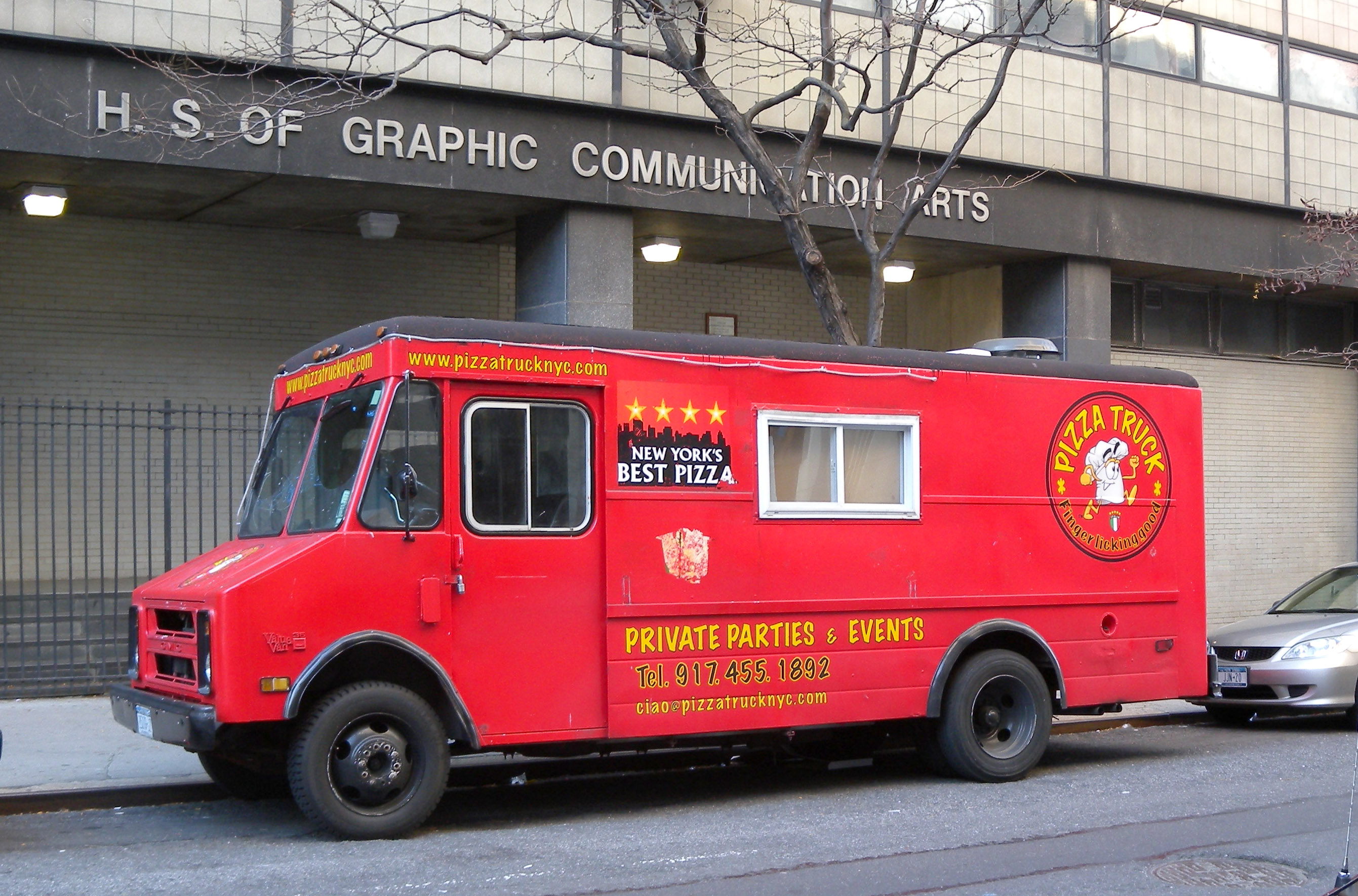
Pizza truck in Midtown

Street vendors have been a part of New York City's economy and culture since the colonial era, when vendors sold food, water, seafood, bread, fruit, vegetables, and household goods in public markets and on city streets. During the 19th and early 20th centuries, waves of immigrants including Jewish, Italian, Lebanese, Greek, and later Eastern European immigrants entered street vending because it required little capital, formal training, or English proficiency. Vendors often worked within their own ethnic communities and sold familiar foods and products to immigrant residents. Pushcart markets became especially common in crowded immigrant neighborhoods such as the Lower East Side and parts of Brooklyn. One of the earliest street foods in New York was oysters, which were cheap, easy to find, and widely sold on the streets during the 1800s.

Modern street vending in New York includes food carts, produce stands, food trucks, hot dog carts, ice cream trucks, and specialty ethnic food vendors. Following immigration reforms in 1965 and 1986, many newer immigrants from Asia, the Caribbean, Central America, and Africa entered the street vending trade. Today, thousands of licensed and unlicensed vendors operate throughout New York City. Street vending remains both an important source of affordable food and employment and a continuing subject of debate regarding public space, traffic congestion, licensing regulations, and competition with brick-and-mortar businesses.

Popular New York City street foods include hot dogs, halal chicken over rice, pizza slices, pretzels, knishes, roasted nuts, falafel, and tacos.

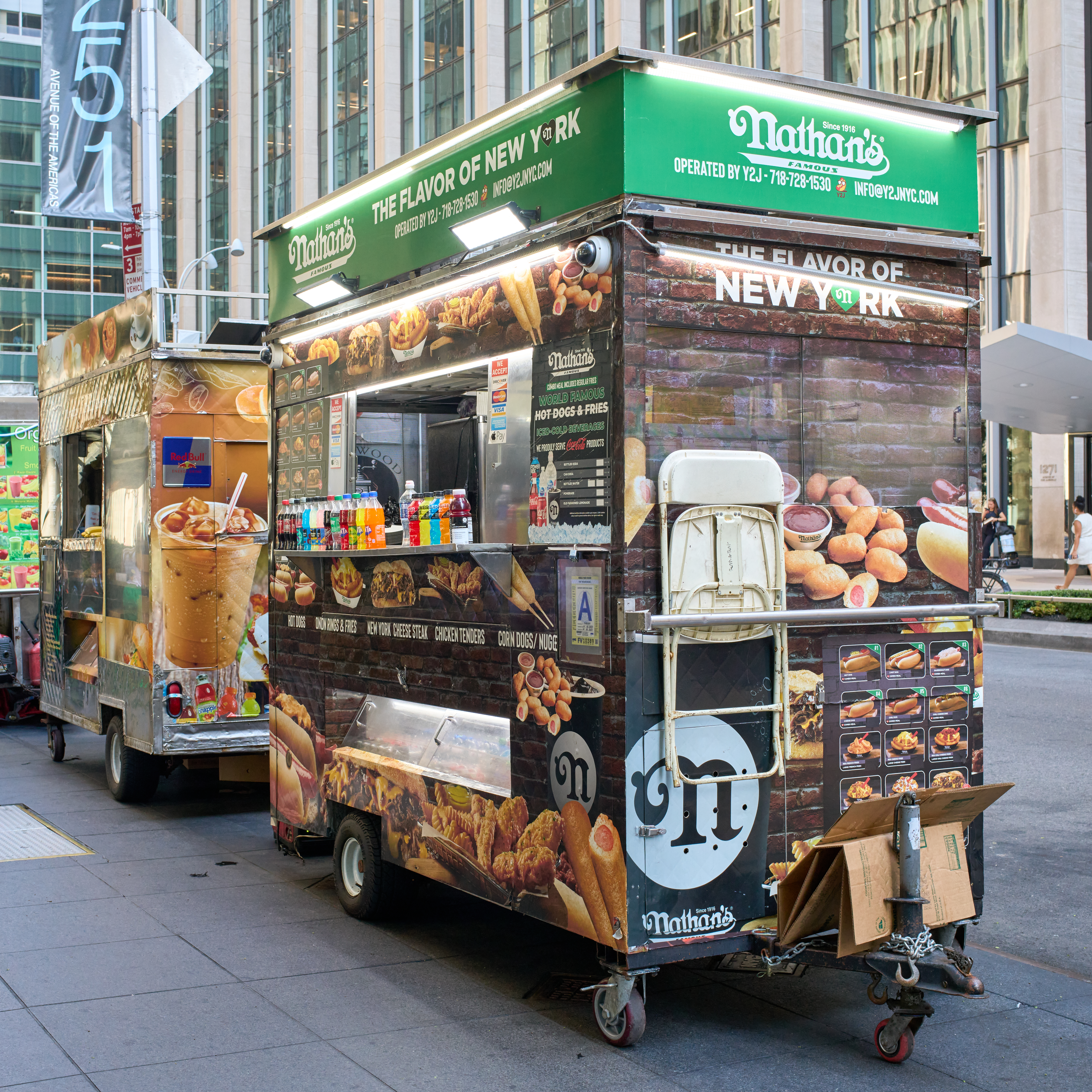
A Nathan's Famous hot dog stand on the corner of W 50th Street and 6th Avenue on the morning of June 18, 2024.

=== Hot dogs ===
The New York hot dog is one of the city's most famous street foods and is usually sold from food carts, food trucks, amusement parks, and stadiums. It is commonly made with an all beef hot dog placed in a plain bun and topped with mustard, onions, sauerkraut, or Sabrett's onion sauce. The classic “dirty water” hot dog cart is still a well known part of New York City culture and often appears in movies and television shows. Famous businesses connected to New York hot dog culture include Nathan's Famous, Papaya King, and Gray's Papaya.

=== Halal Carts ===
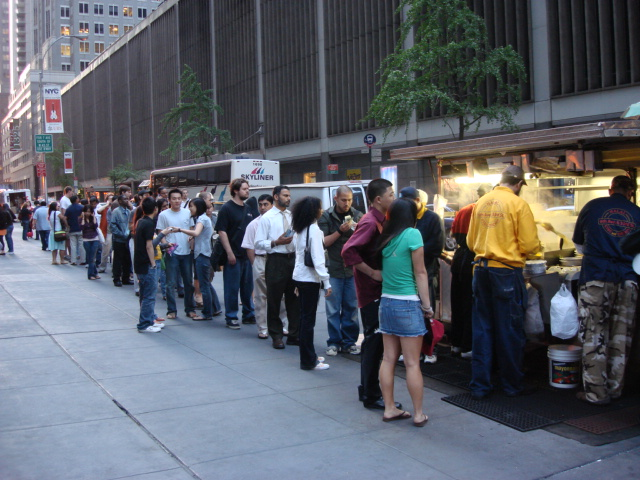
The Halal Guys

Halal carts are one of the most popular parts of New York City street food culture and are known for foods like chicken over rice, gyro, and falafel. Halal food follows Islamic rules about what food is allowed to be eaten, especially how the meat is prepared. Over time halal carts became more connected to New York street food culture and not just religion anymore. Many halal carts are owned and operated by immigrants who bring their own flavors and cooking styles into the food. Different carts have different seasonings and ways of making the food, which makes every cart a little different.

- Grilled chestnuts
- Halal cart chicken/lamb over rice
- Soft pretzels

== Notable food and beverage companies ==
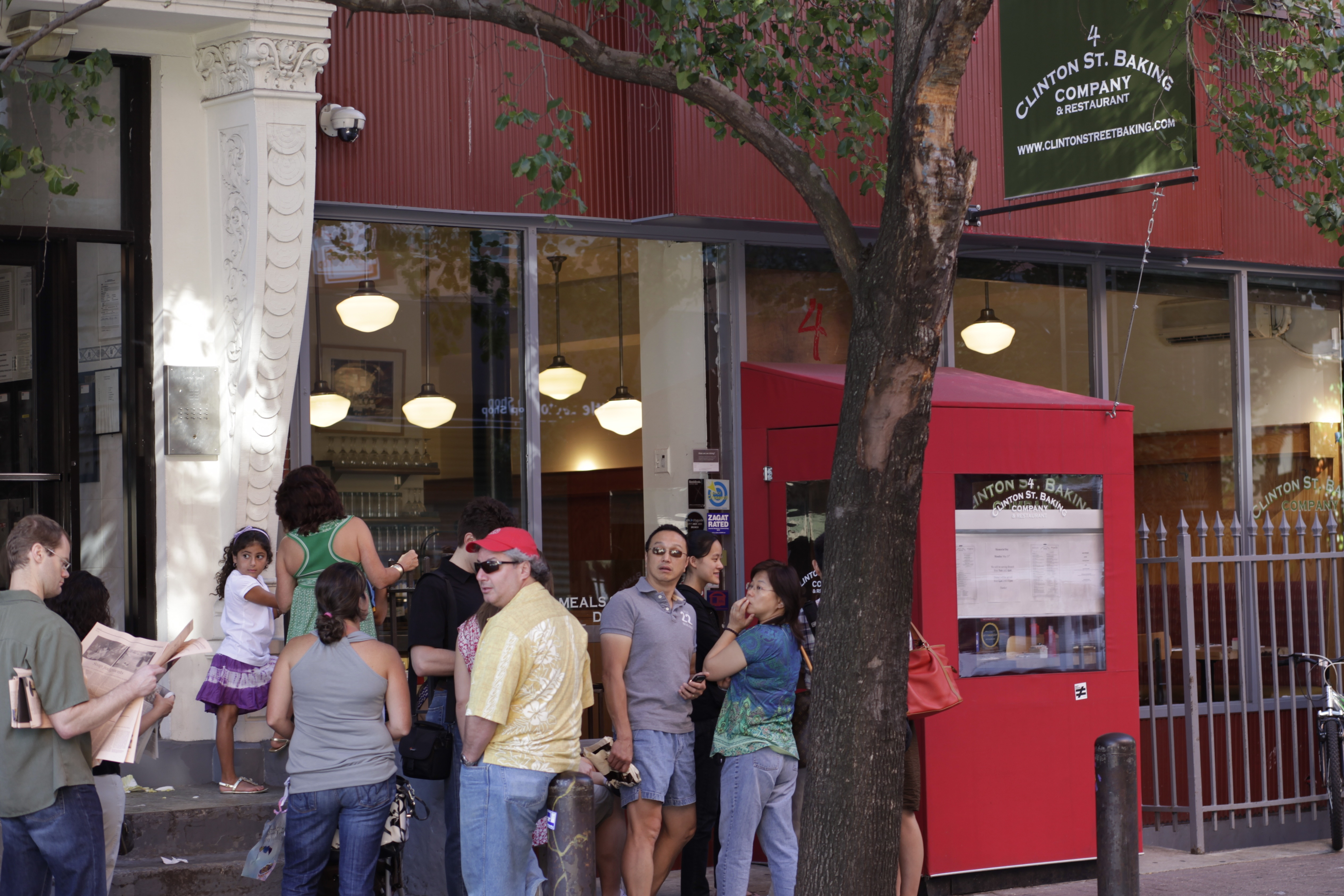
Clinton St. Baking Company & Restaurant

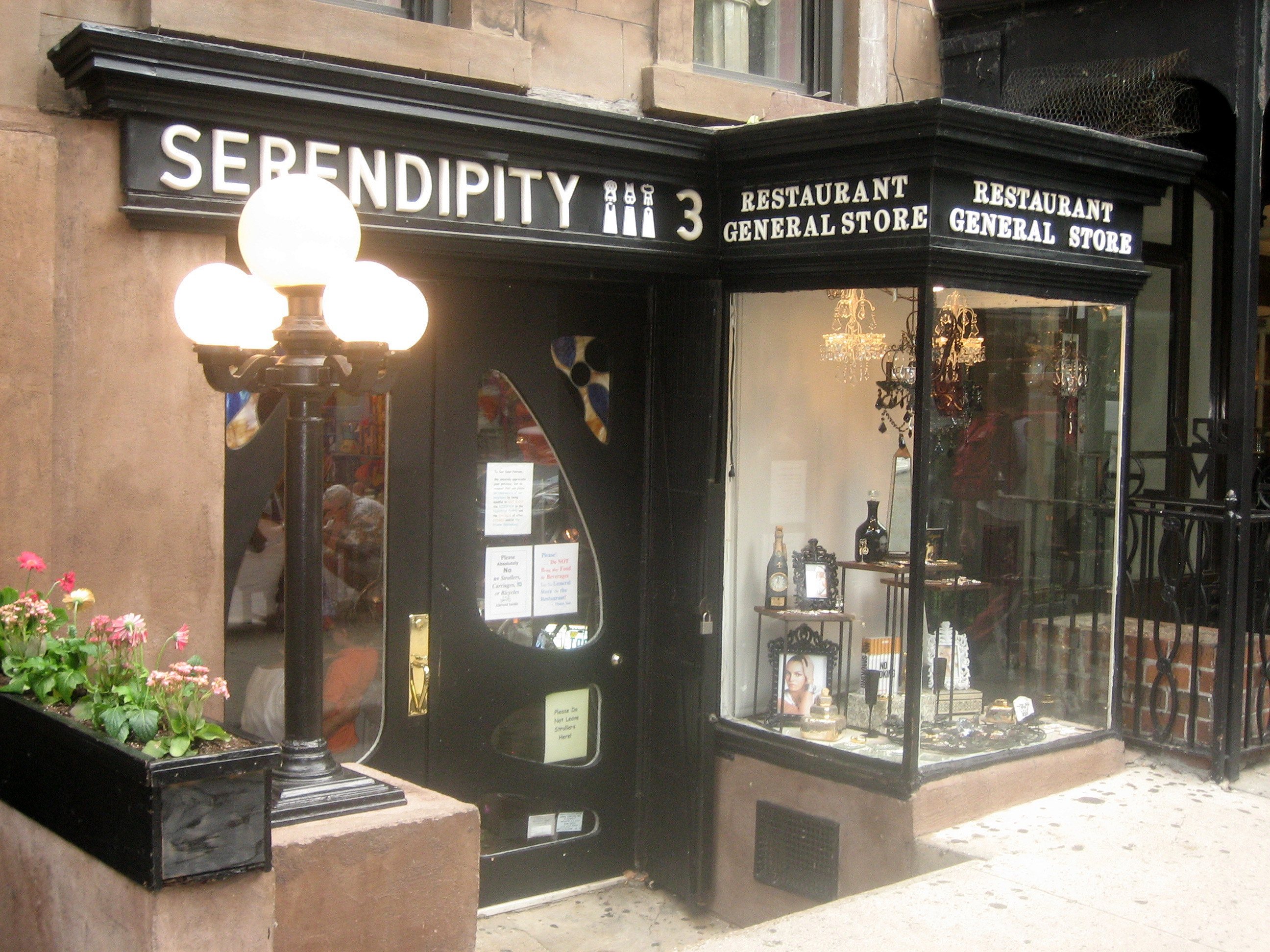
Serendipity 3 is a popular restaurant on the Upper East Side of Manhattan founded by Stephen Bruce in 1954.

- A&P
- AriZona Beverage Company
- Balducci's
- Bamonte's
- Benihana
- Blimpie
- Boars Head Provision Company
- C-Town Supermarkets
- Caffe Reggio – first espresso bar to introduce cappuccino in America
- Carnegie Deli
- Carvel
- Clinton St. Baking Company & Restaurant
- Dean & DeLuca
- Dr. Brown's – sodas
- Drake's Cakes – cakes, pies, pastries
- Domino Foods
- Entenmann's – cakes, pies, pastries
- Fairway Market
- Ferrara Bakery and Cafe – first Italian cafe in America
- Food Network – cable-TV channel
- Fox's U-bet
- Fraunces Tavern – George Washington said goodbye to his troops here. Some departments of his new federal government were originally located here.
- Golden Krust Caribbean Bakery & Grill
- Gray's Papaya – hot dog institution where there is always a "recession special"
- Grimaldi's Pizzeria
- Häagen-Dazs
- The Halal Guys
- Hebrew National
- Junior's – "The World's Most Fabulous Cheesecake"
- Katz's Deli
- Kesté
- Key Food – supermarket
- L&B Spumoni Gardens
- Lindy's
- Lombardi's – first pizzeria in America
- Nathan's
- Now and Later – candy
- Papaya King
- PepsiCo, Inc.
- Peter Luger Steak House
- Ray's Pizza – a fierce debate over which was the original
- Russian Tea Room
- Second Avenue Deli
- Serendipity 3
- Sbarro
- Shake Shack
- Snapple
- Stella D'oro – biscuits, cookies
- T.G.I. Friday's – originally a NYC bar
- Totonno's – first pizzeria in Brooklyn
- Vitamin Water
- Western Beef - supermarket
- Yoo-hoo – chocolate drink
- Zabar's

== See also ==
- List of restaurants in New York City
- List of Michelin-starred restaurants in New York City
- Food system in New York City
- Cuisine of New Jersey
- Regional cuisine
- List of American foods
