= Taco trucks in Los Angeles =

Mobile restaurant in California

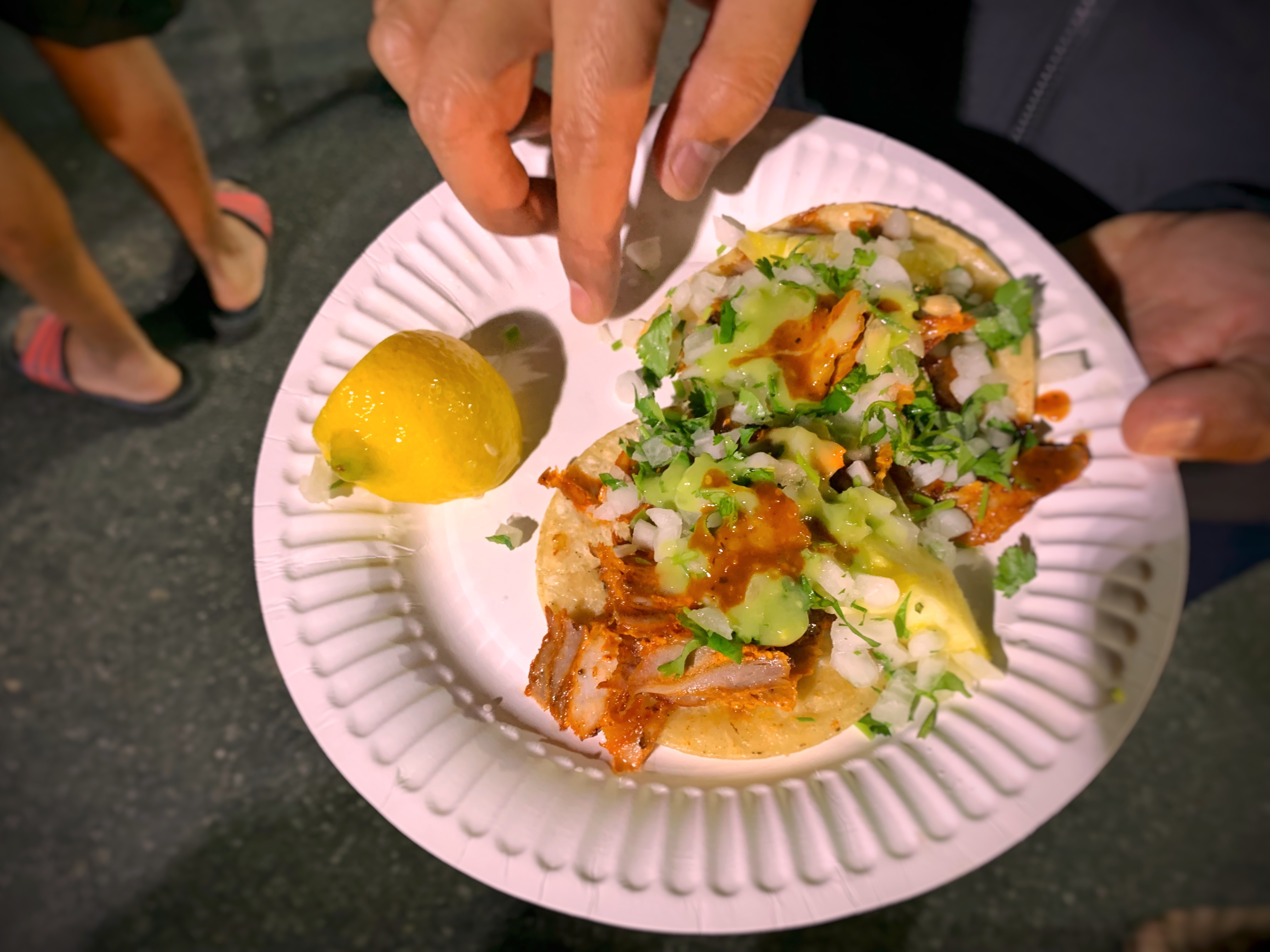
Tacos al pastor at Leo's Taco Truck, Los Angeles, California

Colloquially referred to as Loncheras, Taco trucks have become an iconic symbol of Mexican culture in the United States. Popularized in Los Angeles, Loncheras are often characterized by rough exteriors, bright colors, and bold murals. Operators have been able to build loyal clientele using familiar parking spots, social media, and after-dark hours. Though taco trucks are a staple food for Angelenos of every race, Loncheras in Los Angeles are chiefly owned and operated by Hispanic and Latino families in low to moderate-income areas. Since Raul Martinez's first mobile truck success, taco trucks have continued to serve as windows of opportunity for migrant families and prospective chefs to earn a living. Taco trucks, like all Mexican street food, have allowed Mexican Americans to stay connected to their heritage while adjusting to a new country, community, and way of life. Success among authentic Mexican taco trucks later inspired "fusion taco trucks". Roy Choi's Kogi BBQ food truck, a Korean-Mexican short rib taco truck, is considered to be the first "fusion" taco truck in Los Angeles. The opening of Choi's truck marked a gastronomic explosion on the Los Angeles taco truck horizon. Both regular and fusion taco trucks help meet the high demand for fast, affordable, and convenient street food in the Golden city.

== Historical demand for mobile vending in Los Angeles ==
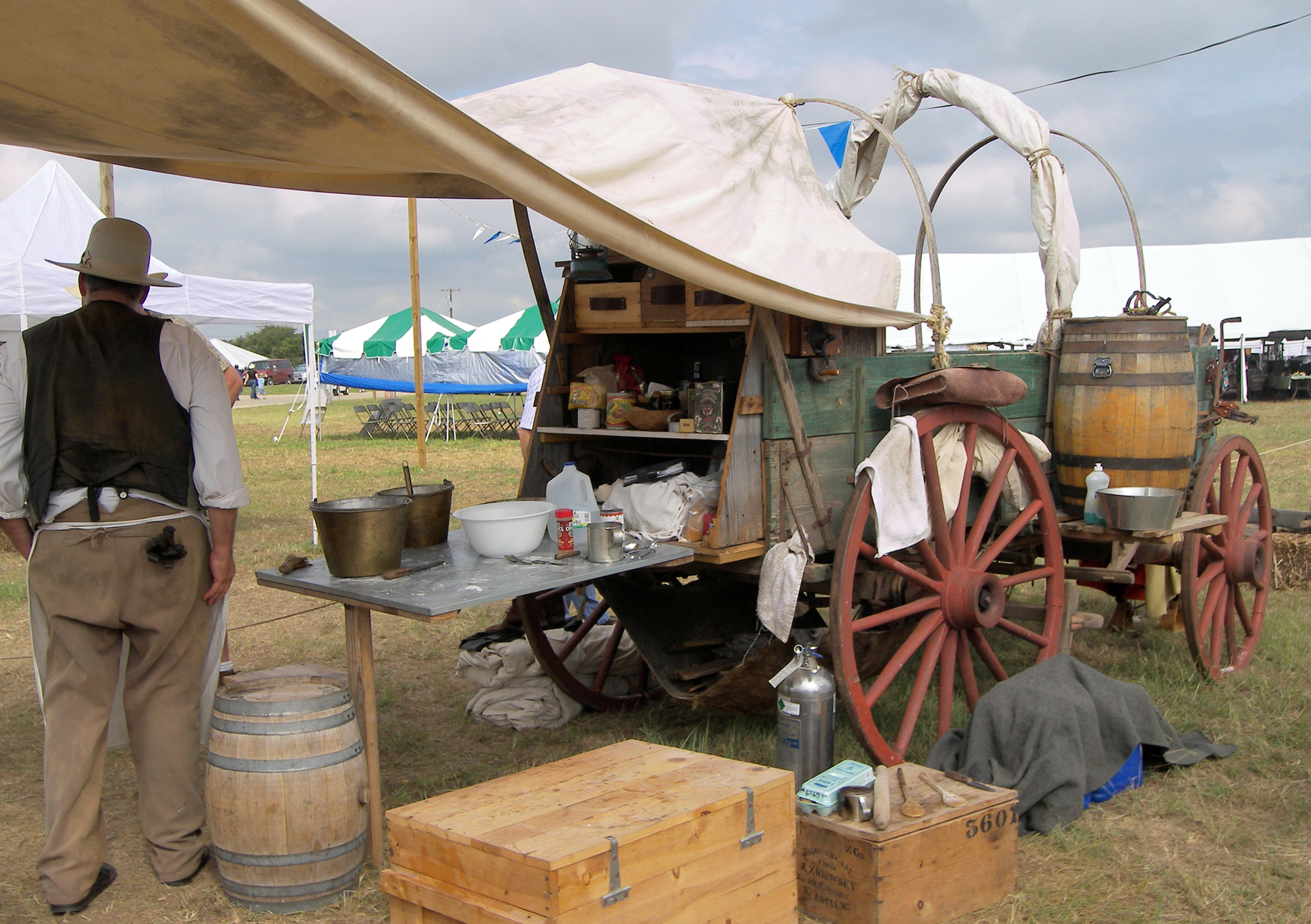
Example of traveling chuckwagons. This photo originates in Texas.

The establishment of the transcontinental railroad in the late 19th century opened the floodgates of migration toward the west coast. Agricultural and economic opportunity spurred millions of migrants toward Los Angeles. Coming from both Mexico and the eastern United States, migrants drove the population of Los Angeles from 50,000 to 1.2 million between 1890 and 1930. Mexican tamale wagons were some of the first to capitalize on the sudden influx in population. These specialized "chuck wagons" were known as Tamaleros. These horse-drawn wagons provided convenient, affordable meals to the growing working class. Chuck wagons commonly followed popular trading routes connecting Mexico, Texas, California, and everywhere in-between. The high population density made Los Angeles a unique hotspot for the jerry-rigged mobile kitchens. In 1901, there was already more than one hundred tamale "chuck wagons" serving tamales to the downtown roads of Los Angeles. Los Angeles media companies often portrayed Mexican street food as dirty, riotous, and uncultured. Mexican street food was blamed for lowering living standards and was seen as competition for white workers in the food industry. Despite the public controversy, and legal efforts to criminalize Tamaleros, they only grew in popularity. At one point in 1903, more than five hundred concerned citizens banded together to protest governmental movements to ban chuck wagons. Each of them signed a document stating, "We claim that the lunch wagons are catering to an appreciative public, and to deprive the people of these convenient eating places would prove a great loss to the many local merchants who sell the wagon proprietors various supplies." Governmental regulations were often unable to keep up with the staggering demand for Mexican street cuisine. According to Gustavo Arellano, tamales were "L.A.’s first street food fad".

Though the popularity of chuck wagon kitchens slowly faded with advancements in technology, the demand for Mexican street food did not. The conditions in which Tamaleros grew to popularity are the same conditions that later spurred the invention of the mobile taco truck. It was not until the late 1900s that motorized taco trucks would rumble their way onto Los Angeles Streets. Tamales, burritos, chili, horchata, and especially tacos, each originally gaining popularity through street food sales, are now staple foods in taco truck menus. Today, many taco truck owners in Los Angeles still face legal issues similar to those of Tamaleros.

== Raul Martinez and the first motorized taco truck ==
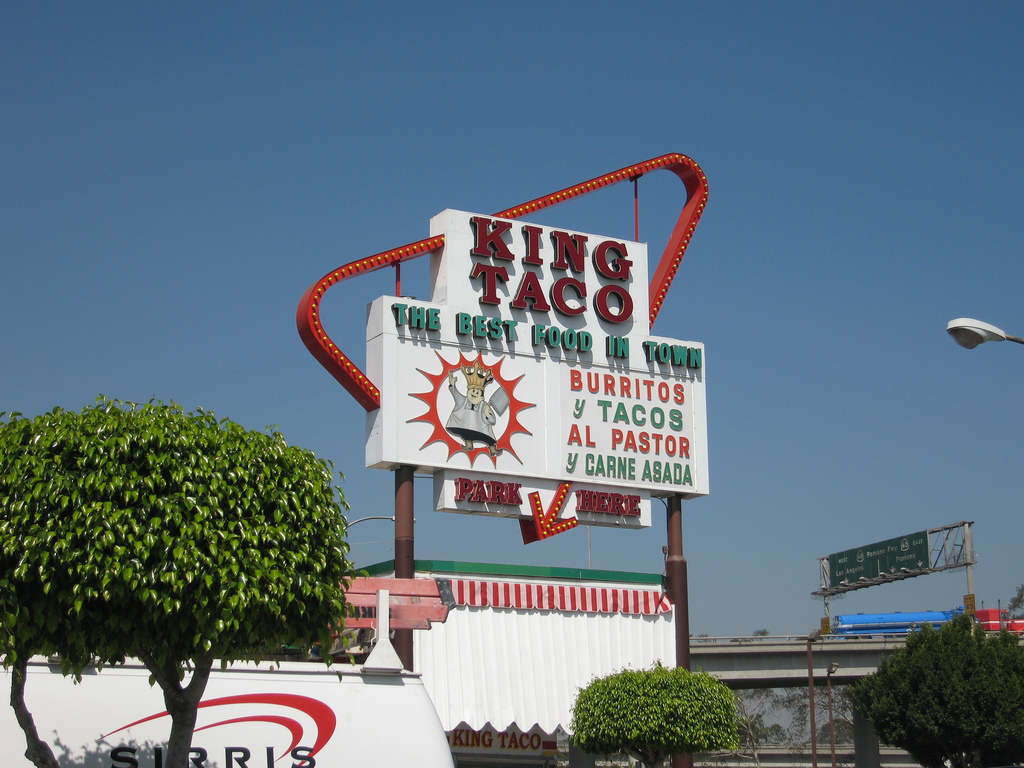
The 3rd Street location is one of the most well-known King Taco Locations. Previously acted as the central kitchen.

Raul Martinez was born in Mexico City, Mexico. Fueled by economic opportunity, Raul and his family left Mexico City and migrated to the United States of America in 1969. Raul settled in the city of Los Angeles where he began working as a dishwasher and later as a butcher. He had previously worked as a traffic cop in Mexico City, but always had a passion for food. Like many Mexican Americans at the time, Raul often struggled to find convenient, genuine Mexican-style food. Raul was determined to take his authentic al pastor tacos to the streets, literally. In 1974, Raul Martinez purchased a 1950s ice cream truck and reworked it into a mobile taco stand. People in his own family told him that he was crazy. Despite the critical feedback, Raul went forward with his plan. The summer of the same year Raul Martinez parked his newly converted taco truck outside a popular bar in east Los Angeles. According to Raul, he earned $70 on the very first night of vending. Profits only increased as the taco truck, nick-named La Guera, grew in popularity among late-night Los Angeles enthusiasts. In 1975, Raul Martinez bought and opened his very first traditional, standing "King Taco" restaurant, in Cypress, California. This location (pictured to the right) is one of the only surviving original King Taco restaurants left in Los Angeles. By 1987, King Taco accumulated nearly $10 million in sales. King Taco now operates 22 free-standing restaurants.

Raul Martinez died on December 3, 2013. His legacy of hard work and charity impacted the east Los Angeles community. To this day, Raul is still known as a "community philanthropist" Upon Martinez's death, a past employee and friend of Raul since the '80s, said "before he came around, nobody used to sell pork tacos [al pastor], so he started to sell that at midnight outside of a bar on Brooklyn, which is now called Cesar Chavez Avenue. We didn’t have food trucks back in the ‘70s -- back when he started” Raul Martinez is commonly recognized for revolutionizing mobile Mexican vending.

Taco trucks rose to prominence in Los Angeles. Today, they affect the modern landscape of Los Angeles food and inspire the taco truck industry all over the United States and the world.

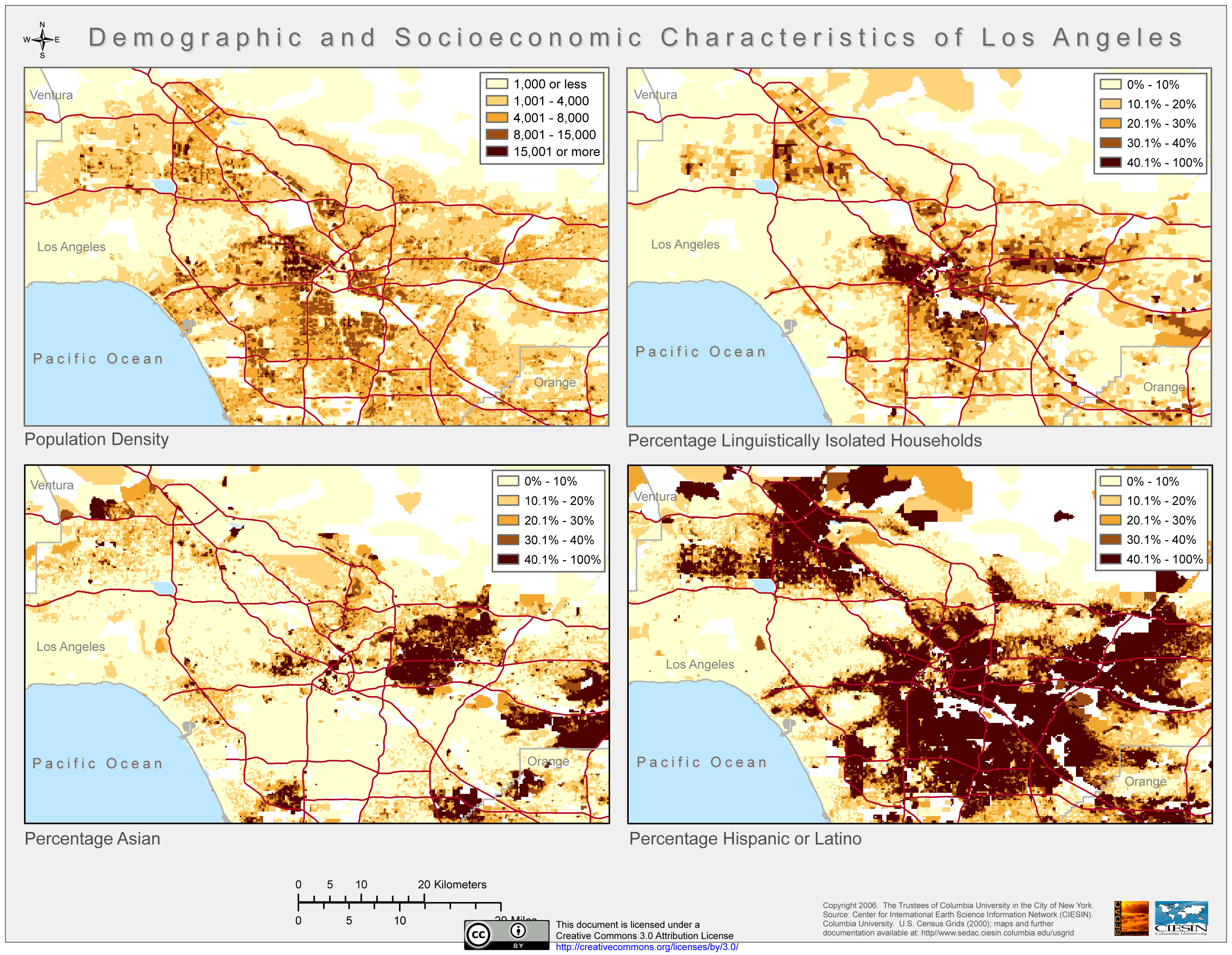
Demographic Mapping of Los Angeles. Percentage of Hispanic/Latino populations in Los Angeles (Bottom Right.)

== Economic implications ==
Taco trucks bridged the gap between Mexican street food and traditional standing restaurants in Los Angeles. Decreasing access to real estate and increasing start-up costs drove many Mexican Americans to turn to taco trucks. Start-up costs for opening a taco truck are much lower than traditional standing restaurants. Opening a taco truck ranges anywhere from $50,000 to $100,000 as compared to brick-and-mortar restaurants which often are $500,000 and up. Profit margins for food trucks are anywhere between 100,000 and 500,000 annually. Lower start-up and operating costs have allowed the taco truck industry to grow consistently since its conception. In 2020, the food truck industry amassed a valuation of 3.93 billion in the United States. The projected valuation for 2028 is 6.63 billion. Though sales are predicted to increase nationwide, taco truck operating costs are rising with inflation. California gas prices are forcing taco trucks in Los Angeles to increase their prices or reduce portion sizes. As of 2021, there are more than four thousand taco trucks in operation within Los Angeles.

The economic opportunities associated with Mexican street food have led to a plethora of multigenerational family businesses within Los Angeles. Because many immigrant families in the United States are limited financially and educationally, many are forced to work low-income and labor-intensive jobs. This remains the case within the city of Los Angeles. Immigrant jobs are often related to retail trade, agriculture, construction, and food industries. Lower access to resources has led to higher percentages of children being expected to work; hence, the multigenerational family businesses. Taco trucks have provided a means of building generational wealth among many Latino families.

== Today ==
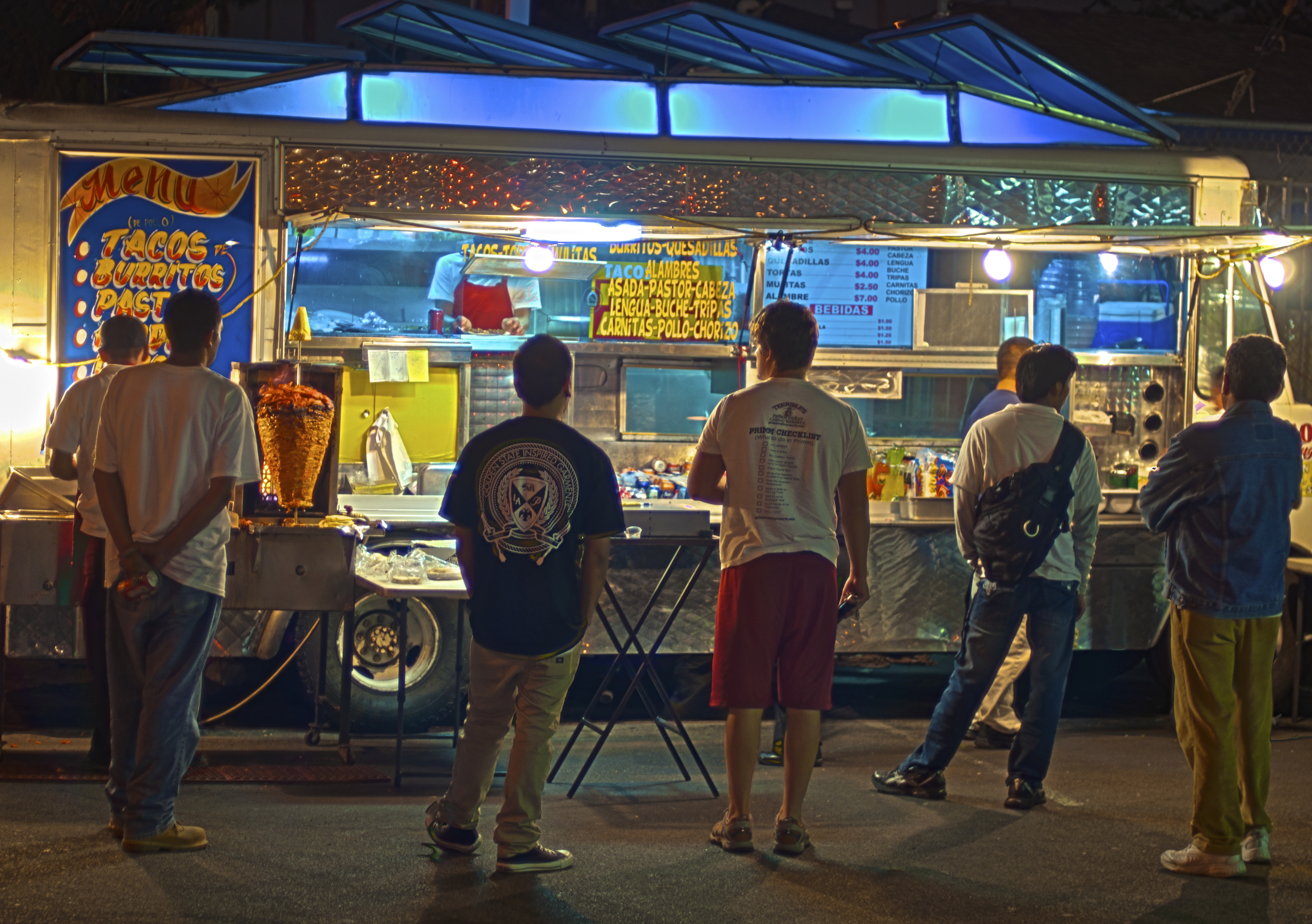
Leo's Taco Truck in Los Angeles, California.

In a 2019 report from Timeout, some of the highest-rated taco trucks in Los Angeles include Mariscos Jaliscos, Leo's Taco Truck, Kogi BBQ, Carnitas El Momo, and Teddy's Red Tacos. Most taco trucks have expanded their food options to include specialty tacos and other common Mexican foods to appeal to more customers. Mariscos Jaliscos features Mexican Mexican-style tacos topped with all different kinds of seafood, their specialty. Leo's Taco Truck offers a selection of customizable Mexican food beyond their traditional tacos, including burritos, tamales, tostadas, Cuban tortas, fresh juice, and horchata. Carnitas El Momo, featured in the Netflix documentary Street Food: USA, has a wide variety of customizable meats and salsas. Teddy's Red Tacos customizes birria tacos, a Mexican style dish native to Jalisco, Mexico. Kogi BBQ, arguably the most popular fusion taco joint in Los Angeles serves their rib tacos from a fleet of Kogi trucks spread throughout the city. Some of these popular taco trucks have permanent parking spots where others continue to publish their movement through the streets on social media platforms. Many of these taco trucks have been able to expand to standing restaurants while still retaining their trucks for catering events.

== See also ==
- Halal cart
- Street vending in Los Angeles
