= Dr. Brown's =

Soft drink brand

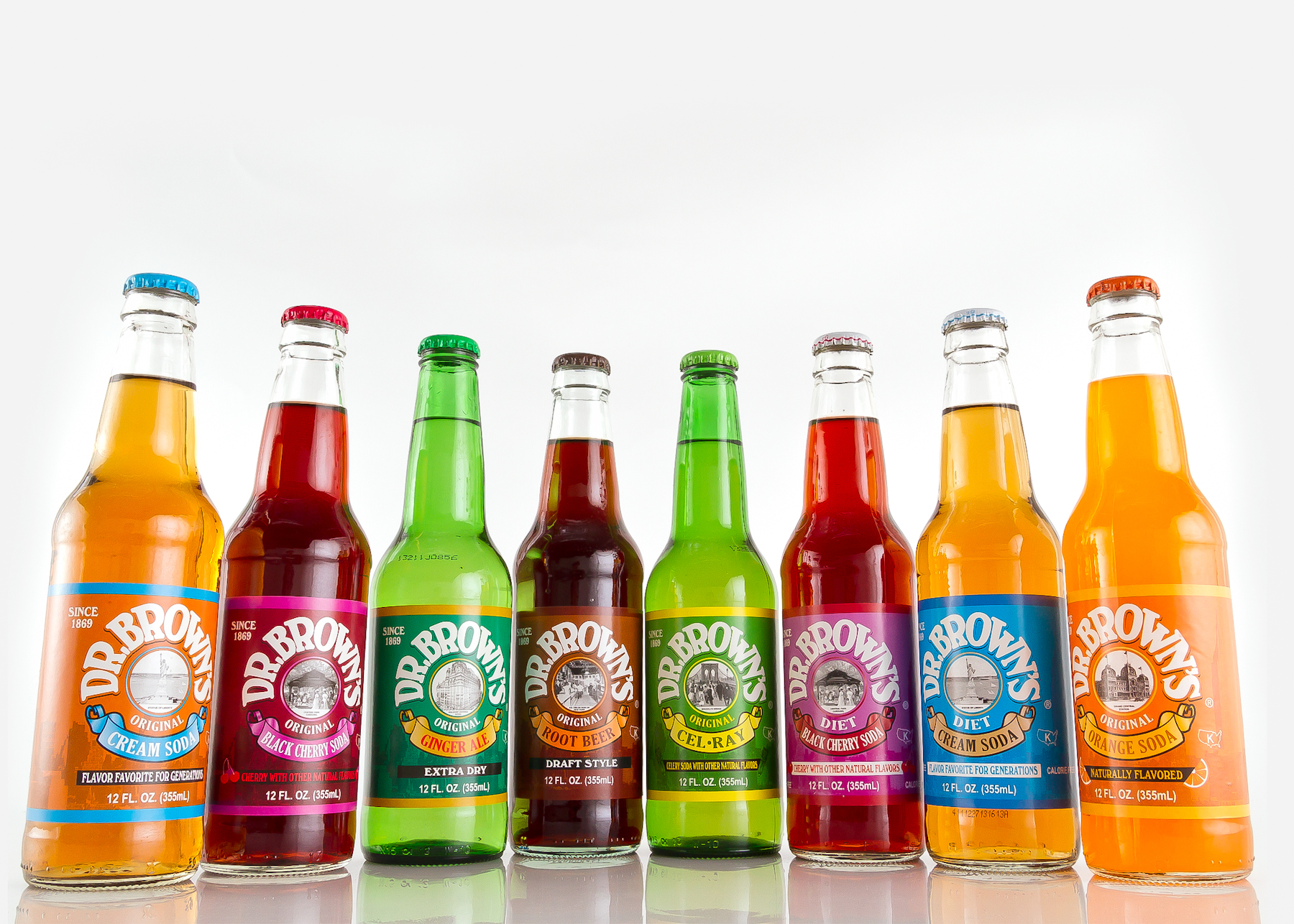
- 12 oz. line for Dr. Brown's soda
- Type: Soda
- Manufacturer: Dr. Brown's Beverage Company, L.P. (The Honickman Companies)
- Origin: New York, United States
- Introduced: 1869
- Website: www.drbrownssoda.com

Dr. Brown's is a brand of soft drink made by Dr. Brown's Beverage Company, L.P. It is popular in the New York City region and South Florida, but it can also be found in Jewish delicatessens and upscale supermarkets around the United States and in English-speaking neighborhoods in Israel. Slogans for the products have included "Imported From the Old Neighborhood" and "Taste of the Town".

Dr. Brown's was created in 1869 and was commonly sold in New York delicatessens and by soda salesmen who sold the product from door to door in Jewish neighborhoods. According to former marketing director, Harry Gold, a New York doctor used celery seeds and sugar to invent the soda and celery tonic now known as Cel-Ray, which was advertised as a "pure beverage for the nerves". However, some have speculated that there may never have been a Dr. Brown and that the name may have been only a marketing invention.

In 1929, the owner of Dr. Brown's merged with the Carl H. Schultz Mineral Water Company and Brownie Chocolate Drink to create the American Beverage Corporation. Canada Dry Bottling Company of New York acquired Dr. Brown's in 1982. Canada Dry Bottling Company of New York was associated with the Honickman companies, who continue to own Dr. Brown's.

In the early 1930s, before Coca-Cola received kosher certification, many Jews drank Cel-Ray soda as well as the other soda flavors that had been created by Dr. Brown's. The labels were designed in the 1970s by Herb Lubalin and features a New York vignette taken from old prints, to emphasize the brand's origins in 1800s New York.

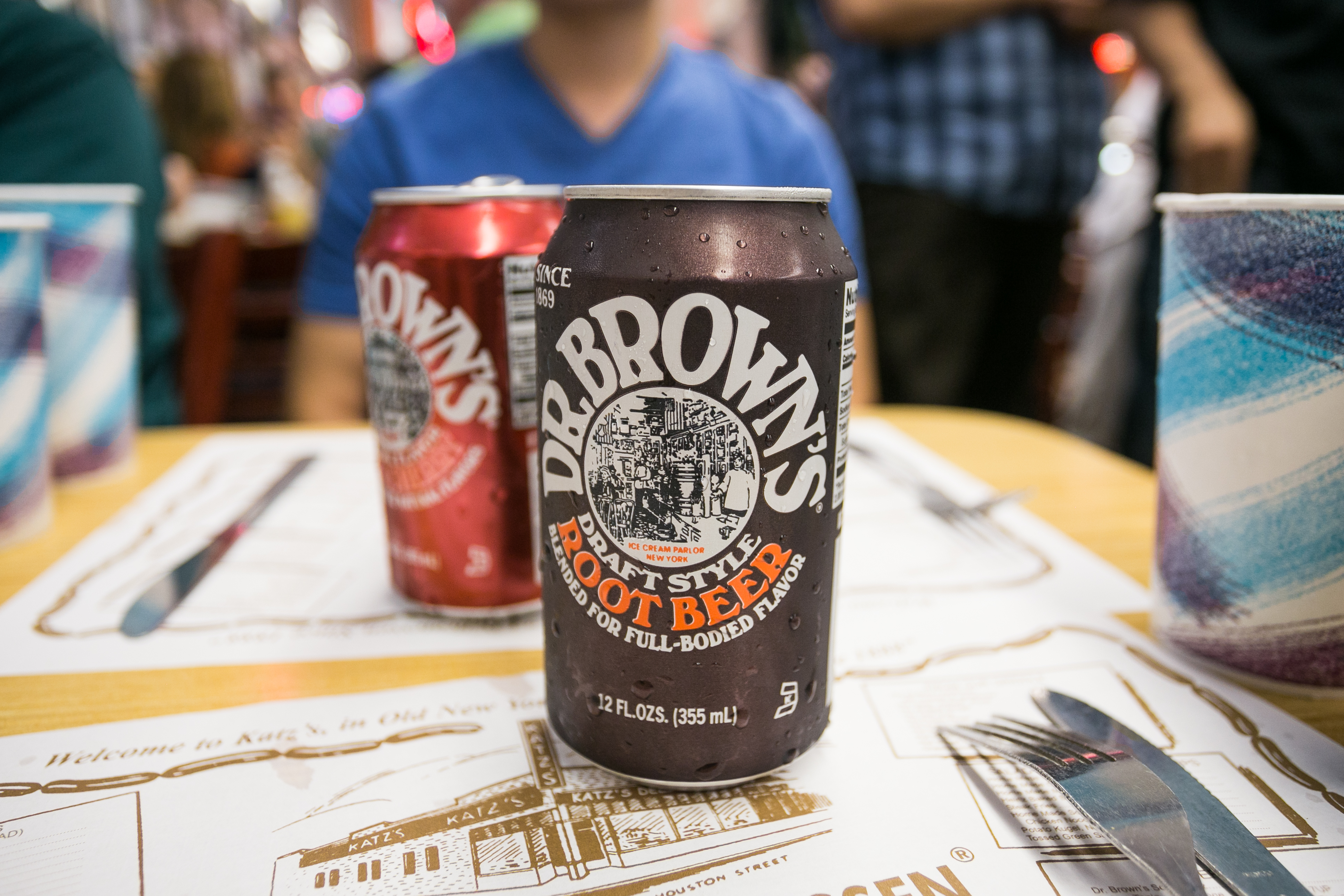
Dr. Brown's soda cans

Dr. Brown's varieties include The Original Cream Soda (regular and diet), Black Cherry soda (regular and diet), Ginger Ale, Root Beer (regular and diet), and Cel-Ray (celery-flavored soda). Former flavors include Cola, Orange, Grape, Tune-Up (Lemon) and Club Soda.

Dr. Brown's soda is typically sold in 12-U.S.-fluid-ounce (355-milliliter) cans and two-liter bottles.

== In popular culture ==
Dr. Brown's soda can be seen in the background of several shots of the 1993 film The Wedding Banquet, most notably during the banquet scene where many of the tables have bottles of Dr. Brown's soda.

== See also ==
- Cuisine of New York City
