= Street vending in Los Angeles =

Bacon-wrapped hot dog vendor in Los Angeles

Street vending has been a part of Los Angeles since the 19th century. Early vendors, many from immigrant communities, sold tamales, fruit, and other foods throughout the city. Today, street vending continues to be common and serves as a source of income for many residents. In recent years, state and local laws have shifted vending from a criminal offense to a regulated permit system. Street vendors operate in various parts of the city, including Olvera Street, Santee Alley, and MacArthur Park.

== Early History ==
Street vending became prominent in Los Angeles during the latter half of the 19th century, after California became a state in 1850. Mexican tamale workers and Chinese pushcart workers were among the first recorded vendors in the 1870s and 1880s. By 1890s, the city introduced rules to limit their movement, although vendors continued to operate due to their popularity.

Most street vendors stayed in downtown LA at first, but as automobiles became more common they were able to spread out into new areas. Tacos from street carts became especially popular in the 1930s.

Chinese immigrants had a harder time because they were forced into segregated neighborhoods, and constant attacks kept their population very small. Many were pushed to move around the city and sell food door to door. Public health officials also told people that their food was unsafe, which hurt their ability to sell. In the 1920s, when Olvera Street was revitalized, Chinese street vending faded away, and Chinatown was moved farther from the city center.

After Olvera Street was redesigned in 1930, most of the street vendors operating there were pushed out. As a result, by the 1932 Olympics, street vending in that area had almost completely disappeared.

== Modern History ==
In 1994, councilman Mike Hernandez took over an initiative to allow street vending in MacArthur Park, Westlake, and Pico Union. Some council members worried that vendors would hurt brick-and-mortar businesses. To ease those concerns, supporters argued that having more people on the streets would help them report crimes to the police.

In 1999, the Institute for Urban Research and Development was put in charge of managing the vending district in MacArthur Park. The program had several problems from the start. Vendors were limited in what they could sell, which made it hard to follow crowds. They were also restricted in what they could sell, so many people chose not to participate.

The movement to legalize street vending grew stronger in the 2000s and 2010s and was heavily led by street vendors themselves. Four major groups formed the Legalize Street Vending Campaign:

- East LA Community Corporation - focused on community development.
- Los Angeles Food Policy Council - looked at vending as a way to improve access to healthy food.
- Public Counsel - provided legal support.
- Leadership for Urban Renewal Network (LURN), now Inclusive Action for the city (IAC) - advocated for low-income communities.

In 2012, the organizations involved in the street vending campaign began meeting with Los Angeles City Council members to build support and draft a policy proposal. The effort gained renewed attention after the 2016 election, as concerns about immigration enforcement grew. The Trump administration's new deportation priorities prompted the City Council to act, and in February 2017 the council voted to decriminalize street vending.

After the 2017 decriminalization and the statewide legalization under SB 946, Los Angeles continued to enforce several "no-vending zones" in high-traffic areas. These included major tourist destinations such as the Hollywood Walk of Fame, where vending had been banned for years, limiting vendors' access to profitable locations.

For decades, street vending has been prominent throughout the history of Los Angeles and has played a significant role in the culture and economic growth of Los Angeles. Considering LA has a large Hispanic population, a large portion of street vendors today and in the past are, or were, of Mexican descent. Today there are over 50,000 different kinds of street vendors in LA; 10,000 of them selling food. It is often the first profession of immigrants in the city.

The street vending micro-enterprises make up a $504 million industry. It has been estimated that over 5,000 jobs have been created by these street vendors and those they deal with.

== Laws ==
In 2016, the city of Los Angeles decriminalized street vending.

In November 2018, the city voted unanimously to legalize it.

In September 2018, California Governor Jerry Brown signed the Safe Sidewalk Vending Act, or SB 946, which decriminalized street vending in throughout the state. SB 946 limits violations and fines imposed on said vendors.

Under these new laws, vendors will be required to have business licenses and health food permits. According to the rules, this is to keep merchants from "impeding with the flow of pedestrian activity" and require them to maintain "a clean area around their carts" according to Councilman Curran Price.

Street vendors are prohibited from vending in specific areas such as the Hollywood Walk of Fame, Universal Studios, El Pueblo de Los Angeles, Staples Center, Dodger Stadium, the Hollywood Bowl, the Coliseum, and Banc of California Stadium on event days.

== Current Issues ==
Street vendors in Los Angeles continue to face challenges despite recent legalization efforts. Many vendors are undocumented, and immigration enforcement continues to affect many vendors. ICE raids have targeted taqueros and other street-food vendors in the city, creating fear and disrupting their ability to work. During the 2025 raids, vendors and business owners reported sharp declines in customers, with some losing more than half of their usual income and closing for extended periods. Advocacy groups noted that vendors are especially vulnerable during immigration sweeps because they must work outdoors and rely on people walking by.

== Historic Street Vending Locations ==
Several areas across Los Angeles have become known for their long histories of street vending. Olvera Street, originally known as Calle de las Vignas, reopened on 1930 as a Mexican-style marketplace. It is located across Alameda Street from Los Angeles Union Station. The street includes eateries, craft shops, museums, and long-standing food vendors that sell churros and taquitos, and other traditional Mexican snacks.

Santee Alley, also known as Los Callejones, is an open-air vendor corridor in Downtown Los Angeles' Fashion District, featuring more than 150 shops and small vendor stalls, along with a number of small restaurants.

The El Salvador Corridor on Vermont Avenue in Koreatown is known for its many Salvadoran vendors. In the market between 11th and 13th streets, vendors sell foods such as pupusas, tamales, atole, and horchata. They also offer items like queso duro viejo, loroco, and a variety of Salvadoran candies.
