= Cel-Ray =

Celery-flavored soft drink

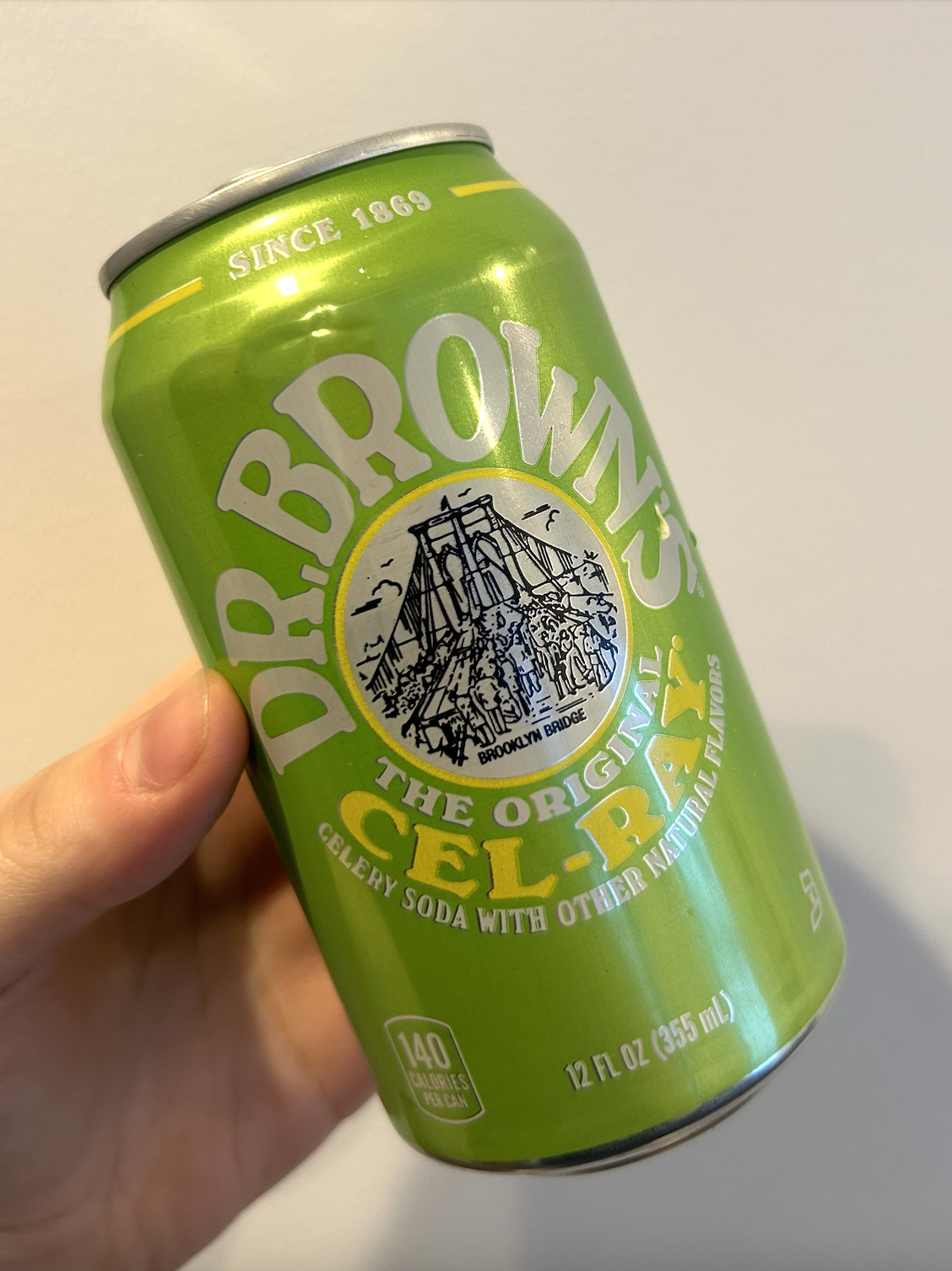
- Type: Soft drink
- Manufacturer: Dr. Brown's
- Distributor: J and R Bottling
- Origin: Brooklyn, New York, U.S.
- Introduced: 1869
- Color: Golden
- Flavor: Celery

Cel-Ray is a celery-flavored soft drink from Dr. Brown's.

== History ==
Dr. Brown's sodas are kosher, are often sold in Jewish delicatessens and restaurants, and can also be found in specialty grocers and grocery stores that specialize in American food in Israel. The flavor, derived from celery seed extract, is reminiscent of ginger ale but with a pronounced celery flavor that is more pungent or peppery than ginger ale.

Dr. Brown's Celery Tonic was, according to the company, first produced in 1868 in Brooklyn, New York. It was served in New York delicatessens starting in 1869 and sold as a bottled soda starting in 1886. The Food and Drug Administration objected to its being called a "tonic", and in the 1900s the name was changed to Dr. Brown's Cel-Ray (soda). Cel-Ray was so popular in the 1930s among New York City's Jewish community that it earned the nickname "Jewish Champagne". Dr. Brown's briefly produced a diet Cel-Ray, but it was discontinued due to low sales. Other "celery tonics"/"celery sodas" were produced in the 1890s, but only Dr. Brown's celery product remains today.

== In popular culture ==
- In the 1954 children's novel Half Magic by Edward Eager, the children are intrigued by the "celery soda" available at their local soda shop.
- The character of Billy Rose (played by James Caan) in the 1975 film Funny Lady habitually drinks celery tonic as an alternative to alcohol.
- In the 1982 film Tootsie, not referred to as "Cel-Ray", rather "celery tonic" as the reason of what was spilled on the video tape and hence why a live performance of that day's show was required.
- In the 1989 novel Weetzie Bat, Weetzie has a "Cel-Ray tonic" with her father while visiting him in New York City
- In the Seinfeld season eight episode "The Pothole", Jerry says that he bruised his lip drinking a Cel-Ray.
- In the book The Amazing Adventures of Kavalier & Clay, Cel-Ray is a favorite drink of Sammy Clay's father, the Molecule Man, or the World's Strongest Jew.
- Cel-Ray is used as a plot point in the web series Emma Approved.
- In the 2004 novel Wake Up, Sir! by Jonathan Ames, Cel-Ray is the favorite drink of the narrator.
- In issue #205 of Knights of the Dinner Table, Gordo asks Rikki to pick up a six pack of Cel-Ray for him.
- In the 2013 novel Bleeding Edge by Thomas Pynchon, Cel-Ray is referred to as "Jewish champagne" and served at "a possibly make-believe Jewish delicatessen, Bagels 'n' Blintzes".
- in History of the World, Part II in Season 1 Episode 3, a vendor offers Stalin a celery soda.
- In season 7, episode 5 of Gilmore Girls, chef Sookie St James says she's "even got Dr. Brown's Cel-Ray soda in the fridge."
- In the 2016 fantasy novel Games Wizards Play by Diane Duane, Nita is introduced to Cel-Ray by a fellow wizard.

== See also ==
- Cuisine of New York City
- Jewish cuisine
- Champagne soda
