= Italian sausage =

Type of pork sausage

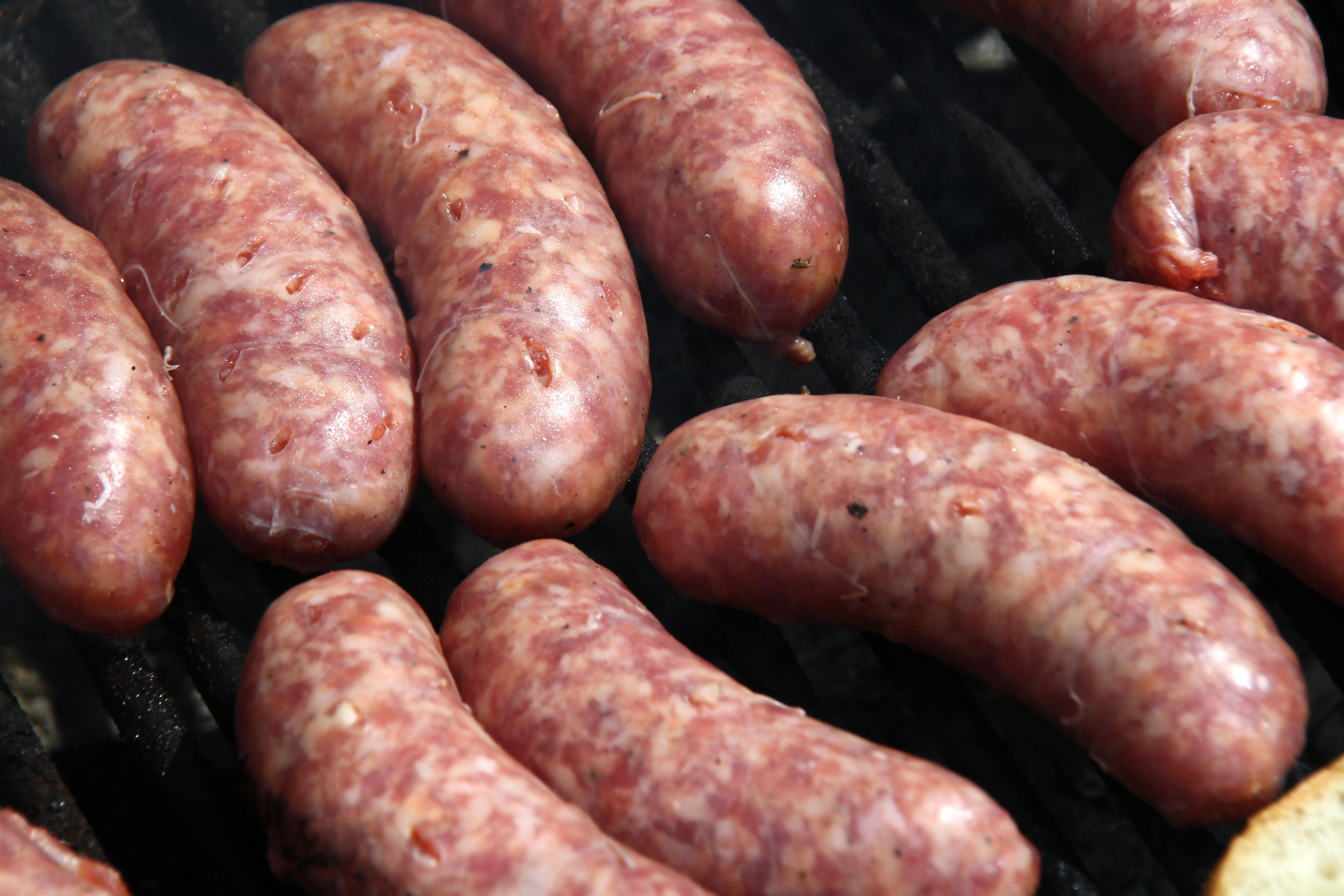
- Type: Sausage
- Place of origin: United States
- Main ingredients: Pork, salt, pepper, garlic
- Ingredients generally used: Paprika, fennel, basil, anise

In North America, Italian sausage most often refers to a style of predominantly pork sausage, often with fennel or anise as the primary seasoning.

In Italy, a wide variety of sausages, very different from the American product, are made.

The most common varieties marketed as "Italian sausage" in supermarkets are hot, sweet, and mild. The main difference between hot and mild is the addition of hot red pepper flakes to the spice mix of the former, while that between mild and sweet is the addition of sweet basil in the latter.

== See also ==
- Sausage and peppers
- Sausage sandwich
