= Halal cart =

Food cart serving halal food

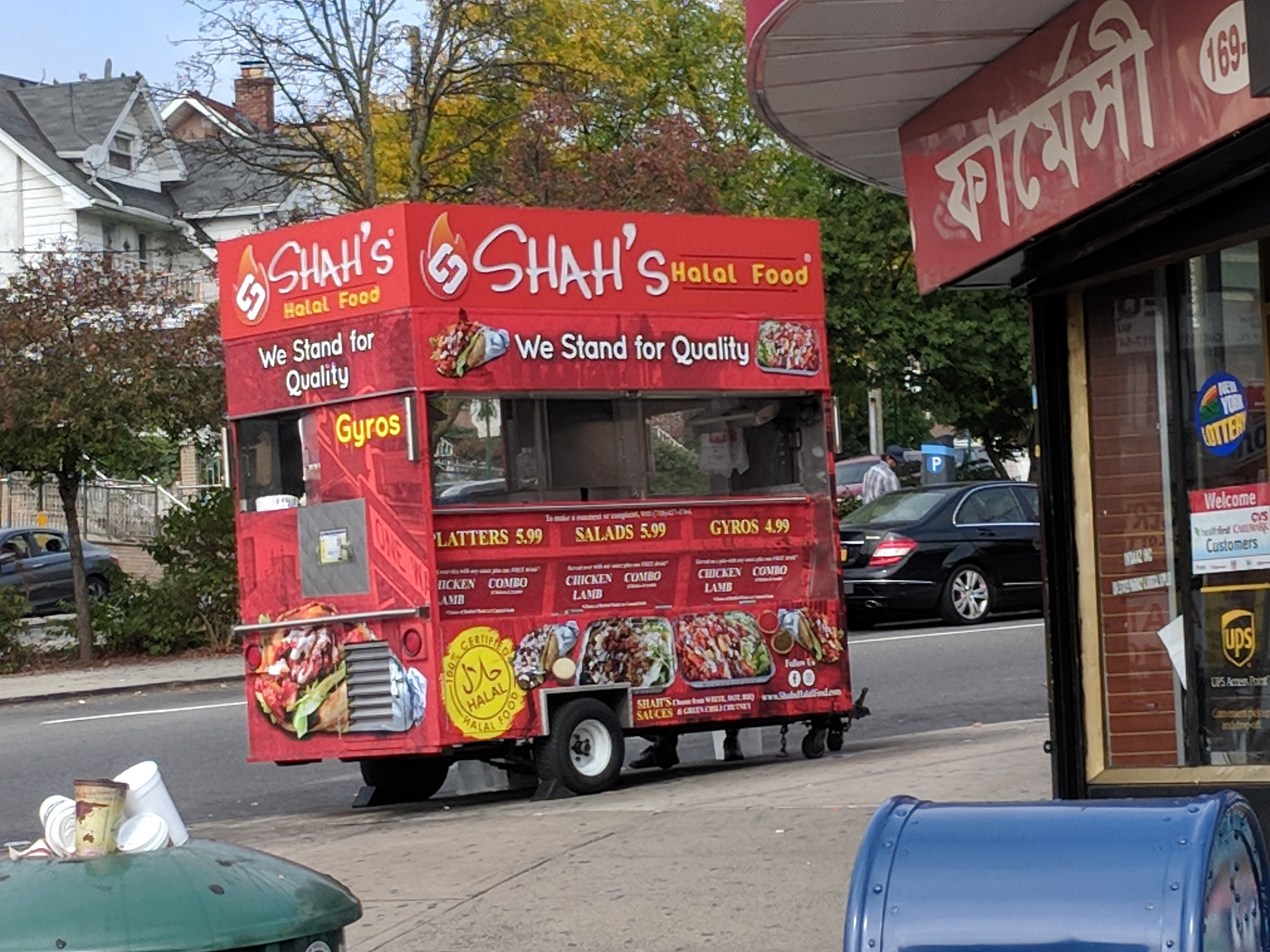
A halal cart in Jamaica, Queens, New York

A halal cart is a food cart which serves primarily halal food, particularly in New York City, but also in other metropolitan areas in the United States. A halal cart platter consists of chicken shawarma or lamb gyro, yellow rice, and salad, with optional red and/or white sauce on top. The red sauce is believed to derive from harissa, while the white sauce may come khyar bi Laban (similar to tzatziki).

The origin of the halal cart is disputed, but The Halal Guys was one of the first, starting off as a hot dog cart in Midtown Manhattan, New York City, before switching to halal food in the 1990s. As early as 2007, halal carts had already begun displacing hot dog carts as the city's dominant form of street food. A Queens College study showed that there were 306 street vendors who immigrated from Germany and Italy to New York City in 1990, and none in 2005; over the same period, those from Egypt, Bangladesh, and Afghanistan had risen from 69 to 563. The ubiquity of halal carts in New York City has been compared to that of Taco trucks in Los Angeles.

== See also ==
- Taco trucks in Los Angeles
