= Sausage and peppers =

Italian-American dish

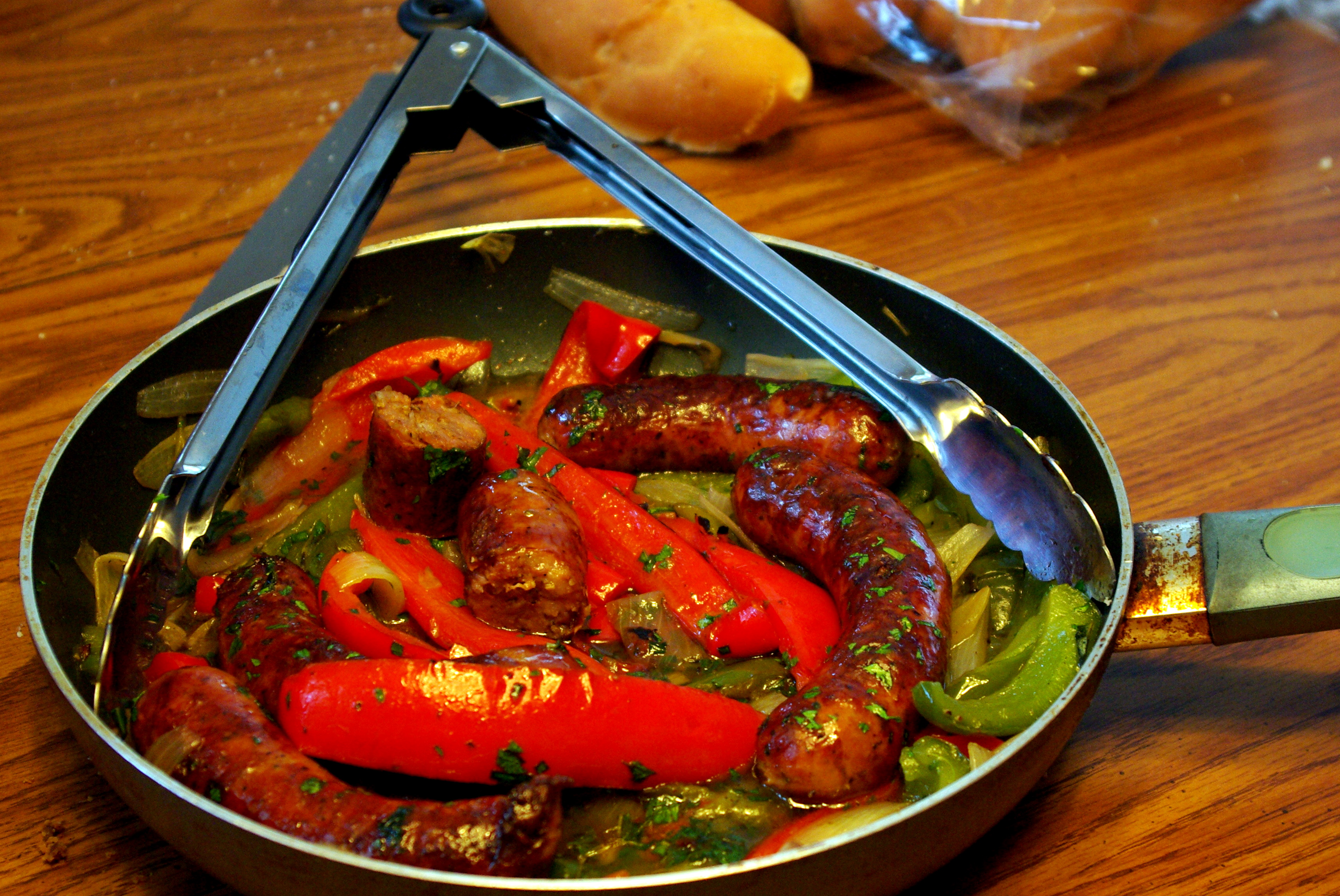
- Sausage and peppers
- Place of origin: United States
- Region or state: New York City
- Main ingredients: Italian sausage, red and green bell peppers, onions (optional)

Sausage and peppers is a dish in Italian-American cuisine prepared using Italian sausage and peppers (such as bell peppers) as primary ingredients. It is served as a dish on its own, sometimes with the use of additional ingredients such as tomato sauce, onions and pasta, and is sometimes served in the form of a sandwich. Some Italian delicatessens in the United States prepare and serve sausage and peppers, and it is a common dish at the Feast of San Gennaro in New York City's Little Italy, where it was first served back in 1926, Italian street festivals, feasts and events in the United States.

== See also ==
- List of sausage dishes
