= Safe Sidewalk Vending Act =

2018 California law

The Safe Sidewalk Vending Act is a 2018 California law decriminalizing street vending and legalizing street vending under certain conditions.

The purpose of SB 946 is to decriminalize and legalize street vending throughout the state.

The proposal defines “sidewalk vendor” as a person who sells merchandise or food from a pushcart, stand, display, pedal-driven cart, wagon, showcase, rack, or other non-motorized conveyance on a sidewalk or pedestrian path. SB 946 states a vendor can be a “roaming sidewalk vendor”, which is someone who moves around to vend, or a “stationary vendor”, someone who just stays in one place to vend. SB 946 applies to charter cities in terms of local authority.

The purpose of SB 946 is to let local law enforcement not fine or regulate street vendors where sidewalk traffic is light and is not infringing upon activity within the area. If local authorities wish to regulate sidewalk vending, they have to be consistent with SB 946. If a city does not have any sidewalk vending legislations and wishes to implement new ones, they also have to be consistent with SB 946. If local authorities have regulations that are consistent with SB 946, no further action is needed. If they have regulations that are not consistent with SB 946, adjustments to these laws will have to be adjusted.

Any sidewalk vending regulations that are adopted or enforced by local authority must follow specific standards

"SB 946 also imposes time, place, and manner restrictions on sidewalk street vending."

A local authority is not required to enforce all or some of these restrictions. If any additional restrictions other than the ones above are to be enforced, it must be directly related to objective health, safety, or welfare concerns.

"SB 946 allows but does not require a permitting program for local sidewalk vendors." These programs must accept specific ID documents in lieu of a social security number. The collected number is confidential.

SB 946 does not limit or affect any state food safety laws, including the California retail food code.

SB 946 does not allow any criminal charges, but may allow administrative fines. A violation of the local authority's vending programs is only punishable by the following fines: $100 for the first violation, $200 for the second violation, and $500 for any additional violation within one year of the first violation. If the local authority requires a vending program, the authorities can impose higher fines for vending without a permit: $250 for the first violation, $500 for the second violation, and $1000 for any additional violation within one year of the first violation. On the fourth and any subsequent violation, the local authority can rescind a permit.

SB 946 applies to any pending criminal charges or vindicates any prior convictions.

== Analysis ==
SB 946 came on the heels of the Trump administration prioritizing illegal immigrants with a record for deportation. Officials in California saw it as imperative to protect vulnerable sidewalk vendors. Prior to the adoption of SB 946, the police could cite or arrest unlicensed vendors or seize their carts. State lawmakers were guided by the principle that minor contact with the police that might lead to fines or limited time in jail should not lead to deportation.

Sidewalk vending in California is an immigrant-dominated industry. Analysts characterize the movement to decriminalize sidewalk vending in Los Angeles as "grounded in a specific vision of racial justice." Decriminalization of sidewalk vending in California grew out of the "sanctuary" movement in California.

== Impacts ==
The passage of SB946 has caused cities and counties to pass new legislation for regulating sidewalk vending. Cities and counties have responded to escalation in unpermitted sidewalk vending that followed the adoption of SB 946 by launching public awareness campaigns and developing task forces to tackle unpermitted sidewalk vending.

According to the office of a district supervisor in the County of Santa Barbara's Board of Supervisors, while SB 946 is a safeguard for some individuals in the wake of federal immigration efforts, it has also made it difficult for cities and counties to enforce regulations on sidewalk vending.

Following the adoption of SB 946, the city of Anaheim experienced a significant increase in unpermitted sidewalk vending. Anaheim city staff concluded that unpermitted sidewalk vending on has impacted public health, safety, and welfare because of lack of proper food handling and storage; obstruction of public right of ways; unsafe pedestrian congestion on sidewalks; accumulation of trash and debris on sidewalks and storm drains; grease and residue on sidewalks resulting in potential slip and fall incidents; disposal of oils and grease in storm drains; and aggressive behavior and resistance to enforcement by the vendors.

According to the City of Ventura's Interim City Attorney, illegal vendors operating in public rights-of-way have caused numerous complaints from businessowners and members of the public. He concluded that vendors acting without oversight threaten the public welfare. He noted that SB 946 sharply regulates the type and severity of penalties a California municipality may enact in order to police illegal sidewalk vending.

Along a 10-block stretch of Mission Street, a thriving illicit market formed, where sidewalk vendors sell cheap stolen items. In 2023, a San Francisco district supervisor issued a 90-day ban on sidewalk vending on Mission Street after Public Works inspectors tasked with regulating them were subjected to violent threats.

Observers blame the illegal vendors for undermining brick-and-mortar small businesses. In one case, in the city of Mission Viejo, Orange County, an unauthorized food vendor set up in front of a restaurant serving similar fare. The brick-and-mortar restaurant owner communicated to municipal officials about adverse impacts to its sales during evenings, leading to reduced working hours for restaurant staff. In San Francisco, the city's first permitted food vendor stated that he had to close his business due to SB 946. A manager of restaurants in Santa Maria expressed that unpermitted sidewalk vending is causing businesses to go out of business. In Los Angeles County's Castaic region, a long-time 7-Eleven franchisee concluded that vendors were hurting his business. Another franchisee expressed that people sell food on the land he rents without paying.

SB 946 and other state laws have been blamed for creating situations in San Francisco where licensed businesses compete with thieves. The conditions that some illegal vendors work in have been likened to indentured servitude. In San Francisco, observers note that SB 946 and other state laws have made it difficult for the city to enforce its own rules.

California Senator Scott Wiener noted that that SB 946 did not foresee "the rise of selling stolen goods on the streets, which has been a growing problem in San Francisco, and so it limits the ability of our police." He introduced Senate Bill 276 in 2025 that will allow police in San Francisco to issue a misdemeanor citation to someone selling commonly stolen goods without a permit and without receipts proving that he paid for it.

== Controversy ==
=== Vendor Cooperation ===
While the intent of SB 946 is to aid in the “important entrepreneurship and economic development opportunities” street vending may bring to low-income and immigrant communities, the inability to prosecute vendors with criminal charges has led to issues surrounding vendor cooperation. Despite the passing of city ordinances that require vendors to receive permits and follow certain regulations, some vendors “have chosen to ignore these regulations and bypass the permitting program”. A lack of vendor cooperation has led some cities to create stricter ordinances in hopes of gaining compliance through larger fines, relocations, or confiscation of “stalls and wares”.

=== Health Permit ===
In many California cities, the permitting process required of vendors may also include receiving a food handler health permit, a document certifying the safe preparation of food by vendors. Outdated state retail food code however has caused issues for vendors seeking to comply with these regulations. In an effort to solve this issue, Senate Bill 972 was passed by the California Senate in order to update the food code to simplify the requirements for street vendors. Specifically, the bill introduces street vending into the food code and limits the equipment requirements originally established for food trucks.

=== Opposition ===
The League of California Cities, which has a membership of 476 out of 482 of California's cities, opposed the adoption of SB 946. It argued that the bill went too far in restricting a local jurisdiction's ability to regulate sidewalk vending. It noted that jurisdictions regularly designate areas for specific use, such as for medical facilities and office buildings. The bill's limiting of penalties for violations of regulations on sidewalk vending to administrative fines was criticized as being an inadequate deterrent to unlawful activity.

=== Criticism ===
According to Ventura Assistant City Attorney Christopher de la Vega, "SB 946 severely curtailed cities ability to penalize sidewalk vending. ...The only penalty the city may impose is a series of increasing fines. … Imagine if California decriminalized driving without a driver's license. This is a comparable situation.”

A councilmember of Beverly Hill's City Council characterized SB 946 as a "stupid law". The city's Vice Mayor accused Sacramento of engaging in overreach over local affairs.

On San Francisco's Mission Street, the neighborhood has become a prominent spot for people selling stolen goods. Officials blamed this activity on SB 946 because of how it limits penalties for unpermitted sidewalk vending to administrative fines.

The Santa Ana City Council adopted a resolution blaming state laws for a rise in unpermitted sidewalk vendors selling unsafe food, blocking sidewalks, and undermining public health and safety. Officials in Santa Ana voiced concern that vendors from elsewhere came into the city to establish taco stands on sidewalks under large red umbrellas, taking over large sections of sidewalks, using heating equipment with open flames, and leaving behind grease residue.

A councilmember in Santa Monica's City Council stated that SB 946 has made it more difficult to hold people accountable for violating regulations on sidewalk vending. Because SB 946 prevents criminal penalties for violations of laws around sidewalk vending, vendors choose to ignore those laws. Although vendors can be issued administrative fines for violations, they cannot be compelled to show identification documents when they are cited and can get relief based on their ability to pay. An advocate for California's industry concluded, "What we’re seeing with S.B. 946 is there’s really just no incentive on either side for people to get permitted or for law enforcement to go after unpermitted people."
