= Western Beef =

American supermarket chain

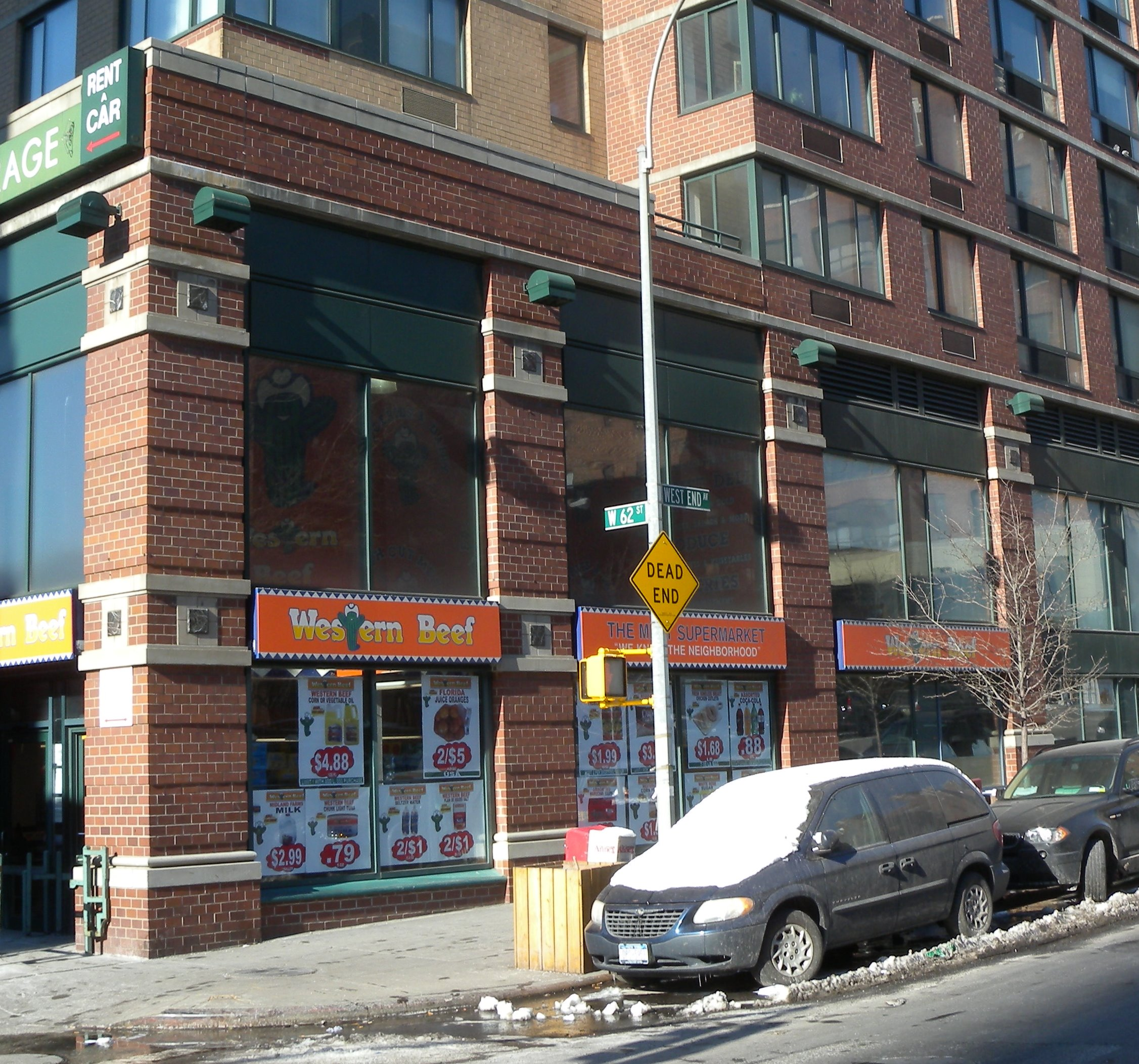
- Upper West Side store
- Industry: Supermarket
- Headquarters: Ridgewood, Queens, United States
- Area served: Tri-State Area, Boca Raton
- Key people: CEO Peter Castellana III, Corporate Controller Andrew Castellana
- Brands: Delicioso, Farm Fresh, Blu, Chicks, 1906 Butcher Shop, Soley
- Services: Brand Development, Wholesale, Sourcing, Buying, Grocery Home Delivery, Retail, Wholesale
- Website: www.westernbeef.com

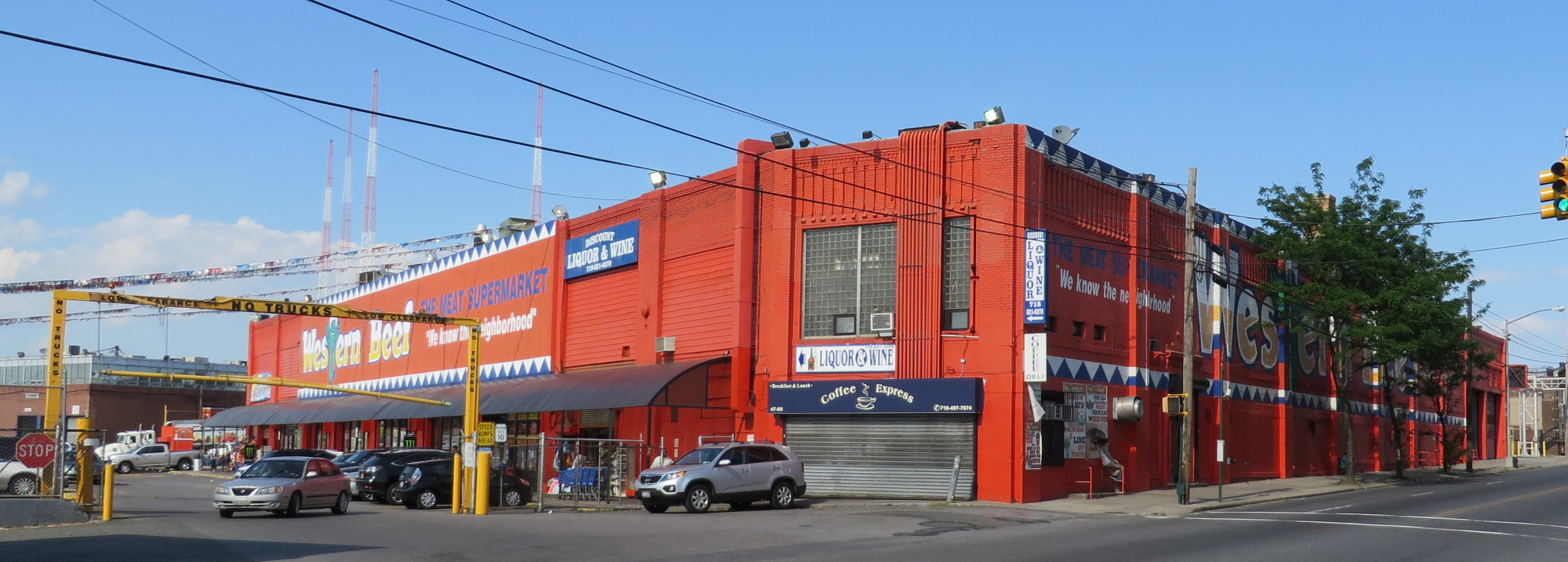
Ridgewood, Queens

Western Beef is a low-budget supermarket chain located mostly in the New York City metropolitan area. The retail company is a subsidiary of Cactus Holdings Inc.

In June 2018, the chain owned and operated 27 stores located in the Tri-State Area, Lake Worth (Florida), and Boca Raton (Florida). By 2026, the company ran 19 locations; in October 2026, 14 of them were sold to Food Bazaar, which rebranded the stores. Five stores remain owned and branded as Western Beef as of November 2026.

== History ==
At the time of its expansion in 1989, the company seemed to be thriving. However, in 1996, Western Beef executives revealed that their business had been adversely affected by supposed ties with the Mafia. The proprietor, Peter Castellana Jr., admitted that he had dismissed his father from the firm because of the latter's association with organized crime. Having overcome the commercial problems, Castellana Jr, and his brothers stated that they preferred to run the business cleanly and legally. Castellana Jr, was quoted as saying, "I'm not in the Mafia, so I don't get any of the benefits of being in the Mafia, but everybody thinks badly of me because they think I'm in the Mafia anyway."

== Business model ==
Western Beef's business model has been to operate in ethnically diverse, inner city neighborhoods that have been abandoned by other supermarket chains. Many of Western Beef's stores lie within economically distressed census tracts that were deemed as Qualified Opportunity Zones by New York state's Empire State Development as part of Tax Cuts and Jobs Act of 2017 and Western Beef has publicly stated its support for the program in creating strong jobs and economic development that supports these communities. The chain has been described as, "A pre-Costco discount retailer, Western Beef offers steep savings on large-quantity purchases, including sides of beef, vats of cranberry juice, and cases of paper goods. What the massive, 20,000-square-foot-plus stores lack in charm, they deliver in sheer volume and savvy neighborhood demographics; store-brand, mass-market and some imported groceries are on hand, along with specialty items like yuca and yampee, appio and ajicito." The supermarket has recently started its grocery home delivery service, Western Beef Direct, providing customers the ability to order their groceries online. Its motto is "We know the neighborhood". Its logo is the words "Western Beef" with a cactus wearing a cowboy hat in place of the "t" in "Western".

The CEO of Western Beef is Peter Castellana III. Charitable efforts and civic engagement are done through The Castellana Foundation and Western Beef Neighborhoods, a volunteering and donation program. The Castellana Foundation has donated over US$10 million to date and many hours of volunteering. The charity entities concentrate its efforts in the Bronx during the coming years. On October 3, 2018, Western Beef partnered with Senator Joe Addabbo to provide goods for Glendale, New York's Sacred Heart Food Pantry. In April 2019, The Castellana Foundation announced it had donated enough for the building of multiple houses in Guatemala and the Dominican Republic. The organization has a special connection to the project and the countries given that so many of Western Beef's customers come from these countries.

The company also operates five Junior's Food Outlet stores: four in Brooklyn, and one in Queens.

Western Beef, through its food branding company, Millennium Food Group, has several store brands, including the Western Beef Brand, Delicioso (Hispanic heritage brand), and Farm Fresh grocery staples, Chicks chicken products and Blu water products.

During the 2000s, Western Beef moved out of its traditional home in the meatpacking district, when its premises were sold because of changes in the neighborhood demographic.

Western Beef recently signed a lease in Jamaica, Queens to expand its retail footprint as a part of a deal with Omni New York for a mixed-use project around $170M. Western Beef will own the first two floors and the parking lot.

In April 2019, Western Beef's parent company, Cactus Holdings, was included in The Real Deal's "top 10 biggest real estate projects coming to NYC" with 4720 3rd Avenue in the neighborhood of Belmont in the Bronx. The location will offer a Western Beef supermarket in addition to other commercial space and 159 residential units.

In April 2019, Western Beef launched its partnership with grocery ecommerce provider, Instacart, providing online grocery delivery in South Florida, and the tri-state area, including every borough in New York City.

Most of Western Beef's stores (14 out of 19) were sold to Food Bazaar in October 2026.
