= New York–style pizza =

Large hand-tossed thin crust pizza

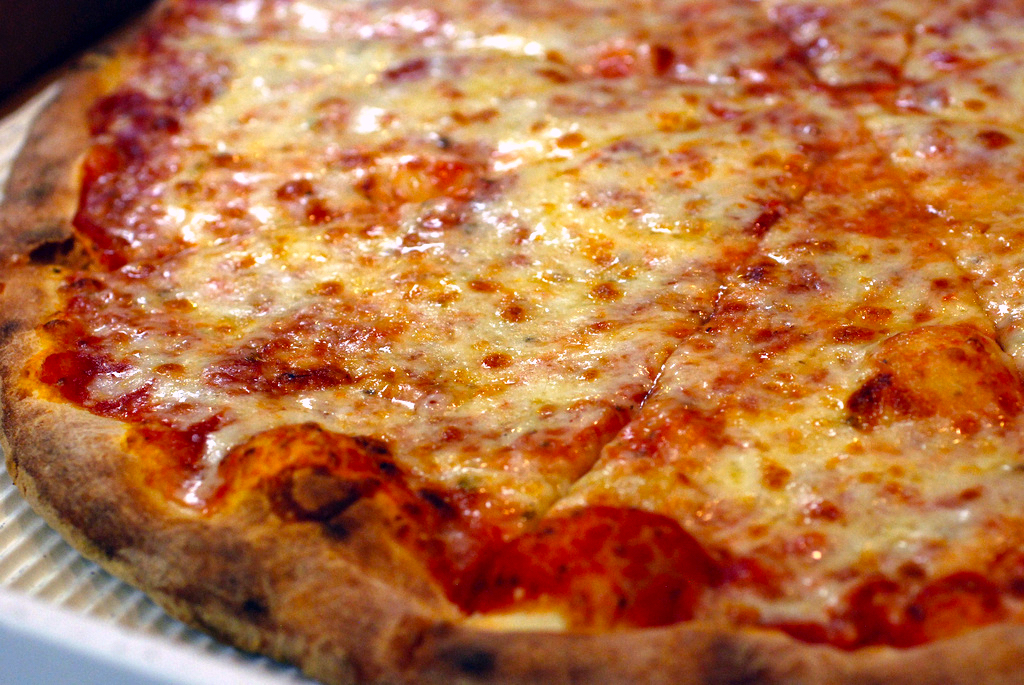
- Type: Pizza
- Place of origin: United States
- Region or state: New York City, New York
- Main ingredients: Pizza dough, tomato sauce, mozzarella

New York–style pizza is a pizza made with a large hand-tossed thin crust, often sold in wide slices to go. The crust is thick and crisp only along its edge, yet soft, thin, and pliable enough beneath its toppings to be folded to eat. Traditional toppings are simply tomato sauce and shredded mozzarella cheese. This was a popular meal among poor Italian Americans due to its low cost.

This style evolved in the U.S. from the pizza that originated among Italian immigrants (and particularly Neapolitan immigrants) in New York City in the early 1900s, itself derived from the Neapolitan-style pizza made in Italy. Today, it is the dominant style eaten in the New York metropolitan area states of New York and New Jersey and is popular throughout the United States. Regional variations exist throughout the Northeast and elsewhere in the U.S.

In New York, this pizza used to be commonly sold for $1 or 99¢ in small stores along the street, earning it the nickname of "Dollar Pizza" or the "Dollar Slice".

== History ==
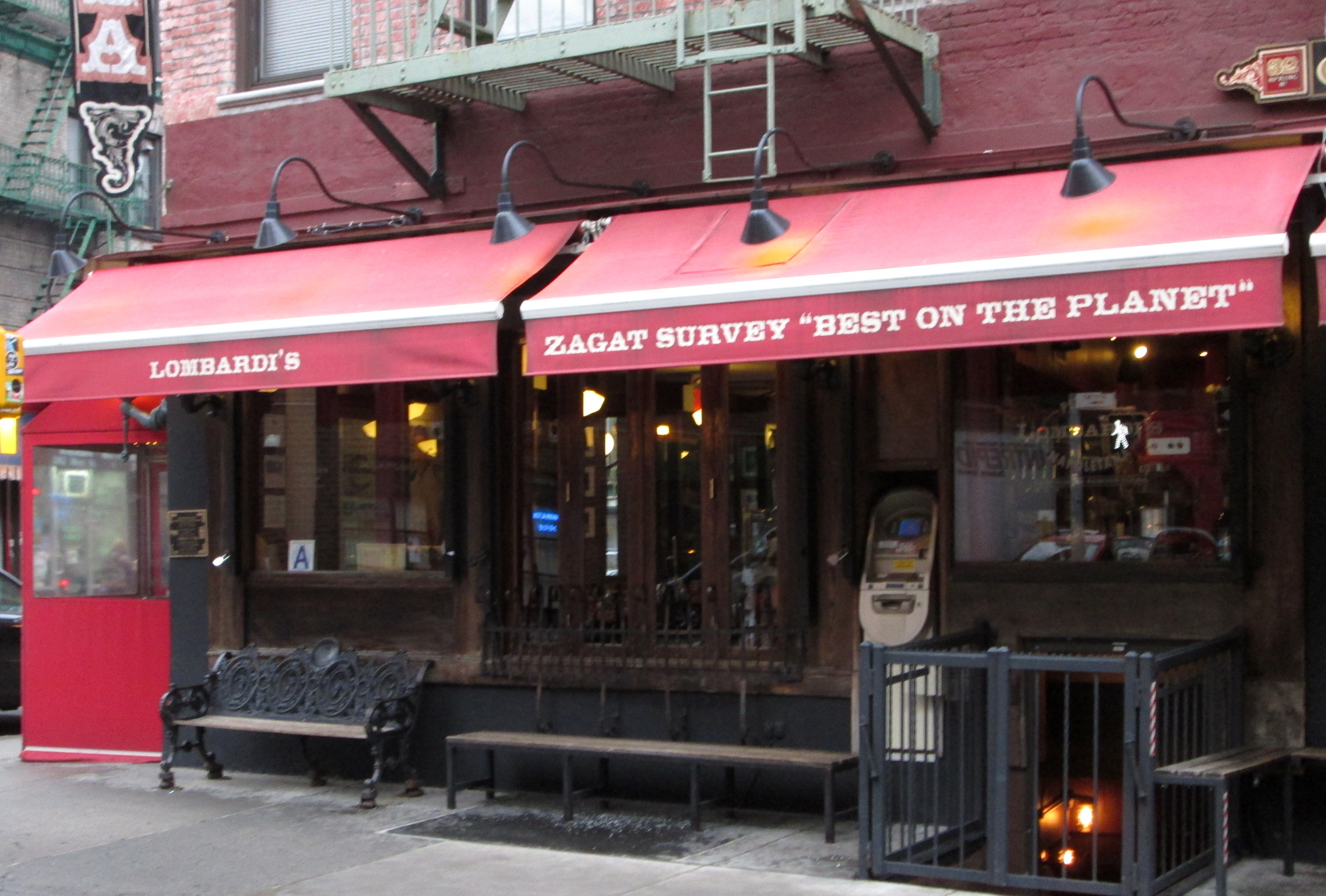
Lombardi's, founded in New York City in 1905, is credited as the first licensed pizzeria in the U.S.

The first pizzeria in the United States, Lombardi's, is said to have been founded by Gennaro Lombardi in New York City's Little Italy in 1905, although this has been challenged by author Peter Regas. An immigrant pizzaiolo ('pizza maker') from Naples, he opened a grocery store in 1897; eight years later, it was licensed to sell pizza by New York State. An employee, Antonio Totonno Pero, began making pizza, which sold for five cents each. Many people could not afford a whole pizza and instead would offer what they could for a correspondingly sized slice, which was wrapped in paper tied with string. In 1924, Totonno left Lombardi's to open his own pizzeria on Coney Island, called Totonno's. Totonno's, Patsy's Pizzeria and John's Pizzeria inspired a renaissance in the growth of pizzerias such as Grimaldi's.

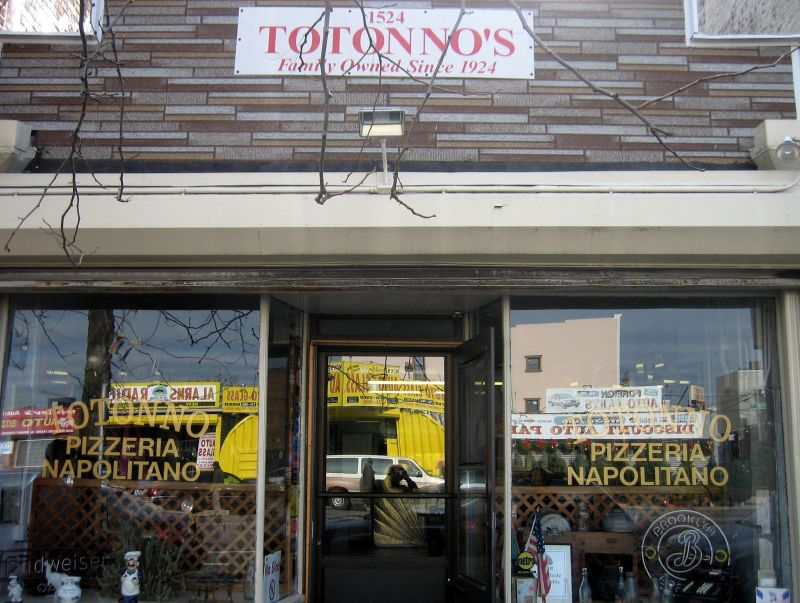
Totonno's, an American pizzeria in Coney Island, Brooklyn, was established in 1924 by Antonio "Totonno" Pero.

By 2010, over 400 pizza restaurants existed in New York City, with hundreds more of varied cuisine also offering pizza.

== Characteristics ==
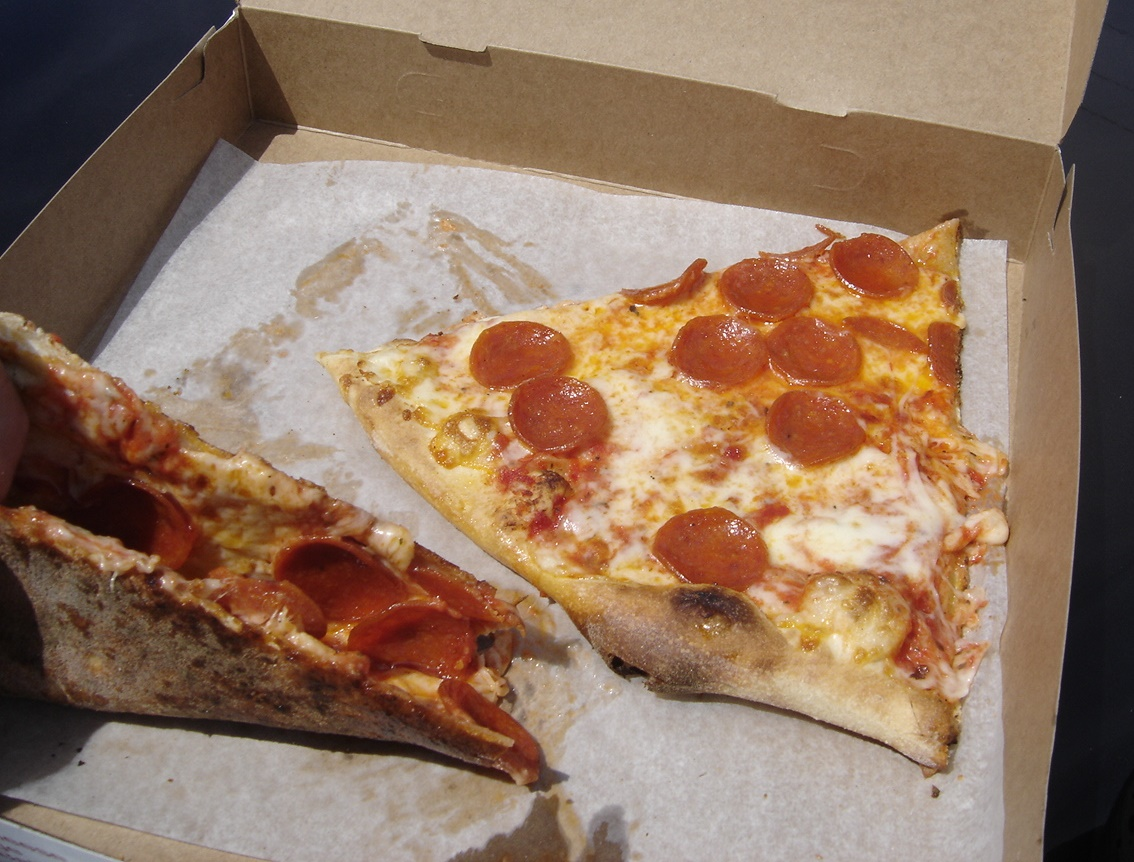
New York-style pepperoni pizza, displaying its characteristic thin foldable crust

New York–style pizza is traditionally hand-tossed, consisting in its basic form of a light layer of tomato sauce sprinkled with dry, grated, full-fat mozzarella cheese; additional toppings, if desired, are placed over the cheese. Pizzas are typically around 18 to 24 inches (45 to 60 cm) in diameter, and commonly cut into eight slices.

New York–style pizza gets its distinguishing crust from the high-gluten bread flour with which it is made. Minerals present in New York City's tap water supply are also credited with giving the dough in metro area pizzas its texture and flavor. Some out-of-state pizza bakers transport the water cross-country.

=== Gallery ===
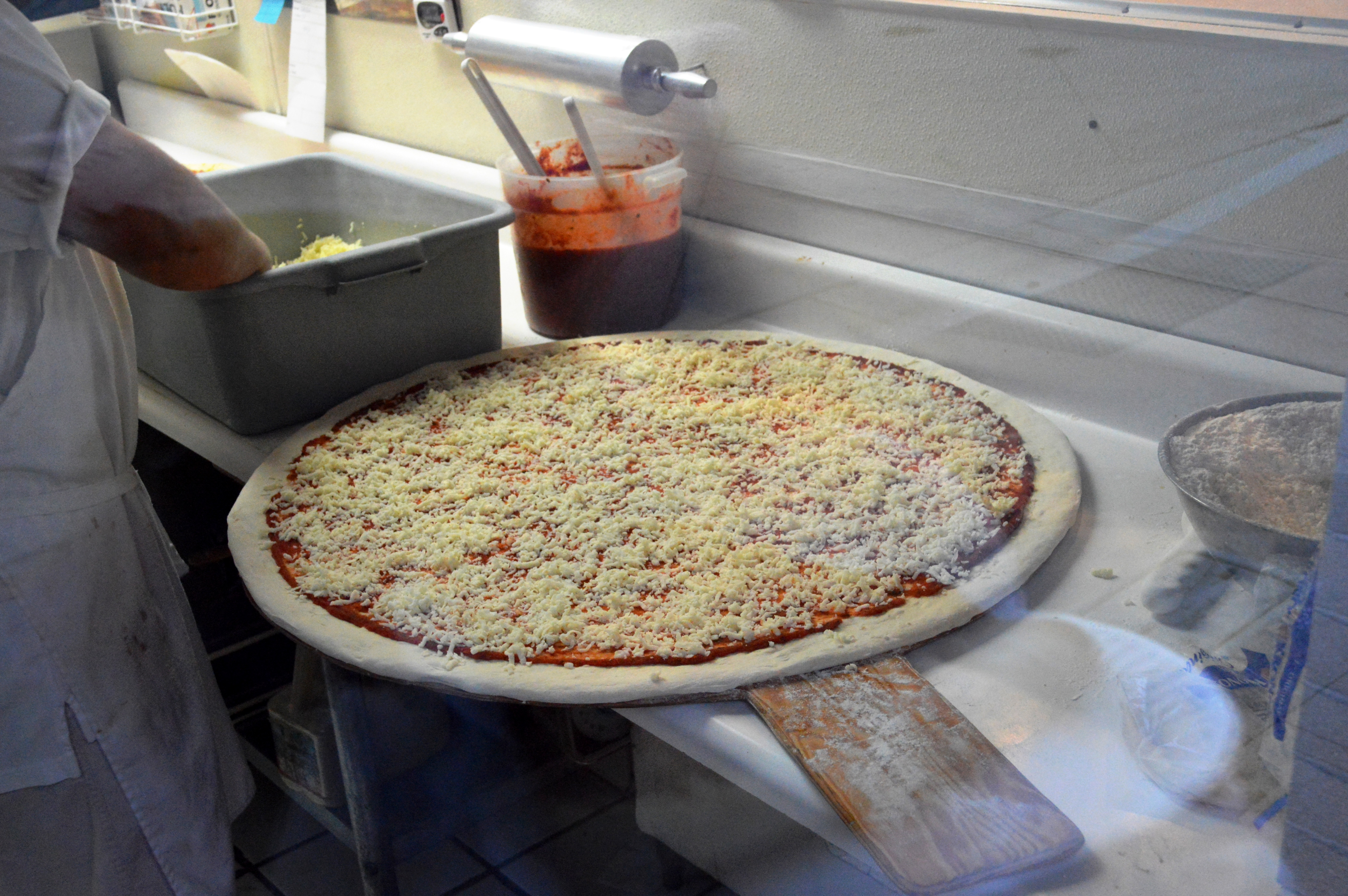
Large New York–style pizza about to enter the oven

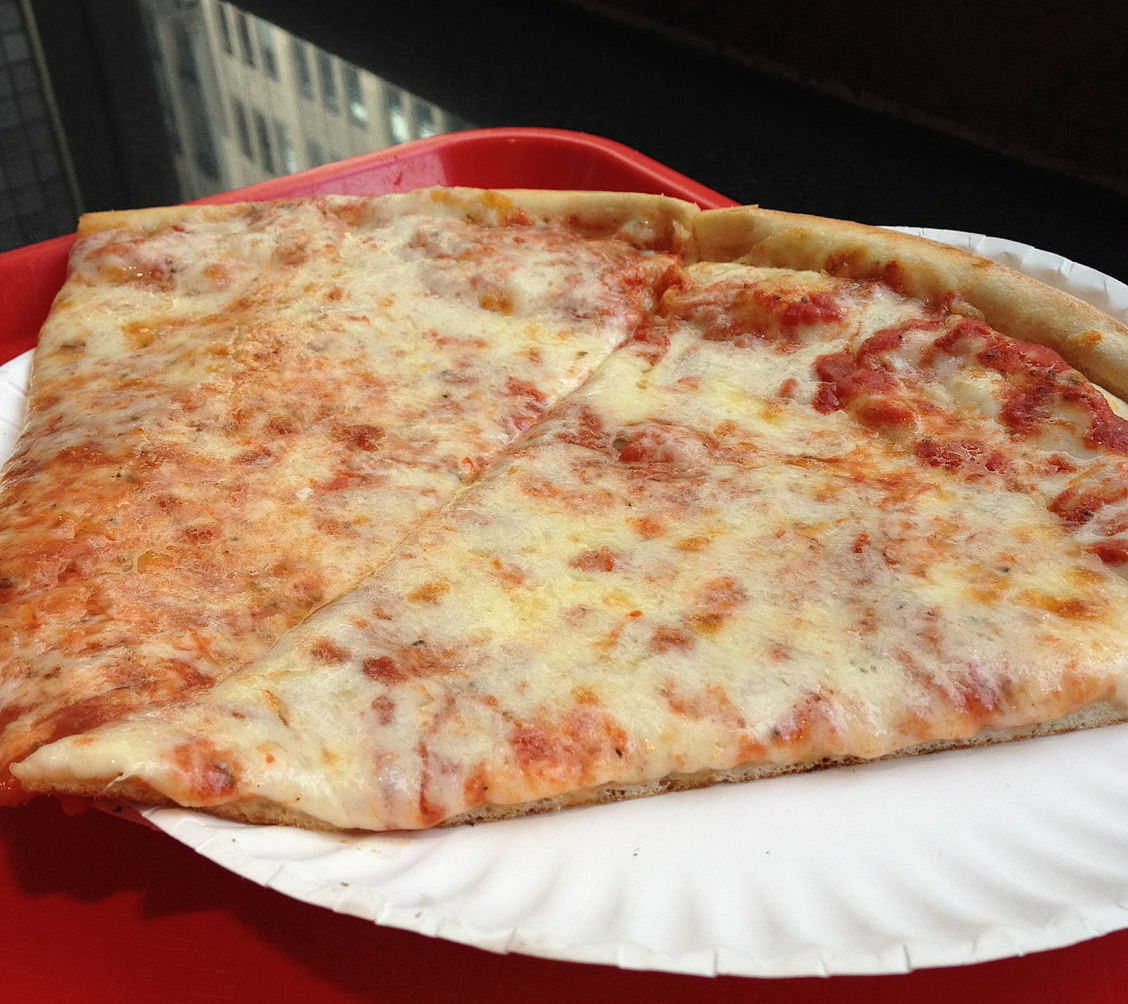
New York-style plain cheese pizza by the slice

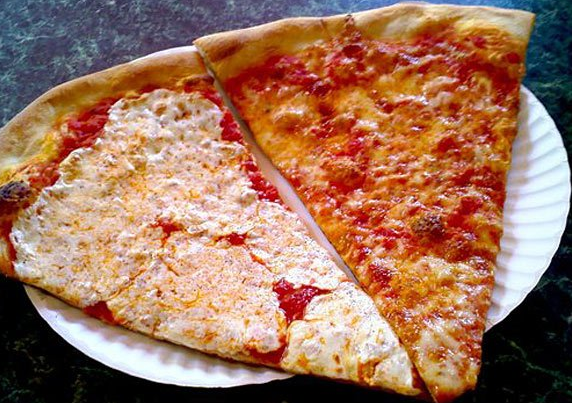
Slices of New York-style pizza on right, with fresh instead of dried mozzarella cheese on left

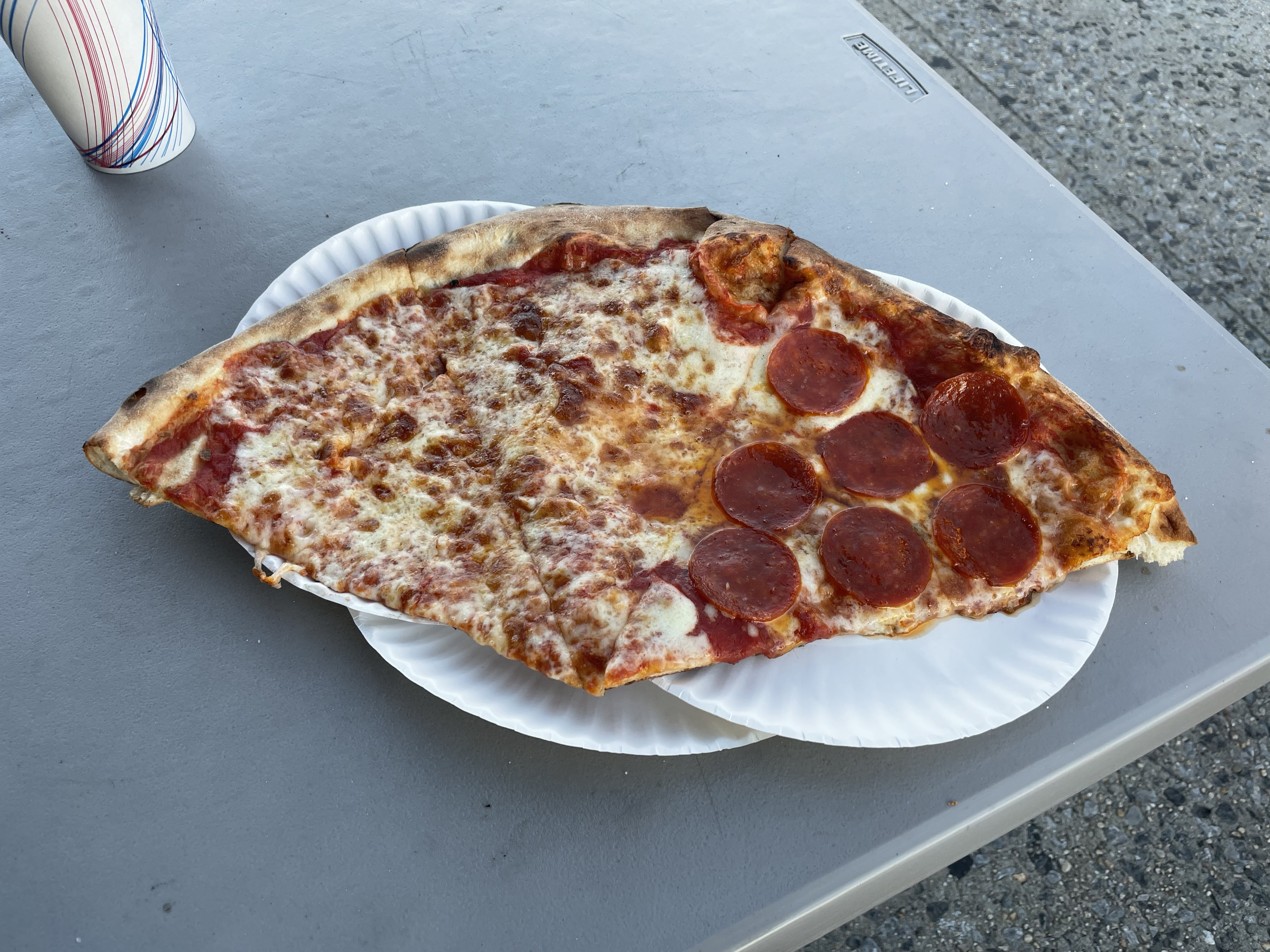
Three New York-style slices from New Park Pizza

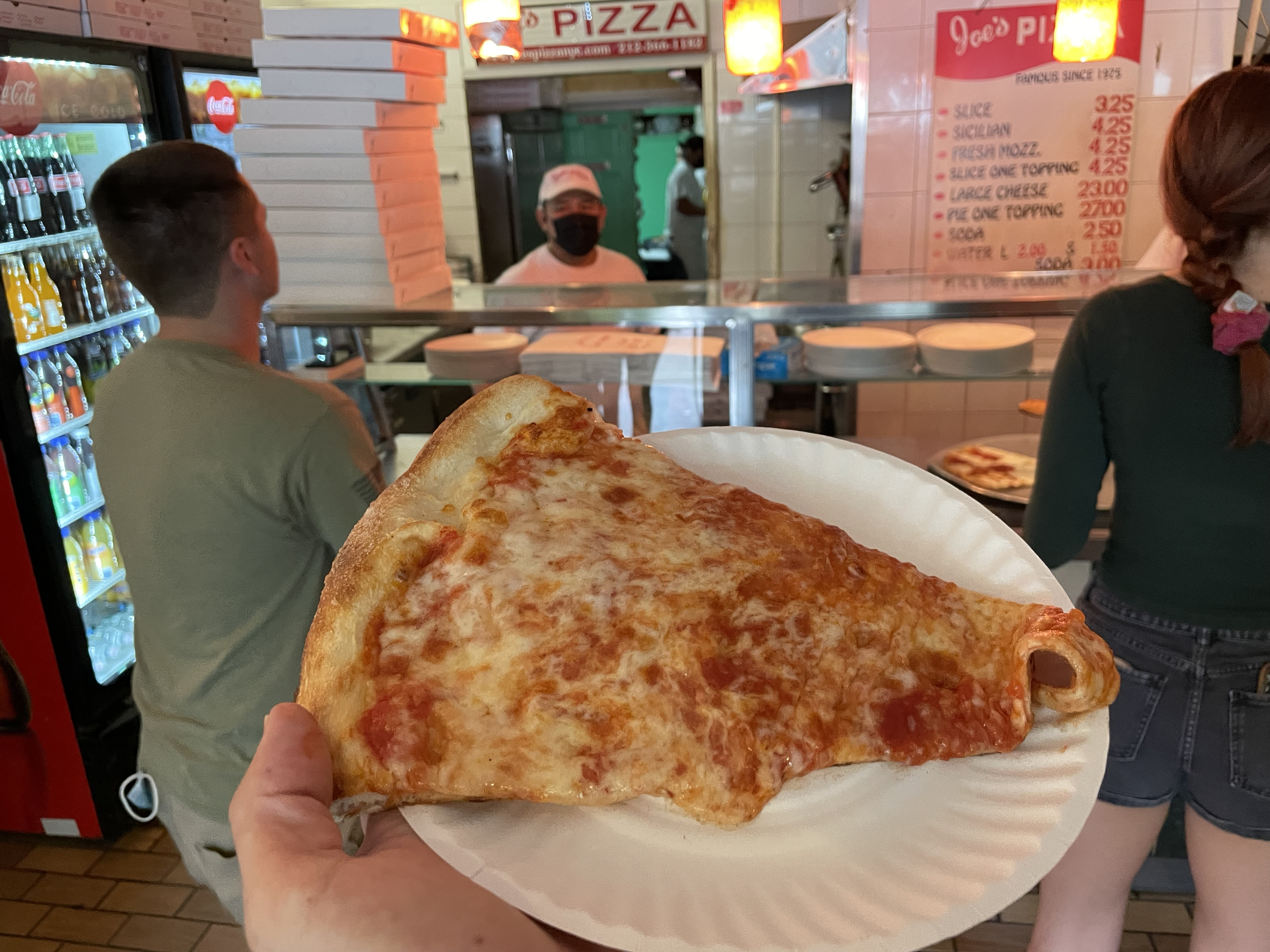
A New York-style slice from Joe's Pizza

== Regional variations ==
New York–style pizza is most prevalent in New York, New Jersey, Pennsylvania, Maryland, Delaware, District of Columbia, and Connecticut, but can be found throughout the Northeastern region and beyond. Outside this area, many pizzas described as "New York–style", including those of major pizza chains such as Pizza Hut, generally do not fall within the variations commonly accepted as genuine in its native area.

== See also ==
- Pizza in the United States
- Pan pizza
- Jumbo slice – very large slice of pizza
- Pizza Principle – comparison between the cost of a slice of pizza and a subway ride in New York City
