= Patsy's Pizzeria =

Coordinates: 40.79707°N 73.93480°W

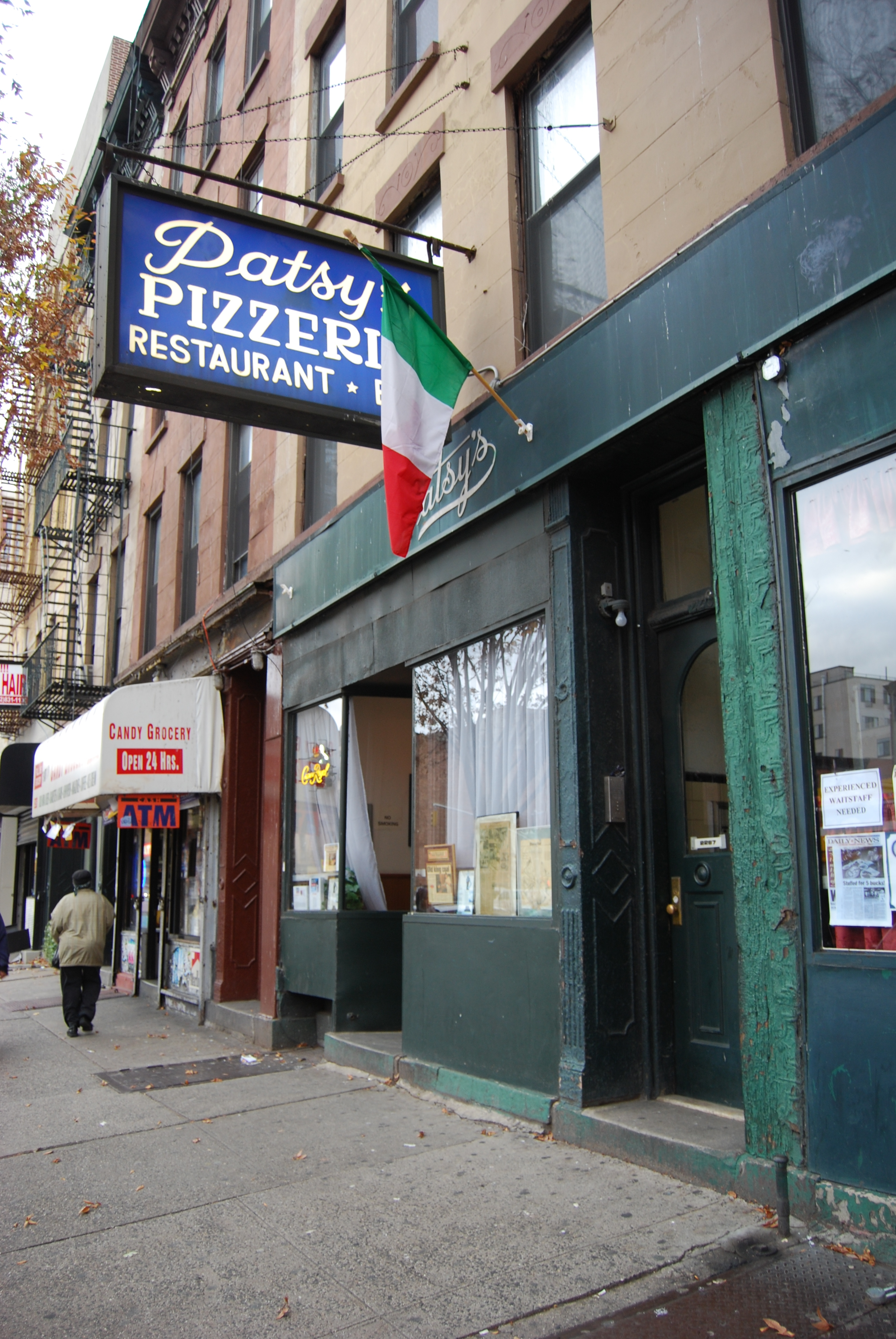
- Entrance to Patsy's Pizzeria
- Interactive map of Patsy's Pizzeria

Restaurant information
- Established: 1933; 93 years ago
- Owner: Frank Brija
- Previous owner: Pasquale "Patsy" Lancieri
- Food type: Italian-American pizzeria
- Dress code: casual
- Location: 2287 1st Avenue and East 117th Street in East Harlem, New York City, Manhattan, 10035, United States
- Other locations: 12 locations in New York, and counting
- Other information: Franchise owned by Frank Brija
- Website: www.patsyspizzeria.us

Patsy's Pizzeria is a historic coal-oven pizzeria in New York City. Opened in Italian Harlem in 1933, it was regarded as one of New York's original pizzerias for its use of traditional New York style thin crust pizza.

== History ==
Patsy's Pizzeria was founded in what used to be the predominantly Italian neighborhood of East Harlem, or Italian Harlem, in 1933 by Pasquale "Patsy" Lanceri. When it opened it was one of New York's earliest pizzerias along with Lombardi's, Totonno's and John's. Patsy's claims to have originated the idea of selling pizza by the slice. Lancieri is said to have learned his craft at Lombardi's brick-walled coal oven. New York's pizza dynasties are now in their third and fourth generations, and counting.

Patsy's Pizzeria was sold and expanded after its founder's death to Frank Brija, an Albanian from Kosovo, who bought the pizzeria from its founder's widow in 1991. Brija, the current owner of the East Harlem Patsy's Pizzeria, trademarked the name and in 1995 opened Patsy's Pizzeria franchise at 509 Third Avenue, near 34th Street. Tsoulos, "a member of a Greek pizza-making clan in Queens", and his partners opened four more franchise locations in Manhattan.

== Dispute over Patsy's name ==
The original Patsy died in the 1970s and his widow sold the East Harlem pizzeria to longtime employees in 1991, "to the chagrin of Patsy Grimaldi, her nephew, who opened a Patsy's in Brooklyn in 1990". The feuding deepened when Frank Brija began expanding his Patsy's Pizzeria franchise in Manhattan, and Patsy Grimaldi changed the name of his pizzeria to Grimaldi's Pizzeria, which The New York Times reported is the best and truest to the original.

In 2009, there was a legal battle with Patsy's Restaurant on West 56th Street, founded by Pasquale (Patsy) Scognamillo in 1944 and a haven for Frank Sinatra and many celebrities, and Patsy's Pizzeria which was sold to Frank Brija in 1991.

== Renaissance of pizza ==
A story from The New York Times reported in 1998 that, before the "pizza renaissance" of the 1990s, "the classic pizza was on the endangered list, treasured as an artifact of old New York but bypassed by a culture that preferred its pizzas fast, cheap and delivered." The tradition was kept alive by "just a few pizza landmarks, most famously John's Pizzeria on Bleecker Street, Patsy's Pizza in East Harlem and Totonno's Pizzeria Napolitano in Coney Island ... [who] zealously preserved the traditions." Environmental regulations made it hard to build new coal ovens because they could only be rebuilt or replaced under an environmental grandfather clause, "not installed from scratch." According to The New York Times, "Pizza makers have become architectural historians, seeking out spaces that once housed a coal-burning oven, like old bakeries or restaurants".

In 2019, a waiter at Patsy's Pizzeria returned a $423,987.55 cashier's check to a customer who left it behind on one of their tables. The customer had left without tipping, after complaining that the restaurant didn't have enough photos of women on their walls.

== Media ==
Patsy's Pizzeria was featured in a Manhattan-based episode of the Cooking Channel show Man v. Food, which first aired on April 7, 2020.

Patsy's features prominently in the 2024 apocalyptic horror film A Quiet Place: Day One. The facade of the restaurant was recreated as a set in England, based on extensive photography of the real restaurant by the production.

== See also ==
- List of restaurants in New York City
- Pizza in the United States
