= Juliana's Pizza =

Restaurant in Brooklyn, New York

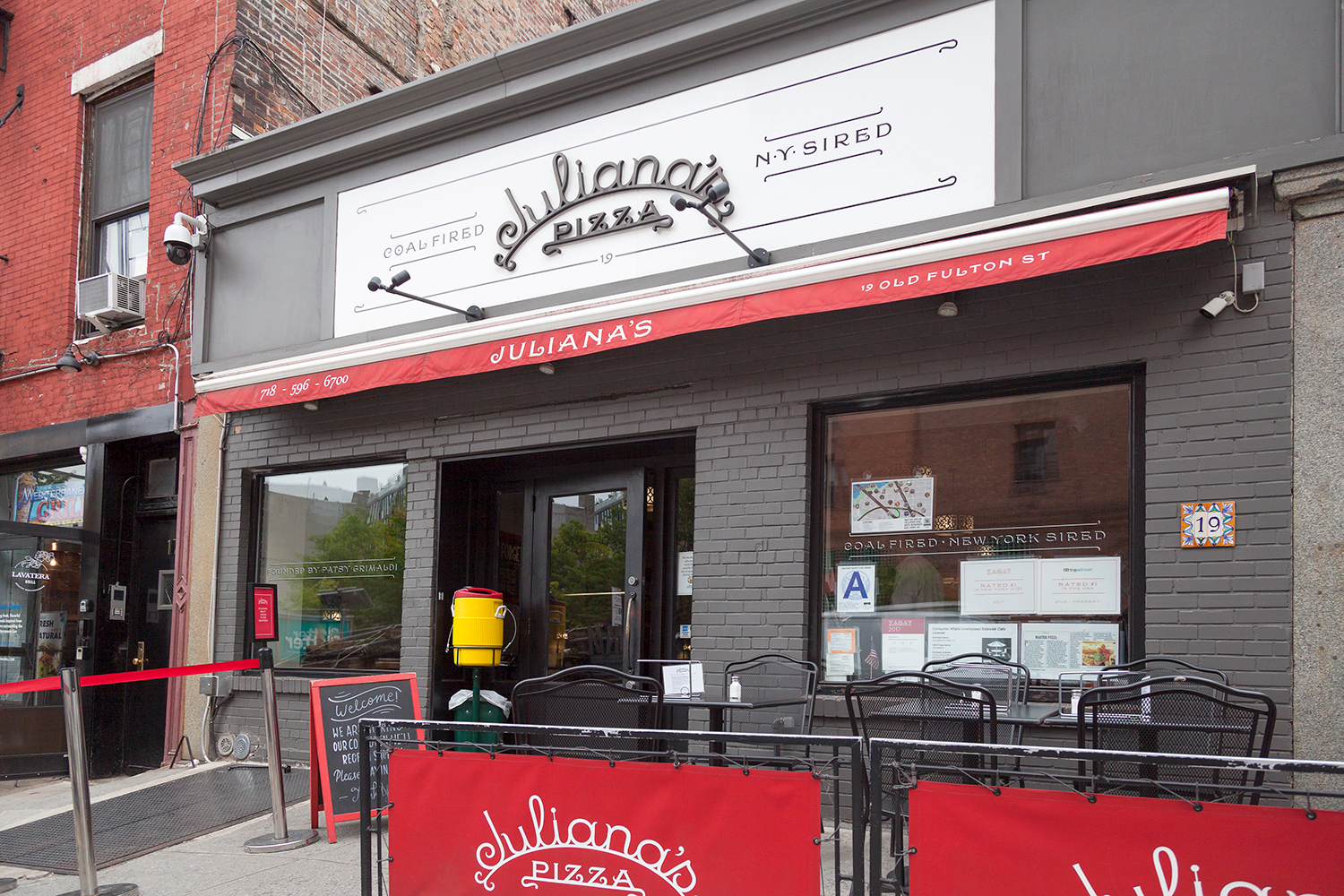
- Interactive map of Juliana's Pizza

Restaurant information
- Established: 2012; 14 years ago
- Owner: Pasquale "Patsy" Grimaldi
- Food type: Italian-American pizzeria
- Location: 19 Old Fulton St., New York City, Brooklyn, 11201, United States
- Coordinates: 40°42′10″N 73°59′36″W
- Website: www.julianaspizza.com

Juliana's is a pizzeria located in Brooklyn, New York, founded in 2012 by Pasquale "Patsy" Grimaldi and named after his mother. In 2015, it was rated the best pizzeria in the United States on TripAdvisor.

== History ==
=== Backstory and founding (1925-2012) ===
Pasquale "Patsy" Lancieri founded a bakery in East Harlem in 1925. He converted the bakery to a pizzeria in 1933 and named it Patsy's Pizzeria, hiring his namesake nephew Pasquale "Patsy" Grimaldi as a cook. Following in his uncle's footsteps, Grimaldi opened Grimaldi's Pizzeria on Old Fulton Street in 1990. The building has a history dating back to the 18th century, originally built as a tavern and later owned by Dipoline Manufacturing Company before becoming a pizzeria. In 1998, Grimaldi retired and sold the Grimaldi's brand name and franchise to Frank Ciolli. Several years later, Ciolli moved Grimaldi's Pizzeria to a larger building next door. In 2011, Grimaldi announced he was coming out of retirement at the age of 80, but was unable to open a restaurant in his own name due to selling his brand rights.

In 2012, he opened Juliana's, named after his mother Maria "Juliana" Lancieri Grimaldi, in Grimaldi's former location, starting a rivalry between the two. According to AMNY, the rivalry is "playful." The original opening, slated for March 2012, was delayed due to lawsuits with Grimaldi's, and the final opening was in December 2012. Without serving pizza by the slice, only the pie, Juliana's menu included "food from the Grimaldi's youth: pizza made with fresh mozzarella in a coal-fired oven; seltzer from glass bottles and egg creams made with U-Bet chocolate syrup. Before the pandemic, they sold about 40 egg creams a week to customers of all ages, many of them curious tourists."

=== Recent (2018-2022) ===
In January 2020, Juliana’s threatened legal action against another restaurant named Juliana’s Pizzeria in West Hartford, Connecticut, forcing the restaurant to change its name to Bert’s Pizza.

== See also ==
- List of Italian restaurants
- List of restaurants in New York City
