= Gennaro Lombardi =

American businessman

- Born: August 6, 1887; Italy
- Died: November 24, 1958 (aged 71); United States
- Occupation: Restaurateur
- Known for: Association with Lombardi's Pizza, one of the earliest pizzerias in the United States

Gennaro Lombardi (August 6, 1887 – November 24, 1958) was an Italian immigrant who moved to the United States in 1904. He has sometimes been credited for opening the first pizzeria in the United States, Lombardi's, at 53½ Spring Street. However, later research has shown both that he did not open the restaurant and that other New York pizzerias preceded.

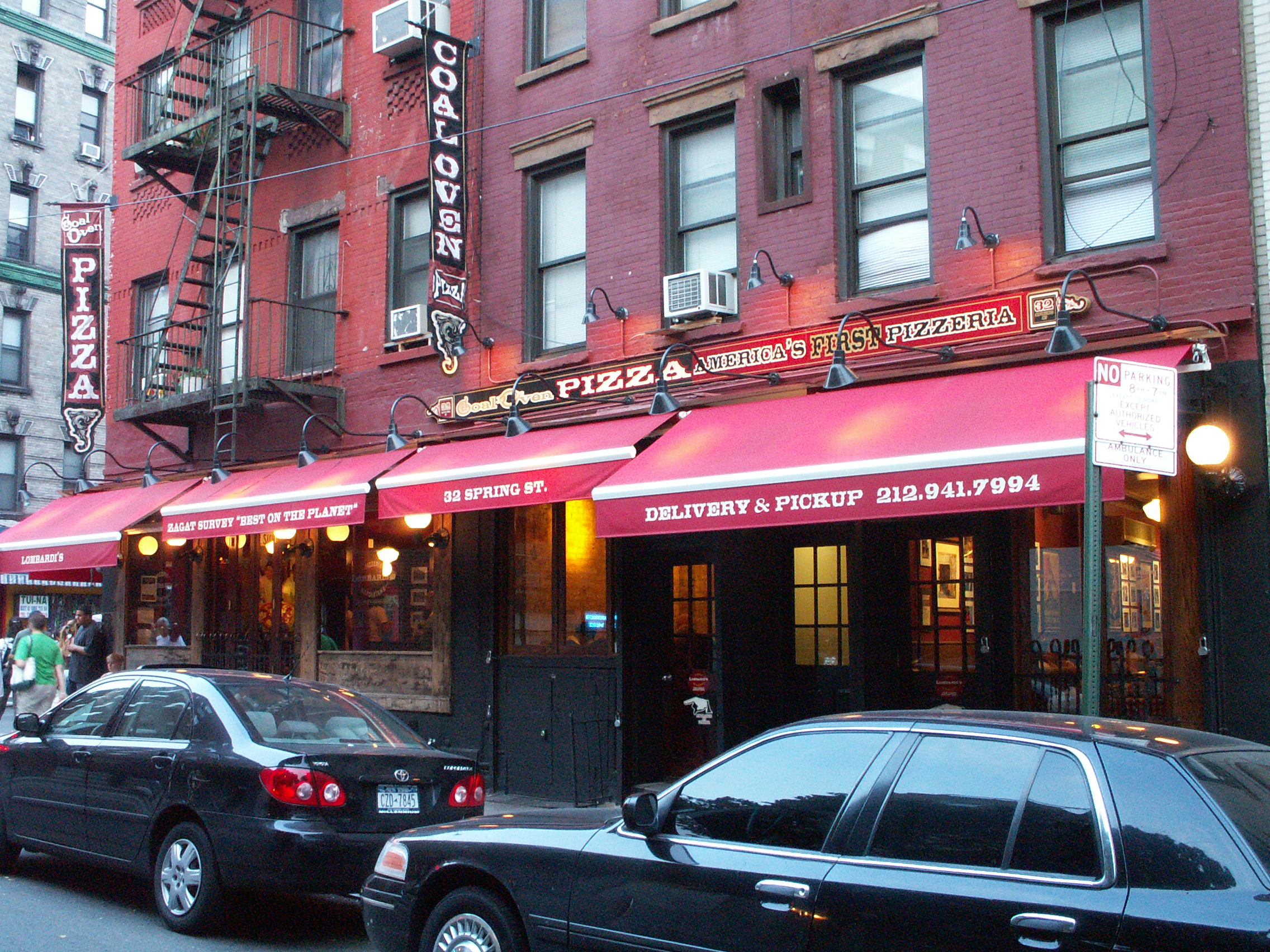
Lombardi's Pizza at 32 Spring Street in Little Italy, Manhattan

The traditional story holds that Lombardi opened a small grocery store in New York City's Little Italy. An employee of his, fellow Italian immigrant Antonio Totonno Pero, began making pizza for the store to sell. Their pizza became so popular that Lombardi opened the first U.S. pizzeria in 1905, naming it simply Lombardi's. Although Lombardi was influenced by the pies of Naples, he was forced to adapt pizza to Americans. The wood-fired ovens and mozzarella di bufala were substituted with coal powered ovens and fior di latte (made from cow's milk), beginning the evolution of the American pie. In 1924, Totonno left Lombardi's and followed the expanding New York City Subway lines to Coney Island, where he opened Totonno's.

Later research has cast suspicion on elements of that narrative. Gennaro Lombardi came to the United States for the first time in November 1904 at age 17, classified as a laborer. If he became involved with the pizzeria at 53½ Spring Street in 1905, it was as an employee, not as an owner. Research suggests Filippo Milone opened the pizzeria, as well as two others documented before 1905. Milone also opened the pizzeria that would become John's of Bleecker Street in 1915.

New York city directories also list a different pizzeria (Giovanni Albano's at 59½ Mulberry St.) already open in 1894. As for the restaurant commonly named Lombardi's, records show it was being operated by Giovanni Santillo as "Antica Pizzeria Napoletana" several months before Lombardi arrived in the United States. Lombardi did own the pizzeria briefly in 1908 and again permanently after 1918; the name "Lombardi’s Restaurant" dates only to 1939.

== See also ==
- Italian-American cuisine
- New York-style pizza
