= Joe's Pizza =

Pizzeria in Manhattan, New York

Coordinates: 40.730656°N 74.002190°W

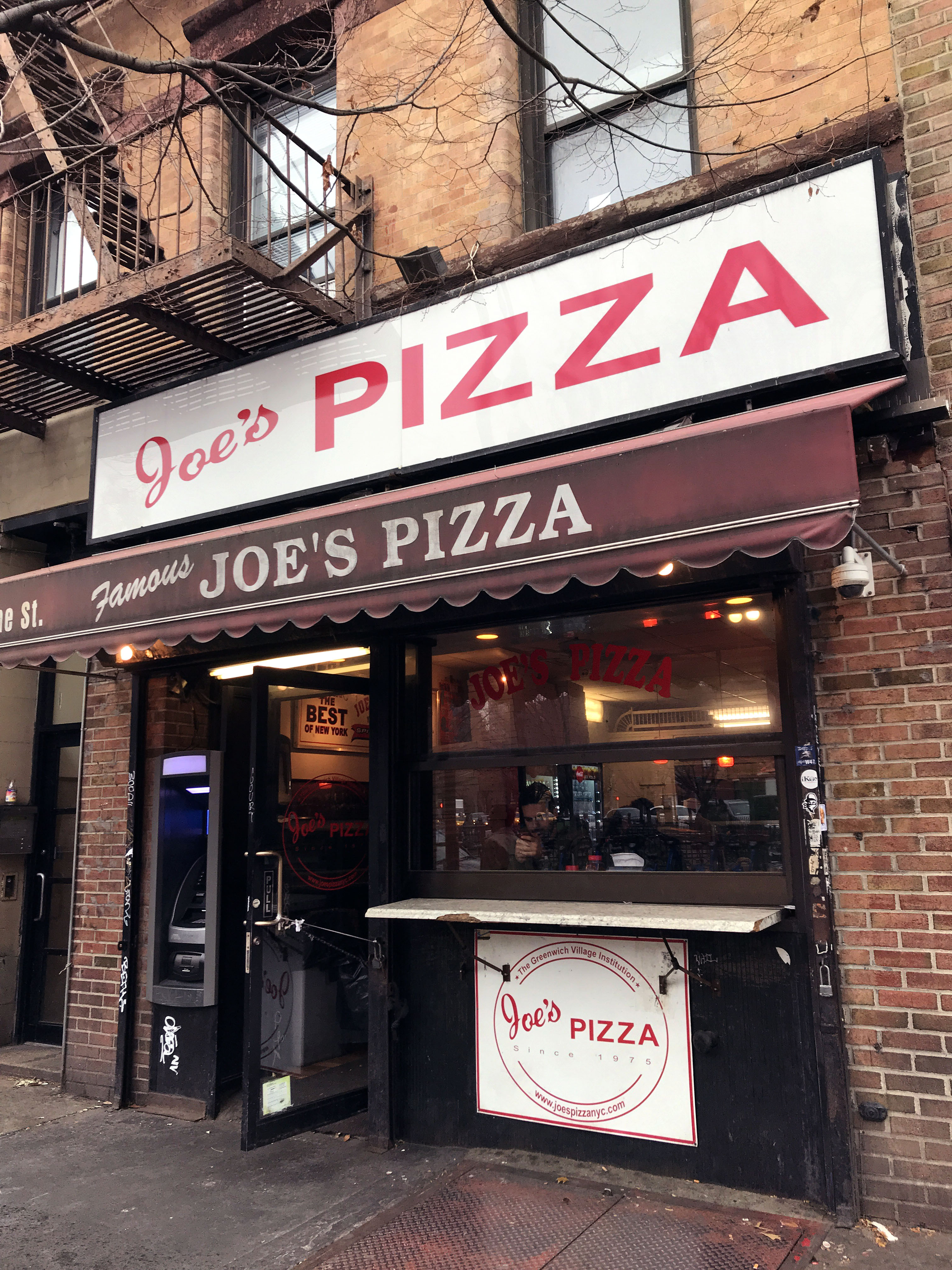
- The Greenwich Village location of Joe's Pizza in November 2018
- Interactive map of Joe's Pizza

Restaurant information
- Established: 1975; 51 years ago
- Owner: Pino Pozzuoli
- Head chef: Pino Pozzuoli
- Food type: Italian-American pizzeria
- Location: 7 Carmine Street, New York City, Manhattan, 10014, United States
- Other locations: 150 East 14th Street
- Website: www.joespizzanyc.com

Joe's Pizza, also called Famous Joe's Pizza, is a pizzeria located in Greenwich Village, Manhattan, New York City on Carmine Street near Bleecker Street. The restaurant is known for serving a classic New York street-style pizza and has been called a "Greenwich Village institution". The pizzeria serves by the slice or as full pies.

== Locations ==
In addition to its original location in Greenwich Village, Joe's Pizza has four other locations New York City: in Manhattan at 150 East 14th Street, 1435 Broadway, and 124 Fulton Street, and in Brooklyn at 216 Bedford Avenue. Joe's also has multiple locations located elsewhere in the United States: in Ann Arbor, Michigan, at 1107 S University Ave, and in Cambridge, Massachusetts at 3 Brattle Street in Harvard Square. In the late 2010s, Joe's expanded internationally when three locations were opened in districts of Shanghai, China: Jing'an, Xuhui, and Changning.

== History ==
Joe's was founded in 1975 by Pino "Joe" Pozzuoli, an Italian immigrant originally from Naples, Italy. The restaurant briefly closed in 2005, but has since reopened.

Joe's Pizza offers traditional New York slice-style pizza. In 2018, New York Times restaurant critic Pete Wells noted, “When neoclassical slice-shop owners say they emulate the old-school joints that still obsess over quality, Joe’s is one of the places they’re talking about.” Joe has been described by Ed Levine as a “slice purist”, and the restaurant serves only pizza.

== In popular culture ==
Joe's Pizza appears in the 2001 video game Grand Theft Auto III as it is located in two different areas of the game. However, both of the pizza parlors are inaccessible to the player. The pizza parlor appears once again in Grand Theft Auto: Liberty City Stories, where it remains inaccessible.

In the 2004 film, Spider-Man 2, Peter Parker works at Joe's Pizza as a delivery boy, but is fired due to his constant tardiness and excessive delivery mishaps resulting from his career as Spider-Man. The pizzeria has gained notability since its appearance in the film, with several of its New York locations touting its appearance.

In 2011, Joe's Pizza made an appearance in an episode of Conan on TBS, when host Conan O’Brien visited in order to learn how to make authentic New York City pizza.

Joe's appears in the Marvel Cinematic Universe series Jessica Jones and Iron Fist. In Jessica Jones, Trish Walker orders a pizza from Joe's before going on the run. In Iron Fist, Claire Temple orders a pizza from Joe's to socialize with Davos, who reluctantly tries it due to his veganism.

In 2022, Joe's Pizza appeared in a commercial for Doctor Strange in the Multiverse of Madness in the form of a food truck. Like Spider-Man 2, the film was also directed by Sam Raimi.

== See also ==
- List of Italian restaurants
- List of restaurants in New York City
