= Artichoke Basille's Pizza =

American pizza restaurant chain

Restaurant information
- Food type: Pizza
- Location: United States
- Other locations: New York City, Oakland and Berkeley, California, Staten Island, New Brunswick and Red Bank, New Jersey, Tempe, Arizona

Artichoke Basille's Pizza is pizza restaurant chain based in New York City. In addition to Manhattan, it has locations in Oakland and Berkeley, California, Staten Island, New Brunswick, New Jersey, Red Bank, New Jersey, and Tempe, Arizona.
