= Totonno's =

Pizzeria in Brooklyn, New York

Coordinates: 40°34′44.1″N 73°59′1.51″W

Totonno's Pizzeria Napolitano
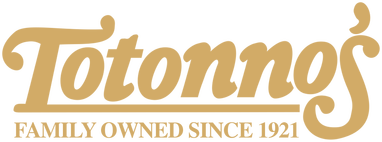

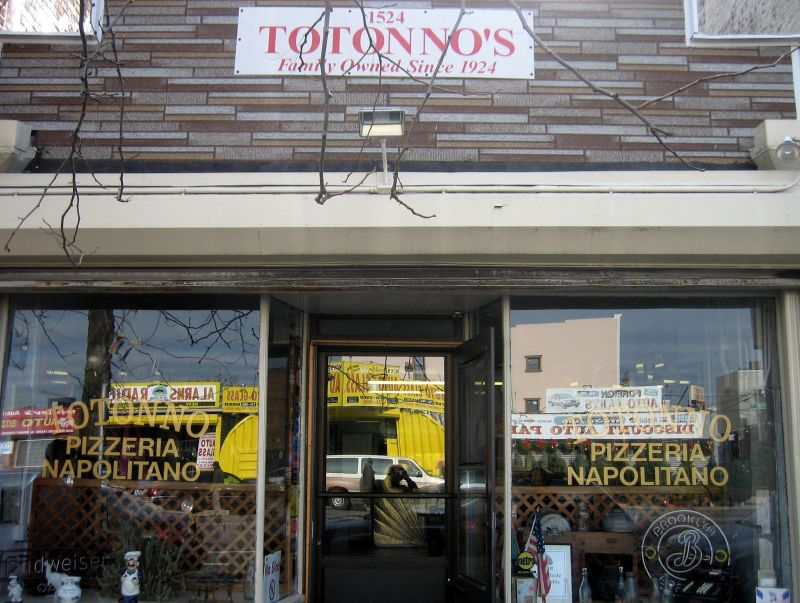
- Totonno's pizzeria in 2008
- Interactive map of Totonno's Pizzeria Napolitano

Restaurant information
- Established: 1924; 102 years ago
- Location: 1524 Neptune Ave, Brooklyn, New York, 11224, United States
- Website: totonnosconeyisland.com

Totonno's is an American pizzeria located at 1524 Neptune Avenue (between West 15th Street and West 16th Street) in Coney Island in Brooklyn, New York. It was established in 1924 by Antonio "Totonno" Pero.

== History ==
Totonno was an employee at the Lombardi's pizzeria on Spring Street in New York's Little Italy that was established in 1905 when he began selling tomato pies cooked in a coal oven and wrapped in paper and tied with a string. In 1924, Totonno left Lombardi's to open his own pizzeria on Coney Island called Totonno's. It is owned by Louise Ciminieri and known for its lines out the door, longevity, and delicious food. Pero can be seen in a photograph with Lombardi, whose employ he left in 1924, "shortly after the subway started running out to the hinterlands of Coney Island, and opened his own place there".

Totonno's pizza has been made the same way since 1924 and, "along with its Brooklyn pizza brethren Di Fara Pizza, Grimaldi's and Franny's ... is considered among the best in the country by people who have dedicated their lives to the subject". James Oseland, editor-in-chief of Saveur magazine, attributes a "quintessential New York City flavor profile" to Totonno's.

Totonno's is one of a handful of pizzerias that use a coal fired brick oven, which imparts its unique flavor to pies baked in it. New coal ovens do not pass current environmental laws in New York, but the old ovens are grandfathered as long as the business remains open.

The original location was damaged by fire in 2009, but reopened. In October 2012, Totonno's was among several landmark New York restaurants devastated by Hurricane Sandy. Although they had planned to open by the end of the year, they re-opened in mid-January 2013. In 2021 they closed temporarily due to the COVID-19 pandemic in New York City. In May 2024, the owners started publicly looking for a potential buyer to take over the restaurant. Explaining their decision, Ciminieri said, "We’re coming up in age and we don’t have the manpower to continue."

Totonno's has been featured on various television shows, such as Ugly Delicious, Somebody Feed Phil, and The Pizza Show.

== See also ==
- List of James Beard America's Classics
- List of restaurants in New York City
