= Pizza al taglio =

Pizza baked in large rectangular trays, sold by the slice

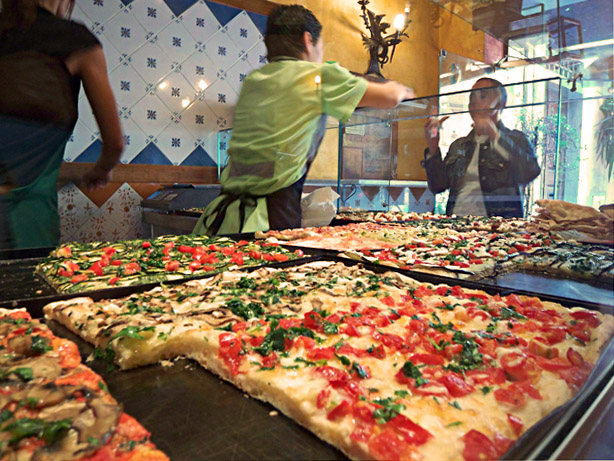
- Alternative names: Pizza al trancio
- Type: Pizza
- Place of origin: Italy
- Region or state: Rome, Lazio
- Main ingredients: Pizza dough, sauce, cheese, toppings

Pizza al taglio or pizza al trancio (lit. 'pizza by the slice') is a variety of pizza baked in large rectangular trays, and generally sold in rectangular or square slices by weight, with prices marked per kilogram or per 100 grams. This type of pizza was developed in Rome, Italy, and is common throughout Italy. Many variations and styles of pizza al taglio exist, and the dish is available in other areas of the world in addition to Italy.

== Preparation ==
In the most traditional Italian pizza al taglio shops, such as pizzerias and bakeries, pizza is often cooked in a wood-fired oven. In today's establishments, electric ovens are also often used. The rectangular pizza shape makes it easier to cut and divide the pizza to the buyer's desire, which is often distinguished by weight. The dish is often eaten as a casual, takeaway dish that is eaten outside the restaurants where it is served, such as in a square.

== See also ==
Media related to Pizza al taglio at Wikimedia Commons

- Pizza by the slice
