= Pizza box =

Cardboard boxes for storing pizza

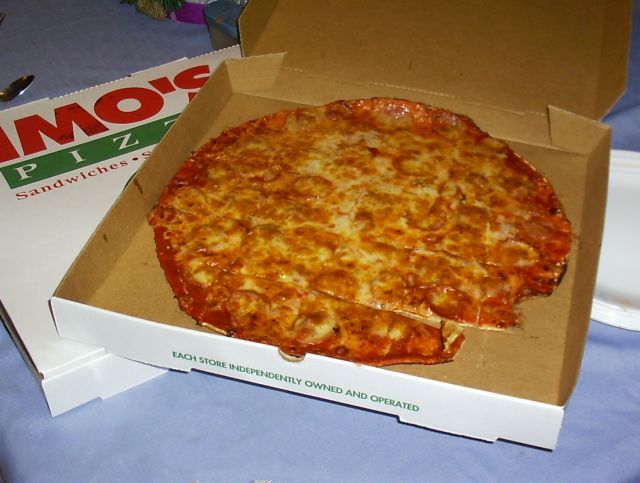
A pizza in an Imo's Pizza box

A pizza box or pizza package is a folding packaging box usually made of corrugated fiberboard in which hot pizzas are stored for home delivery or take-out. It is typically thermally insulated to keep the pizza hot. In addition, it may provide space for advertising. The boxes used by pizzerias differ from those of frozen pizzas, which contain the frozen product in heat-sealed plastic foils, as is the case with much frozen food.

== History ==
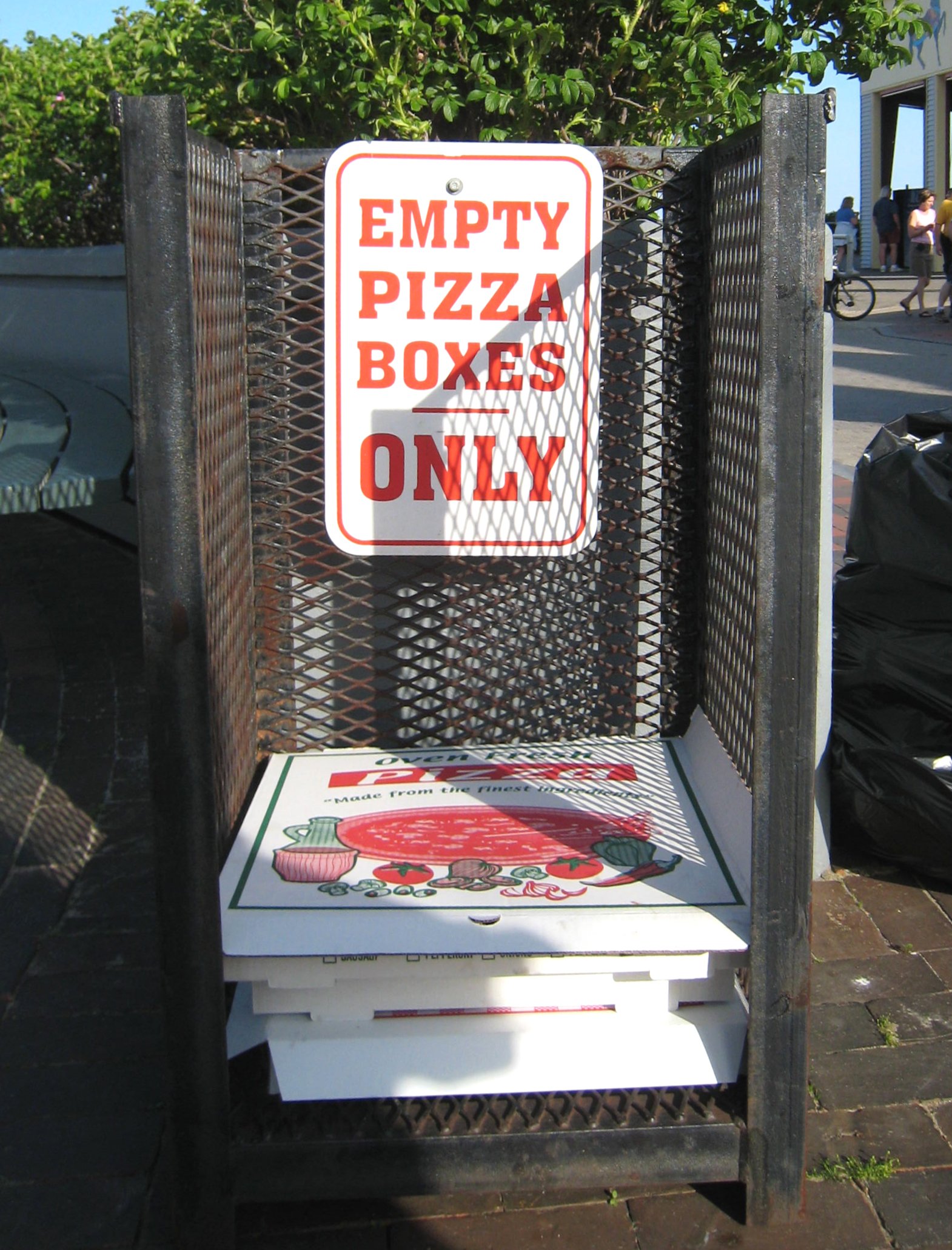
A pizza box collection point at Old Orchard Beach, Maine

Containers to deliver freshly baked pizzas have existed at least since the 19th century, when Neapolitan pizza bakers put their products in multi-layered metallic containers known as stufe (singular stufa, "oven") and then sent them to the street sellers. The aerated container was round and made of tin or copper. Disposable packaging started to be developed in the United States, after the Second World War. At that time pizza was becoming increasingly popular and the first pizza delivery services were created. In the beginning they attempted to deliver pizzas in simple corrugated boxes, similar to those used in cake shops, but these often became wet, bent or even broke in two. Other pizza chefs tried to put pizzas on plates and transport them inside paper bags. This partly solved the problem. However, it was almost impossible to transport more than a single pizza inside one bag. In this way, the pizzas on the top would have ruined the surface of the others.

The first patent for a pizza box made of corrugated fiberboard was applied in 1963 and it already displayed the characteristics of today's pizza packaging: plane blanks, foldability without need of adhesive, stackability and ventilation slots. The combination of such slots along with water vapour absorbing materials (absorption agent) prevented the humidity build-ups that characterized traditional transport packaging. It is assumed by brand historians that the pizza box was invented by Domino's Pizza, even if they did not file a patent application. Until 1988, this chain employed a type of packaging whose front side was not directly connected to the lateral sides, but rather the flaps fixed to the lateral sides were folded inward under the lid. This design is also known as "Chicago folding". Domino's was the first pizza producer which employed pizza boxes on a large scale and in this way expanded its delivery range beyond the area immediately close to the pizzeria. Towards the end of the 1960s, the delivery service was further developed thanks to the introduction of heat-insulating bags.

In October 2019, restaurant chain Pizza Hut announced that it was trying out a new high-tech round design of pizza box. The new model held heat better, allowed grease to drain, and was made of compostable, biodegradable bagasse (fibers from sugar cane).

== Requirements ==
=== Stability and stackability ===
Traditional way of folding a pizza box

Most packaging for the transport of pizzas is made of cardboard, as this is both cheap, easy to work with and lightweight while maintaining adequate structural integrity to hold and deliver pizzas. Both solid fiber board and single wall corrugated board are used. The corrugated cardboard in use is often of the E flute size (micro or fine waves with a flute pitch of 1.0 to 1.8 mm), but thicker B flute cardboard with a flute pitch of 2.2 to 3.0 mm are also used. Not only the geometric construction of the cardboard determines the stability of the box, but also especially the type of paper and its grammage. For the liner mostly containerboard is used on the inside of the box. This does not only make the box stable, it becomes more resistant against humidity and oil as well. To reduce the space needed to store the packaging to a minimum, the pizza boxes are folded just before use out of flat blanks. The required storage space depends very much on the different thickness of the material.

Pizza boxes made from solid fiber board take up about half the space the boxes with E flute size cardboard need, and a quarter of the space of those made of B flute size cardboard. Apart from the material itself, the stability of the box is determined by the form it is folded into. The type of pizza box with flaps firmly attached to the side walls that are folded into the front wall has established itself as the standard. In this case, the walls of the box are connected at the edges and this increases its stability. The traditional way of folding the box is an example of this folding type. Its disadvantage is that the walls of the box rise vertically which makes cutting the pizza in the box with a pizza cutter more difficult.

=== Heat insulation and humidity regulation ===
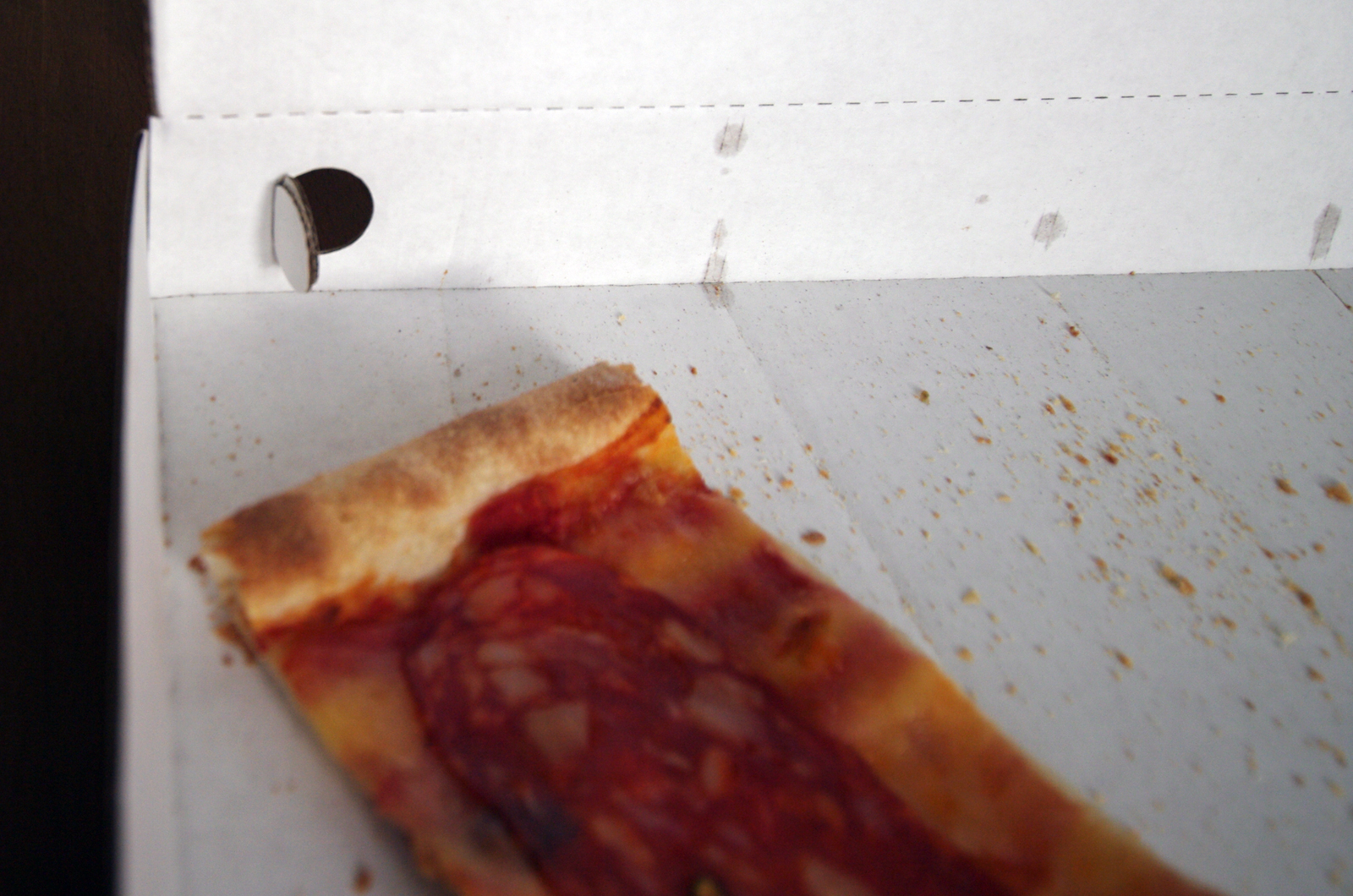
The opening on the side of the box allows some moisture and heat to evaporate.

The pizza box is supposed to allow the transport of a baked pizza with the minimum loss in quality possible. This means the box has two tasks to fulfill that are not easy to combine: On one hand, the box should insulate as well as possible against the cold air outside, the occasional wind and heat radiation, in order to keep the pizza warm. To reduce heat flow, the box has to close as firmly as possible to keep the warm air inside. Consumers consider a temperature between 70 and 85 °C (158 and 185 °F) to be ideal for pizza consumption. On the other hand, the box should keep the pizza from getting soggy, so that the crust and the covering are crisp on arrival. To ensure this, the condensation caused by the pizza must be let out (airing holes and some diffusion through the cardboard) or absorbed by the box. However, this results in the pizza getting cold. Pizza boxes made of single-wall corrugated board that are not equipped with additional insulation cool the transported pizza down too far after just ten minutes.

The oil in the pizza dough contaminates untreated corrugated cardboard, making it unsuitable for paper recycling. To prevent a change in the taste of the pizza through the material of the pizza box, and simultaneously to stop the cardboard from getting soggy, the pizza boxes have a thin coating of aluminum foil on the inside. Another possibility is to lay the pizza on either aluminum foil, a mixture of corrugated cardboard and blotting paper, or waxed paper. However, this changes the thermodynamic properties of the pizza box considerably. The pizza crust cannot give up any humidity downwards, meaning the layer beneath does not only impedes fat from trickling down but also steam.

== For pizza delivery ==
=== Pizza saver ===
In the US, many pizza boxes include a spacer made of heat-resistant plastic (usually polypropylene) placed in the middle of the pizza called the pizza saver (also known as "package saver", "box tent", "pizza table", or "pizza lid support"). This stops the box lid from touching the pizza and prevents cheese and toppings from sticking to the lid when it is being delivered. The pizza saver's origin goes back to a 1974 patent by Claudio Daniel Troglia. The pizza saver is often criticized for being a waste of resources as it is only used once and then thrown away.

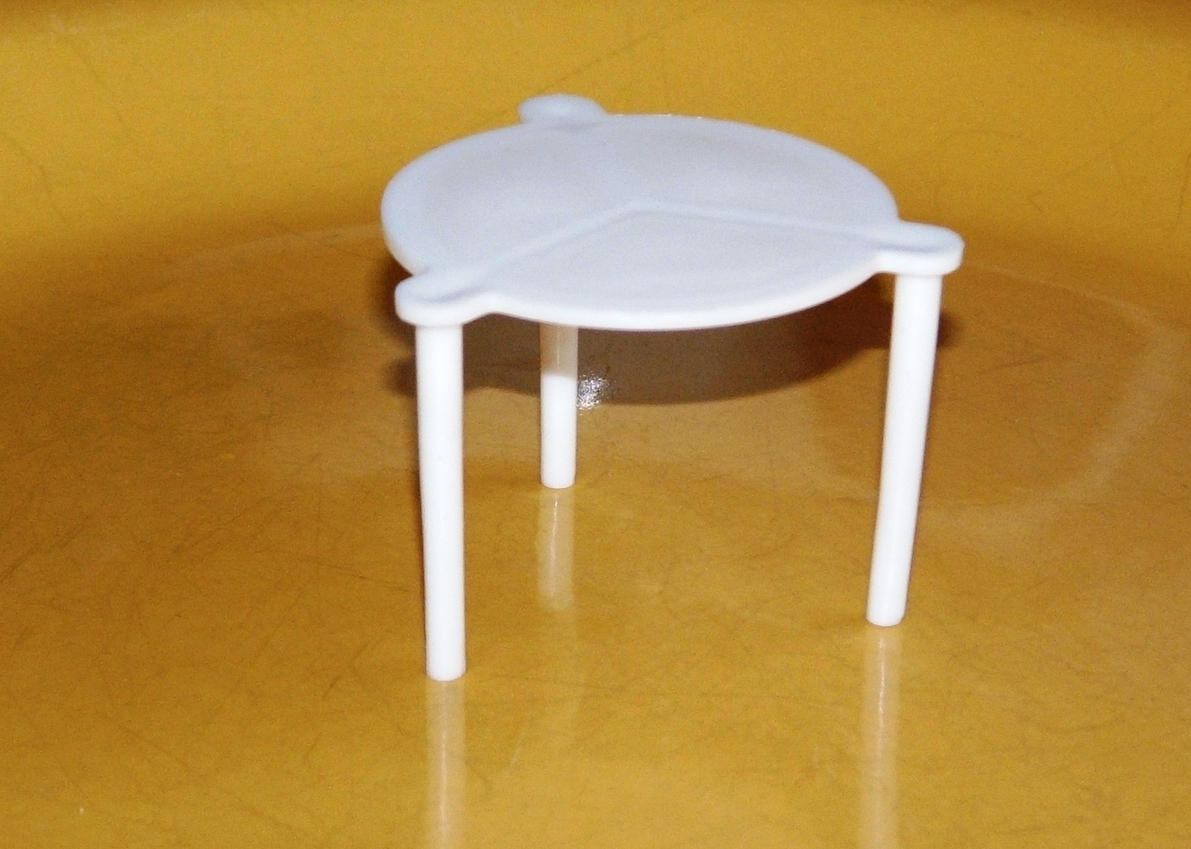
A pizza saver

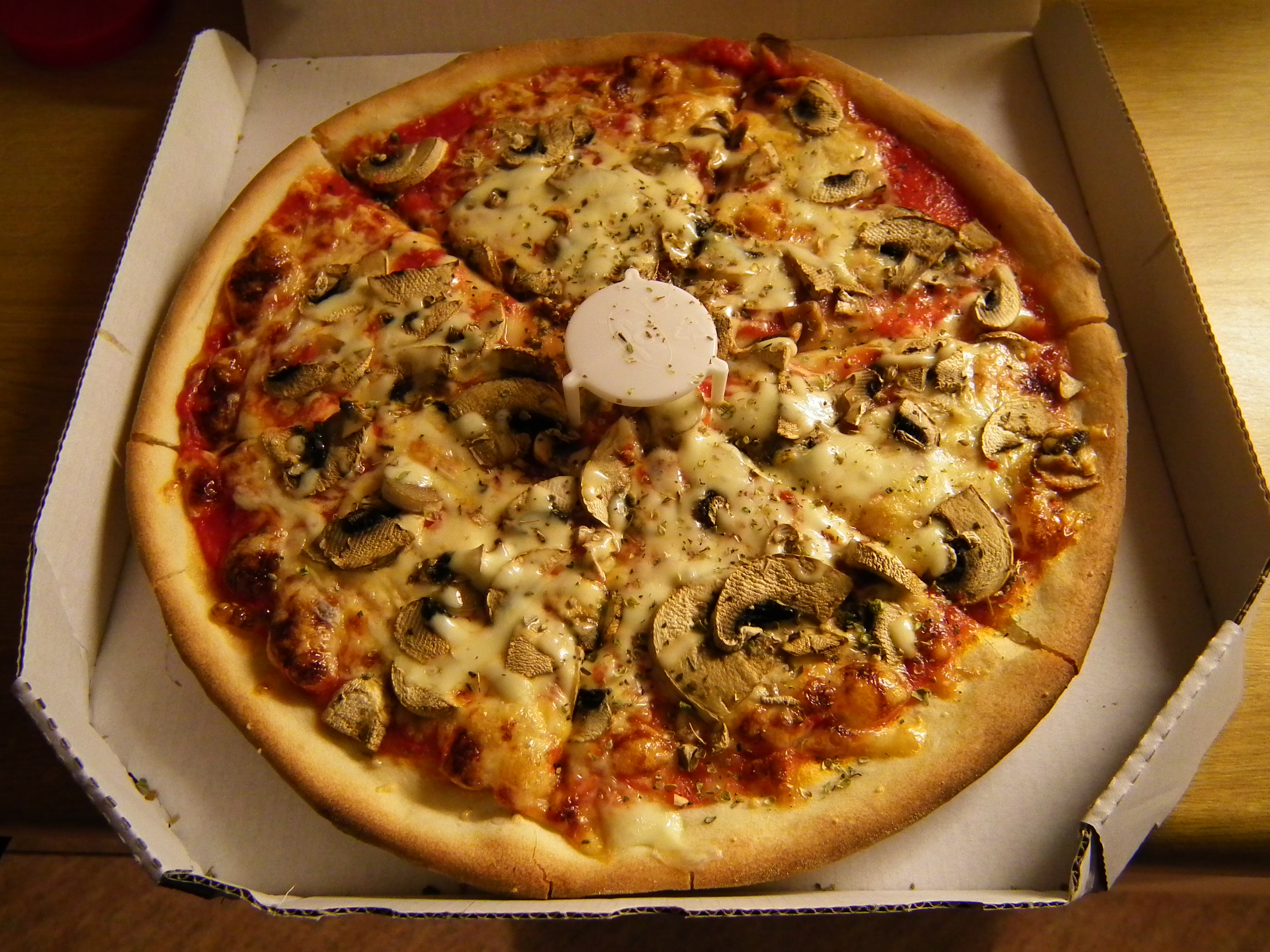
A pizza with a pizza saver

=== Bags and boxes for transport ===
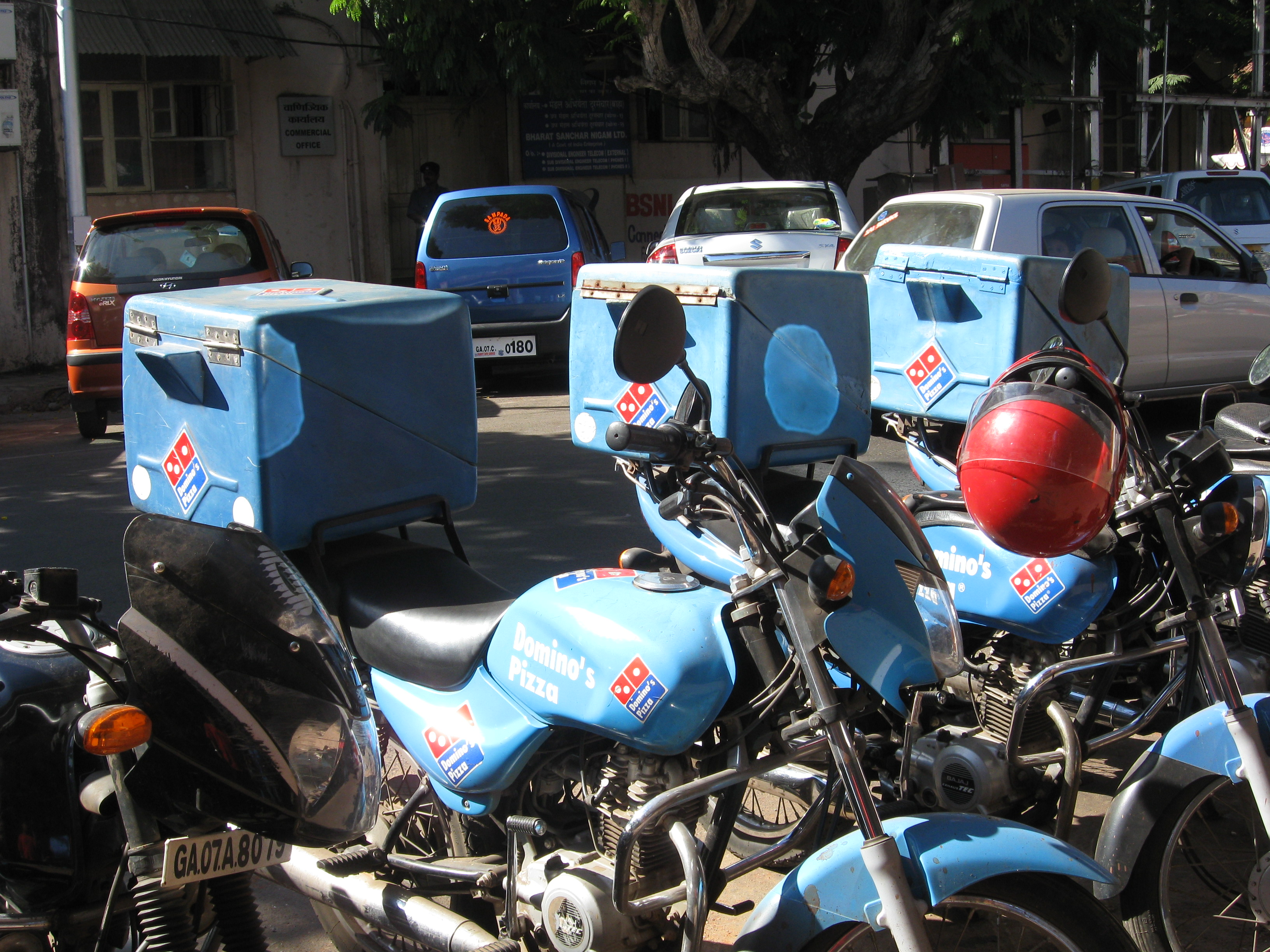
Domino's Pizza motor bikes that are used for pizza home delivery in Goa, India, with transport boxes mounted atop

There are special padded transport bags and boxes for delivery. Some of these bags can be heated in order to keep the temperature at the desired level. Mostly, they can either be plugged to a socket or powered by the 12 volt car battery. This means that the insulation of pizza boxes themselves is less important. Carry bags insulate best when their lid is connected to the rest of the bag on one side and the remaining three sides can be attached to lid by a zip. A bag can contain about three to five pizza boxes.

=== Pizza box with thermometer ===
The pizza boxes by Pizza Hut in Morocco and other countries have a thermometer indicator on the outside which color codes the temperature of the pizza inside. When the pizza is hot, the indicator shows the words "HOT" in red letters on a white background. However, if the temperature of the pizza goes below a certain value, the "Hot Dot" turns black and the words are no longer legible.

== Reuse and recycling ==
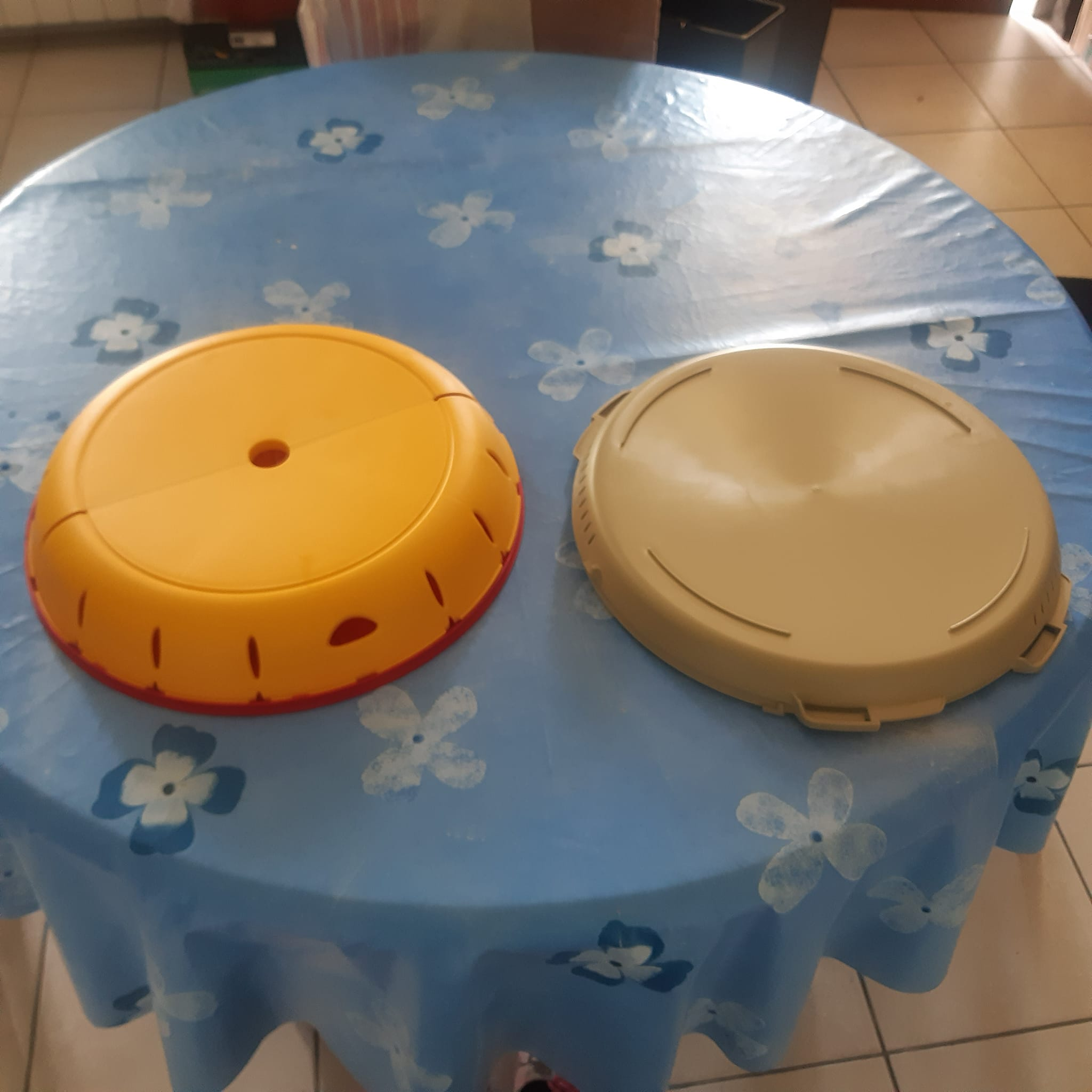
Recyclable plastic pizza boxes

One variation to the traditional corrugated pizza box is the reusable box. It is made out of recyclable plastic, is round or square has a variety of cover options with vents. They can be hand-washed, by dishwasher or commercial cleaning to be used over and over again. An advantage to this new variation is that there is no taste absorption from corrugated cardboard.

Another variation is biodegradable or compostable boxes mostly made out of sugarcane or bamboo or plant based materials. There are several variations in the marketplace as with their cardboard counterpart.

Most variations noted of pizza boxes support the same carry methods, stackable and nestable both unused and with enclosed pizza. There are no known differences when using a transport bag or warming bin. Where cardboard is usually delivered flat requiring 2 storage areas for unassembled and assembled boxes, most of the new variations only require a single storage area.

Some recycling facilities accept used pizza boxes while others do not. The grease and cheese are difficult to remove from the fibre and the resulting recycled paper has reduced strength. The effect is greater with heavy pizza contamination and with a higher percentage of pizza boxes in the recycling input.
