= Adam Kuban =

American blogger

Adam Kuban (born 1974 in Milwaukee, Wisconsin) was the editor and founding publisher of Slice NY, a weblog devoted to the subject of pizza. He was "one of the early single-subject food bloggers", according to Bloomberg. Raised in the suburbs of Kansas City, Kuban's father opened his own pizzeria in Kansas in the early 1980s but only lasted for a year and a half after Pizza Hut opened across the street. Kuban pursued a career in journalism, beginning as a copy editor for his college newspaper, the University Daily Kansan at the University of Kansas. He is also the founding publisher and current editor of A Hamburger Today, a similar weblog that reviews and analyzes trends in the hamburger world. In October 2006, Kuban sold Slice and A Hamburger Today to Serious Eats, a start-up food site founded by food writer Ed Levine that is focused on sharing food enthusiasm through blogs and online community. Kuban now serves as editor emeritus of Serious Eats.

After years into blogging Kuban quit and started making pizzas. He erected a pop-up called Margot's in Brooklyn which since permanently closed.
