= Grimaldi's Pizzeria =

American pizzeria chain

Coordinates: 40.70255°N 73.9933°W

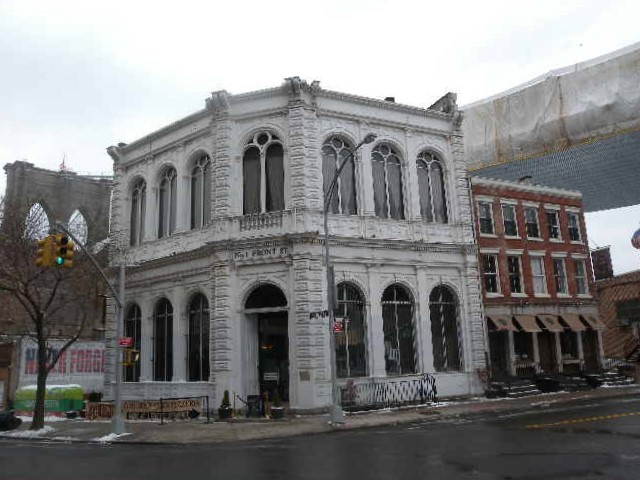
- One Front Street main location
- Interactive map of Grimaldi's Pizzeria

Restaurant information
- Established: 1990; 36 years ago
- Food type: Italian-American pizzeria
- Location: 1 Front St, Brooklyn, Kings, 11201, United States
- Other locations: Idaho, Nevada, Alabama, Arizona, Florida, Kansas, Kentucky, New York, South Carolina, Texas, Wisconsin
- Website: www.grimaldispizzeria.com

Grimaldi's Pizzeria is an American pizzeria chain from the New York City area with over 40 restaurants throughout the United States. Its most famous restaurant is under the Brooklyn Bridge in Brooklyn at 1 Front Street, next door to its original location. Zagat Survey rated Grimaldi's the No. 1 Pizzeria in New York in 2007. With a carry-out and delivery service model in response to the COVID-19 pandemic, in 2022 it had 43 restaurants in operation overall. Slices are sold at all locations except Brooklyn and Palazzo locations, which are cooked by coal-fired brick ovens. It also sells wines and appetizers, as well as calzones. Among desserts are cannoli and tiramisu, as well as New York–style cheesecake.

== History ==
=== Original ownership (1990–1994) ===
Patsy Grimaldi (1931-2025), the founder of Grimaldi's Pizzeria, learned to make coal-fired pizza at Patsy's Pizzeria, his uncle Patsy Lancieri's restaurant in Italian Harlem. He helped to support his family by working at the restaurant after his father died when he was 12, working his way up from busboy to coal oven apprentice, to waiter. Decades later, at age 57, Grimaldi decided to go into business for himself after noticing that an abandoned hardware store in Brooklyn was available to rent.

Grimaldi opened Grimaldi's Pizzeria in Brooklyn, New York, in 1990, in a location under the Brooklyn Bridge, at 19 Old Fulton Street in Brooklyn. It was named Patsy's Pizzeria, unassociated with the Patsy's Pizzeria in East Harlem where Grimaldi had previously worked as a teenager. Only selling pies, not slices, it became popular and expanded into Hoboken. It expanded to have two locations in New Jersey: both operated by Patsy Grimaldi's business partner Sean McHugh, in Hoboken and Verona, New Jersey. It became known for having lines around the block for people waiting to order. A jukebox played Frank Sinatra.

In 1996, there was a conflict over naming rights. I.O.B. Realty, then the owner of Patsy's Pizzeria in East Harlem, and Patsy Grimaldi's Patsy's Pizzeria in Brooklyn. I.O.B. sued Grimaldi so he would pay them for use of the name Patsy's. In October 1996, "to disassociate themselves from the new restaurants and to end the court fight, the Grimaldis changed the name of their pizza house to Patsy Grimaldi's. They replaced their signs and their awning. And they printed hand-held menus, removing the place mats that served as menus and that recounted—part seriously, part tongue-in-cheek—Mr. Grimaldi's quest to open his own parlor."

=== New owners and expansion (1995–2011) ===
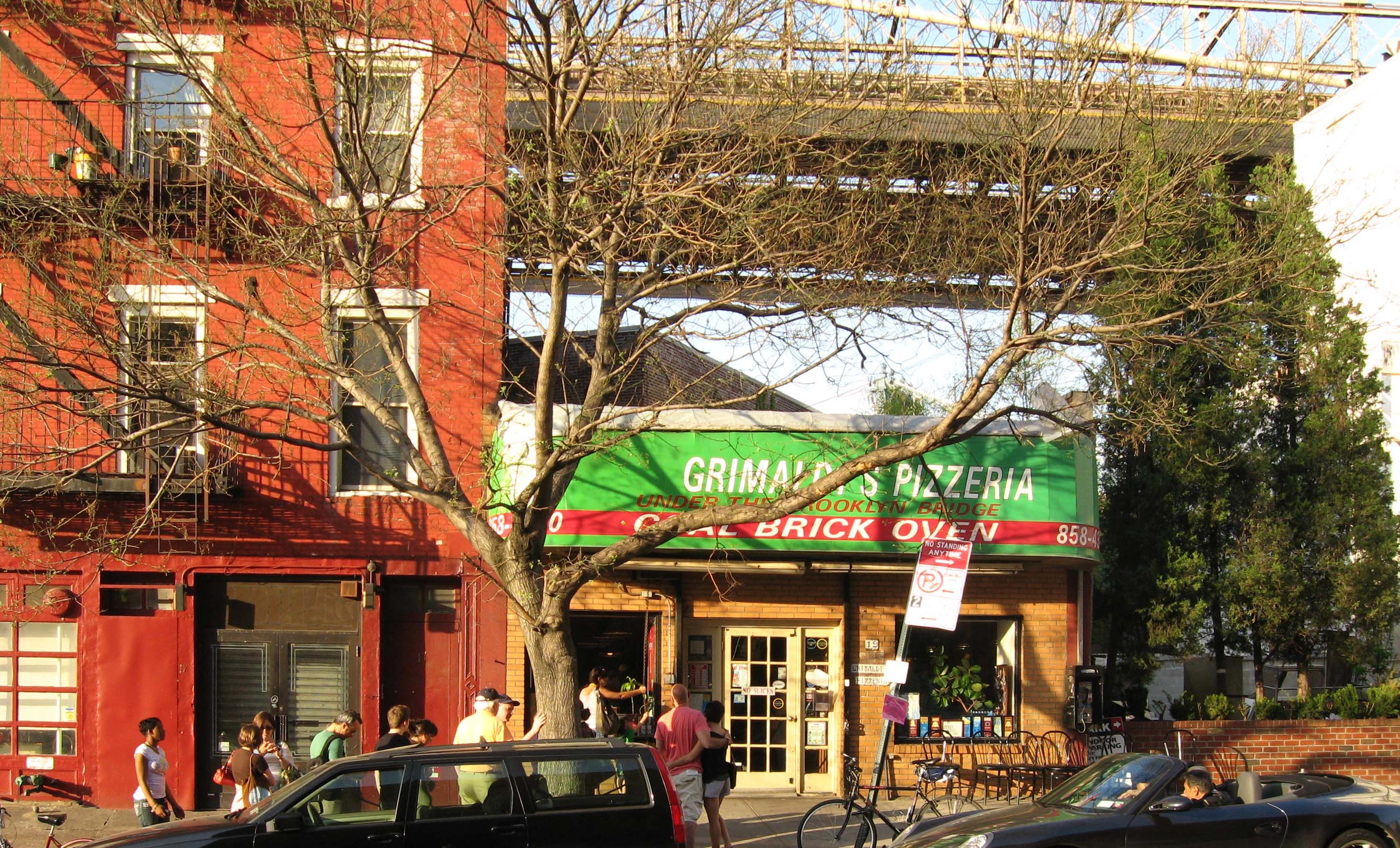
Customers waiting outside the original Grimaldi's Pizzeria. As Grimaldi's does not take reservations, lines for tables are often long and extend far up Old Fulton Street.

In the late 1990s, Patsy Grimaldi retired, selling the Grimaldi's name and franchise (except for the Hoboken locations) to restaurateur Frank Ciolli. In 2000, Ciolli's son Joseph became CEO. Ciolli and Greenwald opened a new outlet in Tempe, Arizona, then moved headquarters to Scottsdale. In 2003, wait-times at the original Brooklyn restaurant, which didn't take reservations, could be up to an hour for a table. By 2008, it had expanded into Dallas. By 2010, the company had expanded into Arizona, Florida, and Texas. That year, the BBC named it as one of the best pizza restaurants in the United States. In 2010, after the 2009 announcement that a possible Grimaldi's in the Financial District had been dormant for a year and might be evicted, the store signed on to open a new 24-hour branch in the Limelight Marketplace in Manhattan. There were also plans to re-open 135 John Street.

In July 2008, the restaurant was briefly seized and shut down by tax authorities. In 2010, Grimaldi's Brooklyn location was facing eviction, with the case going to court. In 2011, the building's owner declined to renew Ciolli's lease in Brooklyn, so he renovated an abandoned bank next door and moved the restaurant over: the landlord attempted to evict the original location for falling behind on rent and taxes, but a judge ordered the landlord to keep the location open until the lease expired on November 30, 2011. The location closed on November 29, opening the next day at 1 Front Street next door, a building opened in 1869 that had served as the first safety deposit bank in Brooklyn. Also in 2011, a Grimaldi's outpost in Chelsea, Manhattan, was opened. In 2012, Patsy Grimaldi came out of retirement and opened a new pizzeria called Juliana's Pizza in the original building that Grimaldi's had been evicted from in 2011, resulting in enmity between himself and Ciolli.

=== Growth and franchising (2012–2018) ===
Grimaldi's expanded into Southern California in early 2013, in a location in El Segundo with 280 seats. It was reported that a chemist had been hired to make the water taste similar to the city water in Brooklyn. By 2017, Eric Greenwald was chief operating officer of Grimaldi's Pizza. That year, they opened a location in Detroit, while it had 50 stores overall. Also in 2017, the company signed a contract to open five stores in partnership with Tablez Food Co. to open five stores in the United Arab Emirates.

In August 2016, a Grimaldi's at 656 Avenue of the Americas in Chelsea was seized by New York's tax department over back taxes. The location, which had previously closed for the same reason, closed again in 2018. In February 2018, a Grimaldi's pizzeria closed in Colorado due to tax debt and the Coloradoan reported that Grimaldi's Coal Brick-Oven Pizzeria at Foothills shopping center had had its property seized by the county government, after it had closed the month prior. The overall company, earlier that year, had opened its 50th US location, with restaurants in 16 states.

=== Pandemic and delivery (2019–2022) ===
Grimaldi's Pizzeria started a national domestic franchise program in April 2019. The franchising, however, was put on pause during the start of the coronavirus pandemic. In May 2020, Entrepreneur reported that Grimaldi's had pivoted entirely to a carry-out and delivery service model in response to the pandemic. The historic Brooklyn location, which had never offered delivery, began using delivery partnerships with other companies in early 2020, and an area was created for outdoor seating when patio dining was opened up by New York City. By later that year, the company had again started offering dine-in service in New York.

In November 2020, the Grimaldi’s Pizzeria To-Go concept debuted in Scottsdale, Arizona, in conjunction with Kitchen United. Again focusing on franchising deals, in 2021, it was announced that Grimaldi's was partnering with Power Brands Hospitality Group and opening a new location in Huntsville, Alabama, their first in the state. It was Grimaldi's first domestic franchising deal. At the time, Joseph Ciolli was CEO of Grimaldi's and the company had locations in South Carolina and Florida, as well as "to-go" locations in New York along with its primary Brooklyn location. In October 2021, the company continued to expand in Austin, Texas, with a full-service location after previously opening "to-go" locations.

As of 2022, during the COVID-19 pandemic, there were active locations in Meridian, Idaho, as well as Sparks, Nevada, and others in Alabama, Arizona, Florida, Kansas, Kentucky, New York, South Carolina, Texas, and Wisconsin. According to its website, the company overall had 41 company locations in the United States in ten states, and the company stated it was looking to expand internationally, stating it had 43 restaurants in operation overall. All the locations "re-create the Brooklyn location" and import ingredients from the same suppliers.

There are satellite kitchens in cities such as Frisco, Texas, for example the Grimaldi’s Pizzeria To-Go at Kitchen United MIX.

== Menu ==
The company traditionally does both carry-out and in-restaurant dining. Restaurants feature New York Italian decoration, with a coal-brick oven displayed centrally so patrons can see pizza being cooked through a glass partition. The ovens are "heated by 100 pounds of coal per day at a temperature of up to 1,200 degrees." During the pandemic in 2020, the company ceased in-restaurant dining in its over 40 locations, instead delivering via DoorDash, UberEats, and Grubhub, and creating separate carry-out areas to allow for social distancing. The menu remained the same, but deals were added to allow bundling of alcohol and family discounts. Dine-in had been re-added to some locations by 2020.

In 2010, the company had hired "chemists to analyze and recreate the mineral content and composition of New York water," and that a "custom water system simulating New York water' is installed in every Grimaldi's Pizzeria to ensure that the dough tastes as authentically New York as possible."

According to the Las Vegas Review-Journal, Grimaldi's crust is known for being thin and "cracker-crispy," explaining "its cheese and sauce do not drip with olive oil" like other New York establishments that used the oil to keep the pizza from burning when reheated. Grimaldi's pizza, on the other hand, can't be reheated or it chars. As such, takeout pies are only cooked two-thirds of the way, with customers instructed to finish cooking at home.

As of 2022, menu items included coal brick-oven pizza, with styles including traditional, pesto, and white with garlic. Pizza sizes included 12", 16", and 18", and calzones are sold in the same sizes. There is also a 12" cauliflower pizza, starters and appetizers, wine and drinks, and the company's own vintage of Italian pinot grigio. Among deserts are cannoli and tiramisu, as well as New York–style cheesescake. The Las Vegas Sun described it as having a "crispy, chewy crust dotted with homemade pesto, roasted red peppers and the best fresh mozzarella in town... other gourmet toppings include kalamata olives, Italian sausage, ricotta cheese and artichoke hearts."

== Accolades ==
Wrote The New Yorker in 2003: "Best-pizza arguments may be as tedious as they are futile—there’s the Patsy’s contingent, the Grimaldi’s contingent, and those lucky few who claim to know the exact identity of Original Ray." Writes The Washington Post, the restaurant in 2003 "regularly wins best-pizza-in-New York surveys. Pizza, in fact, is all it serves, except for an antipasto for $10 (mozzarella, salami, roasted peppers and olives) and a few excellent desserts. You can get a small plain pizza for $12 and a large for $14. Most toppings are $2. Truth is, you don't go to Grimaldi's for the toppings, which were more than adequate. You go for the crust, which was incomparable on our visit: thin and crunchy, almost delicate in its lightness."

Grimaldi's Pizzeria was one of the most acclaimed pizzerias in New York City. In March 2010, the Gothamist reported that in a visit to the Brooklyn pizzeria, Michelle Obama had "basically" said the pizza was superior to Chicago-style pizza.

Zagat Survey rated Grimaldi's the No. 1 Pizzeria in New York in 2007. It was named one of the top 10 restaurants in New York by Let's Do New York City. Grimaldi's Pizzeria was chosen as one of the five best pizzerias in United States by the Food Network. Its pizza was featured on the television show The Best Of....

== Separate chains ==
There are two independently-operated Grimaldi's chains throughout the United States, each with legal rights to the name:

- The more well-known chain of Grimaldi’s Pizzeria restaurants, operated by Joseph Ciolli, runs over 45 locations and includes the original Brooklyn Bridge location and also has locations in Alabama, Arizona, Florida, Iowa, Idaho, Kansas, Kentucky, Nevada, South Carolina, Texas and Wisconsin.
- Two more locations, operated by former Patsy Grimaldi partner Sean McHugh, are located in Hoboken and Verona, New Jersey.

== Pop culture ==
The location was featured in an episode of Law and Order.

== See also ==
- Pizza in the United States
- List of pizza chains of the United States
- List of restaurants in New York City
- Food Wars (American TV series)
