= John's of Bleecker Street =

Pizzeria in Manhattan, New York

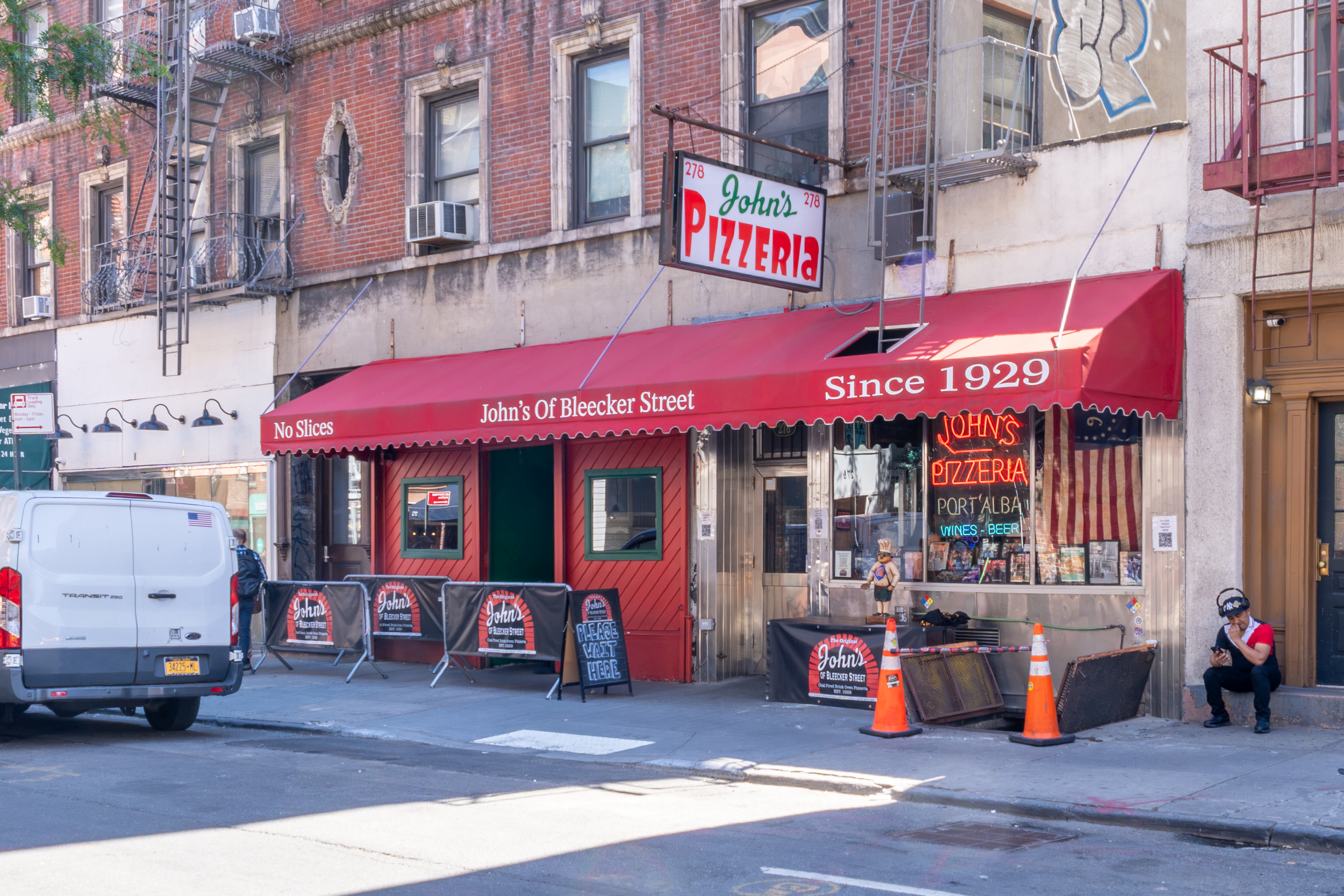
- Bleecker Street (2026)
- Interactive map of John's of Bleecker Street

Restaurant information
- Established: 1915
- Owners: Peter Castellotti Sr. Robert "Bob" Vittoria
- Previous owners: Filippo Milone; John Sasso; Rose Vesce and Augustine "Chubby" Vesce
- Food type: Italian-American pizzeria
- Location: 278 Bleecker Street, Manhattan, New York City, New York, 10014, United States
- Coordinates: 40°43′54″N 74°00′12″W
- Website: www.johnsofbleecker.com

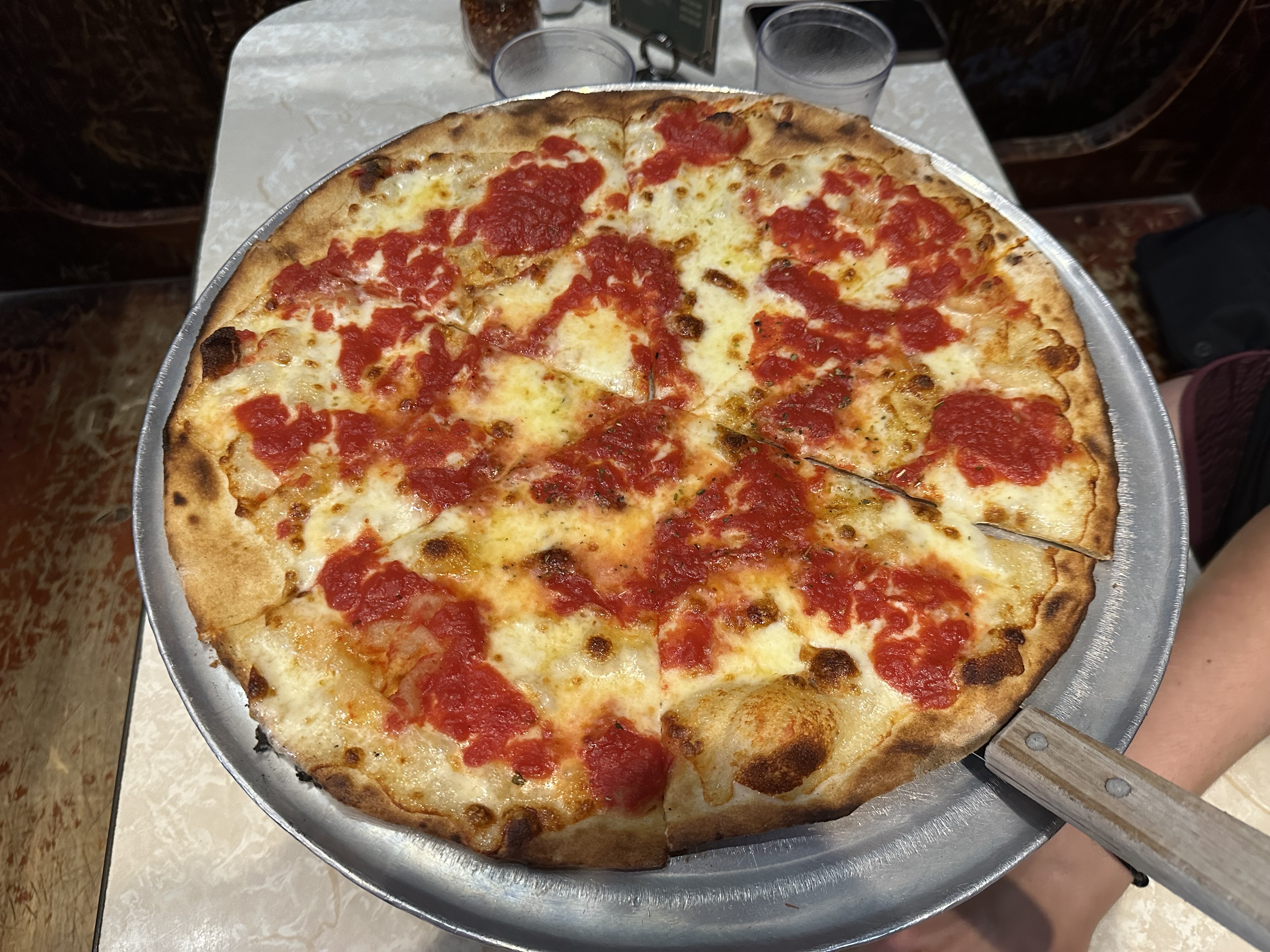
The "John's Original" pizza

John's of Bleecker Street, simply known as John's Pizzeria, is a historic pizzeria on Bleecker Street in the Greenwich Village neighborhood of Manhattan in New York City. Founded in 1915, the pizzeria serves coal fired brick oven pizza prepared in the style of a tomato pie. In 2015, it was ranked the 10th best pizzeria in the United States by TripAdvisor.

John's is known for its graffiti-carved wooden booths where any patron can carve their name. The pizzeria does not serve slices, only whole pies cooked in an 850 °F (454 °C) oven, along with calzones, and accepted only cash until May 2016, when it began accepting credit cards.

== History ==
John's was believed to be founded in 1929 by John Sasso when it was originally located on Sullivan Street in Greenwich Village. However, documents show the pizzeria was actually opened in 1915 by Filippo Milone. John Sasso, who was related by marriage, took over in 1925.

In 1953, Sasso sold the restaurant to his relatives, Augustine and Joe Vesce. In the early 1980s, the business was purchased by the Vesce's nephew, Bob Vittoria, who had worked there as a teenager, and his business partner, Peter Castellotti.

Castellotti's ex-wife Madeline left her job as a personnel director of Cadwalader, Wickersham & Taft, a Manhattan law firm, to open a John's Pizzeria in the eighties on the Upper West Side. She opened John's Pizzeria on Times Square in 1994. In 1993, Bob Vittoria became the majority partner of John's Pizzeria on Bleecker.

== Critical reception ==
John's has been highly rated throughout its operation. As of 2011, Adam Kuban of Serious Eats considered it an NYC Quintessential pizza for connoisseurs.

== See also ==
- List of Italian restaurants
- List of restaurants in New York City
