= Pizza by the slice =

Fast food sold by pizzerias

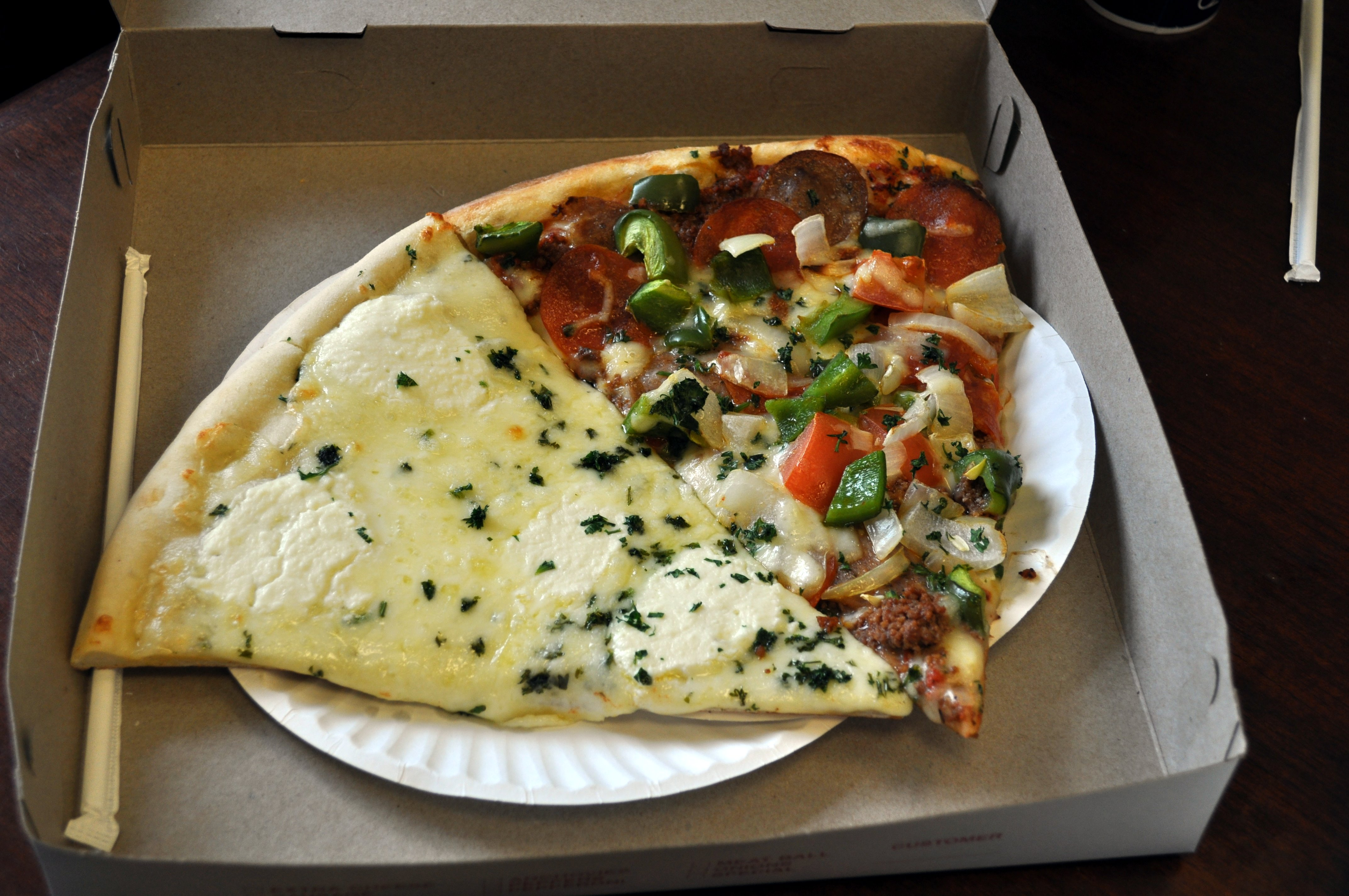
Pizza by the slice in a pizza box for take-out

Pizza by the slice is pizza sold in individual portions as a fast food by a restaurant or street vendor. Some restaurants and pizza stands only sell pizza by the slice, while others sell both slices and whole pizzas. The jumbo slice is a large-sized slice of New York–style pizza made in areas of Washington, D.C. Pizza al taglio is a style of rectangular slice of pizza that originated in Rome and is typically sold by weight.

== Overview ==
Some pizzerias and food stands sell pizza by the slice and whole pizza pies, and some only sell slices. Pizza by the slice is typically pre-baked and pre-sliced, and is characteristically kept warm under heat lamps. Slices are sometimes re-heated or have toppings added before going back into the oven briefly. Selling pizza by the slice offers an economic and speedy dining option to a purchaser while optimizing profits for the seller, as the total value of a pie's slices typically is considerably more than selling a whole pie. The price of pizza slices is also typically significantly less than the cost of a whole pie.

Pizza by the slice is prevalent in the United States. There are over 1,000 pizzerias and "slice shops" in New York City selling New York–style pizza by the slice, with Sicilian pizza slices also often available. It is a common street food, and the most popular way pizza is ordered. There is a lively competition for the pizzeria that sells the best slice in the city.

Pizza by the slice is also manufactured frozen, and is sometimes packaged in individual microwavable portions.

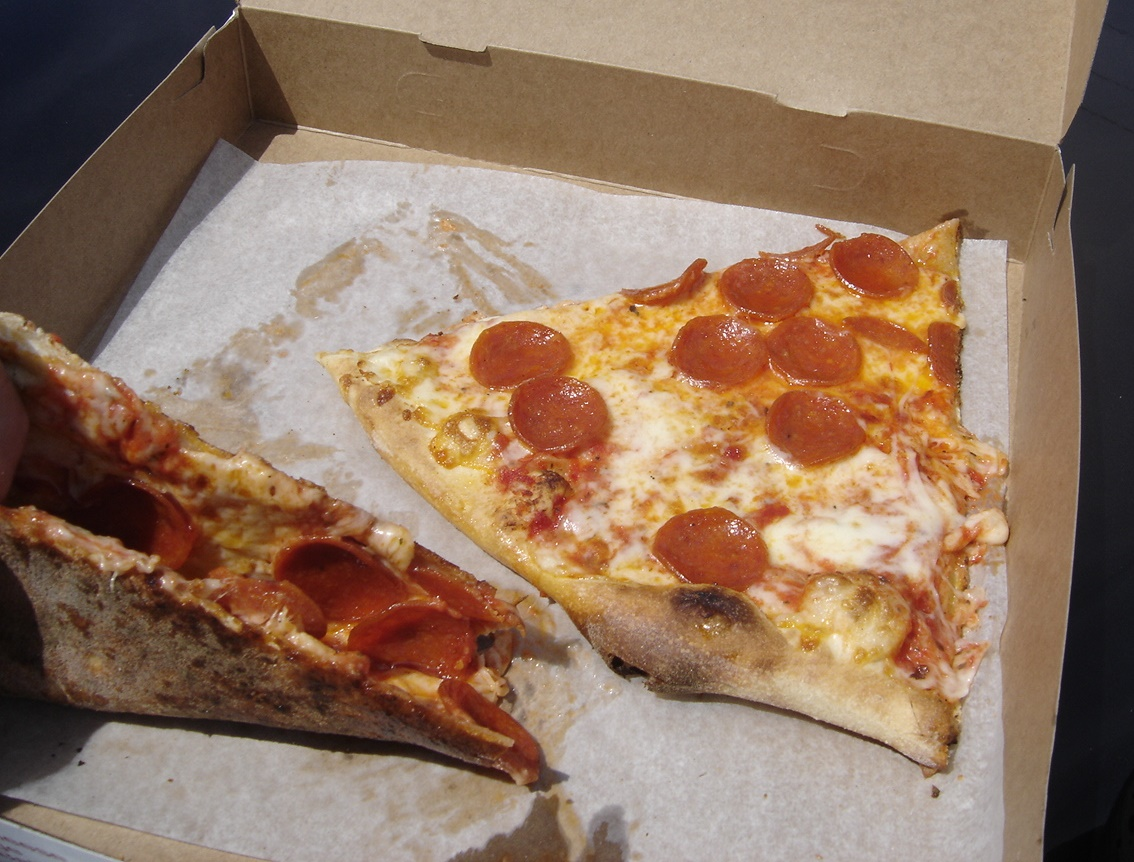
New York–style pepperoni pizza, displaying its characteristic thin foldable crust

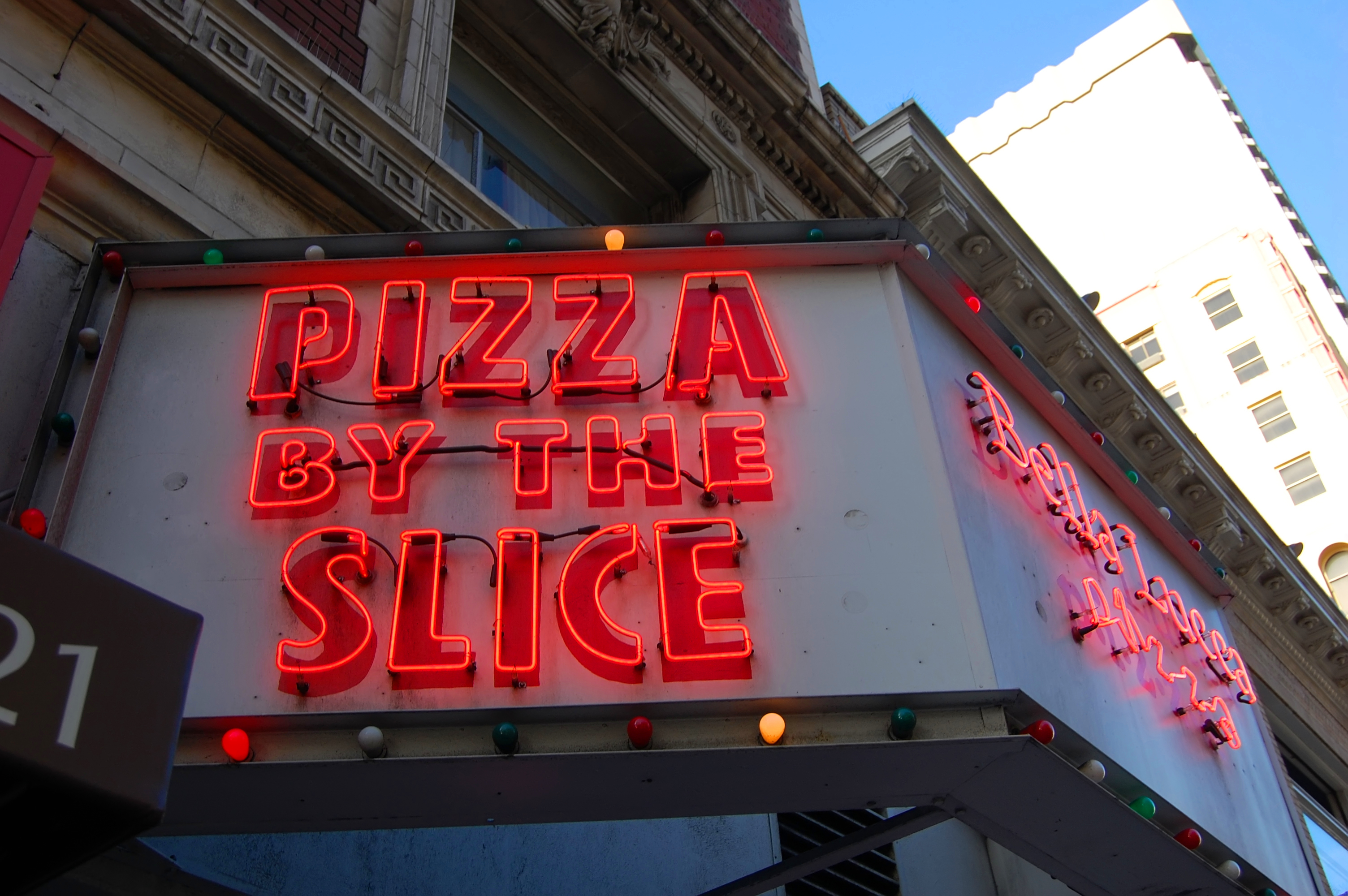
A sign for pizza by the slice at a restaurant in San Francisco, California

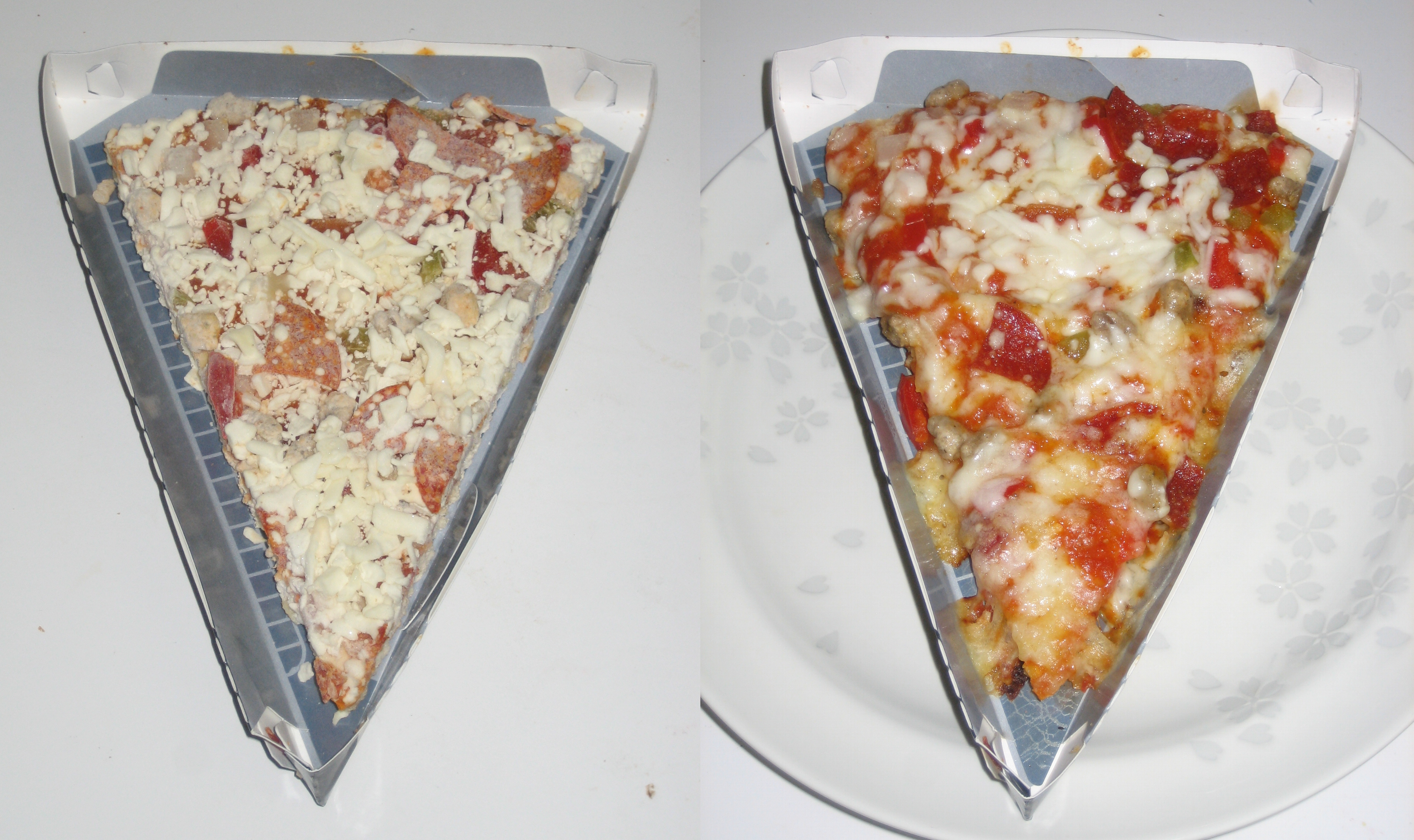
Red Baron brand frozen pizza by the slice, uncooked and cooked

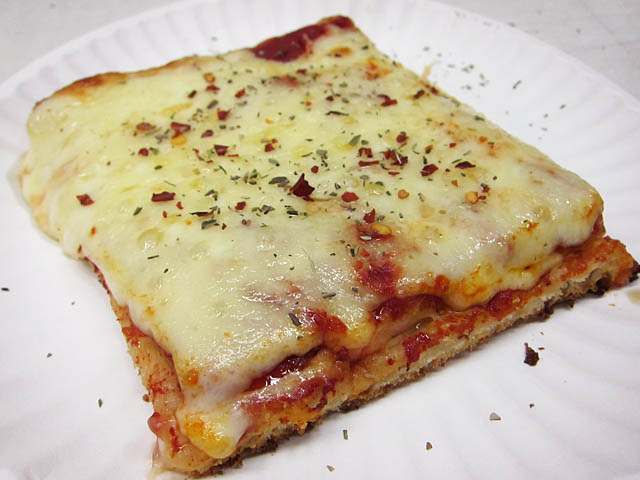
A slice of Sicilian pizza

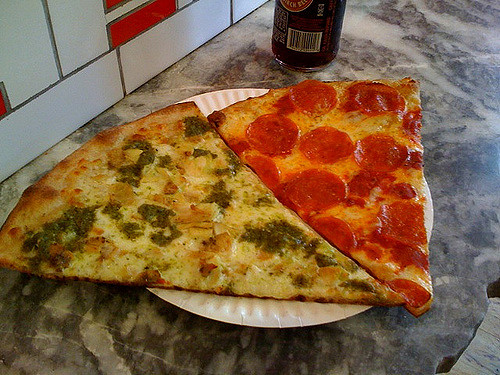
Slices of New York–style pizza, chicken pesto on the left, pepperoni on the right

== Jumbo slice ==
The jumbo slice is an oversized slice of New York–style pizza sold in areas of Washington, D.C., especially favored as a late-night snack by bargoers after closing time.

== Pizza al taglio ==
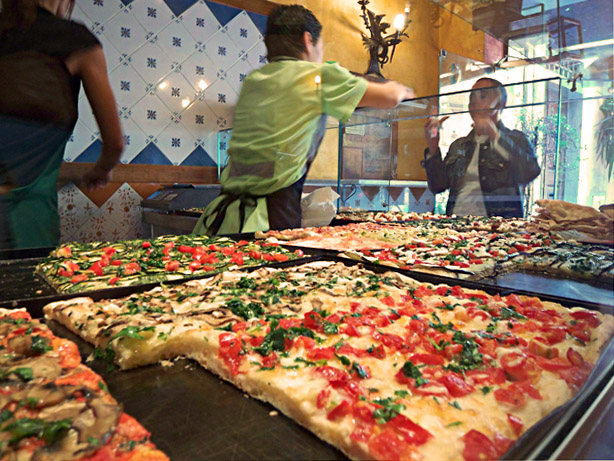
Pizza al taglio in Rome, Italy

Pizza al taglio is an Italian pizza variety of rectangular pizza that is sold by the slice, typically by weight. The dish originated in Rome, Italy, and is common there, as well as being sold elsewhere around the world. The dough for pizza al taglio is sometimes parbaked ahead of time, allowing sauce and various toppings to be added later and the pie finished quickly in the oven when needed.

== See also ==
Media related to Slices of pizza at Wikimedia Commons

- List of street foods
- Pizzetta – small pizza
