= Lombardi's Pizza =

Coordinates: 40.72155°N 73.995624°W

Lombardi's

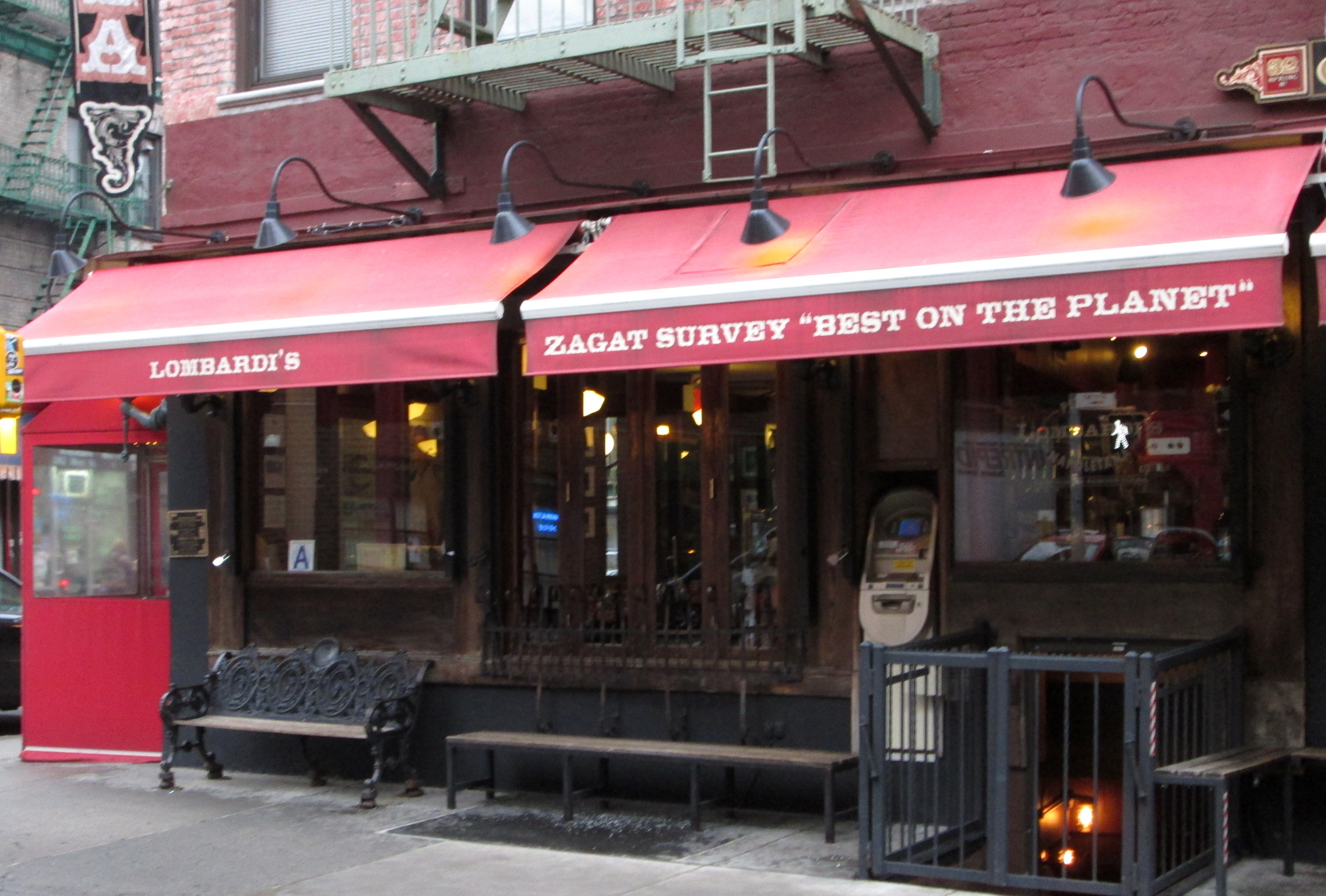
- Storefront in February 2013
- Interactive map of Lombardi's

Restaurant information
- Established: 1905; 121 years ago
- Food type: Italian–American pizzeria
- Location: 32 Spring Street (corner of Mott Street), New York City, New York, 10012, United States
- Website: firstpizza.com

Lombardi's is a pizzeria at 32 Spring Street on the corner of Mott Street in the Nolita neighborhood of Manhattan in New York City. Opened in 1905, it has been recognized by the Pizza Hall of Fame as the first pizzeria in the United States, though later research has shown other pizzerias that predate it by more than a decade.

== History ==
It was believed that Italian immigrant Gennaro Lombardi started the business in 1897 as a grocery store at 53½ Spring Street, and began selling "tomato pies" (in which the cheese is put down first then covered by tomato sauce) wrapped in paper and tied with a string at lunchtime to workers from the area's factories. As the story went, in 1905 Lombardi received a business license to operate a pizzeria restaurant, and soon had a clientele that included Italian tenor Enrico Caruso, and later passed the business on to his son, George. However, in 2019, suspicion was raised about whether Gennaro Lombardi was the true founder, after a search of his birth record, naturalization papers, and other supporting documents show he first came to America in November 1904 at age 17, classified as a "laborer." If he became involved with the pizzeria at 53½ Spring Street in 1905, it was as an employee, not as an owner. Research suggests Filippo Milone opened the pizzeria.

In 1984, the original Lombardi's closed, but reopened 10 years later a block away at 30 and 32 Spring Street, run by Gennaro Lombardi III, Gennaro Lombardi's grandson, and his childhood friend John Brescio. This hiatus and location change surrendered the title of America's longest continually operating pizzeria to Papa's Tomato Pies in Trenton, New Jersey, which opened in 1912 and has sold pies without interruption since. Brescio was named a captain in the Genovese crime family by law enforcement in 2017.

The owners chose the Spring Street location because it had a coal fired oven. When Lombardi's business suffered in the early days of the COVID-19 pandemic in the 2020s, Lombardi ended its lease at 30 Spring Street (although it maintained the location at 32 Spring Street), and the new owner of the building destroyed the coal oven.

In 2005, Lombardi's offered entire pizzas for 5 cents, their 1905 price, to commemorate the 100th anniversary of the first pizza sold at its original location. They did this promotion again in 2015 for the 110th anniversary.

== See also ==
- List of restaurants in New York City
