= Pizzeria =

Restaurant that sells pizza

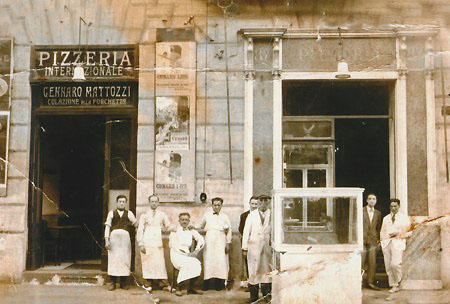
A pizzeria with its staff along Via Depretis in Naples c. 1910

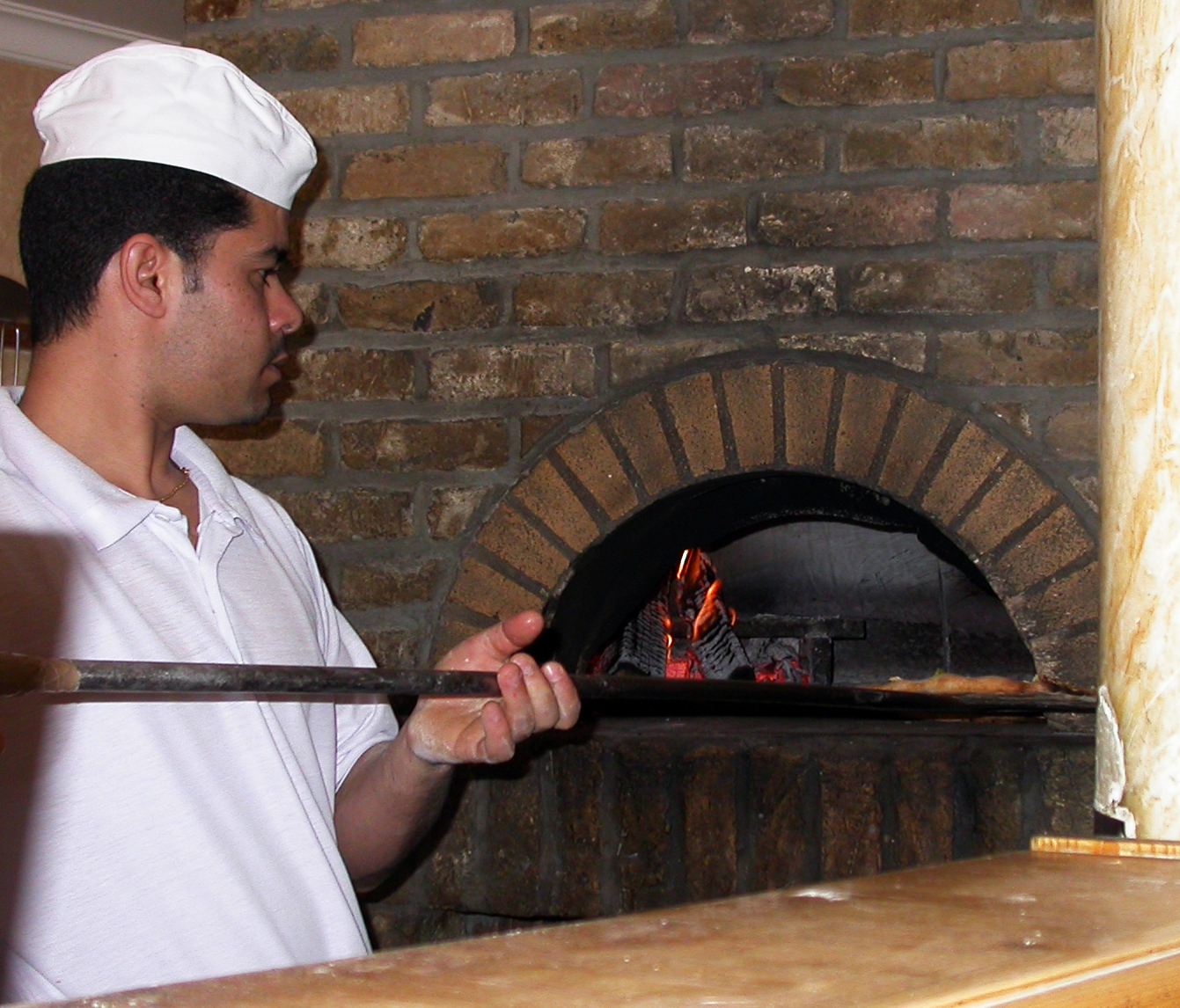
A pizza chef baking pizza in a pizza oven

A pizzeria (Italian: [ˌpitːseˈriːa]) is a commercial establishment specializing in the preparation and sale of pizza. It may offer take-away, where the customer orders their food either in advance or at the restaurant and then takes the prepared food with them in a pizza box. A pizzeria may deliver food to the customer's home.

== History ==
One of the world's first pizzerias was founded in Naples by Raffaele Esposito in 1830. The restaurant, now known as Pizzeria Brandi still operates to this day.

The origin of the pizzeria in the United States has been attributed to Italian immigrant Gennaro Lombardi who opened a pizzeria in 1905. In the United States, sales of pizza started in 1905, when Gennaro Lombardi installed a pizza oven in his shop-café and started selling pizza by the slice.

== Types ==
=== Pizzeria-restaurant ===
A pizzeria is a type of restaurant that serves pizza with other dishes, including calzones and various fried foods. Customers order from a menu and are served at the table by a waiter. The chef is assisted by a pizzaiolo, who operates the oven and prepares the pizza. It is generally served al piatto, although some establishments offer pizza al metro. Al piatto pizza is also sold for takeaway (take-out).

=== Takeaway pizzeria ===
Smaller than a pizzeria-restaurant, it is a venue where pizza is purchased for consumption at home. Pizza may also be eaten on-site, at counters or tables provided inside the establishment. Takeaway pizzerias often have a refrigerator from which customers can also purchase beverages.

=== Fast food ===
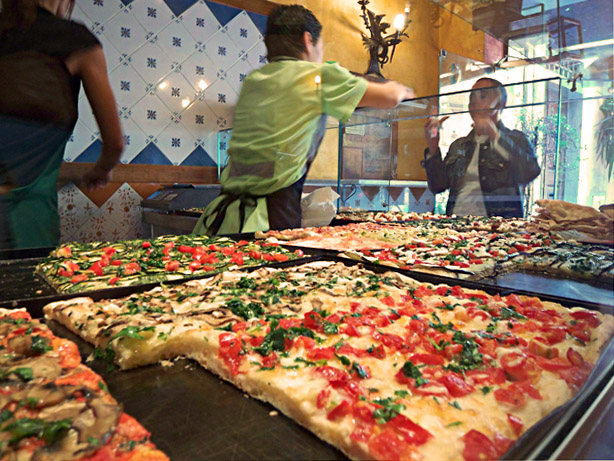
Pizza al taglio for sale in Rome, Italy

In the late 20th century, the concept of fast food caused changes in pizza sales. Food stands offering pizza al taglio (lit. 'pizza by the slice') started appearing in Italy, baking large rectangular pizzas sold in small slices. These slices are seldom topped with more than two ingredients, not counting tomato and cheese.

==== Fast food chains ====
There are also fast food chains that combine speed of service with the widespread consumption of pizza.

=== Take and bake pizzeria ===
Take-and-bake pizzas are typically made to order out of fresh ingredients (though the pizzeria may also keep a number of commonly ordered or special sale price pizzas on hand for convenience). Often because the pizzas are made with fresh and unbaked ingredients and not heated in-store, the pizzas can be paid for in some states with food assistance EBT cards.

According to Nation's Restaurant News, take-and-bake pizzerias typically have lower costs because they require less restaurant space and equipment. As a result, they are often able to undercut the national pizza giants.

Pizza is also sold in rosticcerie, bakeries, delicatessens, and hypermarkets.

== Home delivery ==
Home delivery is equally widespread and is sometimes used as a form of advertising; discount vouchers may accompany deliveries as promotional offers. In many countries, a delivery charge and tip is added to the bill. In Italy, it’s usually around one Euro. Delivery generally takes place using small vehicles such as scooters, equipped with special storage boxes.

Pizza delivery by motorcycle inspired the video game Radikal Bikers.

== See also ==
- Trattoria
