= List of pizzerias in New York City =

This is a list of notable pizzerias in New York City, organized by borough. Pizza is considered a culinary staple of New York City, where it is sold by the slice as well as by pie.

== Manhattan ==
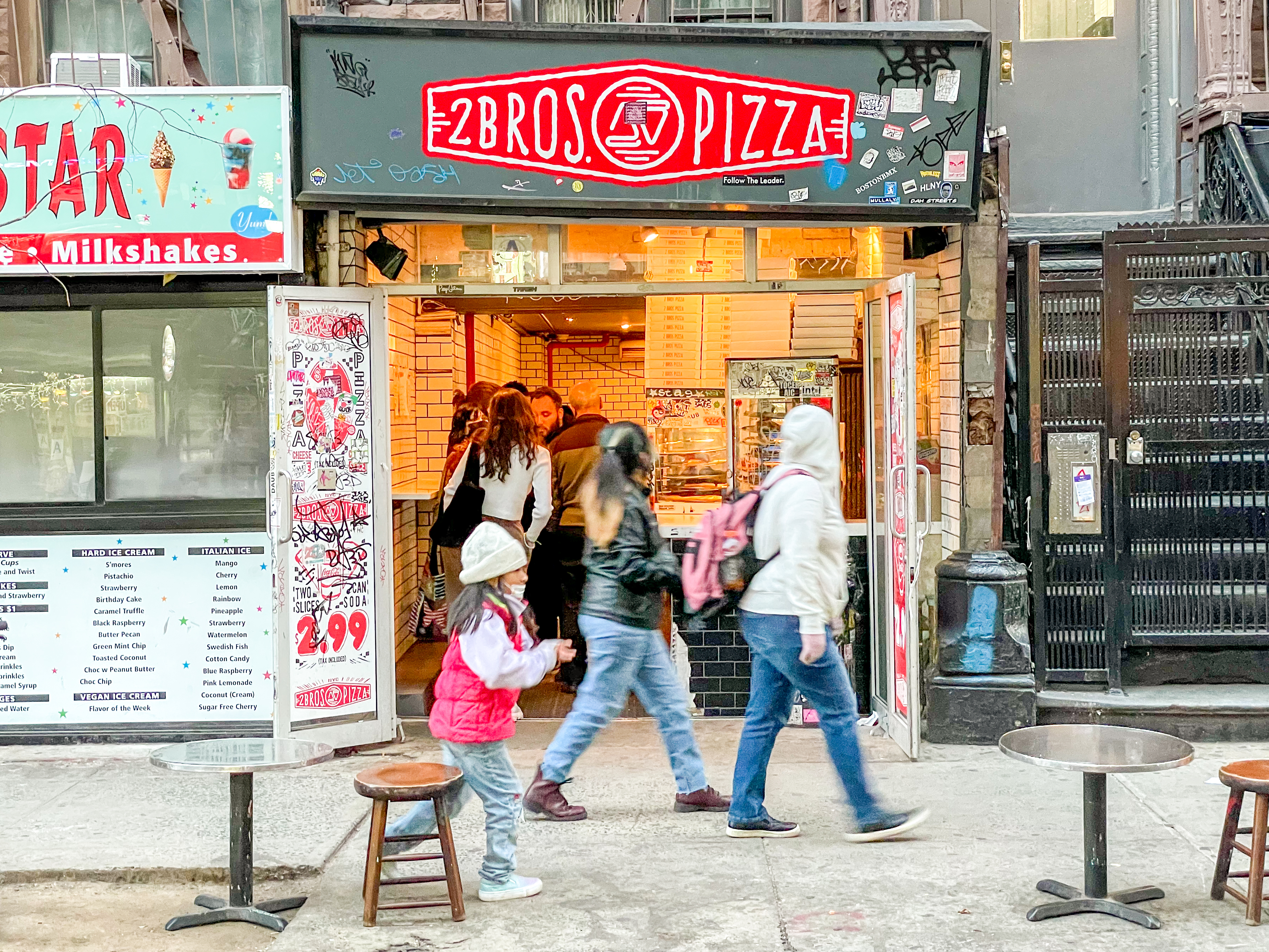
2 Bros. Pizza

- 2 Bros. Pizza
- Joe's Pizza
- John's of Bleecker Street
- Kesté
- Lombardi's
- NY Pizza Suprema
- Patsy's Pizzeria
- Ray's Pizza
- Sbarro
- Scarr's
- Two Boots
- Una Pizza Napoletana

== Brooklyn ==
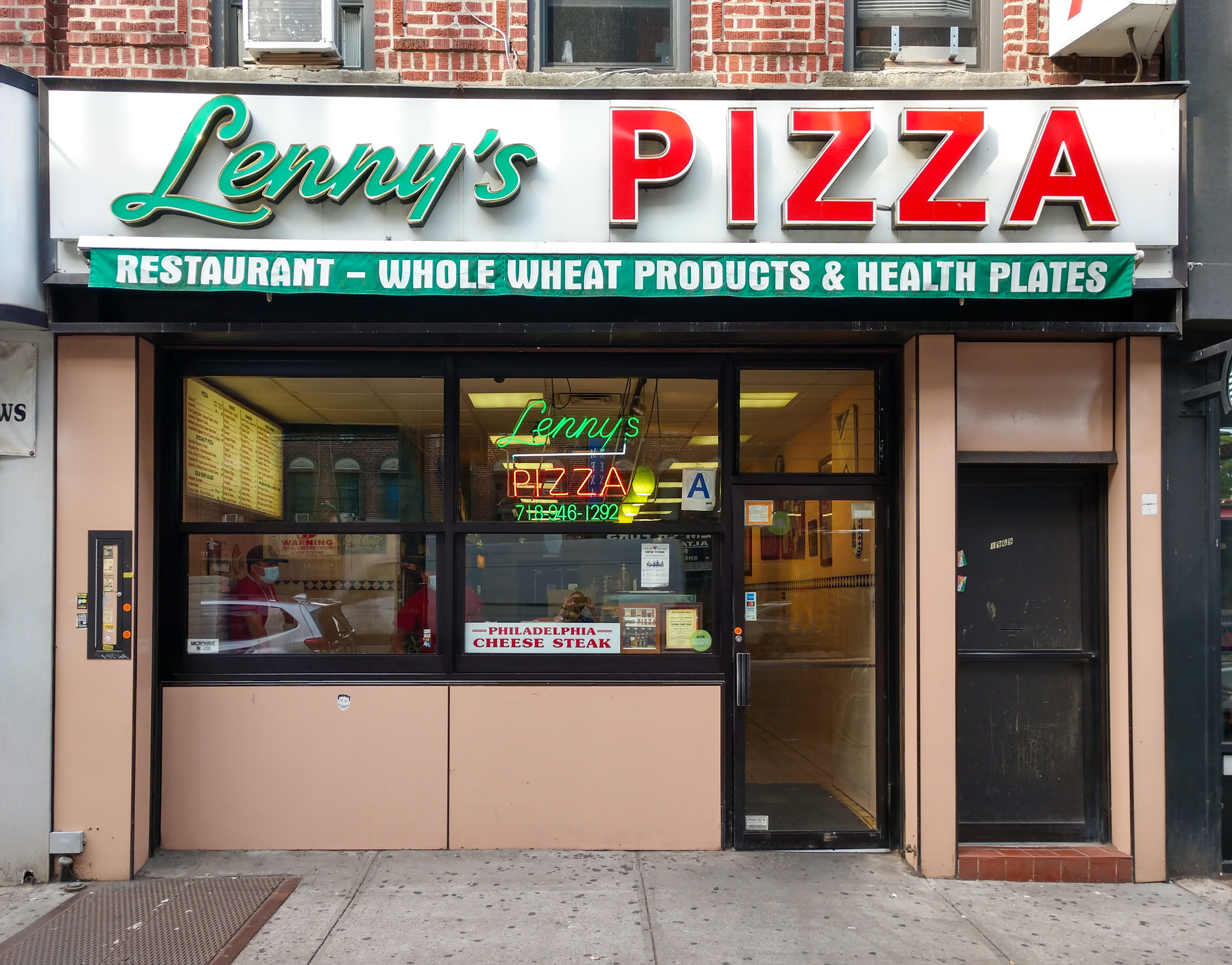
Lenny's Pizza

- Di Fara
- Grimaldi's
- Juliana's Pizza
- L&B Spumoni Gardens
- Lenny's Pizza
- Lucali
- Roberta's
- Totonno's

== Queens ==
- New Park Pizza
- Rizzo's Fine Pizza
