= Pizza in New York City =

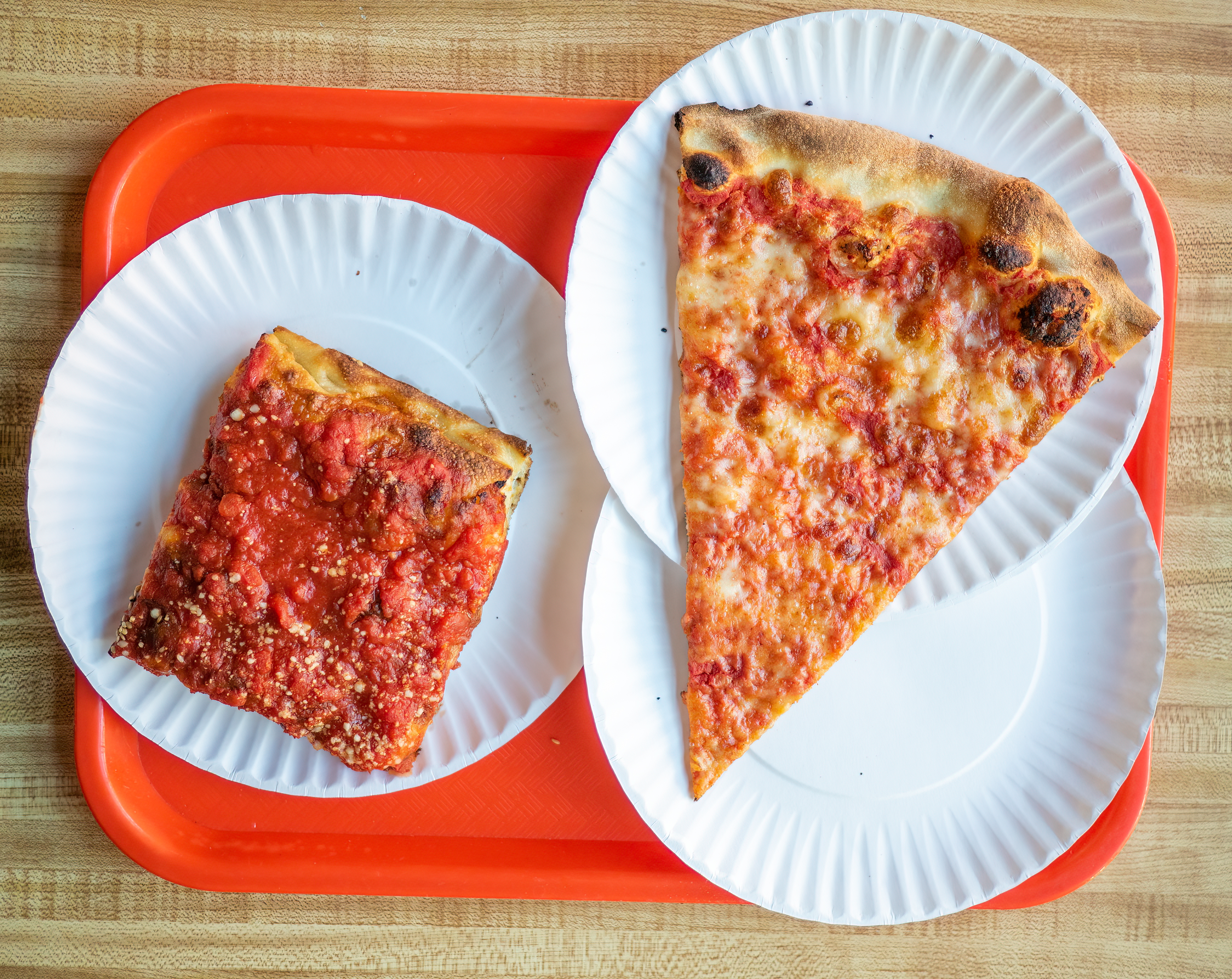
Slices of Sicilian pizza and New York–style pizza from a pizzeria in Brooklyn (2021)

Pizza is an important part of the culinary culture of New York City. In the late 19th and early 20th centuries, Italian immigrants adapted traditional Neapolitan pizza to the ovens available in New York, leading to New York–style pizza. Pizza of New York then, in turn, influenced pizza-making in Italy through the pizza effect. As of 2018, the city was home to between 800 and 3,000 pizzerias, serving a variety of styles and sometimes in stiff competition with each other. Coal ovens were popular early, gas ovens accompanied the popularity of restaurants selling pizza by the slice, and wood-fired ovens came with the popularity of the Neapolitan style. Slices range from inexpensive dollar slices to gourmet varieties. The price of a slice was once an economic indicator called the Pizza Principle. While the water supply is commonly believed to be responsible for the quality of pizza in the city, it is unlikely to make much of a difference.

== History ==
1903 advertisement for a pizzeria founded by Filippo Milone in an Italian language newspaper in New York City

In the late 1800s and early 1900s, Italian immigrants came together in an area of Manhattan later known as Little Italy. They brought with them a variety of culinary traditions, including Neapolitan pizza, a combination of flour, water, tomatoes, and cheese cooked in a domed, wood-fired oven. With no access to the kind of ovens needed to make that style, the immigrants rented time to use the bread ovens at local bakeries. These were much bigger and ran on coal, which burns at an even higher temperature than wood. As a result, the pizzas were much larger and one could feed multiple people, unlike the traditionally smaller Neapolitans. As gas ovens became more popular, pizza became easier to reheat without burning. and pizzas cooked inside took longer, leading to ingredients like oil being added to the dough and the introduction of toppings that would not otherwise have cooked properly in high heat.

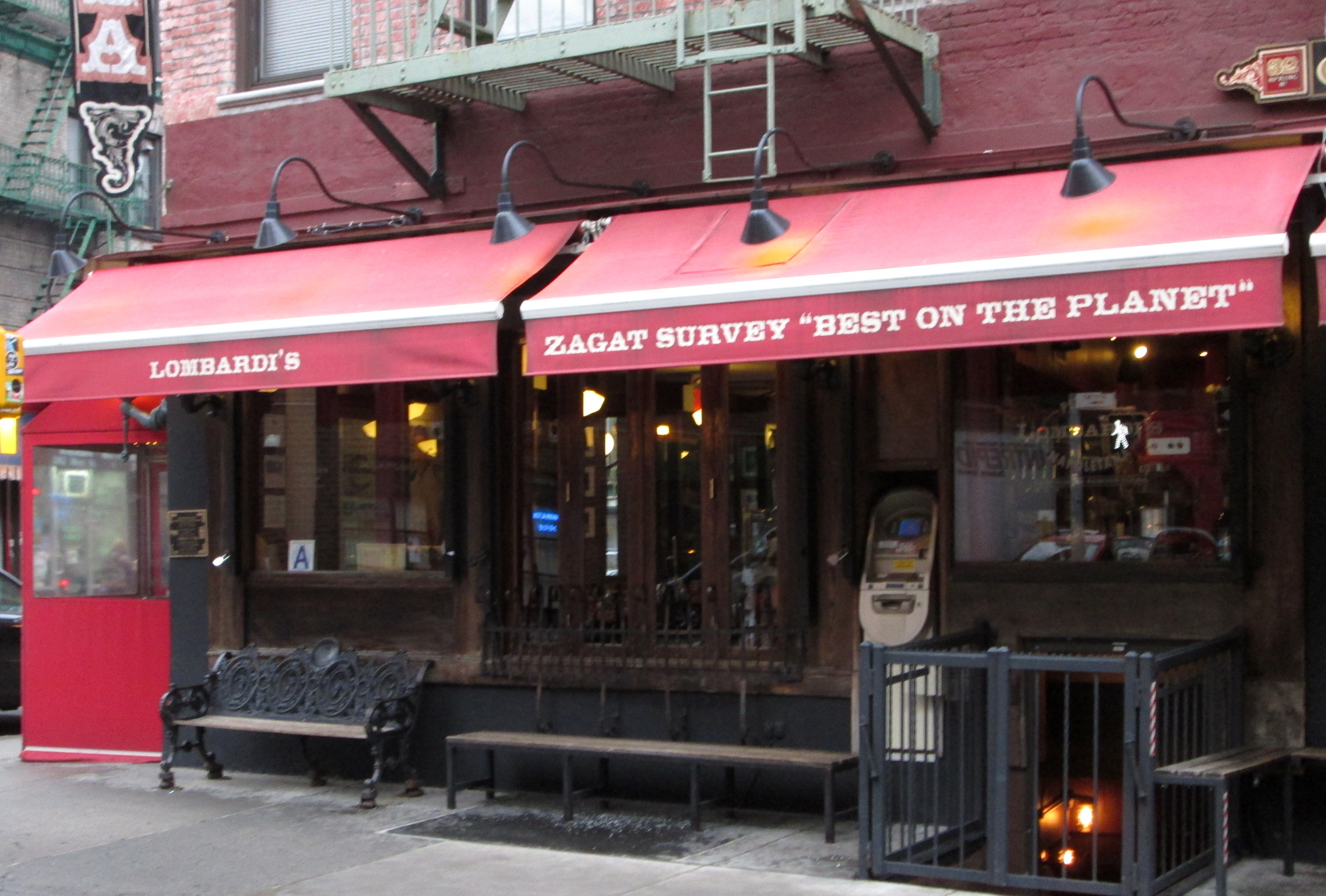
Lombardi's, Spring Street/Mott Street (2013)

The earliest known pizzeria in New York City, and thus likely the United States, was a business owned by Giovanni Albano at 59 1/2 Mulberry Street, which was operating by 1894. The oldest still-operating pizzeria, long thought to be the first, is Lombardi's in what is now Manhattan's Little Italy neighborhood. According to researcher Peter Regas in 2019, Lombardi's was most likely started by Filippo Milone in 1898, who founded and then sold several such businesses at the turn of the 20th century. This conflicts with a long-standing story of Gennaro Lombardi applying for a restaurant license to sell pizza at a grocery store in 1905. According to Regas, the business appeared to change hands multiple times before ownership by Lombardi.

== Styles ==
=== New York style ===
The basis for New York–style pizza is the Neapolitan style, which historically involved a hot, wood-fired, stone oven.

New York style is often cooked at a high temperature, sometimes using coal-fired ovens, to produce a crust that is both crisp and chewy.

When eating a slice, it is common to fold the pizza at the crust. It can be considered a political gaffe for candidates to stray from this practice.

=== Sicilian ===
Sicilian pizza is made in a rectangular pan coated in olive oil. The dough is allowed to proof for longer than other pizza styles, rising to make a thick, fluffy crust similar to focaccia bread.

=== Grandma ===
Grandma pizza is a rectangular pizza similar to Sicilian style, but the dough is not proofed as long, resulting in a thinner, denser crust. Grandma pizzas are often cooked with more olive oil in the pan, producing a crisper bottom. They get their name from the Italian-American grandmothers who did not have time to wait for the dough to proof. Though its origins are likely on Long Island, it is considered regional to the New York City metropolitan area. In some pizzerias, cheese sits below the tomato sauce.

=== Neapolitan ===
Pizza began in Naples, cooked quickly in a very hot wood-fired oven, combining flour, water, tomatoes, and cheese. It was adapted into New York style by immigrants using bread ovens, but more traditional Neapolitan style became popular in New York in the 2000s. In 2009, New York magazine wrote of the "neoclassical Neapolitan pizza revolution" in New York, citing high-profile examples like Una Pizza Napoletana, with an emphasis on quality of ingredients, tradition, and skilled chefs.

== Ingredients ==
=== Water ===
A common belief is that pizza in New York City tastes better because of the city's unfiltered tap water, similar to an appreciation of New York bagels. Water is brought into the city from multiple areas, but most is from the Catskill and Delaware watersheds, which is considered "soft" because it has less calcium and magnesium than other water supplies. It flows to the Hillview Reservoir, where it is disinfected and treated with various chemicals that also raise its pH level to 7.2. By the time it reaches the taps of New York City, it has a variety of substances, but it is the second softest of any city in the United States. Calcium and magnesium has the effect of strengthening the bonds between proteins in the flour, so soft water leads to softer dough. According to Food & Wine, however, it is likely this difference in water has a nonzero but "minimal" effect on the final product, which varies considerably in quality even among pizzerias using the same water. Chef J. Kenji López-Alt ran a double-blind taste test experiment for Serious Eats in which full pizzas and baked doughs were prepared with waters of varying mineral content, but concluded only that "there is not enough of a trend in the data to make a definitive statement".

=== Flour ===
In 2026, a ban on the additive potassium bromate passed both legislative chambers and is pending the governor's signature. Many pizzerias use bromated flour to reduce the time it takes for dough to rest. Some pizzerias, like Scarr's in Lower Manhattan, mill their own flour.

== Pizzerias ==
Estimates for the total number of pizzerias in New York City range from 800 to 3,000. Most focus on selling individual slices rather than whole pies.

Lombardi's in the Little Italy neighborhood of Manhattan is the oldest still-operating pizzeria in New York City. It was long believed to be the oldest overall, though that is now a title attributed to Giovanni Albano, who operated a pizzeria on nearby Mulberry Street at least as far back as 1894. Many of the older pizzerias, like Lombardi's, used coal-fired ovens, which take up less space and operate at a higher temperature than other ovens, cooking the dough's exterior to a crisp while retaining a chewier interior. Though sometimes thought to have been banned in the city due to emitting smoke with harmful particulates, a 2016 law just required an emission control called a "scrubber" to filter the smoke of coal- and wood-fired ovens for human health and climate reasons. A subsequent 2024 regulation required an additional filter system. In addition to Lombardi's, Patsy's and John's of Bleecker Street in Manhattan, and Totonno's and Grimaldi's in Brooklyn are examples of coal oven pizzerias. In the 2000s, several Neapolitan-style pizzerias opened, many of them using a wood-fired oven instead of coal. While not all Neapolitan, Roberta's, Paulie Gee's, and Lucali in Brooklyn, and Kesté and Motorino in Manhattan use wood-fired ovens.

The earliest pizzerias sold only whole pies. The earliest to sell by the slice emerged in the 1930s. There are claims that Patsy's sold slices since it was founded in 1933, although an article in Serious Eats states evidence could not be found. They credit Bowery-based restaurant supply businessman Frank Mastro, who invented a popular pizza oven run on gas, manufactured by the Blodgett oven company. He opened a pizzeria on the Bowery both to sell pizza, but also to pitch the idea of opening a pizzeria. Gas-fired ovens do not run as hot as either wood or coal, so the pizzas each take longer and are drier, but are reheatable because of that dryness. The oven kicked off what Serious Eats called "the slice movement". The styles and restaurant aesthetics of these older, well-known slice shops were the basis for "cheffy" or "revivalist" slice shops like Best Pizza, aiming to perfect traditional methods at a higher price-point.

Competition between pizzerias has often been fierce, with frequent disputes over branding. Ray's, Joe's and Patsy's are all names used by several independent pizzerias, many of which were never owned by anyone named Ray, Joe, or Patsy. The popularity and competition between "Rays" became a cultural reference after disputes in the 1980s, and at one point there were dozens of businesses with the name. As described by The New York Times, "three [pizzerias owners], none named Ray, fought an epic battle over permutations of the Ray's pizza franchise (Famous Ray's Original Ray's, Famous Original Ray's) - until they finally joined forces to destroy the other Ray pretenders citywide".

== Culture ==
The earliest pizzerias, in the late-1800s and early-1900s, were primarily frequented by Italian immigrants, likely as social gathering places, but it grew in popularity as the 20th century progressed. In 1947 The New York Times wrote that "pizza could be as popular a snack as the hamburger if Americans only knew about it". Just six years later, the same paper described pizza as a "craze that ... threatens the pre-eminence of the hot dog and hamburger". In the 21st century, pizza is an extremely popular food in New York City and associated with the culture of the city. Grub Street described New York as "a pizza town, maybe the pizza town".

According to the Museum of the City of New York, while pizza was created in Naples, "New York City is recognized as the epicenter of the American pizza culture that has taken over the world." It has also had an influence on Italian cuisine through the pizza effect.

A video of a rat carrying a slice of pizza on subway stairs went viral in 2015. "Pizza Rat" received international attention and inspired many other rat-carrying-food memes, as well as performance art.

Various aspects of pizza and its consumption have cultural significance, including the manner of eating it. The 1977 movie Saturday Night Fever opens with John Travolta's character ordering a "double-decker" slice at Lenny's Pizza, placing one slice atop the other to eat both at the same time. Several commentators, including employees at Lenny's, remarked that "double-decker" is not a real way that people would order pizza, but the movie led many people to request it. In 2014, Mayor Bill de Blasio attracted media attention when he was seen eating pizza with a knife and fork. The event, nicknamed "Forkgate", led to a public debate over whether there is a proper way to eat pizza, as well as whether use of utensils is more prevalent in Italy.

== Economics ==
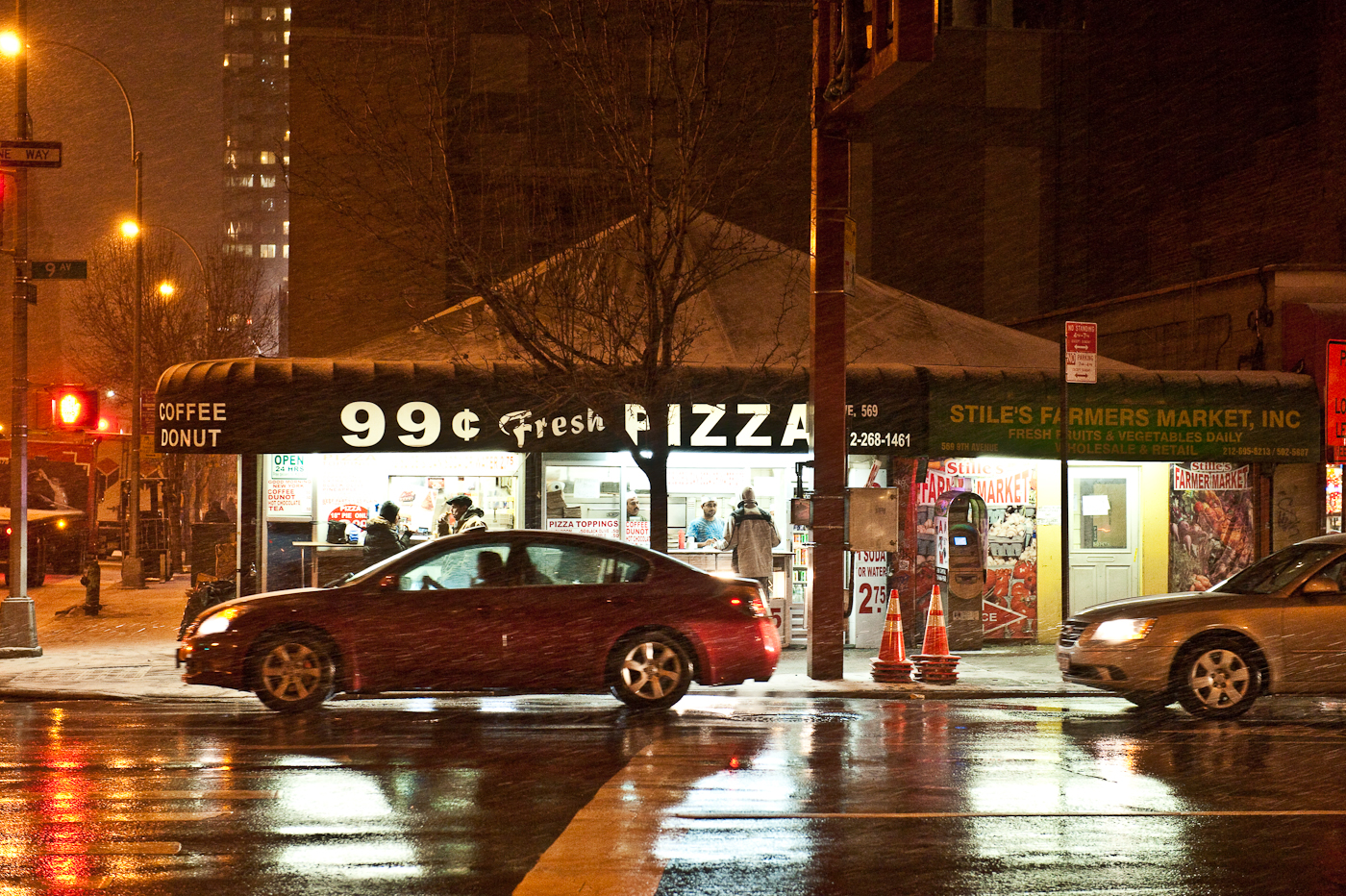
99 Cent Fresh Pizza, Ninth Avenue/West 41st Street (2009)

The price of a slice of pizza in New York City can be controversial. There was a protest outside NY Pizza Suprema in the early 1970s when it raised its price from $0.20 to $0.25 a slice. In the 2000s and 2010s, new "dollar slice" businesses opened which prioritized high-volume sales at a low price, charging $0.99 or $1.00 for a slice of pizza. These became especially popular after the 2008 financial crisis. Most are located in Manhattan, where population density is high enough to support such a business model, and they often operate as chains. In the early 2020s, amid rising inflation, many of these shops increased their prices. Critics of the model argue that it is detrimental to traditional neighborhood "midpriced" pizzerias.

The cost of a slice at any given point has been used as an economic indicator via the Pizza Principle, which references a long-term correlation, first noted by George Fasel in The New York Times in 1985, between the cost of a fare on the New York City Subway and the price of a slice of pizza. In 2019, the Wall Street Journal said the principle no longer held because gourmet pizzerias drove the cost of pizza up while the MTA held its fare low.
