= Mark Iacono =

American cook and restaurateur

- Born: November 24, 1966 (age 59); Brooklyn, New York, U.S.
- Occupation: Pizzaiolo
- Known for: Lucali

Mark Iacono (born November 24, 1966) is an American pizzaiolo, who founded the pizzeria Lucali in Carroll Gardens, Brooklyn in 2006. He has received national recognition for his restaurant and has since expanded to several locations around the country.

== Restaurant business ==
Prior to starting Lucali, Iacono worked in construction and focused on granite and marble fabrication. Iacono rented out a candy store he frequented in his youth located on Henry St in Brooklyn. Iacono wanted to keep a local pizzeria. Other than his grandmother, Iacono said that Domenico "Dom" DeMarco of Di Fara Pizza was another inspiration for him, watching Dom take pizza to the next level. Iacono says when he started the restaurant he had no experience in the food industry, never having made a pizza in his life.

In 2011, Iacono was involved in a knife fight with ex-con and mobster Batista "Benny" Geritano. The fight was rumored to be over a shakedown from the mob wanting a cut of Iacono's profits. The altercation occurred at Joe's Superette, an old-fashioned store located at the corner of Carroll and Smith street.

Iacono has starred in multiple shows including Netflix's Ugly Delicious, The Pizza Show and Munchies. He has appeared a few times with pizzaiolo Frank Pinello. One of his favorite Italian comfort foods is the English muffin pizza.
