= Domenico DeMarco =

Italian pizzaiolo (1936–2022)

Domenico De Marco
- Born: December 4, 1936; Caserta, Italy
- Died: March 17, 2022 (aged 85); Brooklyn, New York, U.S.
- Occupation: Pizzaiolo
- Known for: Di Fara Pizza

Domenico De Marco (December 4, 1936 – March 17, 2022) was an Italian pizza chef, who founded the pizzeria Di Fara Pizza on Avenue J in Brooklyn in 1965. He received national recognition for his restaurant and was considered an artist of pizza in Brooklyn.

== Restaurant business ==
DeMarco emigrated from Caserta in Italy in 1959. He opened Di Fara Pizza with his business partner Farina in Midwood, Brooklyn, in 1965. The name Di Fara comes from a combination of his and his business partner's names. DeMarco bought out Farina in 1978, but kept the name the same.

DeMarco heavily influenced Brooklyn pizza including younger pizzaiolos Mark Iacono of Lucali and Frank Pinello of Best Pizza. Iacono referred to De Marco as the "Joe DiMaggio of pizza". Others have referred to DeMarco as a "pizza god" and "pizza-father". Many consider Di Fara's to be the best pizzeria in New York City.

On March 17, 2022, DeMarco died at the age of 85.
