= The Zimmern List =

- Genre: Food; Travel
- Directed by: Hayden Mauk; Chris Marino; Brian Peter Falk; Patrick Weiland
- Starring: Andrew Zimmern
- Country of origin: United States
- No. of seasons: 2
- No. of episodes: 34

Production
- Executive producers: Patrick Weiland; Andrew Zimmern; Dan O'Brien
- Editors: Bobby Zeleny; Cory Ginsburg; Linda H. Lamm; Keir Randall; Beth Seigal
- Running time: 21 minutes

Original release
- Network: Travel Channel
- Release: September 14, 2017 – February 2, 2019

The Zimmern List is a 2017 Daytime Emmy-winning travel and cuisine television show hosted by Andrew Zimmern on the Travel Channel in the US. The first season debuted on Thursday, September 14, 2017. On May 8, 2018, the series was picked up for a second season.

The Zimmern List finds Andrew visiting a different city, serving as the viewers' guide while he recounts personal food memories, shares the culinary history of each location, and shows what to eat and where to find it.

== Episodes ==
=== Season 1 (2017–18) ===
Episode	Title	Restaurant	Location	Original Air Date
1	Portland, Maine	Red's Eats	Wiscasset, Maine	September 14, 2017
1	Portland, Maine	Five Islands Lobster Co.	Georgetown, Maine	September 14, 2017
1	Portland, Maine	Duckfat	Portland, Maine	September 14, 2017
1	Portland, Maine	The Holy Donut		September 14, 2017
1	Portland, Maine	Eventide Oyster Co.		September 14, 2017
1	Portland, Maine	Standard Baking Co.		September 14, 2017
1	Portland, Maine	Fore Street		September 14, 2017
1	Portland, Maine	Miyake		September 14, 2017
2	Boston	Polcari's Coffee	North End, Boston	September 14, 2017
2	Boston	Bricco Panetteria	North End, Boston	September 14, 2017
2	Boston	Salumeria Italiana	North End, Boston	September 14, 2017
2	Boston	Roxy's Grilled Cheese	Cambridge, Massachusetts	September 14, 2017
2	Boston	Little Donkey	Cambridge, Massachusetts	September 14, 2017
2	Boston	Island Creek Oysters		September 14, 2017
2	Boston	Fenway Park		September 14, 2017
3	Los Angeles	Eggslut	Grand Central Market	March 13, 2018
3	Los Angeles	Tacos Tumbras a Tomas	Grand Central Market	March 13, 2018
3	Los Angeles	Sqirl	Silver Lake, Los Angeles	March 13, 2018
3	Los Angeles	Night + Market Song		March 13, 2018
3	Los Angeles	Langer's Deli	MacArthur Park	March 13, 2018
3	Los Angeles	Kismet	Los Feliz, Los Angeles	March 13, 2018
4	Austin	Franklin Barbecue	East Side	March 13, 2018
4	Austin	Fresa's	South 1st Street	March 13, 2018
4	Austin	Guero's Taco Bar	South Congress	March 13, 2018
4	Austin	Ramen Tatsu-Ya		March 13, 2018
4	Austin	Big Kahuna's Food truck	5000 Burnet	March 13, 2018
4	Austin	Tita's Food Truck	5000 Burnet	March 13, 2018
4	Austin	The B's Kitchen	5000 Burnet	March 13, 2018
4	Austin	Stubb's Bar-B-Q		March 13, 2018
5	New Orleans	Antoine's	French Quarter	March 20, 2018
5	New Orleans	Central Grocery	French Quarter	March 20, 2018
5	New Orleans	Maple Leaf Bar	Oak Street (New Orleans)	March 20, 2018
5	New Orleans	R&O's Restaurant		March 20, 2018
5	New Orleans	Cafe Du Monde	French Quarter	March 20, 2018
6	San Francisco	Cockscomb		March 27, 2018
6	San Francisco	Onsen		March 27, 2018
6	San Francisco	Lers Ros		March 27, 2018
6	San Francisco	Cowgirl Creamery	Ferry Building Marketplace	March 27, 2018
6	San Francisco	Out the Door	Ferry Building Marketplace	March 27, 2018
6	San Francisco	Swan Oyster Depot		March 27, 2018
7	San Diego	Filippi's Pizza Grotto		April 3, 2018
7	San Diego	Ironside Fish & Oyster		April 3, 2018
7	San Diego	Los Slydogz	Barrio Logan	April 3, 2018
7	San Diego	Por Vida	Barrio Logan	April 3, 2018
7	San Diego	¡SALUD!	Barrio Logan	April 3, 2018
7	San Diego	The Crack Shack		April 3, 2018
7	San Diego	Juniper & Ivy		April 3, 2018
7	San Diego	Pokirrito		April 3, 2018
8	Branson	Silver Dollar City		April 10, 2018
8	Branson	Branson Cafe		April 10, 2018
8	Branson	The Fudge Shop		April 10, 2018
8	Branson	Dolly Parton's Stampede		April 10, 2018
8	Branson	Dobyns Dining Room at the Keeter Center	College of the Ozarks	April 10, 2018
9	New York City	L&B Spumoni Gardens	Brooklyn, New York	April 17, 2018
9	New York City	Di Fara Pizza		April 17, 2018
9	New York City	Russ & Daughters		April 17, 2018
9	New York City	Katz's Delicatessen		April 17, 2018
9	New York City	Nom Wah Tea Parlor		April 17, 2018
9	New York City	Peking Duck House		April 17, 2018
9	New York City	Grand Central Oyster Bar		April 17, 2018
10	Nashville	City House		April 24, 2018
10	Nashville	Biscuit Love		April 24, 2018
10	Nashville	Urban Cowboy	Lockeland Springs	April 24, 2018
10	Nashville	Music City Food + Wine Festival		April 24, 2018
11	Seattle	Pike Place Market		May 1, 2018
11	Seattle	JarrBar	Pike Place Market	May 1, 2018
11	Seattle	Maneki	Chinatown-International District, Seattle	May 1, 2018
11	Seattle	Iconiq	Mount Baker, Seattle	May 1, 2018
11	Seattle	Eden Hill	Bellevue, Washington	May 1, 2018
11	Seattle	Ivar's		May 1, 2018
12	Chicago	Superdawg	Norwood Park, Chicago	May 8, 2018
12	Chicago	Pequod's Pizza	Lincoln Park, Chicago	May 8, 2018
12	Chicago	Xi'an Cruisine	Chinatown, Chicago	May 8, 2018
12	Chicago	Khan B.B.Q.	Devon Avenue (Chicago)	May 8, 2018
12	Chicago	Roister	Fulton-Randolph Market District	May 8, 2018
12	Chicago	Grace	Near West Side, Chicago	May 8, 2018
13	Las Vegas	Bazaar Meat by Josė Andrės	SLS Las Vegas	May 15, 2018
13	Las Vegas	Chubby Cattle		May 15, 2018
13	Las Vegas	Hoback		May 15, 2018
13	Las Vegas	Market Street Cafe	California Hotel and Casino	May 15, 2018
13	Las Vegas	Taqueria El Buen Pastor Food truck		May 15, 2018
14	Baltimore	Chaps Pit Beef		May 22, 2018
14	Baltimore	Lexington Market		May 22, 2018
14	Baltimore	Di Pasquale's	Highlandtown, Baltimore	May 22, 2018
14	Baltimore	L.P. Steamers	Locust Point, Baltimore	May 22, 2018
14	Baltimore	Tailgate party	M&T Bank Stadium	May 22, 2018
14	Baltimore	Rye Street Tavern	Port Covington	May 22, 2018
15	Twin Cities	Surly Brewing Company	St. Anthony, Minnesota	May 29, 2018
15	Twin Cities	Spoon and Stable	North Loop, Minneapolis	May 29, 2018
15	Twin Cities	Quang Restaurant	Nicollet Avenue	May 29, 2018
15	Twin Cities	Safari Restaurant	Powderhorn, Minneapolis	May 29, 2018
15	Twin Cities	Excelsior Legion Hall	Lake Minnetonka	May 29, 2018
15	Twin Cities	CHS Field	Saint Paul, Minnesota	May 29, 2018
16	Portland, Oregon	Alder Street Food Cart Pod		June 5, 2018
16	Portland, Oregon	Broder Nord		June 5, 2018
16	Portland, Oregon	Cartopia		June 5, 2018
16	Portland, Oregon	Le Pigeon		June 5, 2018
16	Portland, Oregon	Blue Star		June 5, 2018
17	Atlanta	Mary Mac's Tea Room	Midtown Atlanta	June 12, 2018
17	Atlanta	Miller Union		June 12, 2018
17	Atlanta	The General Muir	Emory Point	June 12, 2018
17	Atlanta	Ann's Snack Bar		June 12, 2018
17	Atlanta	Ponce City Market	Old Fourth Ward	June 12, 2018
17	Atlanta	Gunshow		June 12, 2018
18	Washington, D.C.	Unconventional Diner	Shaw (Washington, D.C.)	June 19, 2018
18	Washington, D.C.	Henry's Cafe	U Street	June 19, 2018
18	Washington, D.C.	Union Market		June 19, 2018
18	Washington, D.C.	Maketto	Atlas District	June 19, 2018
18	Washington, D.C.	Minibar	Penn Quarter	June 19, 2018

=== Season 2 (2018–2019) ===
Episode	Title	Restaurant	Location	Original Air Date
1	Birmingham, Alabama	Miss Myra's	Cahaba Heights, Vestavia Hills	December 22, 2018
1	Birmingham, Alabama	Highlands Bar & Grill	Southside (Birmingham)	December 22, 2018
1	Birmingham, Alabama	Ovenbird	The Market at Pepper Place	December 22, 2018
1	Birmingham, Alabama	Eagle's Restaurant	Acipco-Finley	December 22, 2018
1	Birmingham, Alabama	SAW's Juke Joint	Crestline Park	December 22, 2018
2	Miami	El Palacio De Los Jugos	Flagami	January 12, 2019
2	Miami	Taquiza	North Beach (Miami Beach)	January 12, 2019
2	Miami	Amara at Paraiso	Edgewater (Miami)	January 12, 2019
2	Miami	Yambo	Little Havana	January 12, 2019
2	Miami	La Mar	Brickell Key	January 12, 2019
3	Philadelphia	South 9th Street Italian Market	Bella Vista, Philadelphia	February 2, 2019
3	Philadelphia	Ralph's Italian Restaurant	Bella Vista, Philadelphia	February 2, 2019
3	Philadelphia	Hardena	Point Breeze, Philadelphia	February 2, 2019
3	Philadelphia	Zahav	Society Hill	February 2, 2019
4	Charleston, South Carolina	Martha Lou's Kitchen	NoMo District	January 19, 2019
4	Charleston, South Carolina	Nana's Seafood & Soul	Westside	January 19, 2019
4	Charleston, South Carolina	Rodney Scott's BBQ – Charleston	North Central	January 19, 2019
4	Charleston, South Carolina	Callie's Hot Little Biscuit	Upper King Street	January 19, 2019
4	Charleston, South Carolina	The Ordinary	Upper King Street	January 19, 2019
4	Charleston, South Carolina	Leon's Oyster Shop	North Central	January 19, 2019
5	Louisville, Kentucky	Milkwood	Downtown Louisville	January 26, 2019
5	Louisville, Kentucky	El Molcajete	South Louisville	January 26, 2019
5	Louisville, Kentucky	Hammerheads	Germantown, Louisville	January 26, 2019
5	Louisville, Kentucky	Royal's Hot Chicken	East Market District, Louisville	January 26, 2019
6	Memphis, Tennessee	Gus's World Famous Fried Chicken	Downtown Memphis, Tennessee	December 15, 2018
6	Memphis, Tennessee	Charles Vergos Rendezvous	Downtown Memphis, Tennessee	December 15, 2018
6	Memphis, Tennessee	The Second Line	Overton Square, Midtown, Memphis, Tennessee	December 15, 2018
6	Memphis, Tennessee	Hog & Hominy	Brookhaven Circle, East Memphis, Memphis, Tennessee	December 15, 2018
6	Memphis, Tennessee	The Four Way Soul Food Restaurant	South Memphis, Memphis, Tennessee	December 15, 2018
6	Memphis, Tennessee	Dyer's Burgers	Beale Street	December 15, 2018
7	Houston	Gatlin's BBQ	Oak Forest, Houston	December 29, 2018
7	Houston	Crawfish & Noodles	Bellaire Boulevard	December 29, 2018
7	Houston	Hugo's	Montrose, Houston	December 29, 2018
7	Houston	Himalaya Restaurant	Mahatma Gandhi District, Houston	December 29, 2018
7	Houston	Ninfa's	Second Ward, Houston	December 29, 2018
8	Oakland	Brown Sugar Kitchen	West Oakland, Oakland, California	January 5, 2019
8	Oakland	Hawking Bird	Temescal, Oakland, California	January 5, 2019
8	Oakland	Swan's Market	9th and Clay Streets	January 5, 2019
8	Oakland	Nyum Bai	Fruitvale, Oakland, California	January 5, 2019
8	Oakland	Reem's California	Fruitvale, Oakland, California	January 5, 2019
9	Reno	Casale's Halfway Club	East Reno	December 22, 2018
9	Reno	Louis' Basque Corner	Riverwalk District	December 22, 2018
9	Reno	Pignic Pub & Patio	Riverwalk District	December 22, 2018
9	Reno	Liberty Food & Wine Exchange	Riverwalk District	December 22, 2018
9	Reno	Kwok's Bistro		December 22, 2018
10	Cleveland	Mabel's BBQ	Playhouse Square	January 26, 2019
10	Cleveland	Trentina	University Circle	January 26, 2019
10	Cleveland	West Side Market	Ohio City, Cleveland	January 26, 2019
10	Cleveland	Edwin's Restaurant	Shaker Square	January 26, 2019
10	Cleveland	Saucisson	Slavic Village	January 26, 2019
11	Pittsburgh	Emil's Lounge	Rankin, Pennsylvania	January 5, 2019
11	Pittsburgh	Apteka	Bloomfield (Pittsburgh)	January 5, 2019
11	Pittsburgh	Smallman Galley	Strip District, Pittsburgh	January 5, 2019
11	Pittsburgh	Morcilla	Lawrenceville (Pittsburgh)	January 5, 2019
11	Pittsburgh	Hidden Harbor	Squirrel Hill (Pittsburgh)	January 5, 2019
12	Queens	Tortas Neza	Jackson Heights, Queens	December 15, 2018
12	Queens	Happy Stony Noodle	Elmhurst, Queens	December 15, 2018
12	Queens	El Gauchito	Corona, Queens	December 15, 2018
12	Queens	Gregory's 26 Taverna	Astoria, Queens	December 15, 2018
12	Queens	Kabab Cafė	Steinway Street	December 15, 2018
13	Providence, Rhode Island	Scialo's Bakery	Federal Hill, Providence, Rhode Island	January 12, 2019
13	Providence, Rhode Island	Tony's Colonial Food	Federal Hill, Providence, Rhode Island	January 12, 2019
13	Providence, Rhode Island	Al Forno	Fox Point, Providence, Rhode Island	January 12, 2019
13	Providence, Rhode Island	O Dinis	East Providence, Rhode Island	January 12, 2019
13	Providence, Rhode Island	Bayberry Beer Hall	West End, Providence, Rhode Island	January 12, 2019
13	Providence, Rhode Island	Birch	Downtown, Providence, Rhode Island	January 12, 2019
14	St. Louis, Missouri	Pappy's Smokehouse	Midtown St Louis	December 29, 2018
14	St. Louis, Missouri	Grace Meat + Three	The Grove, St. Louis	December 29, 2018
14	St. Louis, Missouri	Gioia's Deli	The Hill, St. Louis	December 29, 2018
14	St. Louis, Missouri	Pastaria	Clayton, Missouri	December 29, 2018
14	St. Louis, Missouri	Nudo	Creve Coeur, Missouri	December 29, 2018
14	St. Louis, Missouri	Smoki O's Bar-b-Que	North Riverfront, St Louis	December 29, 2018
15	Detroit	Eastern Market	Eastern Market, Detroit	January 19, 2019
15	Detroit	Loui's Pizza	Hazel Park, Michigan	January 19, 2019
15	Detroit	Al-Ameer Meat Market	Dearborn, Michigan	January 19, 2019
15	Detroit	Lady of the House	Corktown, Detroit	January 19, 2019
16	Orlando	Orlando Meats	Mills 50 District	February 2, 2019
16	Orlando	Black Rooster Taqueria	Mills 50 District	February 2, 2019
16	Orlando	Lombardi's Seafood	Winter Park, Florida	February 2, 2019
16	Orlando	Domu	East End Market	February 2, 2019
16	Orlando	Shiraz Market	Longwood, Florida	February 2, 2019
