= L&B =

L&B or L and B may refer to:

- L&B Spumoni Gardens, pizzeria and restaurant in New York City
- Lynton and Barnstaple Railway, a railway in England
- Lambert & Butler, a cigarette brand
