= NY Pizza Suprema =

Restaurant in Manhattan, New York, U.S.

- The exterior of the pizzeria in 2026
- Interactive map of NY Pizza Suprema

Restaurant information
- Coordinates: 40.75015°N 73.9952°W
- Website: nypizzasuprema.com

NY Pizza Suprema is a pizzeria on Eighth Avenue in Manhattan, New York City, near Madison Square Garden and Penn Station.

Italian immigrant Sal Riggio founded the business in 1964. He got into the business through two of his brothers-in-law, who operated pizzerias in Brooklyn. Pizza Suprema wasn't Riggio's first attempt, having owned other pizzerias in Bay Ridge and Downtown Brooklyn. His wife, Maria, pressed him to buy the building on Eighth Avenue, in an area of Manhattan Sal had grown to dislike when he was a boy. Madison Square Garden had not yet been built, but the RCA Institute (now Touro College) provided student foot traffic. The name was the sign maker's mistake, accidentally turning "NY Pizza Supreme" into "NY Pizza Suprema".

For decades, until 1988, Riggio only served cheese slices, without toppings, and serving no other products in an effort to perfect it. The restaurant still displays his quote, "do one thing but do it better than anyone else". Sal's son, Joe, worked in the restaurant until conflicts between the two led him to leave at age 26. He returned to the family business part-time later, and took over the business after Sal's death. As of 2022, it serves about 20 varieties, presented in a glass case. The pizza is New York style, made with a sweet tomato sauce and Grande whole milk low moisture mozzarella with a lot of pecorino. As of 2019, it used the same gas-powered ovens it began with in 1964. Pizza takes longer to bake in a gas oven, but it removes more of the moisture and makes them better suited to reheating.

The pizza was important enough to local students that they protested outside Pizza Suprema in the early 1970s when it raised its price from $0.20 to $0.25 a slice.

In a four-out-of-five-star review, Time Out said "the basics are where this place shines". Eater called it "undoubtedly one of the most celebrated neighborhood pizzerias in Manhattan". It was the only pizzeria to receive a perfect score from Slice Harvester, a website whose owner tried every slice shop in Manhattan and devoted a chapter of her subsequent book to Pizza Suprema.

Tony Dara of St. Mark's Pizza learned to make pizzas from Sal Riggio when they were neighbors.

== See also ==
- Italians in New York City
- Pizza in New York City
  - List of pizzerias in New York City
