= Frank Pinello =

American cook and restaurateur

- Born: August 19, 1982 (age 44); Brooklyn, New York, U.S.
- Occupations: Pizzaiolo; Reporter
- Known for: The Pizza Show; Best Pizza

Francesco Pinello (born August 19, 1982) is an American pizzaiolo, who founded the pizzeria Best Pizza in 2010 in Williamsburg, Brooklyn. He also works as a reporter for Viceland on The Pizza Show and regularly appears on Munchies.

== Early life ==
Pinello worked at now defunct pizzeria, Angelo's, when he was young. He said this was where he learned to make pizza. Pinello studied at The Culinary Institute of America and wanted to go into fine dining.

He is of Sicilian descent. His mother's side of the family comes from Palermo, while his father's side of the family is from Baucina.

== Career ==
Pinello opened Best Pizza in Williamsburg, Brooklyn in 2010. The white pizza became a specialty at the restaurant. He consulted Zak Fishman who opened Prime Pizza in Los Angeles, in order to help Fishman create a more authentic East Coast styled dough.

Pinello regularly reports on food for Vice and appeared on The Pizza Show and Munchies. He has reported with Lucali owner, Mark Iacono.
