= JarrBar =

Defunct bar and restaurant in Seattle, Washington, U.S.

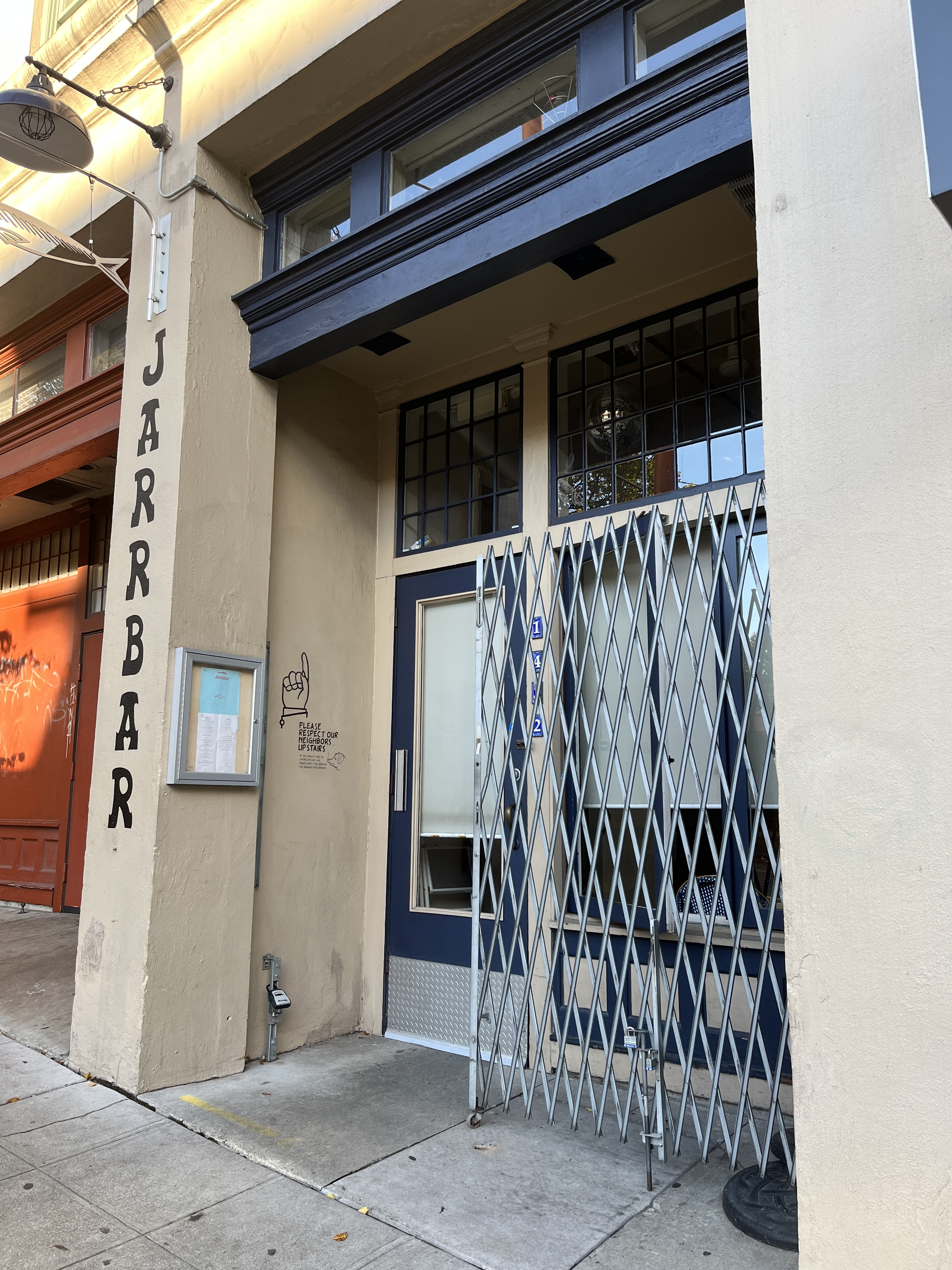
- Exterior (2022)
- Interactive map of JarrBar

Restaurant information
- Established: 2015
- Owner: Bryan Jarr
- Location: 1432 Western Avenue, Seattle, King, Washington, United States
- Coordinates: 47°36′30″N 122°20′27″W

JarrBar was a bar and restaurant in Seattle, Washington, United States. It closed permanently in 2025.

== Description and history ==
JarrBar operated on Western Avenue at Pike Place Market. Bryan Jarr was the owner. Established in 2015, the business served small plates, including seafood and Spanish cuisine. Options included anchovies and piquillo peppers. JarrBar also served jars and tins of preserved fish and olives.

In 2017, American chef Andrew Zimmern visited JarrBar while filming for the television series The Zimmern List. JarrBar closed permanently in 2025.

== Reception ==
Aimee Rizzo of The Infatuation wrote, "Pike Place is kind of a crowded mess, but Jarrbar is a little cocktail bar removed from all of the craziness. It reminds us of a galley-style kitchen in a studio apartment, but we can't think of anywhere else we’d rather drink a gin fizz alongside some jamon Iberico and crackers. We also really like the smoked salmon rilettes."

== See also ==
- List of defunct restaurants of the United States
