= Dollar slice =

Pizza slice sold for one dollar

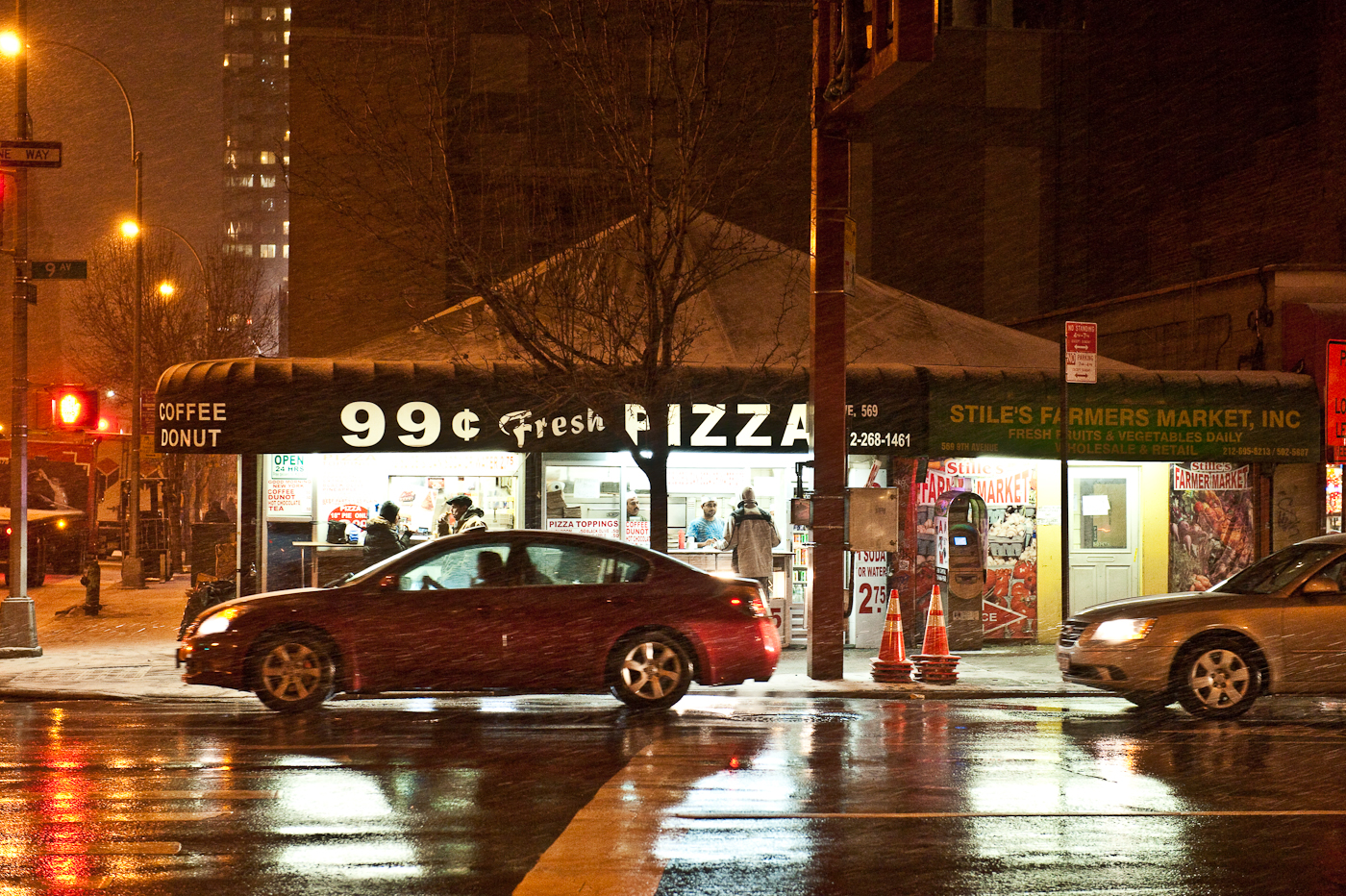
99 Cent Fresh Pizza, established in 2001, was the first pizzeria to sell the dollar slice.

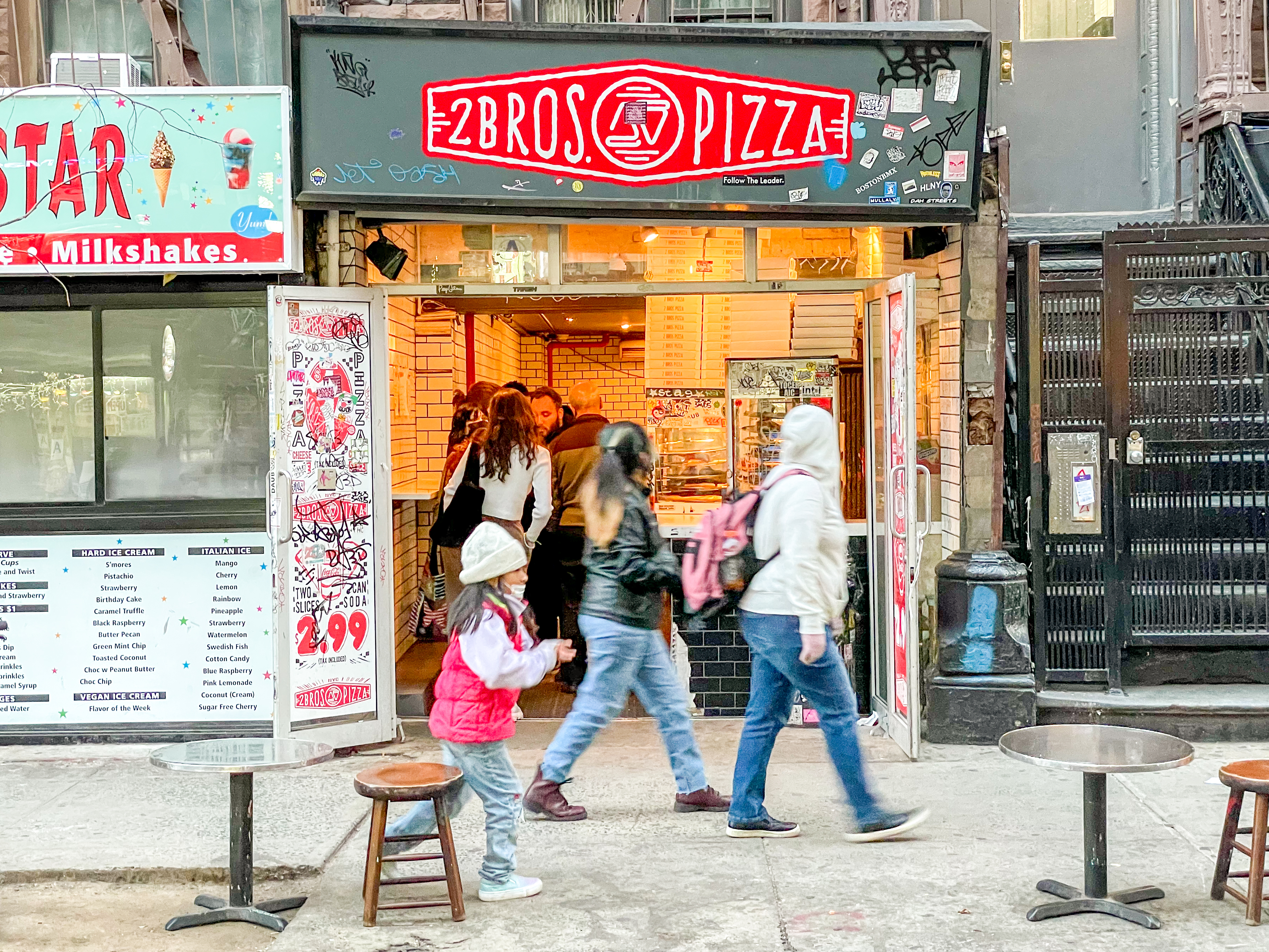
2 Bros. Pizza, established in 2008, increased the popularity of the dollar slice.

The dollar slice is a phenomenon in New York City of pizza sold by the slice for one U.S. dollar. The business model involves slimmer profit margins on a high volume of pizzas sold. The dollar slice is popular as an affordable food option.

The first dollar-slice shop in New York was 99 Cent Fresh Pizza in 2001. Early dollar-slice shops served homeless people in the city. The concept became more popular during the Great Recession. The chain 2 Bros. Pizza opened in 2008 and influenced the establishment of several dollar-slice chains in the 2000s. Inflation led to many establishments raising their prices above one dollar, especially during the 2020s.

== History ==
Pizza originated in 19th-century Naples, where individual slices of pizza were sold at a low price, though modern pizzerias in Naples do not sell slices. Italians in New York City introduced pizza to the city by the end of the century. Pizza by the slice became common in the city in the 1940s.

The phenomenon of selling pizza for one dollar originated with 99 Cent Fresh Pizza, which opened in 2001. Its owner, Mohammad Hossain, chose to sell pizza for $1.00 to serve New York City's homeless population. Early dollar-slice shops were located near homeless shelters.

The dollar slice was popularized during the 2008 recession, when outlets opened at locations with many pedestrians or subway commuters. The chain 2 Bros. Pizza opened in 2008 on St. Mark's Place in the East Village. It initially sold one-dollar slices as an opening-day promotion, but decided to keep doing it. It became a competitor of 99 Cent Fresh. By 2010, the city had about fifteen places selling dollar slices; 2 Bros and 99 Cent Fresh each had four locations. At the time, both chains priced a combo meal with two slices and a soda at $2.75. The popularity of 2 Bros. led to the opening of several similar chains in the 2010s. In 2012, 2 Bros location on Avenue of the Americas entered a price war with a nearby dollar slice shop called Bombay Fast Food/6 Ave. Pizza. The price at both establishments reached a low of 75¢ in March before they agreed to fix the price at $1 in September.

As inflation occurred, many businesses raised their prices to $1.50 or higher. High inflation in the 2020s made it difficult for dollar slice businesses to make a profit; many reported their revenue going down by 50% since before the COVID-19 pandemic. Prices of ingredients such as flour and pepperoni increased, while the increase in food delivery during the pandemic led to a shortage of products such as pizza boxes. However, the price of cheese decreased in 2022, in part due to dairy subsidies, enabling prices to remain low for some businesses. The lack of pedestrian traffic from office workers and tourists further lowered profits. Few establishments, including 99 Cent Fresh and older locations of 2 Bros., continued to sell for one dollar in 2021. All locations of 2 Bros. increased their price to $1.50 by March 2023, when the original location changed its price. In New Jersey, two establishments selling dollar slices remained in 2023.

== Popularity ==
The culture of the dollar slice is unique to New York City. The city has dozens of dollar-slice shops. The dollar slice is popular as a cheap, fast food option in the city, which has a high cost of living. Many pizza critics dislike the dollar slice phenomenon and believe it has caused a decline in mid-range shops where a slice costs $2.50. Dollar slice businesses argue that such shops are also low quality and that the dollar slice is more affordable.

Dollar slice establishments have a business model of selling a large quantity of pizzas with a small profit margin. Most use electric ovens to enable making up to 400 pizzas daily, though this results in unevenly cooked pizzas. Many such businesses are open 24 hours and appeal to customers at night. They operate at properties with low rents and sometimes rely on discounts from landlords. Employees, often immigrants, work eight- to ten-hour shifts.

== See also ==
- Pizza Principle – economic model based on the price of a pizza slice in New York City
