= Reem's California =

Restaurant in the U.S. state of California

- Mission District location
- Interactive map of Reem's California

Restaurant information
- Chef: Reem Assil
- Location: California, United States
- Coordinates: 37°45′02″N 122°25′05″W
- Website: reemscalifornia.com

Reem's California is a restaurant in California, United States. Reem's originally opened in Oakland in the Fruitvale neighborhood, and operated there 2017 to 2021 before the spot they were located in became Wahpepah's Kitchen. Their first location in San Francisco opened in the Mission District in March 2020. It previously operated in the San Francisco Ferry Building from 2022 to 2024.

They announced that they would be opening a location at Jack London Square in fall 2025, but as of December 2025, they are still not yet open.

Reem Assil is the chef. Her first cookbook, Arabiyya: Recipes from the Life of an Arab in Diaspora, was published in 2022. It was nominated for a 2023 IACP Award in the Chefs & Restaurants category.
