= Lucali =

Pizzeria in Brooklyn, New York, U.S.

Coordinates: 40°40′54.7″N 74°0′1.3″W

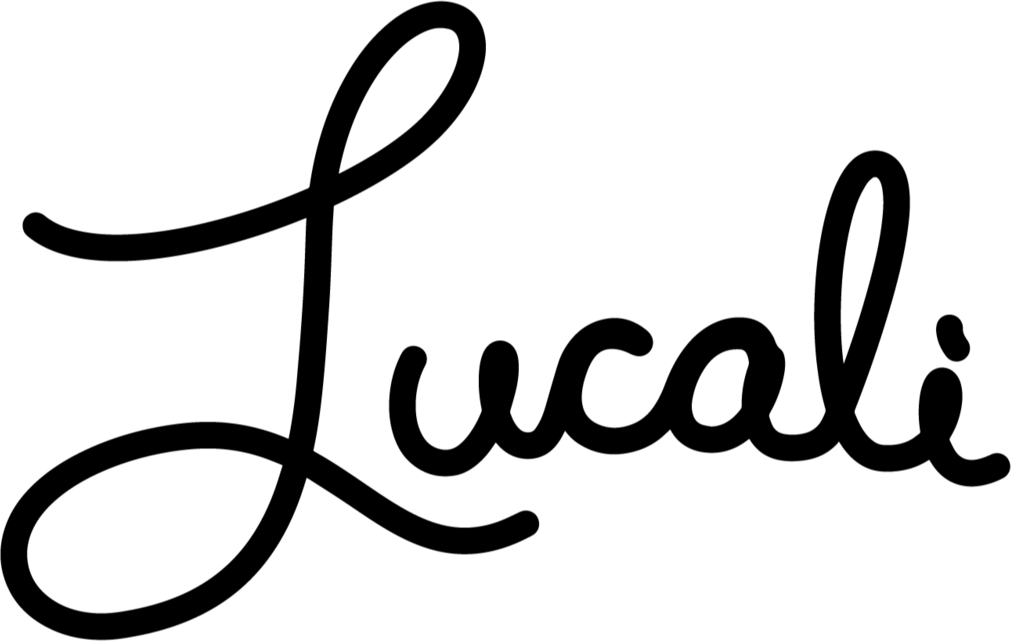
- Interactive map of Lucali

Restaurant information
- Established: 2006
- Owner: Mark Iacono
- Food type: Italian pizzeria
- Location: 575 Henry St, Brooklyn, New York City, 11231, United States
- Website: lucali.com

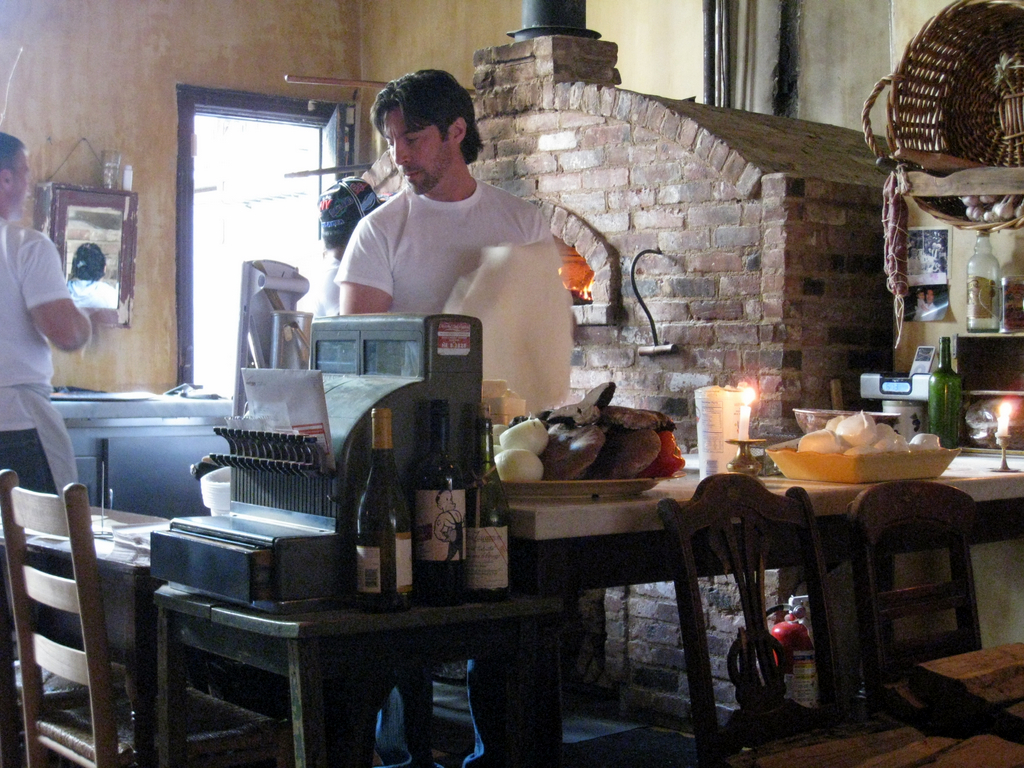
Mark Iacono making pizza at Lucali in 2008

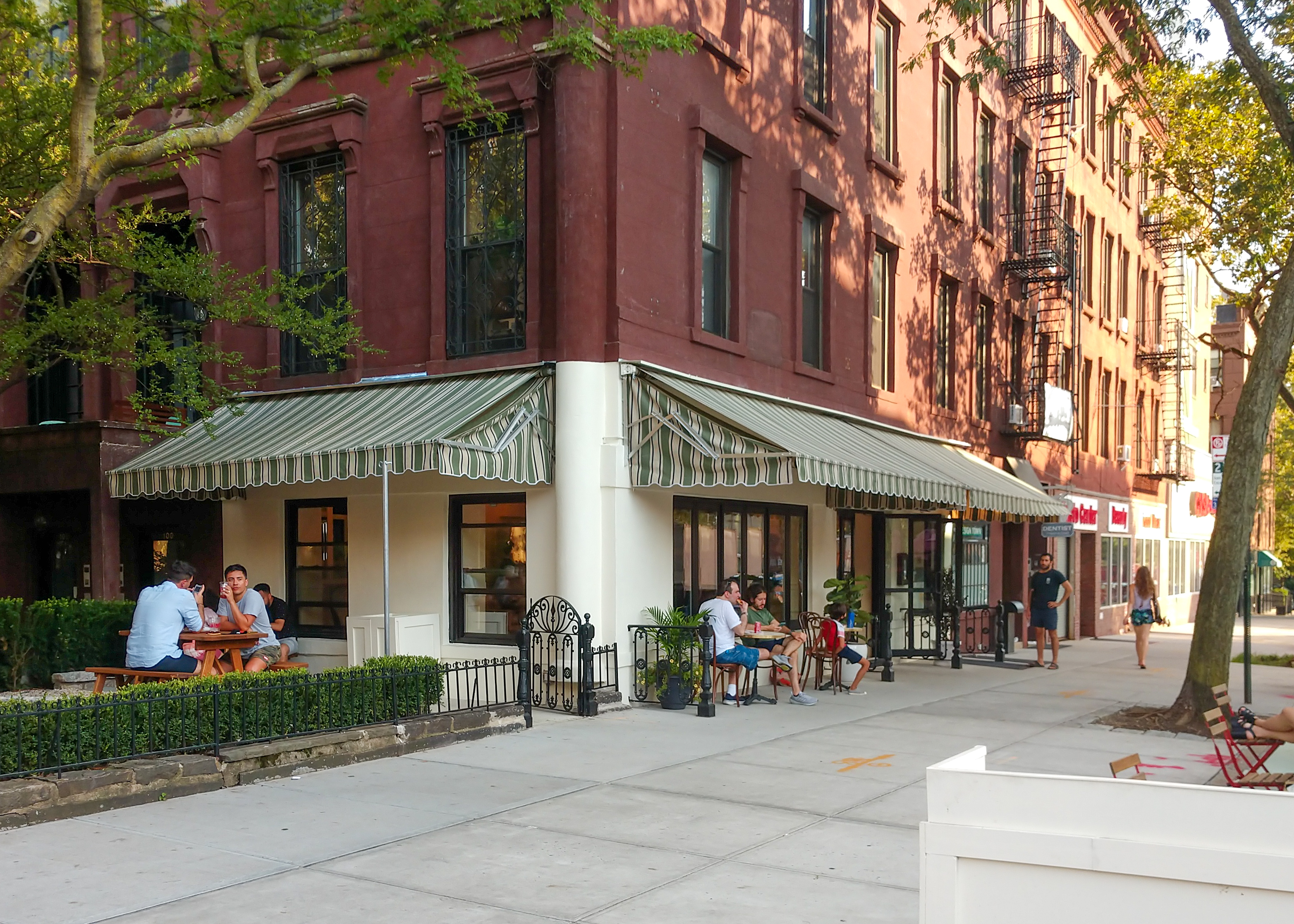
Exterior of Baby Luc's, opened in 2021

Lucali is a pizzeria founded by Mark Iacono in 2006, located in Carroll Gardens, Brooklyn, New York City. The pizzeria serves brick oven pizza and calzones.

== History ==
Lucali was founded by Mark Iacono in 2006 in the Carroll Gardens neighborhood of Brooklyn. There was a candy store, Louie's Candy Store, across the street from where his father was born that Iacono, a Carroll Gardens native, frequented in his youth. After Louie died, his wife Rosemary put the place, at 575 Henry Street, up for rent. Iacono decided to lease it to open a pizzeria. The name Lucali comes both from Louie the candy store owner and Iacono's daughter, Kalista.

He had no experience making pizza prior to opening the restaurant. He mainly wanted to avoid a beloved neighborhood space from being snatched up and transformed into something bland. He initially wanted to open a traditional neighborhood New York–style slice shop, but wound up with a sit-down restaurant. He learned from watching other New York pizzaiolos, like the way Dom DeMarco of Di Fara Pizza adds a lot of fresh basil to his pies. After experimenting until he was happy with the results, he opened the doors in 2006.

In 2013, Lucali expanded to Miami Beach in South Florida. In July 2021, Iacono opened a slice shop two blocks away from Lucali, on Court Street, called Baby Luc's.

== Description ==
Lucali is a sit-down brick-oven pizzeria that seats 30 people. New York Times called it "a luxury restaurant disguised as a pizza joint", decorated with "carefully curated oldness". Pizzas are made on a marble counter in front of guests on what New York Magazine called "a workstation that looks like a stage."

The most popular pizza is the plain pie, with tomato sauce, three kinds of cheese, and a lot of fresh basil on a thin, light, chewy crust. While best known for pizza, it also serves calzones.

Unlike many other pizzerias in New York, Lucali does not take reservations on the phone or via the internet, does not deliver, and does not serve slices.

== Reception ==
Lucali is frequently named as one of the best pizzerias in Brooklyn or New York City.

The restaurant received entertainment news coverage when Jay-Z and Beyoncé opted for dinner at Lucali over attending the 54th Grammy Awards ceremony. It also receive substantial coverage after Kendrick Lamar mentioned the pizzaria in his diss track "6:16 in LA."

Its method of seating has itself received press coverage. The Infatuation wrote that "going to Lucali is a pain in the ass", worth it only because it has "the best pizza in New York City." Guests are encouraged to arrive early and the restaurant begins creating a list of names at 5:00 p.m. Then they leave and wait until they receive a phone call. There is an assumption that patrons are either locals themselves or would spend time at another local business while they wait. Patrons may often wait up to two hours for a seat at the restaurant.

Lucali's success led several people, including the owner and his family, to discuss the gentrification of the Brooklyn neighborhood. When Iacono grew up in Carroll Gardens, it was a working-class neighborhood struggling with crime. The restaurant has roots in the neighborhood, but is also frequented by the rich and famous.

== See also ==
- List of Italian restaurants
- List of restaurants in New York City
