= The Pizza Show =

Television series

- Country of origin: United States
- Original language: English
- No. of seasons: 3
- No. of episodes: 19

Original release
- Network: Viceland

The Pizza Show is a television series about pizza broadcast by Viceland starring Frank Pinello.
