= 2 Bros. Pizza =

Pizza chain in New York City, US

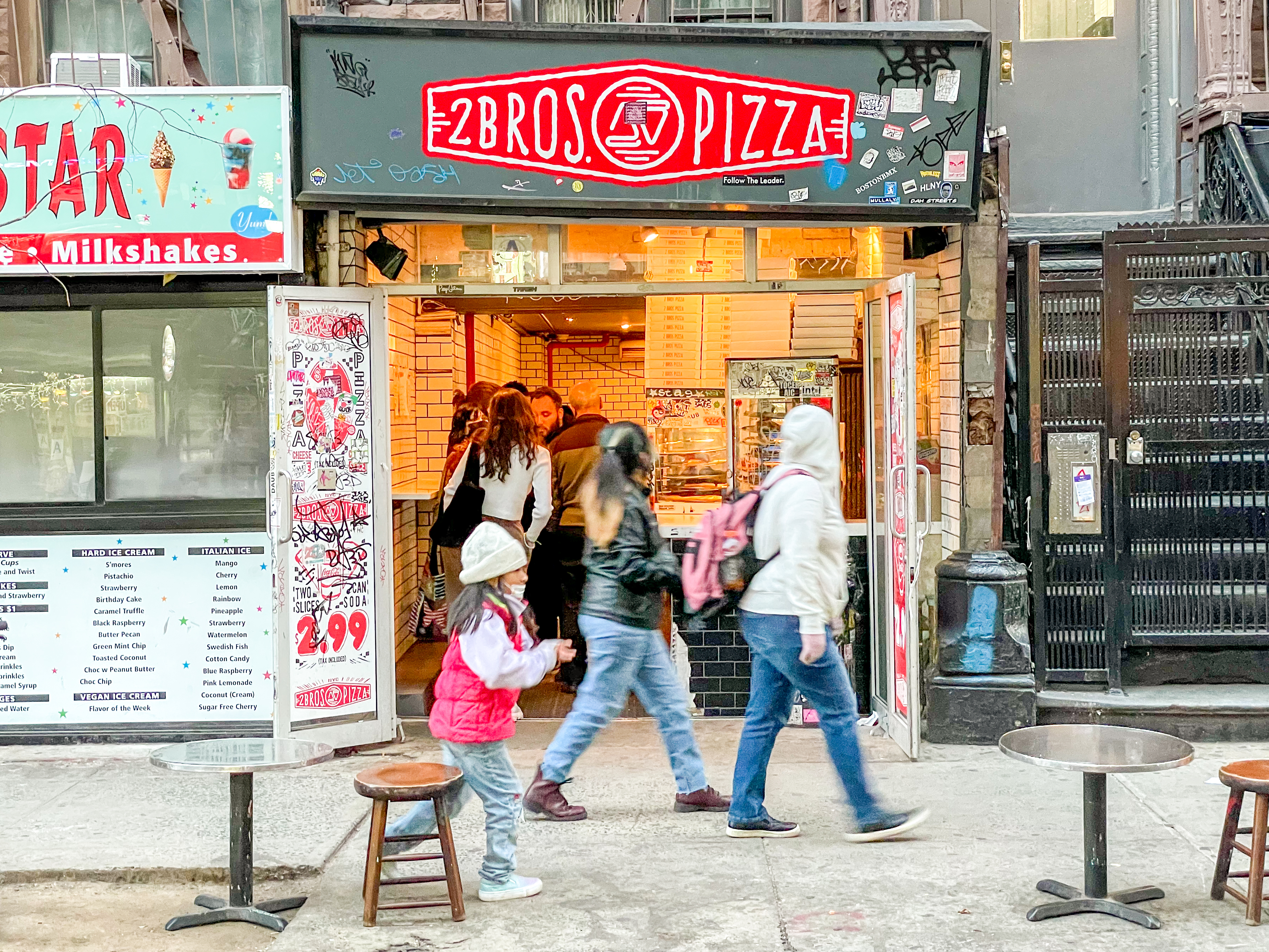
2 Bros. Pizza, established in 2008, increased the popularity of the dollar slice

2 Bros. Pizza is a New York City–based pizza chain known for its affordable, fast‑service pizza slices, particularly its iconic $1 pizza slice. Established in 2007 by brothers Eli and Oren Halali, the chain quickly became emblematic of New York's "dollar slice" culture, offering budget‑friendly options to students, tourists, and late‑night patrons.

== History ==
The inaugural 2 Bros. Pizza location opened in 2007 on St. Mark's Place in East Village, Manhattan. The concept of providing $1 slices resonated with New Yorkers, especially during the 2008 financial crisis, leading to rapid expansion across the city. By 2010, 2 Bros. had multiple outlets, contributing to the proliferation of dollar‑slice pizzerias in New York City.

In 2012, 2 Bros. engaged in a notable price war with a neighboring pizzeria, resulting in a temporary reduction of slice prices to 75 cents. This price war concluded with both establishments agreeing to stabilize prices at $1.

== Menu ==
2 Bros. Pizza's menu centers around New York–style pizza slices, with the classic cheese slice being the staple. Over time, the menu has expanded to include pepperoni slices, whole pies, garlic knots, and soft drinks. The chain is recognized for maintaining consistent quality while keeping prices accessible.

== Pricing changes and economic impact ==
In March 2023, 2 Bros. Pizza increased the price of its dollar slice from $1 to $1.50 across all locations, citing rising costs of ingredients and inflationary pressures. Co‑owner Eli Halali explained that the cost of cheese alone accounted for approximately 40% of ingredient expenses, making the $1 price point unsustainable.

The price hike marked the end of an era for the dollar slice, a symbol of affordable dining in New York City.

== Cultural significance ==
In April 2025, food delivery service Seamless partnered with over 40 pizzerias, including 2 Bros. Pizza, to temporarily reintroduce the $1 pizza slice as part of a promotional campaign. The initiative aimed to revive a cherished aspect of New York's culinary culture amidst rising food costs. The promotion was well‑received by both long‑time patrons and new customers, highlighting the enduring appeal of the $1 slice in New York City's food culture.
