= Rizzo's Fine Pizza =

Pizzeria in Astoria, Queens & Manhattan, New York City

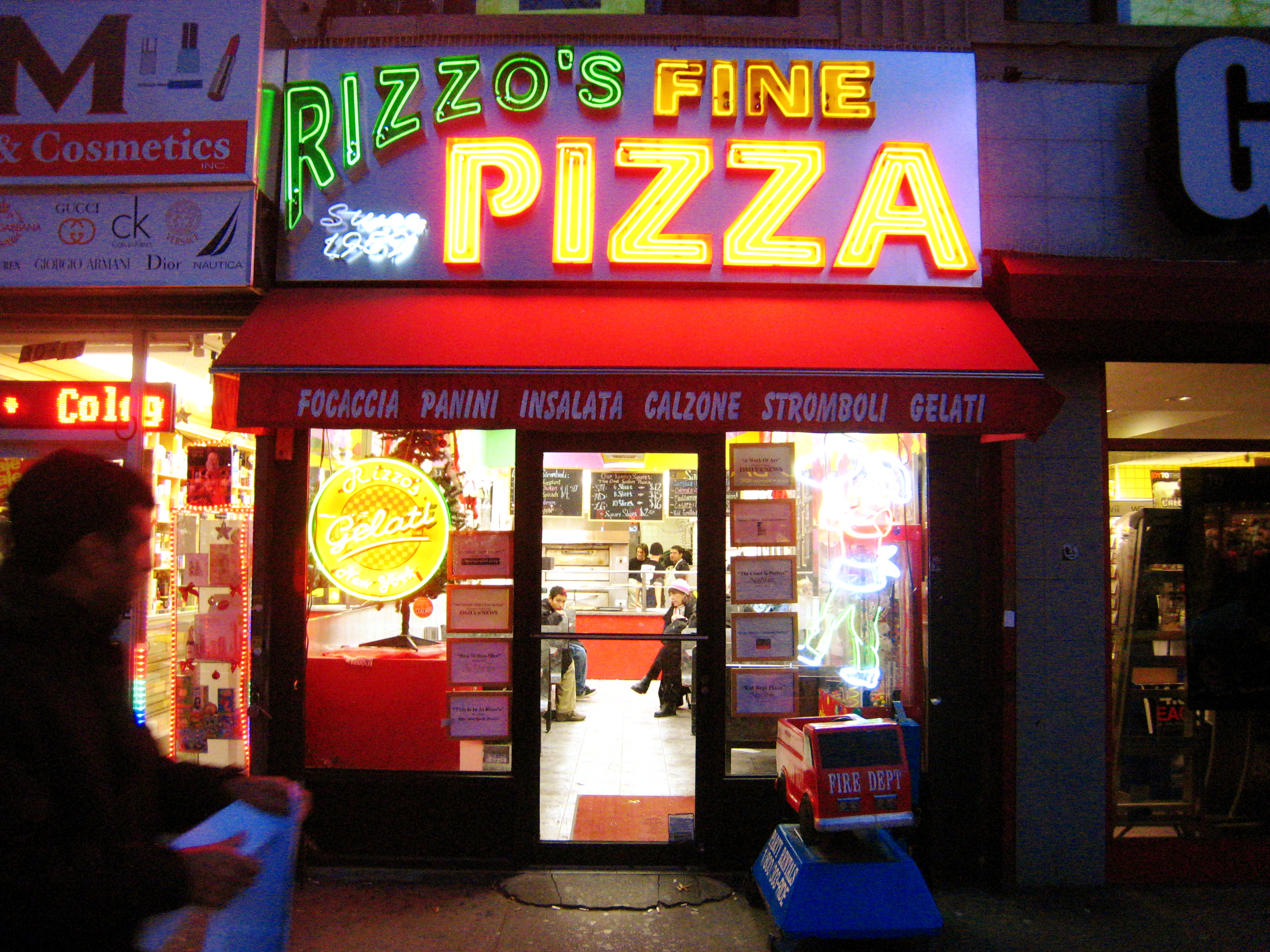
- Rizzo's Fine Pizza exterior

Restaurant information
- Established: 1959
- Location: New York City, New York County, New York, United States

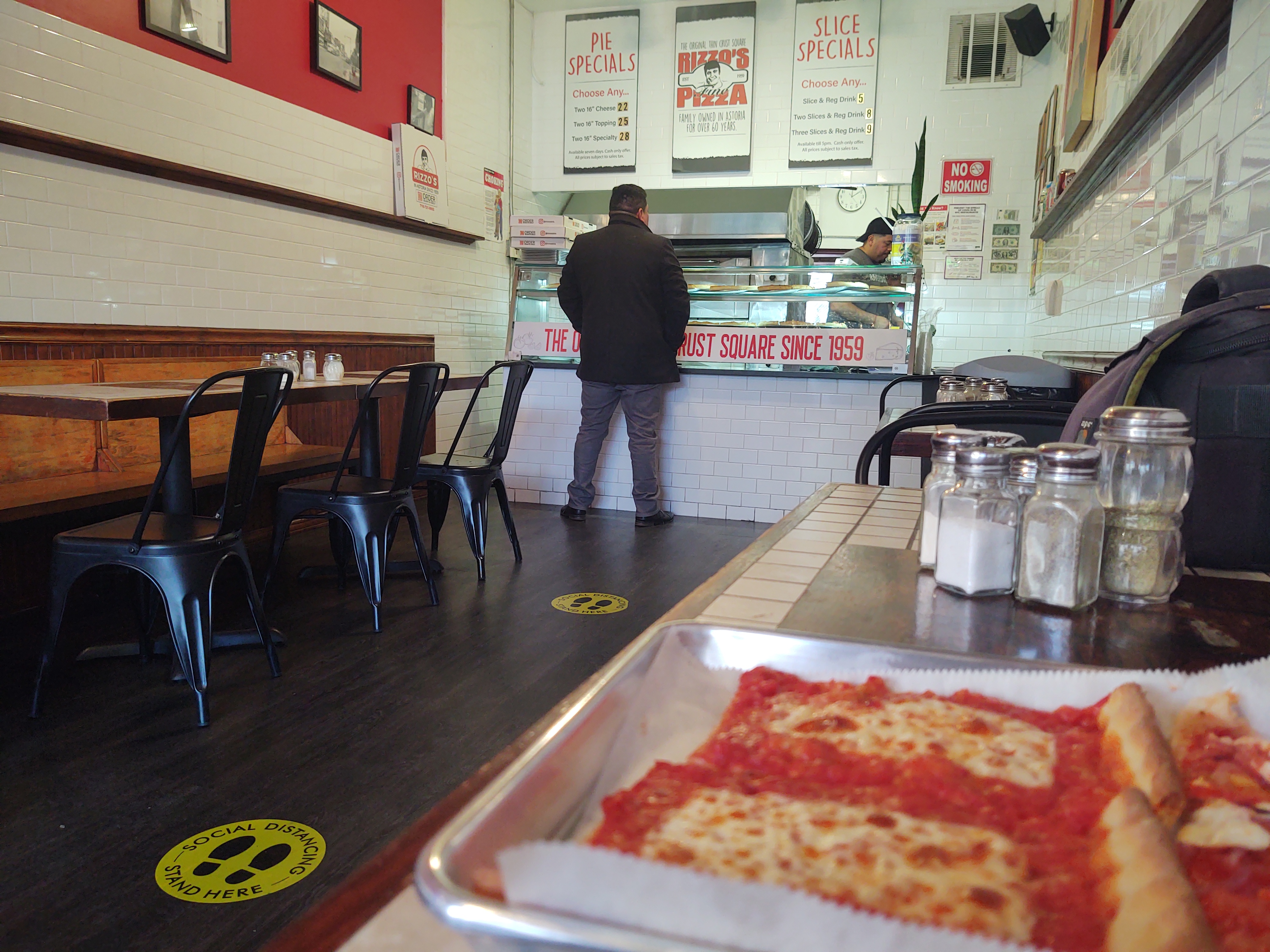
Interior

Rizzo's Fine Pizza is a pizzeria in New York City, with locations at 31-33 Steinway Street in Astoria, Queens and 17 Clinton Street in Manhattan.

Rizzo's Fine Pizza is known for their thin-crusted, Sicilian-style, square pizza.
