= Una Pizza Napoletana =

Pizzeria in New York City, U.S.

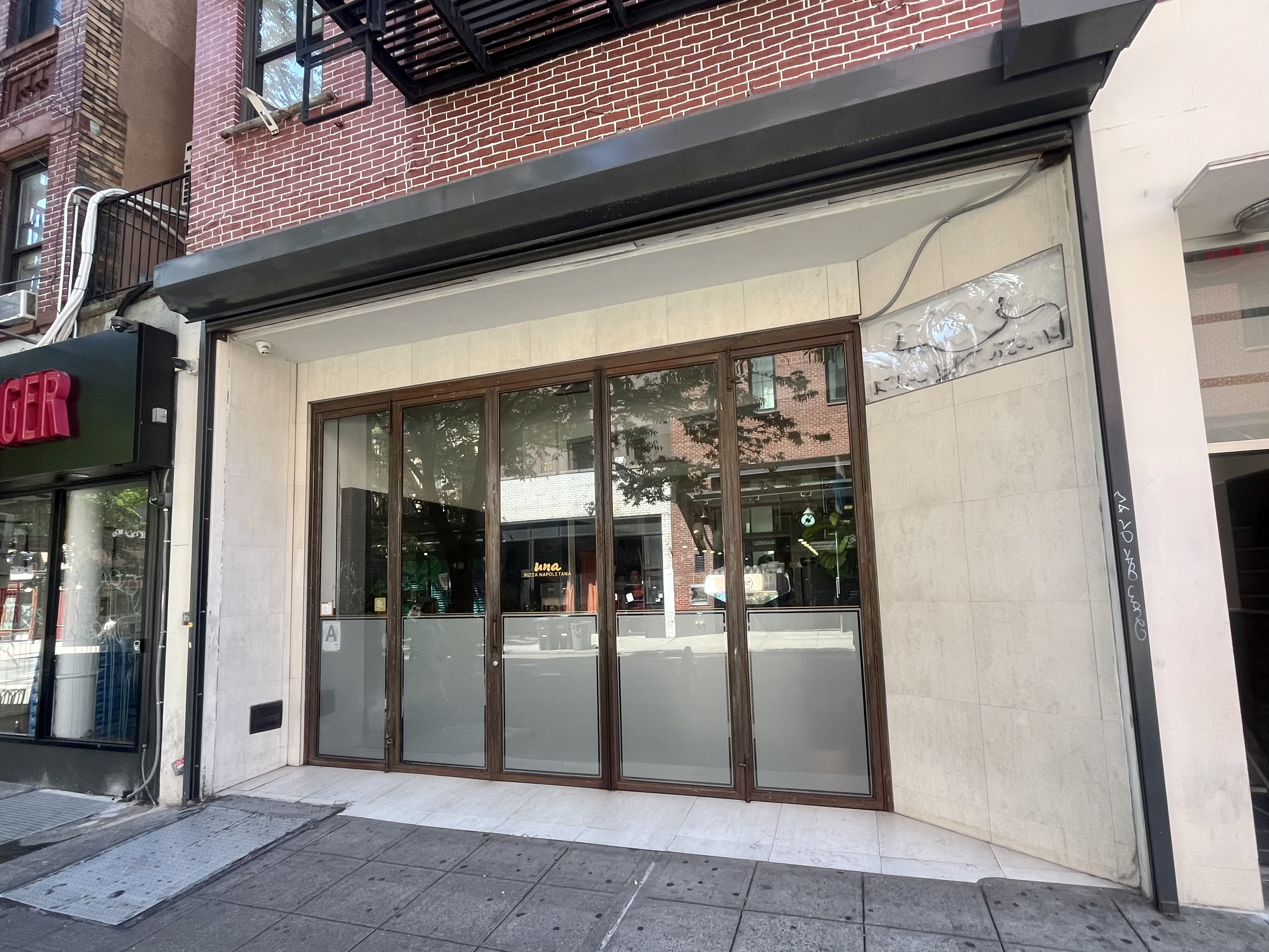
- The restaurant's exterior in 2024
- Interactive map of Una Pizza Napoletana

Restaurant information
- Location: 175 Orchard Street, New York City, New York, 10002, United States
- Coordinates: 40°43′18″N 73°59′19″W
- Website: unapizza.com

Una Pizza Napoletana is a pizzeria in New York City that specializes in Neapolitan pizza. The restaurant is owned and operated by Anthony Mangieri.
