= Scarr's Pizza =

Pizzeria in New York City

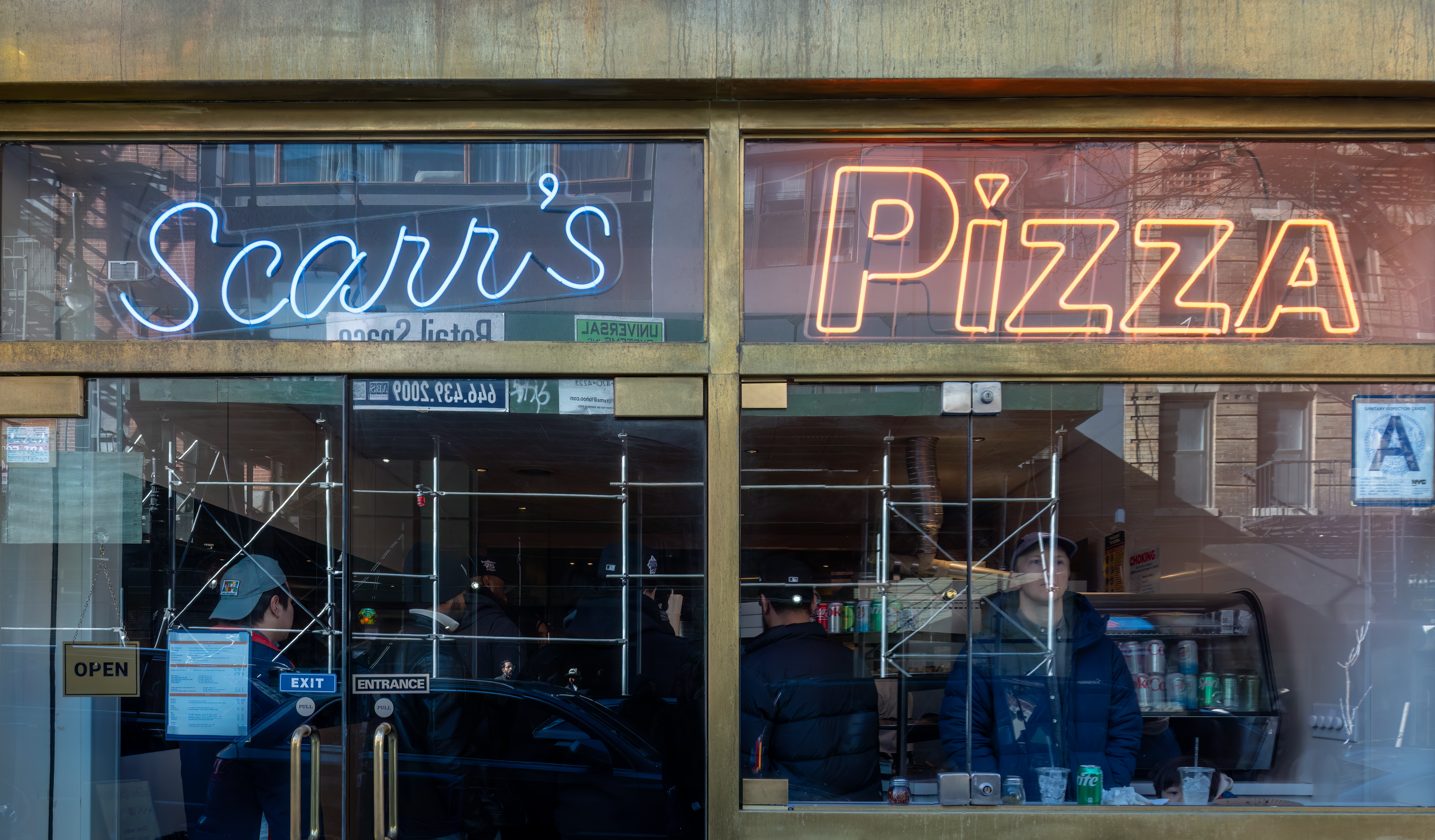
- Interactive map of Scarr's Pizza

Restaurant information
- Established: 2016
- Owner: Scarr Pimentel
- Location: 35 Orchard Street, New York City, New York County, New York, 10002, United States
- Coordinates: 40°42′57″N 73°59′30″W
- Website: ScarrsPizza.com

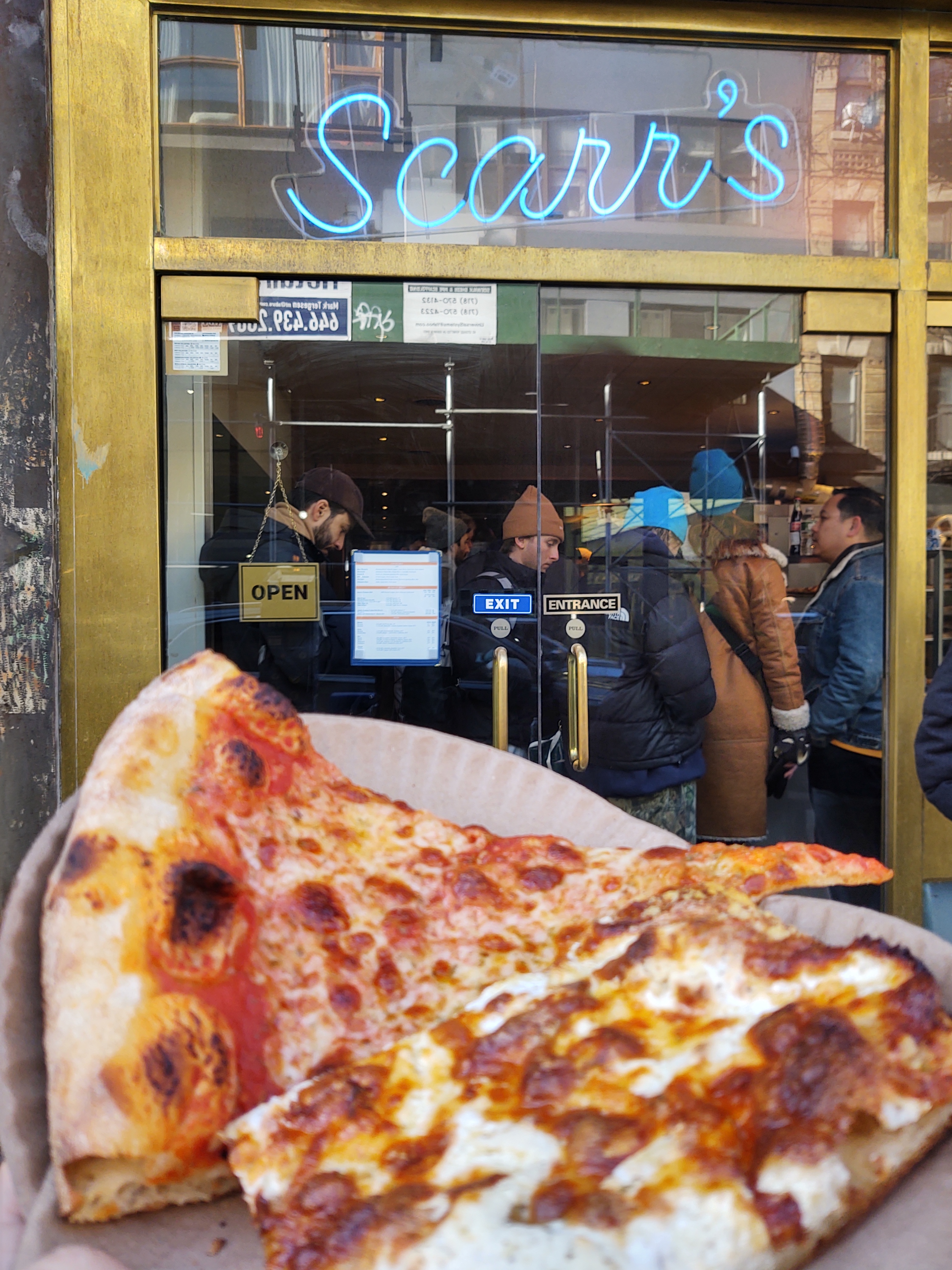
Pizza outside Scarr's

Scarr's Pizza is a pizzeria at 35 Orchard Street on the Lower East Side of Manhattan, New York City.

The restaurant was founded in 2016 by Scarr Pimentel, a New York native who learned to make pizza at Lombardi's.

The restaurant's staff mills some of the wheat for the restaurant's fermented crust in the pizzeria's basement daily, mixing it with flour from upstate New York in a compromise to keep up with demand. It is the only pizza-by-the-slice restaurant milling its own flour in New York, according to Serious Eats. Gothamist wrote that its cheese is a combination of three types of mozzarella and sauce is made fresh.

The restaurant sourced much of its decor from a bowling alley which, in combination with its wood paneled walls, and letter boards, is intended to recreate the diner-like aesthetic of neighborhood pizzerias from the 1970s or 1980s. Several reviewers praised the dough, cheese, sauce, and ingredient selection, and it was named one of the best pizza slices in New York by the New York Times, Gothamist, The New Yorker, and Serious Eats. In a mixed review by The Infatuation, Bryan Kim wrote that Scarr's works better if you think of it as a bar that serves pizza rather than expect a comfortable sit-down restaurant.

A second location in a food hall in Midtown Manhattan was planned, but was postponed due to the COVID-19 pandemic. In June 2023, the main location moved to a larger space across the street, from 22 to 35 Orchard Street.
