= Lenny's Pizza =

Pizzeria in Bensonhurst, Brooklyn, New York City

Coordinates: 40°36′18.2″N 73°59′55″W

Lenny’s Pizza
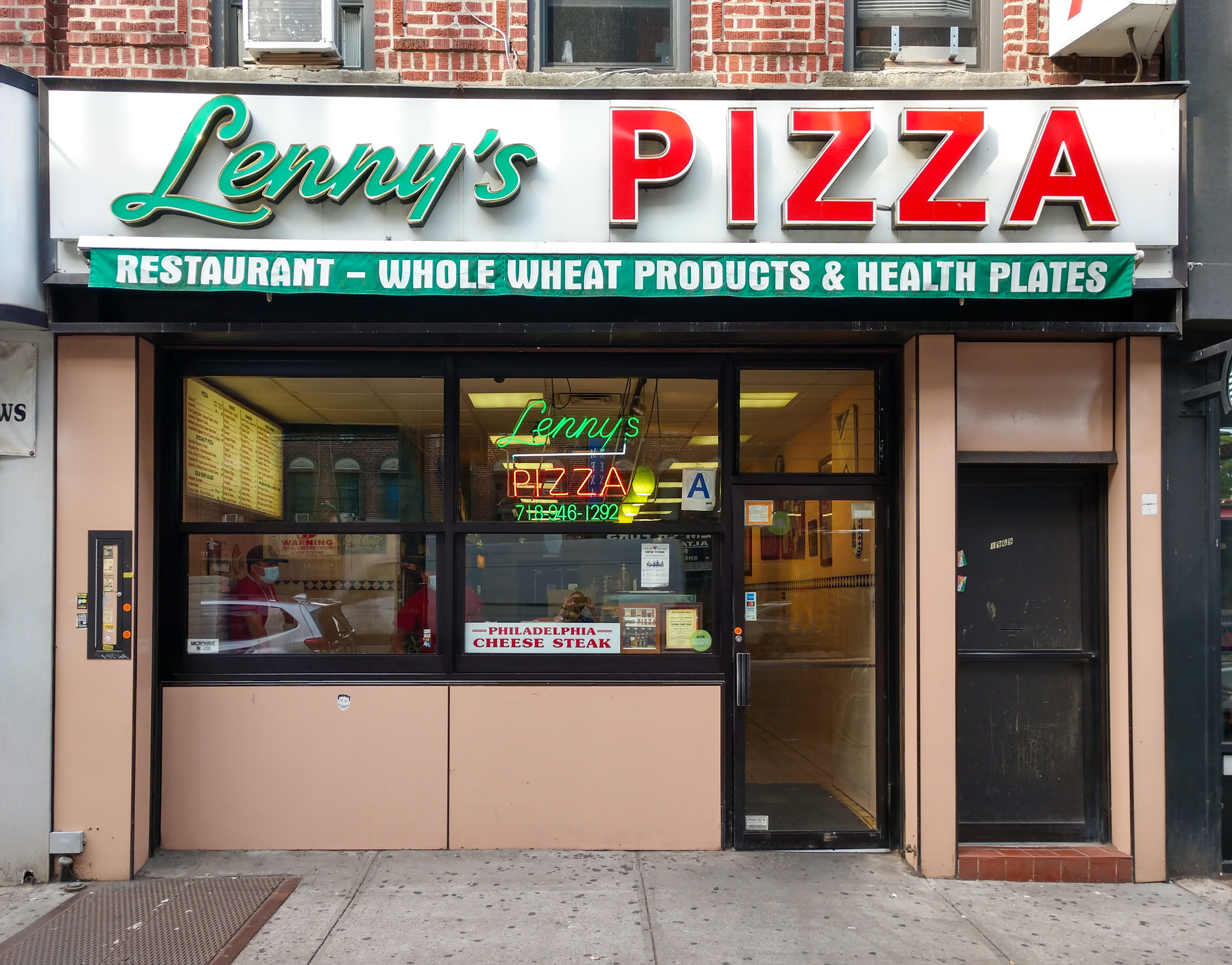
- Interactive map of Lenny’s Pizza

Restaurant information
- Established: 1953
- Closed: 2023
- Owner: Frank Giordano
- Head chef: Frank Giordano
- Location: 1969 86th Street, Brooklyn, New York, New York City, Kings County, New York, New York, United States

Lenny's Pizza was a New York City pizzeria in Bensonhurst, Brooklyn, established in 1953.

== History ==
Lenny's Pizza was founded in 1953, one of the first pizzerias in the neighborhood. Its namesake, "Lenny," owned the pizzeria for a couple years, then sold it. Sicilian native Frank Giordano, who owned part of Nino's Pizzeria in Bay Ridge, purchased the pizzeria in 1988. He ran it with his daughter Josephine until he announced his retirement in 2023.

The pizzeria is notable for being the location where John Travolta in Saturday Night Fever orders two slices. In the movie, Travolta's character eats the slices with one stacked on top of the other, leading the restaurant to offer a "double-decker" style pizza named after the actor. On February 18, 2023, it was announced on Twitter by the owner's daughter that Lenny's Pizza will be closing and serving its last slice the next day on February 19, 2023, at 10 pm.
