= Kesté =

Coordinates: 40.731531°N 74.002967°W

Kesté Pizza & Vino

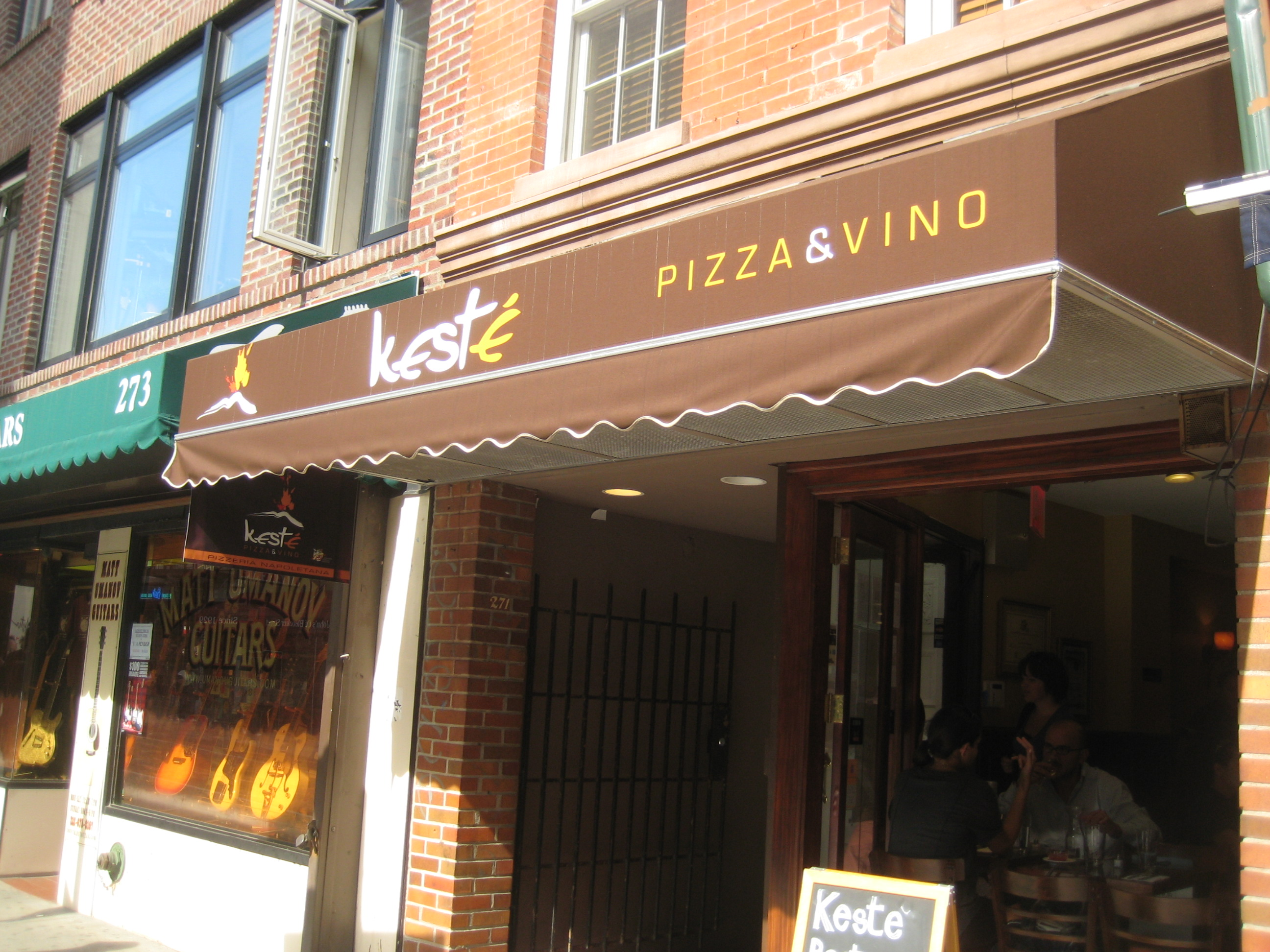
- The exterior of Kesté Pizza & Vino
- Interactive map of Kesté Pizza & Vino

Restaurant information
- Established: 2009
- Owner: Roberto Caporuscio
- Food type: Italian pizzeria
- Location: 271 Bleecker St, New York City, Manhattan, 10014, United States
- Website: www.kestepizzeria.com

Kesté Pizza & Vino, also known as Kesté Pizzeria or simply Keste's, is a pizzeria, located in Manhattan, that serves Neapolitan-style wood-fired brick oven pizza.

== History ==
Kesté's was founded in 2009 by Roberto Caporuscio, who works alongside his daughter, Giorgia. The original location was located on Bleecker Street next to John's. The restaurant was rated as the fourth best pizza in the United States and second best in New York City.

New York Magazine and Food Network Magazine named Kesté's the best pizza in New York. The Bleecker Street restaurant had permanently closed due to the COVID-19 pandemic by October 2021, although there remained a secondary location open in the Financial District. Wrote TimeOut about the Bleecker Street location, "it ushered in a wave of thin pies with puffy pockets of air and tiny black blisters across the city."

== See also ==
- List of Italian restaurants
- List of restaurants in New York City
