= L&B Spumoni Gardens =

Coordinates: 40°35′41″N 73°58′52.5″W

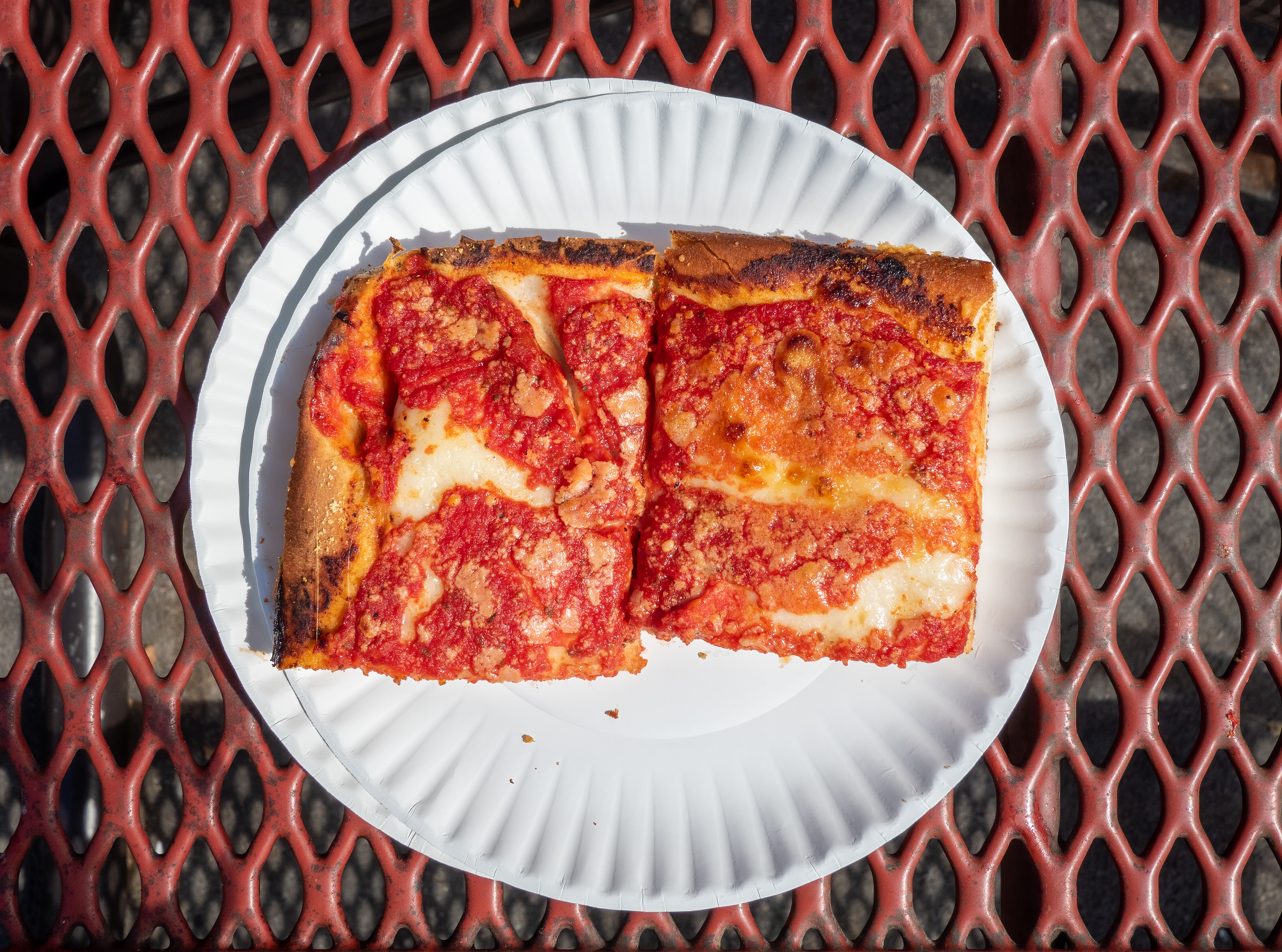
- Two slices of Sicilian pizza at L&B Spumoni Gardens
- Interactive map of L&B Spumoni Gardens

Restaurant information
- Established: 1939
- Food type: Italian-American
- Location: 2725 86th Street, Brooklyn, Kings, New York, 11223, USA
- Reservations: Yes
- Website: spumonigardens.com

L&B Spumoni Gardens is an Italian-American pizzeria-restaurant in the Gravesend neighborhood of Brooklyn in New York City. Originally conceived as an ice and spumoni stand prior to World War II, it grew during the mid-1950s into a full-scale pizzeria known primarily today for its Sicilian pizza and ices. The restaurant has been featured on the show Man v. Food. NY Eater critic Robert Sietsema considers L&B Spumoni Gardens a must-try Italian American restaurant in Brooklyn. They were featured on Andrew Zimmern’s show The Zimmern List.

== History ==
Founder Ludovico Barbati came to the United States in 1917 from Torella dei Lombardi, Italy. In 1938, Barbati sold Spumoni and Italian Ice from a horse and wagon. In 1939, he purchased a vacant property on 86th Street to make the spumoni and ice. By the mid-1950s, the location came to be L&B Spumoni Gardens, with the spumoni factory, a pizzeria and a luncheonette all on site.

In 2016, one of the co-owners, Louis Barbati, 61, was murdered outside his home in Dyker Heights. In 2019, another co-owner, Patricia Barbati Coffey, 56, died after a seven-year battle with ALS.

The restaurant opened a second location in the Dumbo neighborhood of Brooklyn in December 2024.

== See also ==
- List of restaurants in New York City
