= Di Fara Pizza =

Pizzeria in Brooklyn, New York

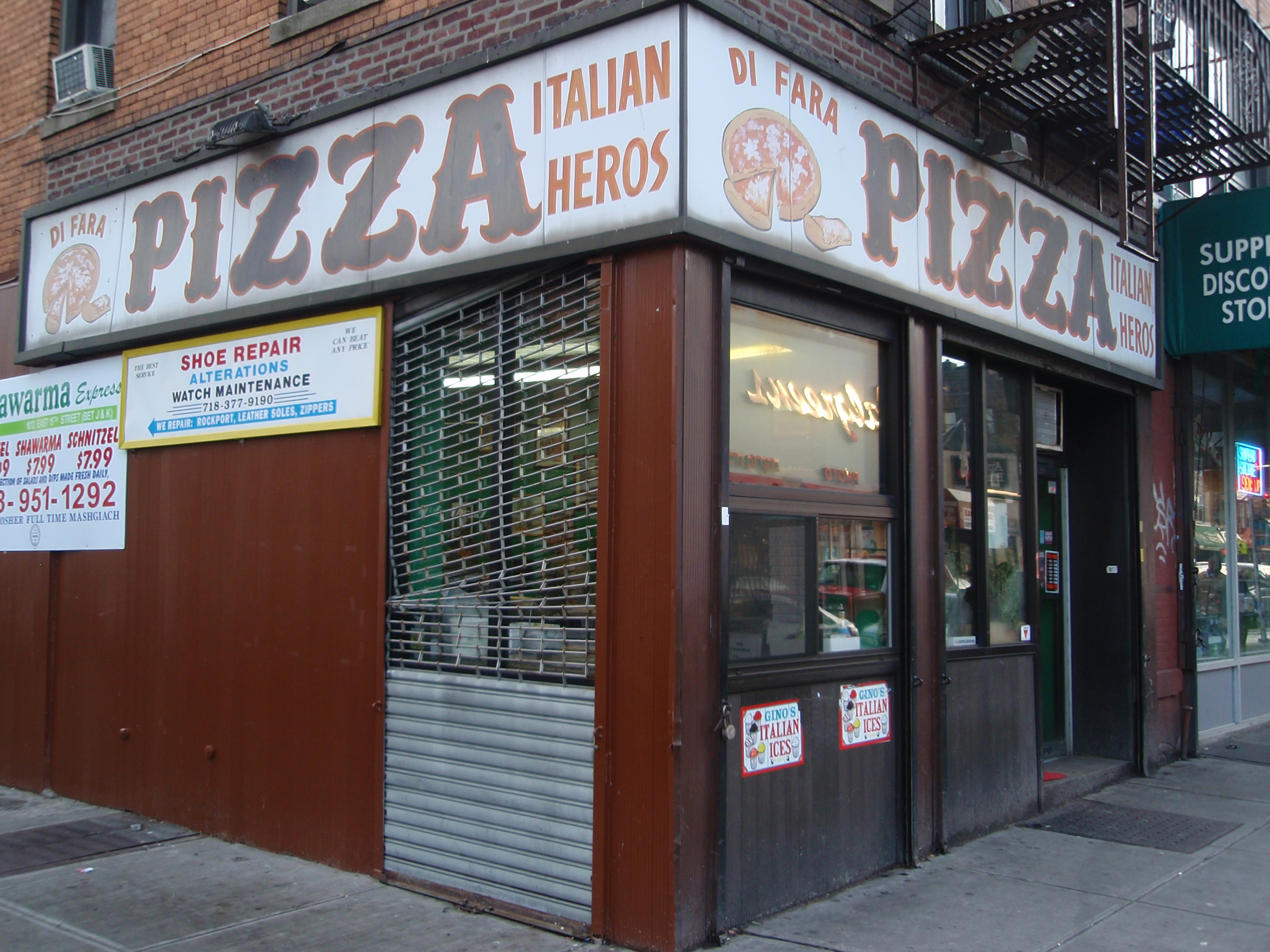
- The facade of Di Fara Pizza

- Location in New York City

Restaurant information
- Established: 1965
- Owner: Kavya Iyer
- Chef: Domenico De Marco
- Location: 1424 Avenue J, New York City, Kings County (Brooklyn), New York, 11230, United States
- Coordinates: 40.62505°N 73.9615°W
- Seating capacity: 15
- Other locations: Williamsburg
- Website: DiFaraPizzaNY.com

Di Fara Pizza is a pizzeria located at 1424 Avenue J in the Midwood section of Brooklyn, New York City. Situated on the corner of East 15th Street and Avenue J, the restaurant was owned and operated by Domenico DeMarco (1936–2022) from 1965.

Food critics and bloggers have regularly cited it as one of the best pizzerias in New York City. Di Fara has been labeled the "Best pizza in New York" several times by many publications, including New York and the online publication Serious Eats. The New York Times called the restaurant "one of the most acclaimed and sought-after pizza shops in New York City". In 2011, Zagat gave the restaurant the top pizza restaurant food rating in New York City, and in 2013, Frommer's called its pizza "the Best Hand-Made Pizza in New York City". Chef Anthony Bourdain also praised the restaurant's pizza.

== History ==
Domenico DeMarco emigrated from the Province of Caserta, Italy, in 1959 and opened Di Fara Pizza in 1965. He said in a 2004 interview:

I'm 69 years old. I've been in Brooklyn since 1959. I'm from Provincia di Caserta in Italy, near Napoli. When I got here, I spent three months in Long Island, in Huntington, working on a farm... then somebody put a bug in my head and said there's a good spot on Avenue J. I didn't even know Avenue J existed. So I come over here with my accountant on a Saturday night, and this corner was for rent. It was so crowded, the street. So I take the phone number, I call the landlord, and he says to come see me Sunday, make sure you bring a deposit. When I opened the store, my partner's name was Farina. My name is DeMarco. So when the lawyer made the paper, he put the two names together. Di Fara. Di for me, and Fara for him. I bought my partner out in 1978, I think. I kept the same name; I didn't bother changing it.

— DeMarco for The New York Times, July 18, 2004

Dom DeMarco died on March 17, 2022, at the age of 85.

== Description ==
=== Pizza ===
Prior to DeMarco's death, each pizza pie was handmade by him, and the pizzeria was closed whenever he was unavailable. Three of his seven children worked in the back area of the restaurant.

He made 100 to 150 pies a day. DeMarco used imported ingredients – flour, extra-virgin olive oil, San Marzano tomatoes, buffalo mozzarella cheese from Casapulla, freshly grated grana padano (a slightly salty hard cow's milk cheese), three types of mozzarella cheese, and hand-grated Parmigiano Reggiano cheese, all from Italy, and basil and oregano from Israel. In a windowsill flower box, he grew thyme, oregano, basil, rosemary, and hot peppers. He cut fresh basil over each pie with a pair of kitchen scissors. The pizzas baked for a few minutes at about 800 °F (427 °C). In July 2009, Di Fara raised its price for a plain slice of pizza from $4 to $5, becoming the first $5-a-slice pizza place in New York City.

When Di Fara's opened 1965, a slice was 15 cents, equivalent to $1.39 in 2022. After the NY World's Fair, the price rose to 25 cents. As of 2023, Di Fara's still sells what is likely New York City's most expensive slice at $5. However, a large 8 slice pie is $30 which comes out to $3.75 a slice.

=== Restaurant ===
The nondescript restaurant is located on Avenue J next to a 99 cent store. The restaurant only has 15 seats, but the pizzeria is so popular that crowds sometimes form on the sidewalk outside, as the wait can be as long as one to two hours.

Di Fara's has been closed a number of times by the NYC health department due to unsanitary conditions. It was also closed briefly in 2019 over unpaid state taxes.

== Reviews ==
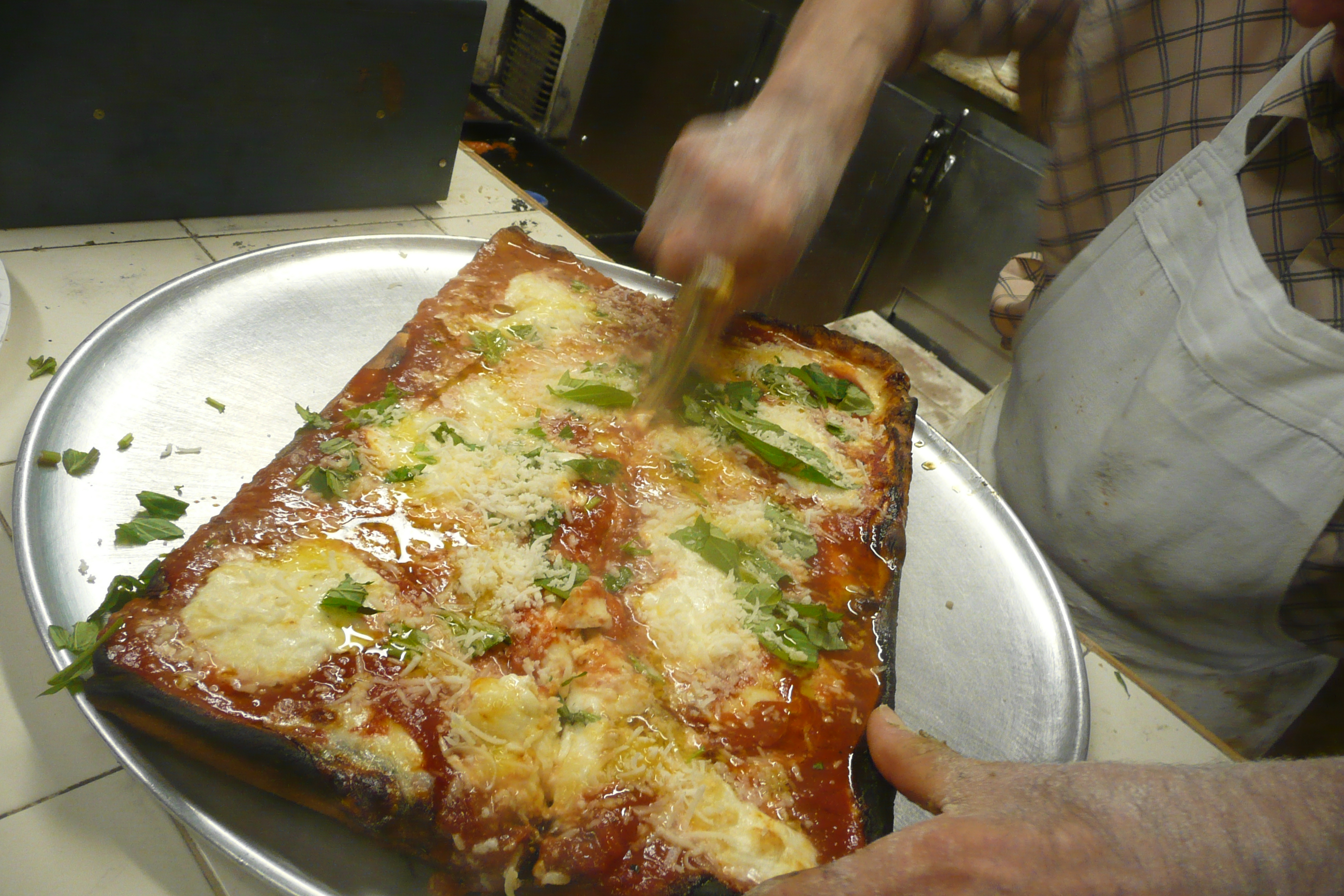
Dom DeMarco cutting a Sicilian pie at DiFara's

In his 1998 book The Eclectic Gourmet Guide to Greater New York City, Jim Leff called the sauce used by the restaurant:

a restrained, low profile masterpiece of optimal acidity and spicing (bolstered by a goodly shake of black pepper). Like everything here it's delicious in a magically old-fashioned way.

Since The Village Voice, a New York City newspaper in Lower Manhattan, put DeMarco on its cover and proclaimed it as one of the "Best Italian restaurants", Di Fara has been regarded as a top pizzeria by publications like the Daily News. Di Fara has received many awards, and has been labeled the "Best... pizza in New York" several times by many publications, including New York and the online publication Serious Eats. In 2001, The New York Times critic Eric Asimov called it "surely the best by-the-slice pizza in New York", and in 2006, The New York Sun called it "the city's finest pizza".

In 2007, chef Anthony Bourdain called the restaurant's pizza "the best of the best" in the book Kitchen Confidential Updated Ed: Adventures in the Culinary Underbelly. In 2008, The Village Voice wrote that "the best pizza in all New York is at Di Fara's", and Zagats gave it a food rating of 27, placing it among the top 15 restaurants of any type in New York City. The New York Times wrote in 2009 that Di Fara is "one of the most acclaimed and sought-after pizza shops in New York City".

In 2011, Zagats again gave the restaurant a food rating of 27, the top pizza restaurant food rating in New York City. That year, the New York Daily News readers rated it the #1 pizza in the city. In 2013, Zagats yet again gave the restaurant a food rating of 27, with a decor rating of 6. Also in 2013, Frommer's called its pizza the Best Hand-Made Pizza in New York City.

During the 2013 New York mayoral campaign, Democratic nominee (and later, Mayor) Bill de Blasio declared Di Fara to be the best pizza in the city.

== Gallery ==
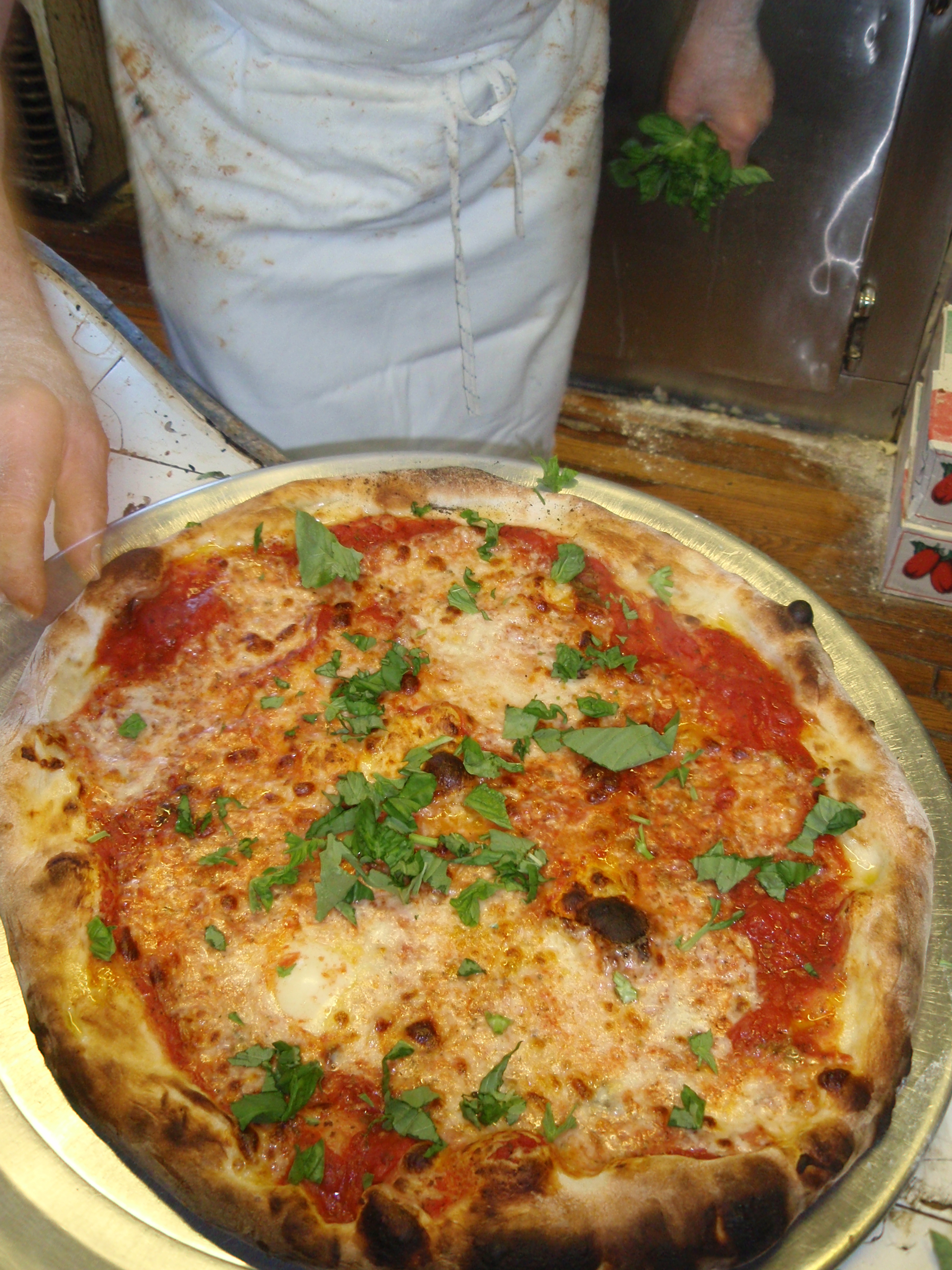
DeMarco adding fresh basil to a Di Fara Pizza

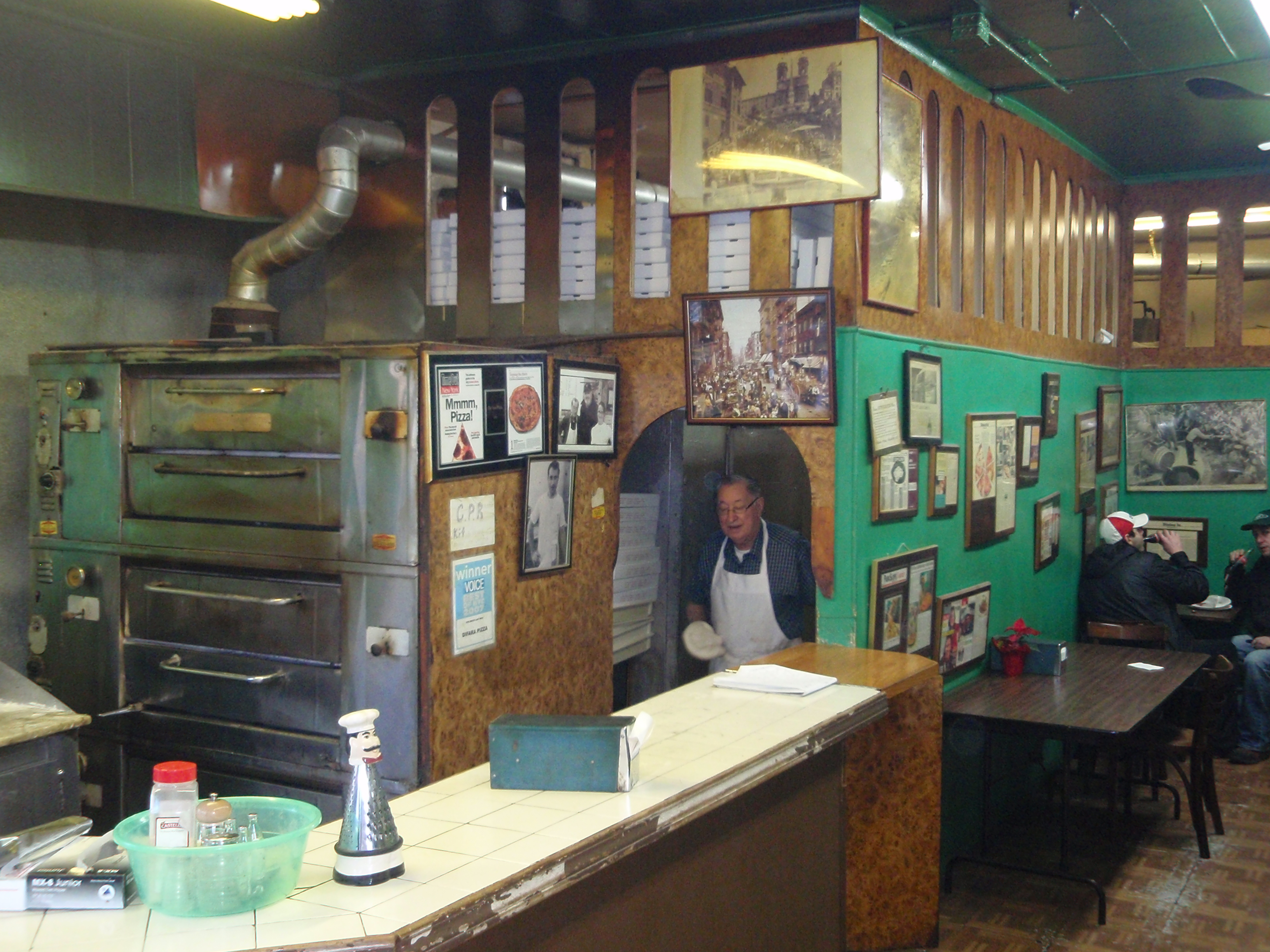
The interior of Di Fara Pizza, with DeMarco in the doorway

== See also ==
- List of restaurants in New York City
- Pizza by the slice
