= Pizzaiolo =

Person responsible for preparing and cooking pizzas

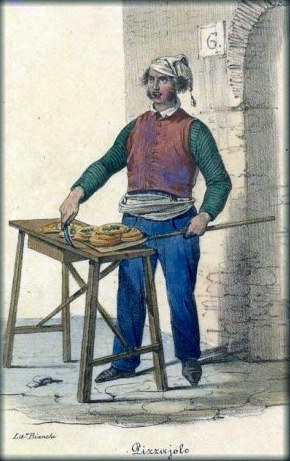
Lithograph of a pizzaiolo (Milan, 1830)

A pizzaiolo is any person dedicated to the preparation or sale of pizzas, generally in a pizzeria. The culinary practice originated in the city of Naples, Italy. It has been practiced since the 16th century and has been passed down through generations. With an estimated 3,000 artisans, it serves as a source of livelihood.

There are three categories of pizzaiolo: master pizzaiolo, pizzaiolo, and baker. A master pizzaiolo, or masto in the local Neapolitan language, is someone who has mastered all stages and is responsible for nurturing the next generation of pizzaiuoli. A masto can also perform pizza art in public. Beneath the masto is the guaglione, or young pizzaiolo. This person follows the master's body movements and ensures the art of becoming a master. Lastly, the baker is responsible for baking the pizza in a wood-fired oven (also called pampuglie) and has the ability to distinguish the wood needed and how to manage it so that the resulting pizza is perfect.

In practice, pizzaiolo involves four stages to produce a pizza. The first stage is rolling the dough and then forming it into a ball, called staglio. The second is to stretch (ammaccatura) and rotate the dough until it can be given pizza toppings. This term is called schiaffo or when the dough becomes wide and elastic. Next, the master pizzaiolo spreads tomato sauce and the remaining ingredients are sprinkled from the center outwards in a clockwise direction. The final stage is to put the pizza into the wood-fired oven and rotate it with a pizza shovel. The shovel is used to protect the hands from the heat of the oven.

== UNESCO recognition ==
The campaign for pizzaiolo to be listed as a UNESCO-recognized cultural heritage was ongoing from 2009 to 2017. After years of campaigning, UNESCO finally granted Italy's request in 2017 by designating pizzaiolo as an Italian Intangible Cultural Heritage of Humanity. The decision was ratified on Jeju Island, South Korea, on December 7, 2017. The Italian Minister of Agriculture, Food and Forestry, Maurizio Martina, responded to the designation by tweeting "Victory!", while the previous Minister of Agriculture, Pecoraro Scanio, uploaded a video of the victory. The following day, members of the Pizzaioli Coldiretti Acrobats celebrated the UNESCO designation by performing a pizza-twirling performance in Naples.

The success of the recognition of pizzaiolo as an intangible cultural heritage by UNESCO is inseparable from the role of the Neapolitan Pizzaiuoli Association. The association, which was founded in 1988, actively runs a training academy, also known as a bottega, which accepts around 120 students each year. Success was also achieved through the establishment of the first international pizza museum in Italy in 2013 and the signature of a petition in support of the application for pizzaiolo as a world cultural heritage by around two million people. These led UNESCO to approve the Italian application proposal.
