= Wisconsin =

U.S. state

- State
- Flag Seal
- Nicknames: Badger State, America's Dairyland
- Motto: Forward
- Anthem: "On, Wisconsin!"
- Location of Wisconsin within the United States
- Country: United States
- Before statehood: Wisconsin Territory
- Admitted to the Union: May 29, 1848 (30th)
- Capital: Madison
- Largest city: Milwaukee
- Largest county or equivalent: Milwaukee County
- Largest metro and urban areas: Milwaukee

Government
  - Governor: Tony Evers (D)
  - Lieutenant Governor: Sara Rodriguez (D)
- Legislature: Wisconsin Legislature
  - Upper house: Senate
  - Lower house: Assembly
- Judiciary: Wisconsin Supreme Court
- U.S. senators: Ron Johnson (R); Tammy Baldwin (D)
- U.S. House delegation: 6 Republicans; 2 Democrats; (list)

Area
  - Total: 65,500 sq mi (169,640 km^{2})
  - Land: 54,153 sq mi (140,256 km^{2})
  - Water: 11,345 sq mi (29,384 km^{2}) 17%
  - Rank: 23rd

Dimensions
  - Length: 315 mi (507 km)
  - Width: 265 mi (427 km)
- Elevation: 1,050 ft (320 m)
- Highest elevation (Timms Hill): 1,952 ft (595 m)
- Lowest elevation (Lake Michigan): 577 ft (176 m)

Population (2026)
  - Total: ▲6,064,500
  - Rank: 21st
  - Density: 108.8/sq mi (42.0/km^{2})
  - Median household income: $74,600 (2,023)
  - Income rank: 26th
- Demonyms: Wisconsinite, Cheesehead (colloquial)

Language
  - Official language: None
  - Spoken language: English 90.7%; Spanish 5.0%; Other 4.3%
- Time zone: UTC– 06:00 (Central)
  - Summer (DST): UTC– 05:00 (CDT)
- USPS abbreviation: WI
- ISO 3166 code: US-WI
- Traditional abbreviation: Wis., Wisc.
- Latitude: 42° 30' N to 47° 05′ N
- Longitude: 86° 46′ W to 92° 54′ W
- Website: wisconsin.gov

Wisconsin (Note: /wɪˈskɒnsɪn/ wih-SKON-sin)) is a state in the Upper Midwest and Great Lakes regions of the United States. It borders Minnesota to the west, Iowa to the southwest, Illinois to the south, Lake Michigan to the east, Michigan to the northeast, and Lake Superior to the north. With a population of about 6 million and an area of about 65,500 square miles (170,000 km^{2}), Wisconsin is the 21st-largest state by population and the 23rd-largest by area. It is divided into 72 counties. The state's most populous city is Milwaukee, while its capital and second-most populous city is Madison. Other smaller urban areas include Green Bay, Kenosha, Racine, Appleton, and Eau Claire.

Wisconsin's geography is diverse, with dense forests in the north (including Chequamegon–Nicolet National Forest), rugged unglaciated hills in the western Driftless Area, and wooded plains, lowlands, and farms stretching from the interior east to Lake Michigan. Wisconsin has the third-longest Great Lakes coastline, after Ontario and Michigan. At the time of European contact, the area was inhabited by Algonquian and Siouan nations, and today it is home to eleven federally recognized tribes. Wisconsin was originally part of the Northwest Territory and was admitted as a state in 1848. Many European settlers entered the state during the 19th and early 20th centuries, predominantly from Germany and Scandinavia. Wisconsin remains a center of German American and Scandinavian American culture, particularly in its cuisine, with foods such as bratwurst and kringle.

Wisconsin is one of the nation's leading dairy producers and is known as "America's Dairyland"; it is particularly famous for its cheese. The state is also recognized for its breweries, a longstanding beer industry centered in Milwaukee, relatively permissive alcohol laws, and a prominent drinking culture. Its economy is dominated by manufacturing, healthcare, information technology, and agriculture—specifically dairy, cranberries, and ginseng. Tourism is also a major contributor to its economy. The gross domestic product in 2020 was $348 billion. Wisconsin is home to one UNESCO World Heritage Site, comprising two of the most significant buildings designed by Wisconsin-born architect Frank Lloyd Wright: his studio at Taliesin and his Jacobs I House. Since 2016, it has been considered a swing state in national and statewide elections; the Republican Party was founded in Wisconsin in 1854.

== Etymology ==
The word Wisconsin originates from the name given to the Wisconsin River by one of the Algonquian-speaking Native American groups living in the region at the time of European colonization. The French explorer Jacques Marquette was the first European to reach the Wisconsin River, arriving in 1673 and calling the river Meskousing (likely ᒣᔅᑯᐤᓯᣙ meskowsin) in his journal. Subsequent French writers changed the spelling from Meskousing to Ouisconsin, and over time this became the name for both the Wisconsin River and the surrounding lands. English speakers anglicized the spelling from Ouisconsin to Wisconsin when they began to arrive in large numbers during the early 19th century. The legislature of Wisconsin Territory made the current spelling official in 1845.

The Algonquian word for Wisconsin and its original meaning have both grown obscure. While interpretations vary, most implicate the river and the red sandstone that lines its banks. One leading theory holds that the name originated from the Miami word Meskonsing, meaning 'it lies red', a reference to the setting of the Wisconsin River as it flows through the reddish sandstone of the Wisconsin Dells. Other theories include claims that the name originated from one of a variety of Ojibwe words meaning 'red stone place', 'where the waters gather', or 'great rock'. More recently, University of Wisconsin-Green Bay lecturer and Menominee elder Napos Turney suggested the origin of the name may be the Menominee word Wēskōhsaeh, meaning "good place".

== History ==
=== Early history ===
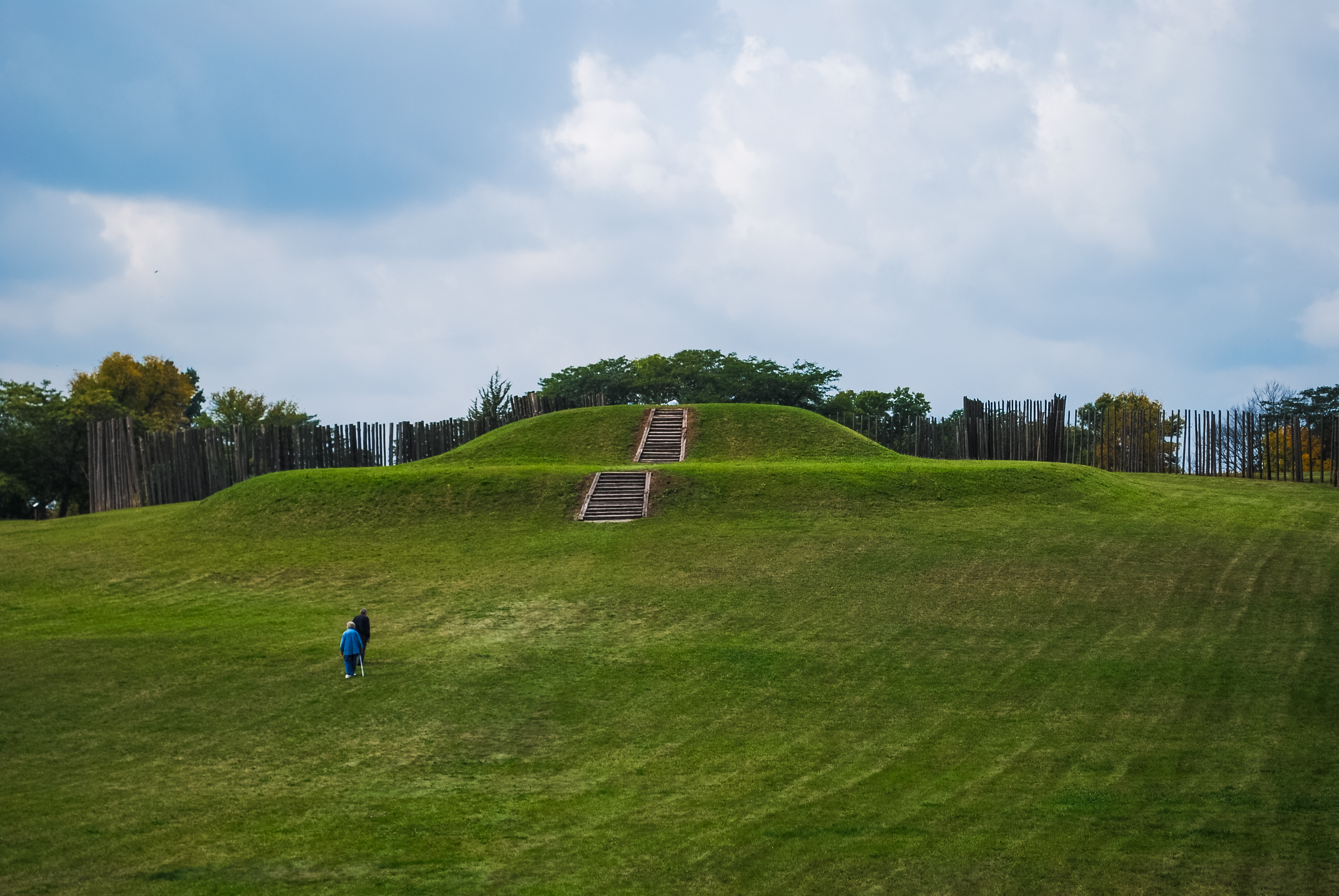
Aztalan State Park marks the site of an ancient Mississippian culture settlement that flourished during the 10th to 13th centuries.

Wisconsin has been home to a wide variety of cultures over the past 14,000 years. The first people arrived around 10,000 BCE during the Wisconsin Glaciation. These early inhabitants, called Paleo-Indians, hunted now-extinct ice age animals such as the Boaz mastodon, a prehistoric mastodon skeleton unearthed along with spear points in southwest Wisconsin. After the ice age ended around 8000 BCE, people in the subsequent Archaic period lived by hunting, fishing, and gathering food from wild plants. Agricultural societies emerged gradually over the Woodland period between 1000 BCE to 1000 CE. Toward the end of this period, Wisconsin was the heartland of the "Effigy Mound culture", which built thousands of animal-shaped mounds across the landscape.

Later, between 1000 and 1500 CE, the Mississippian and Oneota cultures built substantial settlements including the fortified village at Aztalan in southeast Wisconsin. The Oneota may be the ancestors of the modern Iowa and Ho-Chunk nations who shared the Wisconsin region with the Menominee at the time of European contact. Other Native American groups living in Wisconsin when Europeans first settled included the Ojibwe, Sauk, Meskwaki, Kickapoo, and Potawatomi, who migrated to Wisconsin from the east between 1500 and 1700.

=== European settlements ===
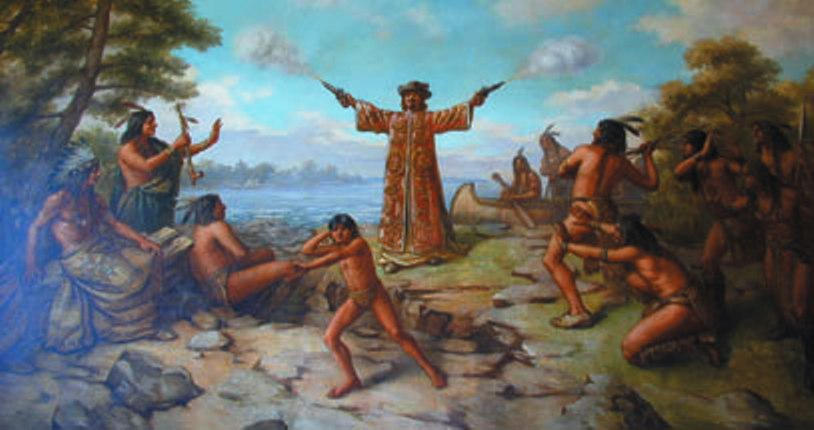
Jean Nicolet, depicted in a 1910 painting by Frank Rohrbeck, was probably the first European to explore Wisconsin. The mural is located in the Brown County Courthouse in Green Bay.

The first European to visit what became Wisconsin was probably the French explorer Jean Nicolet. He canoed west from Georgian Bay through the Great Lakes in 1634, and it is traditionally assumed that he came ashore near Green Bay at Red Banks. Pierre Radisson and Médard des Groseilliers visited Green Bay again in 1654–1666 and Chequamegon Bay in 1659–1660, where they traded for fur with local Native Americans. In 1673, Jacques Marquette and Louis Jolliet became the first to record a journey on the Fox-Wisconsin Waterway all the way to the Mississippi River near Prairie du Chien. Frenchmen like Nicholas Perrot continued to ply the fur trade across Wisconsin through the 17th and 18th centuries, but the French made no permanent settlements in Wisconsin before Great Britain won control of the region following the French and Indian War in 1763. Even so, French traders continued to work in the region after the war, and some, beginning with Charles de Langlade in 1764, settled in Wisconsin permanently, rather than returning to British-controlled Canada.

The British gradually took over Wisconsin during the French and Indian War, taking control of Green Bay in 1761 and gaining control of all of Wisconsin in 1763. Like the French, the British were interested in little but the fur trade. One notable event in the fur trading industry in Wisconsin occurred in 1791, when two free African Americans set up a fur trading post among the Menominee at present-day Marinette. The first permanent settlers, mostly French Canadians, some Anglo-New Englanders and a few African American freedmen, arrived in Wisconsin while it was under British control. Charles de Langlade is generally recognized as the first settler, establishing a trading post at Green Bay in 1745, and moving there permanently in 1764.

Settlement began at Prairie du Chien around 1781. French residents at the Green Bay trading post called it "La Baye" while British fur traders favored "Green Bay" for the green tints the water and shore took on each spring. The British name gradually stuck. The transition to British rule had little adverse effect on French residents, as each side needed the other's cooperation. The French had issued trading licenses sparingly, but the British, eager to maximize profits, extended them freely to both British and French traders. The fur trade reached its peak under British rule, and Wisconsin's first self-sustaining farms were established during this period. From 1763 to 1780, Green Bay was a prosperous community that grew its own food, built graceful cottages, and hosted dances and festivities.

Joseph Roi built the Tank Cottage in Green Bay in 1776. Located in Heritage Hill State Historical Park, it is the oldest standing building from Wisconsin's early years and is listed on the National Register of Historic Places.

=== U.S. territory ===
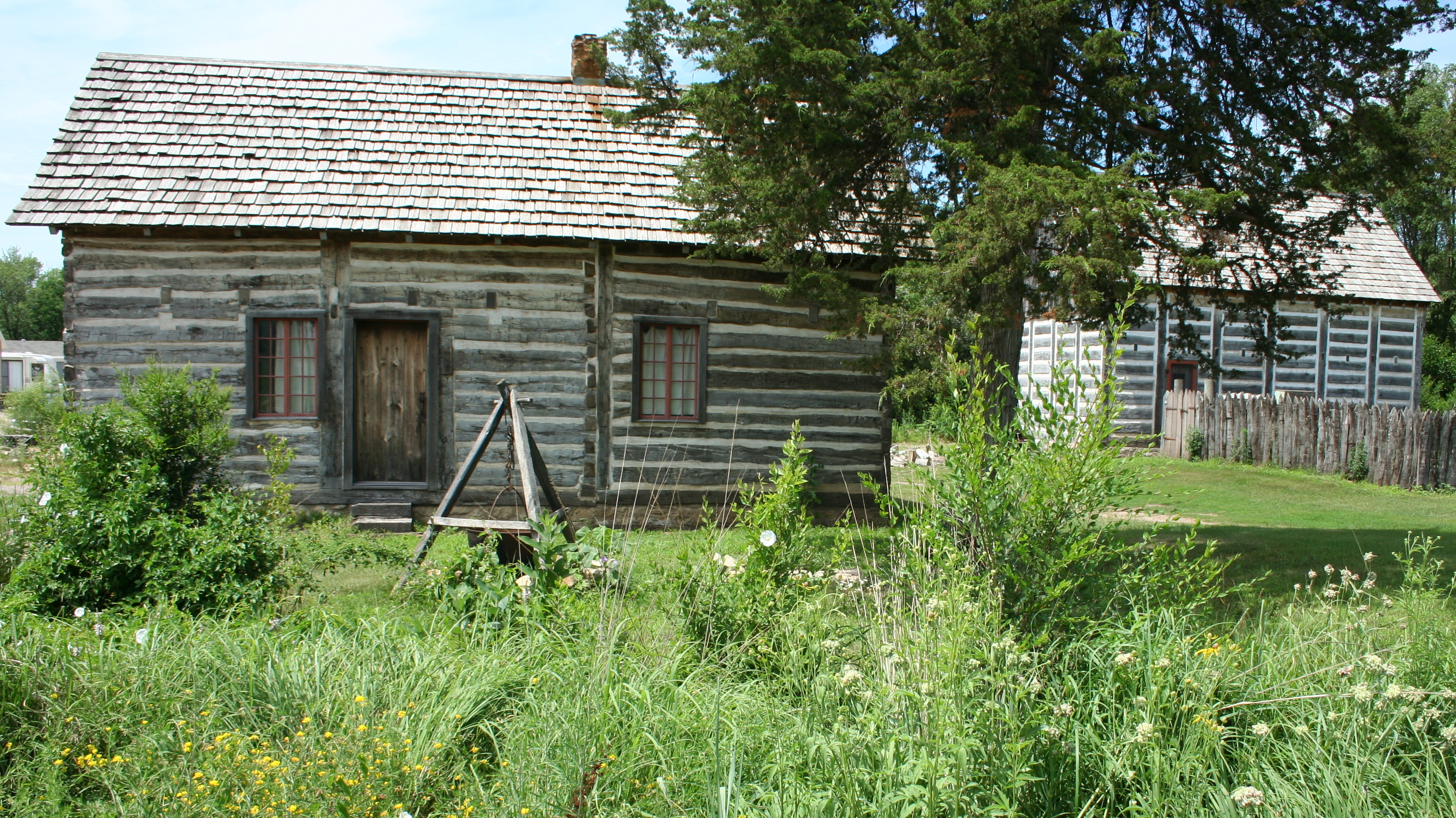
The Francois Vertefeuille House in Prairie du Chien was built in the 1810s by fur traders.

Wisconsin became a territorial possession of the United States in 1783 after the American Revolutionary War. In 1787, it became part of the Northwest Territory. As territorial boundaries subsequently developed, it was then part of Indiana Territory from 1800 to 1809, Illinois Territory from 1809 to 1818, and Michigan Territory from 1818 to 1836. However, the British remained in control until after the War of 1812, the outcome of which finally established an American presence in the area.

Under American control, the economy of the territory shifted from fur trading to lead mining. The prospect of easy mineral wealth drew immigrants from throughout the U.S. and Europe to the lead deposits at Mineral Point, Dodgeville, and nearby areas. Some miners found shelter in the holes they had dug, and earned the nickname "badgers", leading to Wisconsin's identity as the "Badger State". The sudden influx of white miners prompted tension with the local Native American population. The Winnebago War of 1827 and the Black Hawk War of 1832 culminated in the forced removal of Native Americans from most parts of the state.

Following these conflicts, the Wisconsin Territory was created by an act of the United States Congress on April 20, 1836. By fall of that year, the best prairie groves of the counties surrounding what is now Milwaukee were occupied by farmers from the New England states.

=== Statehood ===
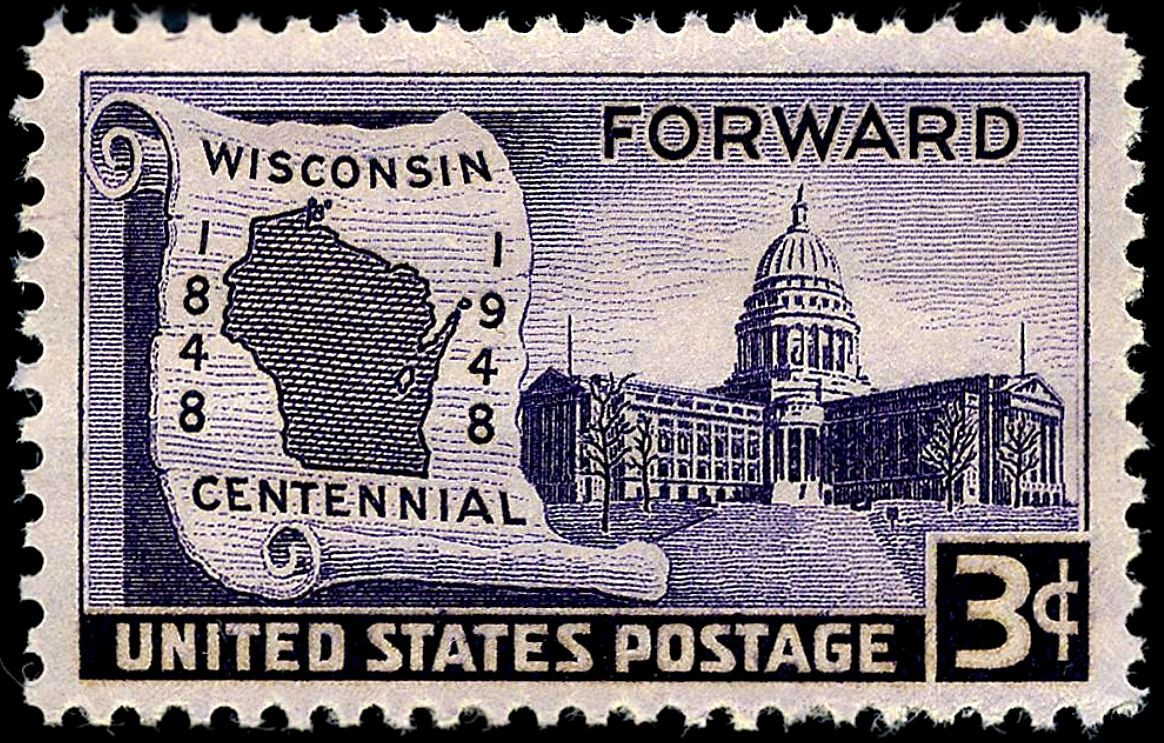
On May 29, 1948, the U.S. Post Office issued a commemorative stamp celebrating the 100th anniversary of Wisconsin statehood, featuring the state capitol building and map of Wisconsin.

The Great Lakes, via the Erie Canal, facilitated the travel of both Yankee settlers and European immigrants to Wisconsin Territory. Yankees from New England and upstate New York seized a dominant position in law and politics, enacting policies that marginalized the region's earlier Native American and French-Canadian residents. Yankees also speculated in real estate, platted towns such as Racine, Beloit, Burlington, and Janesville, and established schools, civic institutions, and Congregationalist churches. At the same time, many Germans, Irish, Norwegians, and other immigrants also settled in towns and farms across the territory, establishing Catholic and Lutheran institutions.

The growing population allowed Wisconsin to gain statehood on May 29, 1848, as the 30th state. Between 1840 and 1850, Wisconsin's non-Indian population had swollen from 31,000 to 305,000. More than a third of residents (110,500) were foreign born, including 38,000 Germans, 28,000 British immigrants from England, Scotland, and Wales, and 21,000 Irish. Another third (103,000) were Yankees from New England and western New York state. Only about 63,000 residents in 1850 had been born in Wisconsin.

Nelson Dewey, the first governor of Wisconsin, was a Democrat. Dewey oversaw the transition from the territorial to the new state government. He encouraged the development of the state's infrastructure, particularly the construction of new roads, railroads, canals, and harbors, as well as the improvement of the Fox and Wisconsin Rivers. During his administration, the State Board of Public Works was organized. Dewey, an abolitionist, was the first of many Wisconsin governors to advocate against the spread of slavery into new states and territories.

=== Civil War era and economic growth ===
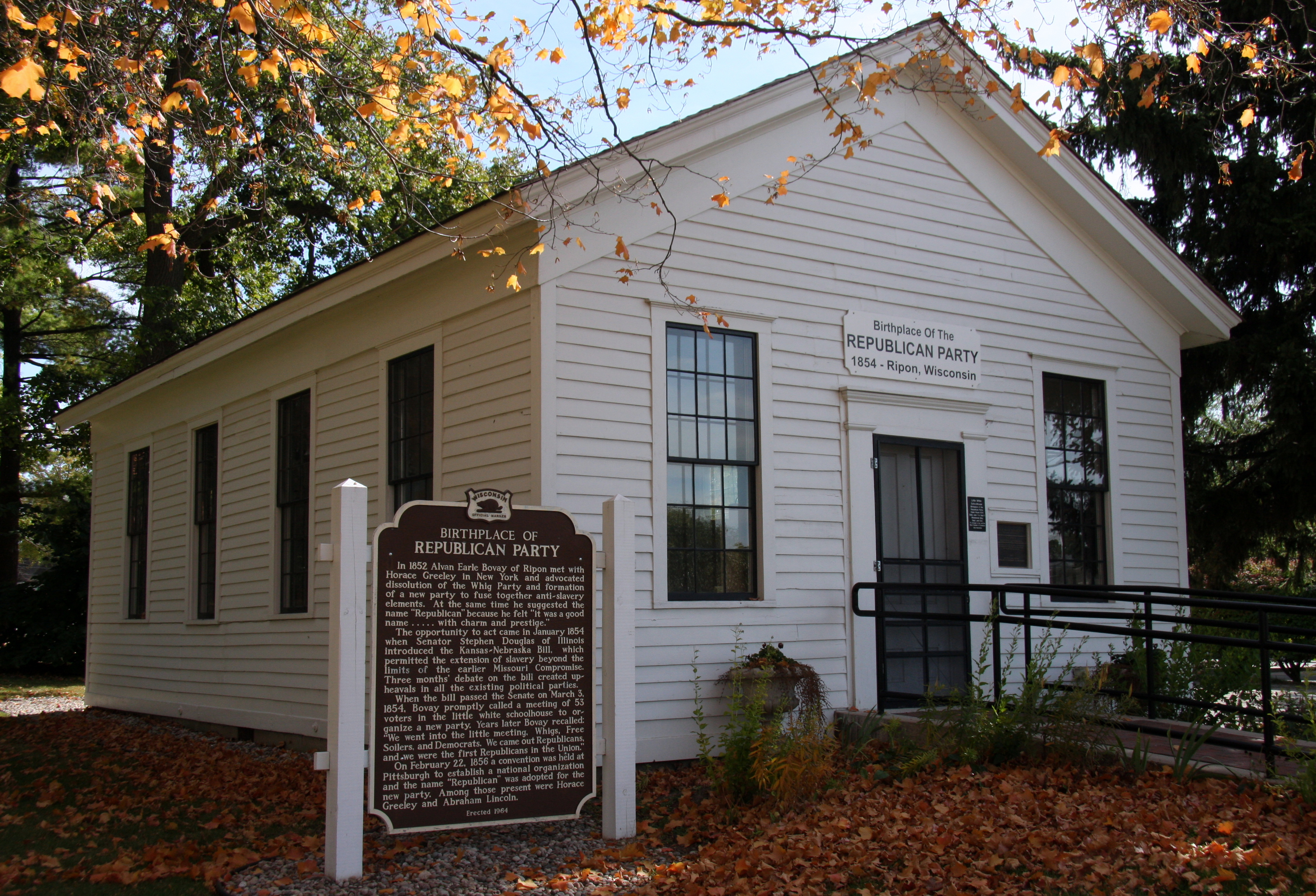
The Little White Schoolhouse in Ripon held the nation's first meeting of the Republican Party.

Politics in early Wisconsin were defined by the greater national debate over slavery. A free state from its foundation, Wisconsin became a center of northern abolitionism. The debate became especially intense in 1854 after Joshua Glover, a runaway slave from Missouri, was captured in Racine. Glover was taken into custody under the Federal Fugitive Slave Law, but a mob of abolitionists stormed the prison where Glover was held and helped him escape to Canada. In a trial stemming from the incident, the Wisconsin Supreme Court ultimately declared the Fugitive Slave Law unconstitutional. The Republican Party, founded on March 20, 1854, by anti-slavery expansion activists in Ripon, Wisconsin, grew to dominate state politics in the aftermath of these events.

During the American Civil War, around 91,000 troops from Wisconsin fought for the Union. A number of Wisconsin regiments were distinguished, including three that served in the celebrated "Iron Brigade"— the 2nd Wisconsin, 6th Wisconsin, and 7th Wisconsin. The 8th Wisconsin, another hard-fighting regiment, was often accompanied into battle by its mascot, Old Abe, a bald eagle.

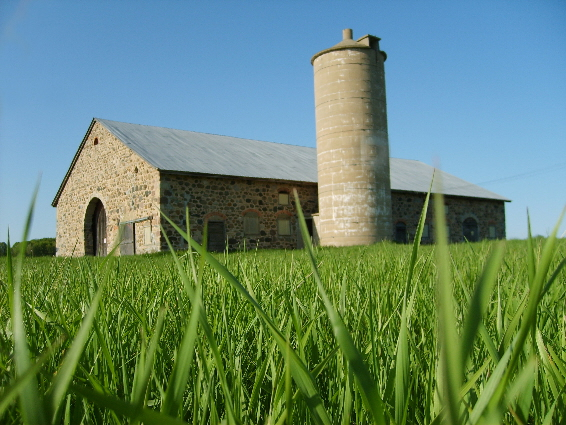
The Daniel E. Krause Stone Barn in Chase was built in 1903, as dairy farming spread across the state.

Wisconsin's economy also diversified during the early years of statehood. While lead mining diminished, agriculture became a principal occupation in the southern half of the state. Railroads were built across the state to help transport grains to market, and industries like J.I. Case & Company in Racine were founded to build agricultural equipment. Wisconsin briefly became one of the nation's leading producers of wheat during the 1860s. Meanwhile, the lumber industry dominated in the heavily forested northern sections of Wisconsin, and sawmills sprang up in cities such as La Crosse, Eau Claire, and Wausau. These economic activities had severe environmental consequences. By the close of the 19th century, intensive agriculture had devastated soil fertility, and lumbering had deforested most of the state. These conditions forced both wheat agriculture and the lumber industry into a precipitous decline.

Beginning in the 1890s, farmers in Wisconsin shifted from wheat to dairy production to make more sustainable and profitable use of their land. Many immigrants carried cheese-making traditions that, combined with the state's suitable geography and dairy research led by Stephen Babcock at the University of Wisconsin, helped the state build a reputation as "America's Dairyland". Meanwhile, conservationists including Aldo Leopold helped re-establish the state's forests during the early 20th century, paving the way for a more renewable lumber and paper milling industry as well as promoting recreational tourism in the northern woodlands. Manufacturing also boomed in Wisconsin during the early 20th century, driven by an immense immigrant workforce arriving from Europe. Industries in cities like Milwaukee ranged from brewing and food processing to heavy machine production and tool-making, leading Wisconsin to rank 8th among U.S. states in total product value by 1910.

=== Progressive era and World Wars ===
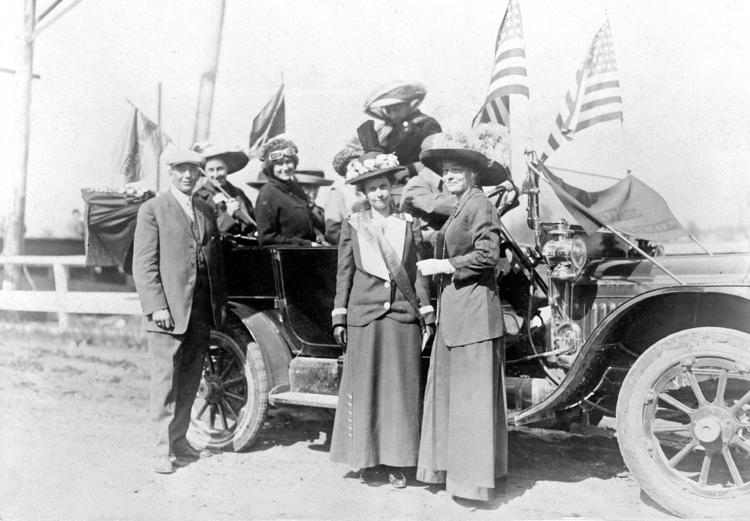
Suffragists campaigning, 1916. Wisconsin was among the earliest states to ratify the Nineteenth Amendment.

The early 20th century was notable for the emergence of progressive politics championed by Robert M. La Follette, who served as governor from 1901 to 1906 and U.S. senator from 1906 to 1925. Between 1901 and 1914, Progressive Republicans in Wisconsin created the nation's first comprehensive statewide primary election system, the first effective workplace injury compensation law, and the first state income tax, making taxation proportional to actual earnings.

During World War I, due to the neutrality of Wisconsin and many of its Republicans, Progressives, and Conservatives, including Germans and Scandinavians who were a significant proportion of the state's population, Wisconsin began to be accused of being the "Traitor State" by many "hyper patriots."

As the war raged on in Europe, La Follette led the antiwar movement in Wisconsin and steered a group of progressive senators in blocking a bill by President Woodrow Wilson that would have armed merchant ships with guns. Many Wisconsin politicians, such as Emanuel L. Philipp and Irvine Lenroot, were accused of having divided loyalties. Even with outspoken opponents to the war, at the onset of the war, many Wisconsinites would abandon neutrality. Businesses, labor and farms all enjoyed prosperity from the war. With over 118,000 going into military service, Wisconsin was the first state to report for the national drafts conducted by the U.S. military. As governor, Philipp was successful in combating anti-German hysteria in the state.

The progressive Wisconsin Idea also promoted the statewide expansion of the University of Wisconsin through the UW–Extension system at this time. In 1932, UW economics professors John R. Commons and Harold Groves helped Wisconsin create the United States' first unemployment compensation program. Other Wisconsin Idea scholars at the university generated the plan that became the New Deal's Social Security Act of 1935, with Wisconsin expert Arthur J. Altmeyer playing a key role.

Governor Philip La Follette announces formation of the National Progressives of America, 1938

After La Follette died, his sons Philip and Robert Jr. took over the Wisconsin Republican Party, later founding the Wisconsin Progressive Party as a successor to their father's Progressive Party. It gained momentum in the mid-1930s with support from President Franklin D. Roosevelt and progressive Democrats, winning offices statewide and in Congress. The party declined after Philip, facing scandal and accusations of authoritarianism, lost reelection in 1938 to Julius P. Heil and left politics to serve in World War II. The National Progressives of America, an organization Philip had hoped would precede a national realignment, then faltered.

The last Progressive candidate elected governor of Wisconsin was Orland S. Loomis, in 1942. He died before taking office. The Wisconsin Supreme Court ruled that Republican Lieutenant Governor Walter S. Goodland would serve Loomis's term as governor. In 1946, the Wisconsin Progressives voted to dissolve and rejoin the Republican Party.

=== Mid-20th century to present ===
In World War II's immediate aftermath, Wisconsinites were divided over issues such as the creation of the United Nations, support for the European recovery, and the growth of the Soviet Union's power. But when Europe divided into Communist and capitalist camps, and with the Progressive Party's collapse, Robert La Follette Jr. rejoined the Republican Party of Wisconsin to run in the 1946 Senate election. He narrowly lost to Joseph McCarthy in the Republican primary. After the Chinese Communist Revolution of 1949, public opinion began to continue move toward support for the protection of democracy and capitalism against Communist expansion.

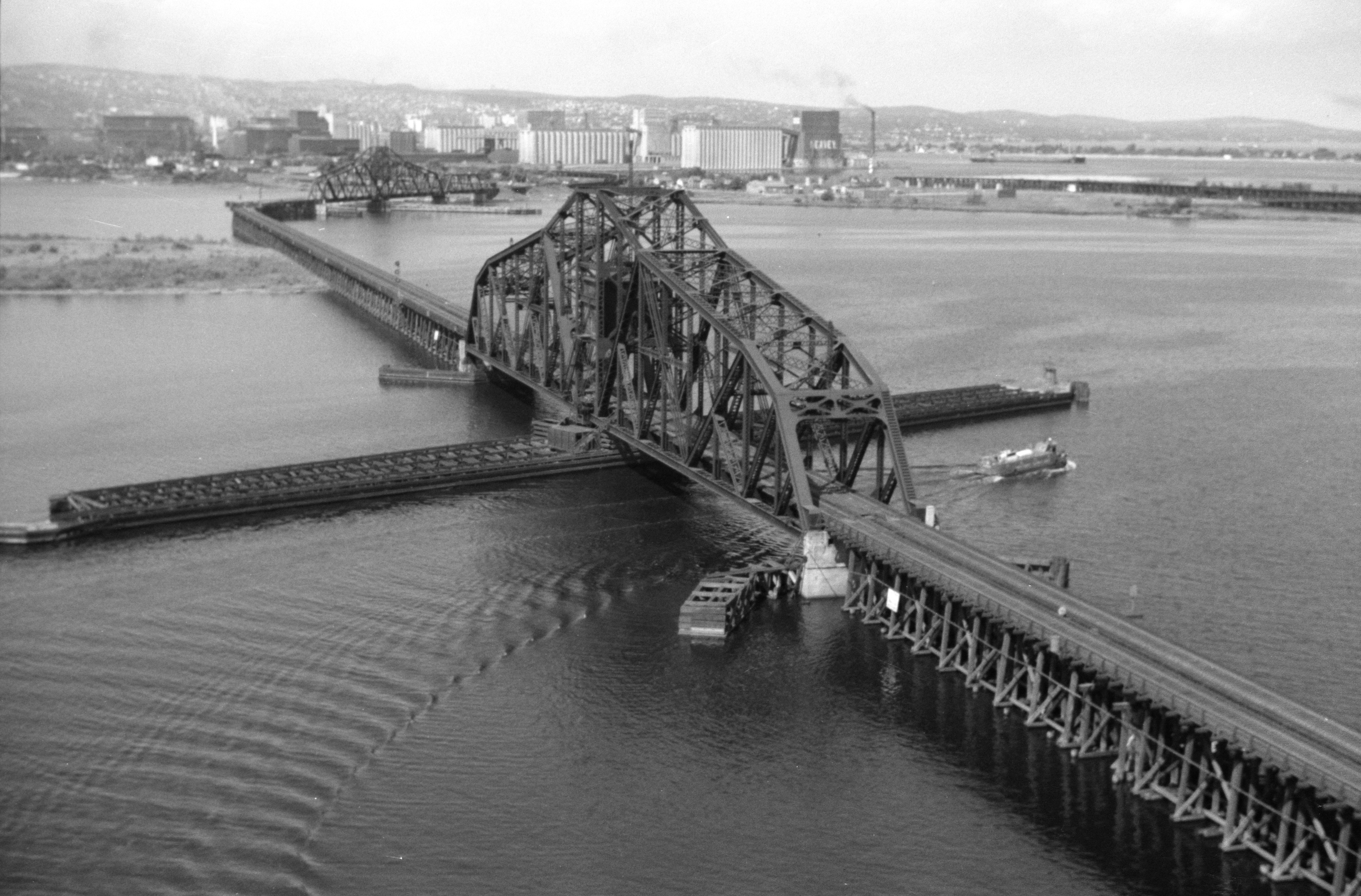
In the 20th century, Superior was a major hub for shipping iron ore across the Great Lakes via lake freighters.

Wisconsin took part in several political extremes in the mid- to late 20th century, ranging from the anti-communist crusades of Senator McCarthy in the 1950s, to the founding of Earth Day by environmental advocate Gaylord Nelson in 1970. During radical protests against the Vietnam War at UW-Madison, an attack by anarchists culminated in the Sterling Hall bombing in August 1970. The state undertook welfare reform under Republican Governor Tommy Thompson during the 1990s. Its economy also underwent further transformations toward the end of the 20th century, as heavy industry and manufacturing declined in favor of a service economy based on medicine, education, agribusiness, and tourism.

In 2011, Wisconsin became the focus of some controversy when newly elected governor Scott Walker proposed and then passed and enacted 2011 Wisconsin Act 10, which made large changes in the areas of collective bargaining, compensation, retirement, health insurance, and sick leave of public sector employees, among other changes. A series of major protests by union supporters took place that year in protest to the changes, and Walker survived a recall election held the next year in 2012, becoming the first governor in U.S. history to do so. Also in 2012, Congressman Paul Ryan became the first Wisconsinite to appear on a major party ticket, as Republican nominee Mitt Romney's running mate in the 2012 United States presidential election. Ryan was elected Speaker of the House in 2015.

Since 2023, five University of Wisconsin branch campuses have closed, one has gone entirely online, and one has stopped using several of its buildings. Many have expressed concern about the Wisconsin Idea's future since these closures.

== Geography ==
Wisconsin geographic regions

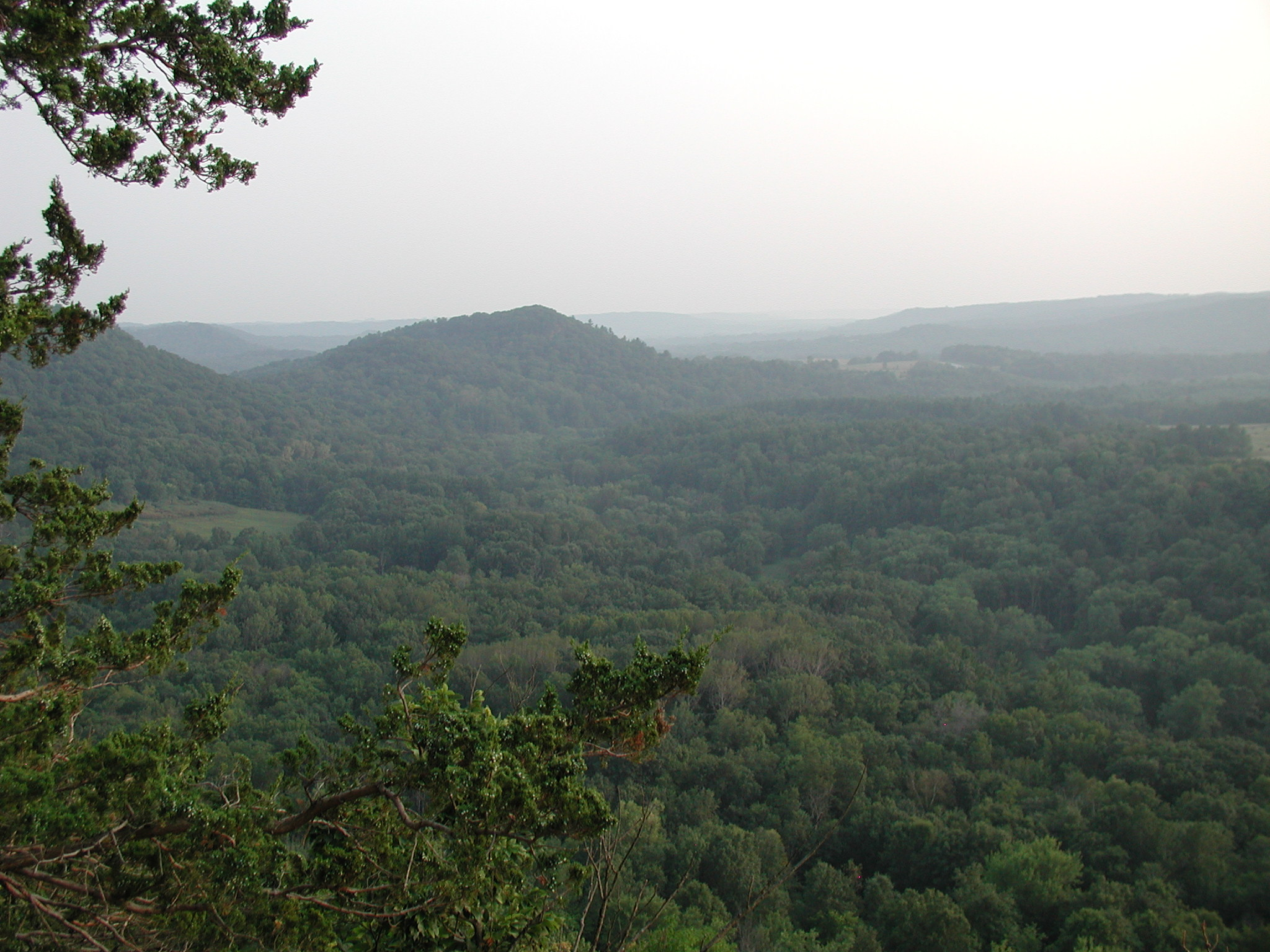
The Driftless Area is characterized by bluffs carved in sedimentary rock by water from melting Ice age glaciers.

Sea caves are located on the shorelines of the Apostle Islands in Lake Superior.

Wisconsin is in the Midwestern United States and is part of both the Great Lakes region and the Upper Midwest. The state has a total area of 65,496 square miles (169,630 km^{2}). Wisconsin is bordered by Lake Superior and Michigan to the north; by Lake Michigan to the east; by Illinois to the south; and by Iowa to the southwest and Minnesota to the northwest. A border dispute with Michigan was settled by two cases, both Wisconsin v. Michigan, in 1934 and 1935. The state's boundaries include the Mississippi River and St. Croix River in the west, and the Menominee River and Montreal River in the northeast.

Lying between the Great Lakes and the Mississippi River, Wisconsin has a wide variety of geographical features. The state is divided into five distinct regions. In the north, the Lake Superior Lowland occupies a belt of land along Lake Superior. Just to the south, the Northern Highland has massive mixed hardwood and coniferous forests including the 1,500,000-acre (610,000-hectare) Chequamegon–Nicolet National Forest, as well as thousands of glacial lakes, and the state's highest point, Timms Hill. In the middle of the state, the Central Plain has some unique sandstone formations like the Dells of the Wisconsin River in addition to rich farmland. The Eastern Ridges and Lowlands region in the southeast is home to many of Wisconsin's largest cities. The ridges include the Niagara Escarpment that stretches from New York, the Black River Escarpment and the Magnesian Escarpment. In the southwest, the Western Upland is a rugged landscape with a mix of forest and farmland, including many bluffs on the Mississippi River, and the Baraboo Range. This region is part of the Driftless Area, which also includes parts of Iowa, Illinois, and Minnesota. Overall, 46% of Wisconsin's land area is covered by forest.

Wisconsin has geologic formations and deposits that vary in age from over three billion years to several thousand years, with most rocks being millions of years old. The oldest geologic formations were created over 600 million years ago during the Precambrian, the majority below the glacial deposits. Much of the Baraboo Range consists of Baraboo Quartzite and other Precambrian metamorphic rock. This area was not covered by glaciers during the most recent ice age, the Wisconsin Glaciation. Langlade County has a soil rarely found outside the county called Antigo silt loam.

The state has more than 12,000 named rivers and streams, totaling 84,000 miles (135,000 km) in length. It has over 15,000 named lakes, totaling about 1 million acres (4,000 km^{2}). Lake Winnebago is the largest inland lake, with over 137,700 acres (557 km^{2}), and 88 miles (142 km) of shoreline. Along the two Great Lakes, Wisconsin has over 800 miles (1,300 km) of shoreline (over 500 miles (800 km), not counting minor islands and indentations). Many of the named islands in Wisconsin are in the Great Lakes; many surround the Door Peninsula in Lake Michigan or are part of the Apostle Islands in Lake Superior. The Mississippi River and inland lakes and rivers contain the rest of Wisconsin's islands.

Areas under the protection of the National Park Service include the Apostle Islands National Lakeshore, Ice Age National Scenic Trail, and portions of the Saint Croix National Scenic Riverway and North Country National Scenic Trail. There are an additional 18 National Natural Landmarks in the state that include dune and swales, swamps, bogs, and old-growth forests. Wisconsin has 50 state park units, covering more than 60,570 acres (245.1 km^{2}) in state parks and state recreation areas maintained by the Wisconsin Department of Natural Resources. The Division of Forestry manages a further 471,329 acres (1,907.40 km^{2}) in Wisconsin's state forests.

=== Climate ===
Köppen climate types of Wisconsin

Most of Wisconsin is classified as warm-summer humid continental climate (Köppen Dfb), while southern and southwestern portions are classified as hot-summer humid continental climate (Köppen Dfa). The highest temperature ever recorded in the state was in the Wisconsin Dells, on July 13, 1936, where it reached 114 °F (46 °C). The lowest temperature ever recorded in Wisconsin was in the village of Couderay, where it reached −55 °F (−48 °C) on both February 2 and 4, 1996. Wisconsin also receives a large amount of regular snowfall averaging around 40 inches (100 cm) in the southern portions with up to 160 inches (410 cm) annually in the Lake Superior snowbelt each year.

Monthly normal high and low temperatures for selected Wisconsin cities [°F (°C)]
City	Jan	Feb	Mar	Apr	May	Jun	Jul	Aug	Sep	Oct	Nov	Dec
Green Bay	25/10 (−4/−12)	29/13 (−2/−11)	40/23 (5/−5)	55/35 (13/1)	67/45 (19/7)	76/55 (25/13)	81/59 (27/15)	79/58 (26/14)	71/49 (22/10)	58/38 (14/4)	43/28 (6/−2)	30/15 (−1/−9)
Hurley	19/0 (−7/−18)	26/4 (−4/−16)	36/16 (2/−9)	49/29 (9/−2)	65/41 (18/5)	73/50 (23/10)	76/56 (25/13)	75/54 (24/12)	65/46 (18/8)	53/35 (12/2)	36/22 (2/−6)	24/8 (−5/−14)
La Crosse	26/6 (−3/−14)	32/13 (0/−11)	45/24 (7/−4)	60/37 (16/3)	72/49 (22/9)	81/58 (27/14)	85/63 (29/17)	82/61 (28/16)	74/52 (23/11)	61/40 (16/4)	44/27 (7/−3)	30/14 (−1/−10)
Madison	27/11 (−3/−12)	32/15 (0/−9)	44/25 (7/−4)	58/36 (14/2)	69/46 (21/8)	79/56 (26/13)	82/61 (28/16)	80/59 (27/15)	73/50 (23/10)	60/39 (15/3)	45/28 (7/−2)	31/16 (−1/−9)
Milwaukee	29/16 (−2/−9)	33/19 (0/−7)	42/28 (6/−2)	54/37 (12/3)	65/47 (18/8)	75/57 (24/14)	80/64 (27/18)	79/63 (26/17)	71/55 (22/13)	59/43 (15/6)	46/32 (8/0)	33/20 (0/−7)
Superior	21/2 (−6/−17)	26/6 (−3/−14)	35/17 (2/−8)	46/29 (8/−2)	56/38 (13/3)	66/47 (19/8)	75/56 (24/13)	74/57 (23/14)	65/47 (18/8)	52/36 (11/2)	38/23 (3/−5)	25/9 (−4/−13)

Climate data for Wisconsin (1981–2010 normals)
Month	Jan	Feb	Mar	Apr	May	Jun	Jul	Aug	Sep	Oct	Nov	Dec	Year
Record high °F (°C)	66 (19)	69 (21)	89 (32)	97 (36)	109 (43)	106 (41)	114 (46)	108 (42)	104 (40)	95 (35)	84 (29)	70 (21)	114 (46)
Mean daily maximum °F (°C)	23.9 (−4.5)	29.2 (−1.6)	40.6 (4.8)	55.5 (13.1)	67.3 (19.6)	76.3 (24.6)	80.4 (26.9)	78.2 (25.7)	69.8 (21.0)	56.9 (13.8)	41.2 (5.1)	27.5 (−2.5)	52.9 (11.6)
Daily mean °F (°C)	15.0 (−9.4)	19.6 (−6.9)	30.5 (−0.8)	44.0 (6.7)	55.3 (12.9)	64.7 (18.2)	69.1 (20.6)	67.1 (19.5)	58.7 (14.8)	46.5 (8.1)	33.1 (0.6)	19.4 (−7.0)	43.6 (6.4)
Mean daily minimum °F (°C)	3.7 (−15.7)	6.3 (−14.3)	18.3 (−7.6)	31.6 (−0.2)	42.6 (5.9)	52.4 (11.3)	57.2 (14.0)	55.0 (12.8)	47.1 (8.4)	36.2 (2.3)	23.7 (−4.6)	10.6 (−11.9)	31.8 (−0.1)
Record low °F (°C)	−54 (−48)	−55 (−48)	−48 (−44)	−20 (−29)	7 (−14)	20 (−7)	27 (−3)	22 (−6)	10 (−12)	−7 (−22)	−34 (−37)	−52 (−47)	−55 (−48)
Average precipitation inches (mm)	1.15 (29)	1.03 (26)	1.80 (46)	2.63 (67)	3.54 (90)	4.17 (106)	3.79 (96)	3.78 (96)	3.75 (95)	2.38 (60)	2.00 (51)	1.27 (32)	31.29 (794)
Average snowfall inches (cm)	11.4 (29)	9.5 (24)	8.7 (22)	3.2 (8.1)	0.4 (1.0)	0.0 (0.0)	0.0 (0.0)	0.0 (0.0)	0.0 (0.0)	0.8 (2.0)	4.9 (12)	10.2 (26)	48.7 (124)
Source: "Wisconsin State Climatology Office".

=== Cities ===
Map of the administrative divisions of Wisconsin

Wisconsin has three types of municipality: cities, villages, and towns. Cities and villages are incorporated urban areas. Towns are unincorporated minor civil divisions of counties with limited self-government.

Over two-thirds of Wisconsin residents live in urban areas. Milwaukee, in southeastern Wisconsin, is the state's most populous city, with approximately 580,000 people. The Milwaukee metropolitan area accounts for 1.57 million of the state's residents. With a population of nearly 280,000, the state capital of Madison is consistently ranked as one of the most livable cities in both the state and country and is the fastest-growing city in Wisconsin. The Madison metropolitan area in southern Wisconsin has about 680,000 residents.

Medium-size cities dot the state. The largest of these is Green Bay in northeastern Wisconsin, with approximately 320,000 people in the metro area. Other metropolitan cities in the state include Appleton, Racine, Oshkosh, Eau Claire, Janesville, Wausau, La Crosse, Sheboygan, and Fond du Lac. Furthermore, another 12 cities function as centers of micropolitan statistical areas which typically anchor a network of working farms surrounding them. As of 2011, there were 12 cities in Wisconsin with a population of 50,000 or more, accounting for 73% of the state's employment.

Largest cities or towns in Wisconsin
Rank	Name	County	Pop.	Rank	Name	County	Pop.
1	Milwaukee	Milwaukee	577,222	11	West Allis	Milwaukee	60,325
2	Madison	Dane	269,840	12	La Crosse	La Crosse	52,680
3	Green Bay	Brown	107,395	13	Sheboygan	Sheboygan	49,929
4	Kenosha	Kenosha	99,986	14	Wauwatosa	Milwaukee	46,396
5	Racine	Racine	77,816	15	Fond du Lac	Fond du Lac	44,678
6	Appleton	Outagamie	75,644	16	Brookfield	Waukesha	41,464
7	Waukesha	Waukesha	71,158	17	New Berlin	Waukesha	40,451
8	Eau Claire	Eau Claire	69,421	18	Wausau	Marathon	39,994
9	Oshkosh	Winnebago	66,816	19	Menomonee Falls	Waukesha	38,527
10	Janesville	Rock	65,615	20	Greenfield	Milwaukee	37,803

== Demographics ==
=== Population ===
Historical population
Census	Pop.	Note	%±
1820	1,444		—
1830	3,635		151.7%
1840	30,945		751.3%
1850	305,391		886.9%
1860	775,881		154.1%
1870	1,054,670		35.9%
1880	1,315,457		24.7%
1890	1,693,330		28.7%
1900	2,069,042		22.2%
1910	2,333,860		12.8%
1920	2,632,067		12.8%
1930	2,939,006		11.7%
1940	3,137,587		6.8%
1950	3,434,575		9.5%
1960	3,951,777		15.1%
1970	4,417,731		11.8%
1980	4,705,767		6.5%
1990	4,891,769		4.0%
2000	5,363,675		9.6%
2010	5,686,986		6.0%
2020	5,893,718		3.6%
2025 (est.)	5,972,787		1.3%
Source: 1910–2020

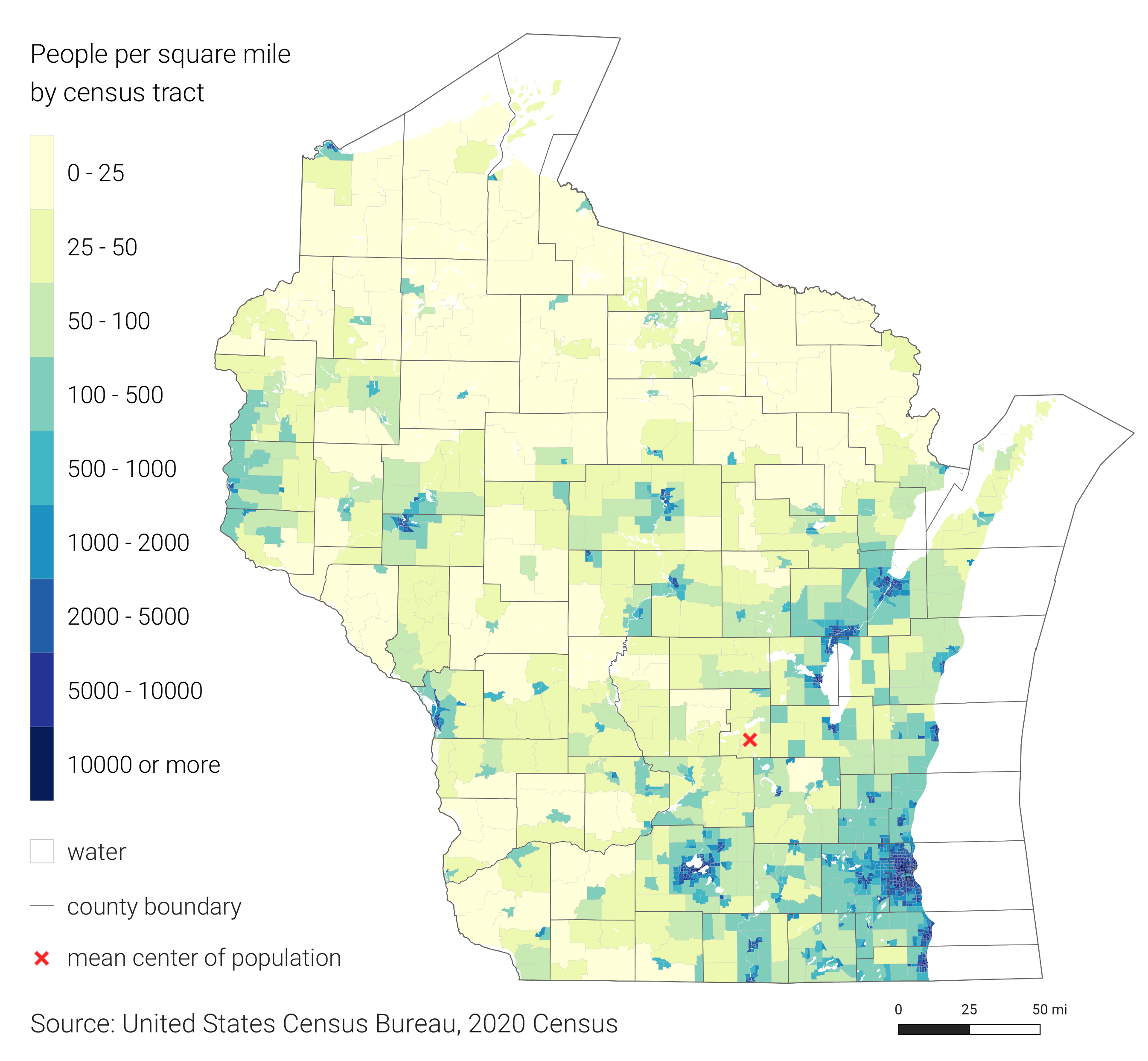
Wisconsin 2020 Population Density Map Largest alone or in any combination ethnic origin by county in Wisconsin, per the 2020 census

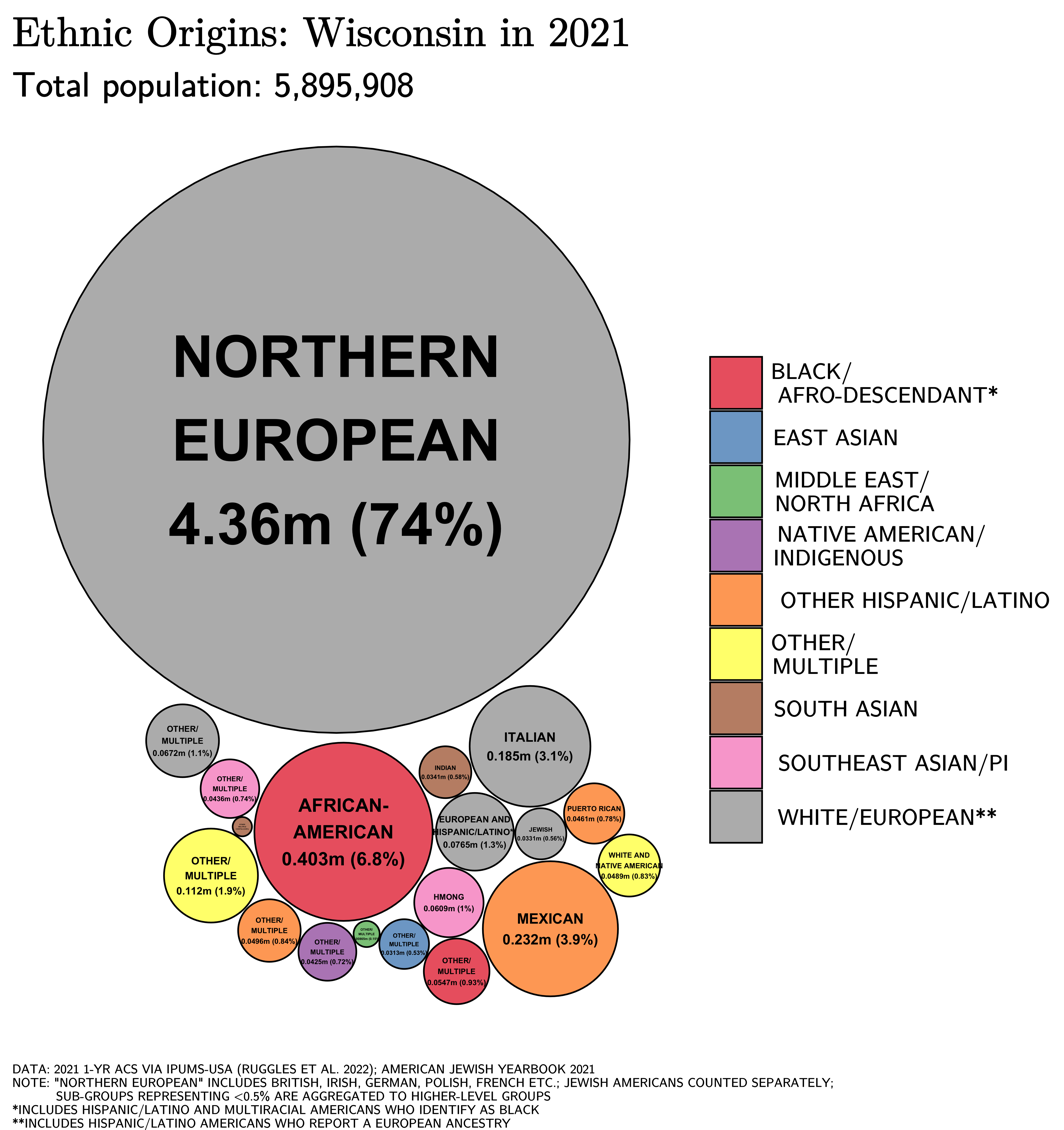
Ethnic origins in Wisconsin

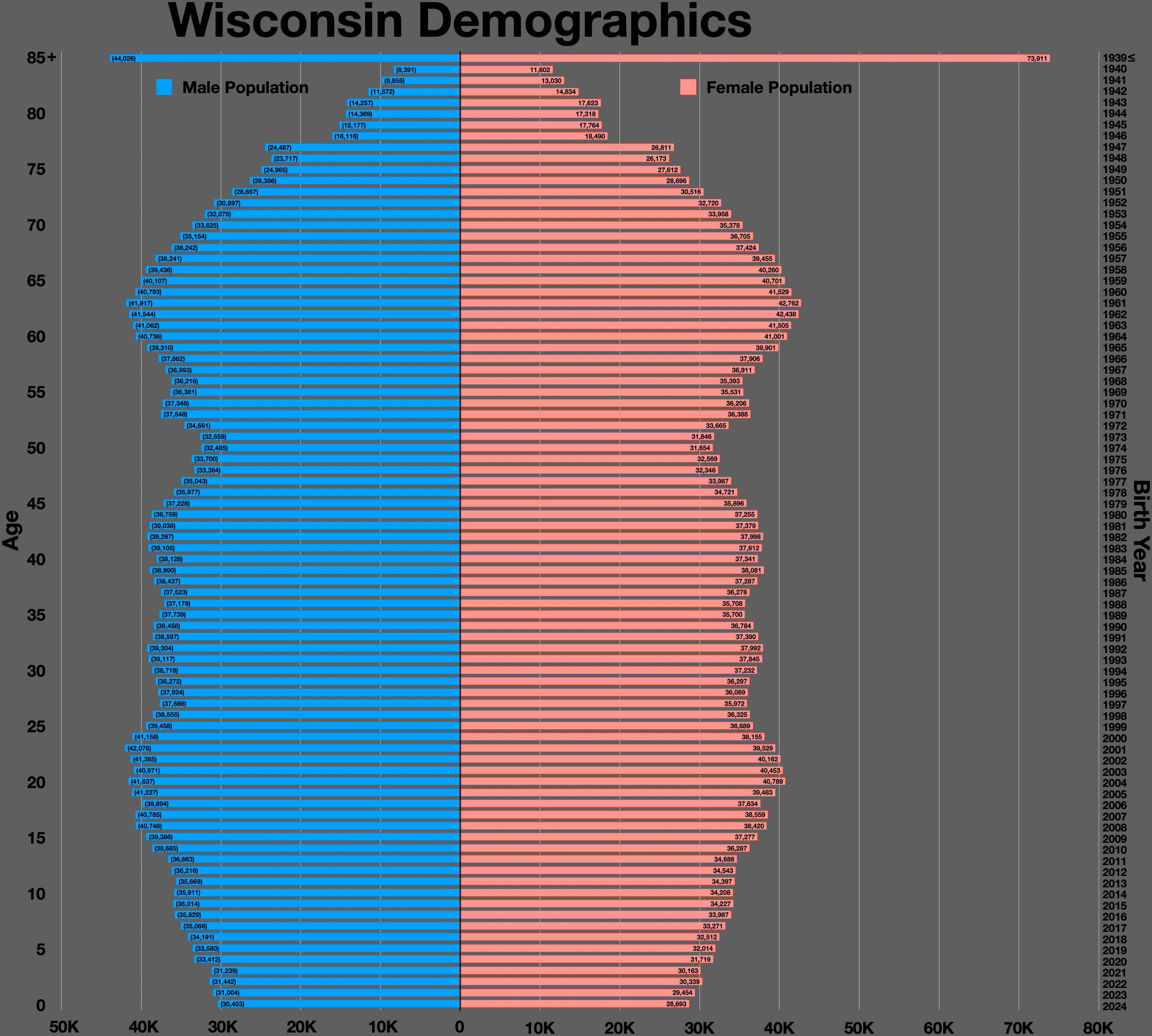
Wisconsin demographics for 2024

The United States Census Bureau estimated Wisconsin's population at 5,822,434 on July 1, 2019, a 2.4% increase since the 2010 United States census. This included a natural increase since the last census of 150,659 people (i.e., 614,771 births minus 464,112 deaths) and a decrease due to net migration of 12,755 people. Immigration resulted in a net increase of 59,251 people, and migration from within the U.S. resulted in a net decrease of 72,006 people.

According to HUD's 2022 Annual Homeless Assessment Report, there were an estimated 4,775 homeless people in Wisconsin.

Ethnic composition as of the 2020 census
Race and Ethnicity	Alone	Total
White (non-Hispanic)	78.6%	81.9%
Hispanic or Latino (Note: Persons of Hispanic or Latino origin are not distinguished between total and partial ancestry.)	—	7.6%
African American (non-Hispanic)	6.2%	7.3%
Asian	3.0%	3.6%
Native American	0.8%	2.0%
Pacific Islander	0.03%	0.1%
Other	0.3%	1.1%

Wisconsin historical population by race
Racial composition	1990	2000	2010	2020
White	92.2%	88.9%	86.2%	80.4%
Black	5.0%	5.7%	6.3%	6.4%
Asian	1.1%	1.7%	2.3%	3.0%
Native	0.8%	0.9%	1.0%	1.0%
Native Hawaiian and other Pacific Islander	–	–	–	–
Other race	0.9%	1.6%	2.4%	3.1%
Two or more races	–	1.3%	1.8%	6.1%
Hispanic or Latino (of any race)	1.9%	3.6%	5.9%	7.6%
Non-Hispanic white	91.3%	87.3%	83.3%	78.6%

Wisconsin – Racial and ethnic composition Note: the US Census treats Hispanic/Latino as an ethnic category. This table excludes Latinos from the racial categories and assigns them to a separate category. Hispanics/Latinos may be of any race.
Race / Ethnicity (NH = Non-Hispanic)	Pop 2000	Pop 2010	Pop 2020	% 2000	% 2010	% 2020
White alone (NH)	4,681,630	4,738,411	4,634,018	87.28%	83.32%	78.63%
Black or African American alone (NH)	300,245	350,898	366,508	5.60%	6.17%	6.22%
Native American or Alaska Native alone (NH)	43,980	48,511	48,384	0.82%	0.85%	0.82%
Asian alone (NH)	87,995	128,052	174,267	1.64%	2.25%	2.96%
Pacific Islander alone (NH)	1,346	1,565	1,892	0.03%	0.03%	0.03%
Other race alone (NH)	3,637	4,095	17,613	0.07%	0.07%	0.30%
Mixed race or Multiracial (NH)	51,921	79,398	203,746	0.97%	1.40%	3.46%
Hispanic or Latino (any race)	192,921	336,056	447,290	3.60%	5.91%	7.59%
Total	5,363,675	5,686,986	5,893,718	100.00%	100.00%	100.00%

In 2022, the five largest European ancestry groups were: German (36%), Irish (10.2%), Polish (7.9%), English (6.7%), and Norwegian (6.3%). German is the most common ancestry in every county in the state, except Menominee, Trempealeau, and Vernon. Wisconsin has the highest percentage of residents of Polish ancestry of any state. According to the 2022 American Community Survey, 7.6% of Wisconsin's population were of Hispanic or Latino origin (of any race). The largest Hispanic ancestry groups were Mexican (5.1%), Puerto Rican (1.1%), Central American (0.4%), and Cuban (0.1%), with 0.9% reporting other Hispanic or Latino origins.

Since its founding, Wisconsin has been ethnically heterogeneous. Following the period of French fur traders, the next wave of settlers were miners, many of whom were Cornish, who settled the southwestern area of the state. The next wave was dominated by "Yankees", migrants of English descent from New England and upstate New York; in the early years of statehood, they dominated the state's heavy industry, finance, politics, and education. Between 1850 and 1900, the immigrants were mostly Germans, Scandinavians (the largest group being Norwegian), Irish, and Poles. In the 20th century, a number of African Americans and Mexicans settled in Milwaukee; and after the end of the Vietnam War came an influx of Hmongs.

The various ethnic groups settled in different areas of the state. Although German immigrants settled throughout the state, the largest concentration was in Milwaukee. Norwegian immigrants settled in lumbering and farming areas in the north and west. Irish, Italian, and Polish immigrants settled primarily in urban areas. Menominee County is the only county in the eastern United States with a Native American majority.

African Americans came to Milwaukee, especially from 1940 on. 86% of Wisconsin's African-American population live in four cities: Milwaukee, Racine, Beloit, Kenosha, with Milwaukee home to nearly three-fourths of the state's black Americans. In the Great Lakes region, only Detroit and Cleveland have a higher percentage of African-American residents.

About 33% of Wisconsin's Asian population is Hmong, with significant communities in Milwaukee, Wausau, Green Bay, Sheboygan, Appleton, Madison, La Crosse, Eau Claire, Oshkosh, and Manitowoc. 61,629 people in Wisconsin, or around 1% of the population, identify as Hmong.

Of the residents of Wisconsin, 71.7% were born in Wisconsin, 23.0% were born in a different US state, 0.7% were born in Puerto Rico, U.S. Island areas, or born abroad to American parent(s), and 4.6% were foreign born.

In 2018, the countries of origin for Wisconsin's immigrants came from Mexico, India, China, Laos and the Philippines.

Vital statistics

Map of counties in Wisconsin by racial plurality, per the 2020 U.S. census Legend: | Non-Hispanic White 40–50% 60–70% 70–80% 80–90% 90%+ | Native American 80–90% |

Note: Births in table add to over 100%, because Hispanics are counted both by their ethnicity and by their race, giving a higher overall number.

Live births by single race or ethnicity of mother
Race	2014	2015	2016	2017	2018	2019	2020	2021	2022	2023	2024
White	49,440 (73.6%)	49,024 (73.1%)	47,994 (72.0%)	46,309 (71.3%)	45,654 (71.2%)	44,784 (70.8%)	42,715 (70.5%)	43,991 (71.2%)	42,455 (70.7%)	41,471 (69.4%)	40,779 (68.3%)
Black	7,328 (10.9%)	7,386 (11.0%)	6,569 (9.9%)	6,864 (10.6%)	6,622 (10.3%)	6,859 (10.8%)	6,429 (10.6%)	5,964 (9.6%)	5,688 (9.5%)	5,592 (9.3%)	5,467 (9.1%)
Asian	3,333 (5.0%)	3,276 (4.9%)	3,220 (4.8%)	3,017 (4.6%)	3,155 (4.9%)	2,942 (4.6%)	2,870 (4.7%)	2,692 (4.3%)	2,661 (4.4%)	2,651 (4.4%)	2,789 (4.6%)
American Indian	980 (1.5%)	1,029 (1.5%)	689 (1.0%)	745 (1.1%)	707 (1.1%)	664 (1.0%)	573 (0.9%)	546 (0.9%)	499 (0.8%)	486 (0.8%)	450 (0.7%)
Hispanic (any race)	6,375 (9.5%)	6,604 (9.9%)	6,504 (9.8%)	6,368 (9.8%)	6,365 (9.9%)	6,463 (10.2%)	6,438 (10.6%)	6,923 (11.2%)	6,971 (11.6%)	7,591 (12.7%)	8,243 (13.8%)
Total	67,161 (100%)	67,041 (100%)	66,615 (100%)	64,975 (100%)	64,098 (100%)	63,270 (100%)	60,594 (100%)	61,781 (100%)	60,049 (100%)	59,754 (100%)	59,686 (100%)

- Since 2016, data for births of White Hispanic origin are not collected, but included in one Hispanic group; persons of Hispanic origin may be of any race.

=== Religion ===
Religious self-identification, per Public Religion Research Institute's 2022 American Values Survey
1. Protestantism (41.0%)
2. Catholicism (27.0%)
3. Jehovah's Witness (1.00%)
4. Judaism (1.00%)
5. Buddhism (1.00%)
6. Hinduism (1.00%)
7. Unitarian Universalism (1.00%)
8. New Age (1.00%)
9. Unaffiliated (25.0%)
10. Other (1.00%)

According to Public Religion Research Institute's 2022 American Values Survey, those identifying with a religion or spiritual tradition were approximately 75% of the state's population. 69% of Wisconsinites self-identified as Christian. Specifically, 25% of respondents identified as Mainline Protestant, 12% as Evangelical Protestant, 4% as other Protestants, and 27% as Catholic. Roughly 25% of the population were unaffiliated with any religious body. Small minorities of Jews (1%), Hindus (1%), Buddhists (1%), Jehovah's Witnesses (1%), Unitarian Universalists (1%), Muslims (<1%), Mormons (<1%), and other faiths exist according to this study.

Christianity is the predominant religion in Wisconsin. Per the Association of Religion Data Archives' 2020 study, Catholicism was the single-largest denomination with 1,237,342 adherents, followed by the Evangelical Lutheran Church in America with 316,245 members and the Wisconsin Evangelical Lutheran Synod with 209,788 adherents. 276,904 adhered to nondenominational Christianity.

=== Crime ===
Statewide FBI Crime statistics for 2009 include 144 murders/non-negligent manslaughter; 1,108 rapes; 4,850 robberies; 8,431 aggravated assaults; and 147,486 property crimes. Wisconsin also publishes its own statistics through the Bureau of Justice Information and Analysis. The state reported 14,603 violent crimes in 2009, with a clearance rate (% solved) of 50%. The state reported 4,633 sexual assaults in 2009, with an overall clearance rate for sexual assaults of 57%.

== Economy ==
In 2025, Wisconsin's gross state product was $473 billion and its per capita personal income was $70,570. Wisconsin's economy is driven by manufacturing, agriculture, and tourism. As of May 2025, the state's unemployment rate was 3.3%. Since 2009, Wisconsin's minimum wage has been $7.25, the same as the federal rate. In 2025, 99.4% of businesses in Wisconsin were small businesses and they employed 48.0% of the state's workforce.

Eight corporations based in Wisconsin are listed on the Fortune 500. In 2024, the list included Northwestern Mutual, Fiserv, ManpowerGroup, Rockwell Automation, and WEC Energy Group (all based in Milwaukee), as well as Kohl's (based in Menomonee Falls), American Family Insurance (based in Madison), and Oshkosh Corporation (based in Oshkosh).

=== Manufacturing ===
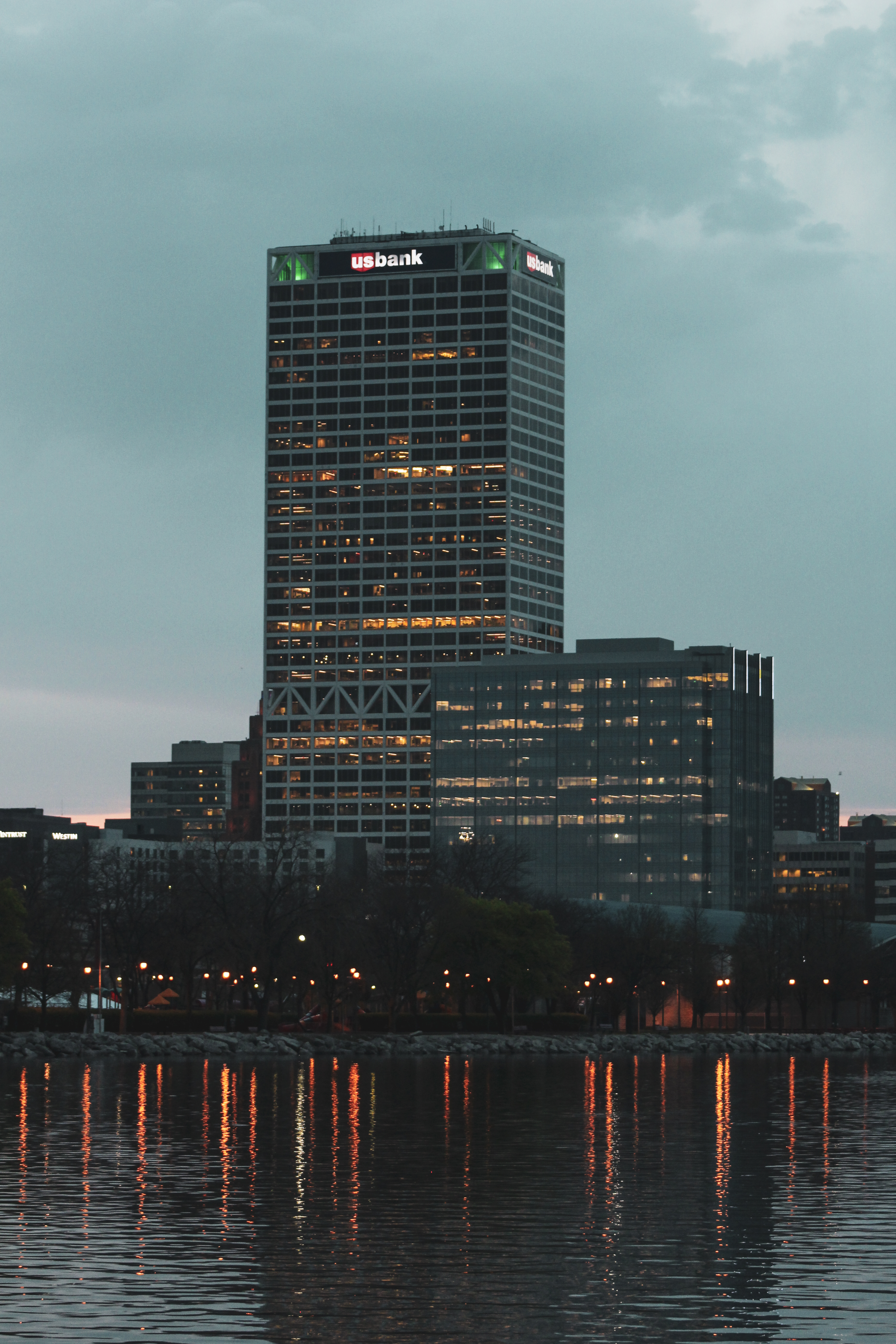
The U.S. Bank Center in downtown Milwaukee is home to the main headquarters of Baird, Foley & Lardner, and Sensient Technologies, as well as regional headquarters for U.S. Bank and IBM.

As of 2015, the number of manufacturing jobs in the state was approximately 500,000, similar to the figure in 1970. However, it declined as a share of the state's gross state product between 2000 and 2016 from about 21.5% to 18.5%, a proportion that is eighth among all states. Similarly, as a share of total employment, manufacturing declined from 28% in 1970 to 14% in 2015. The state's economic output from manufacturing was $48.9 billion in 2008, making it the tenth largest among states in manufacturing gross domestic product.

Major Wisconsin companies in manufacturing include the Kohler Company; Mercury Marine; Rockwell Automation; Johnson Controls; John Deere; Briggs & Stratton; Milwaukee Electric Tool Company; Miller Electric; Caterpillar Inc.; Joy Global; Oshkosh Corporation; Harley-Davidson; Case IH; S. C. Johnson & Son; Ashley Furniture; Ariens; and Evinrude Outboard Motors.

Wisconsin has a significant lumber industry, being a major producer of paper and packaging. Wisconsin ranks first nationwide in the production of paper products; the lower Fox River from Lake Winnebago to Green Bay has 24 paper mills along its 39 miles (63 km) stretch.

A large part of the state's manufacturing sector includes commercial food processing, including well-known brands such as Oscar Mayer, Tombstone frozen pizza, Johnsonville brats, and Usinger's sausage. Kraft Foods alone employs more than 5,000 people in the state. Milwaukee is a major producer of beer and was formerly headquarters for Miller Brewing Company—the nation's second-largest brewer—until it merged with Coors. Formerly, Schlitz, Blatz, and Pabst were cornerstone breweries in Milwaukee.

The development and manufacture of healthcare devices and software is a growing sector of the state's economy, with key players such as GE Healthcare, Epic Systems, and TomoTherapy.

=== Agriculture ===
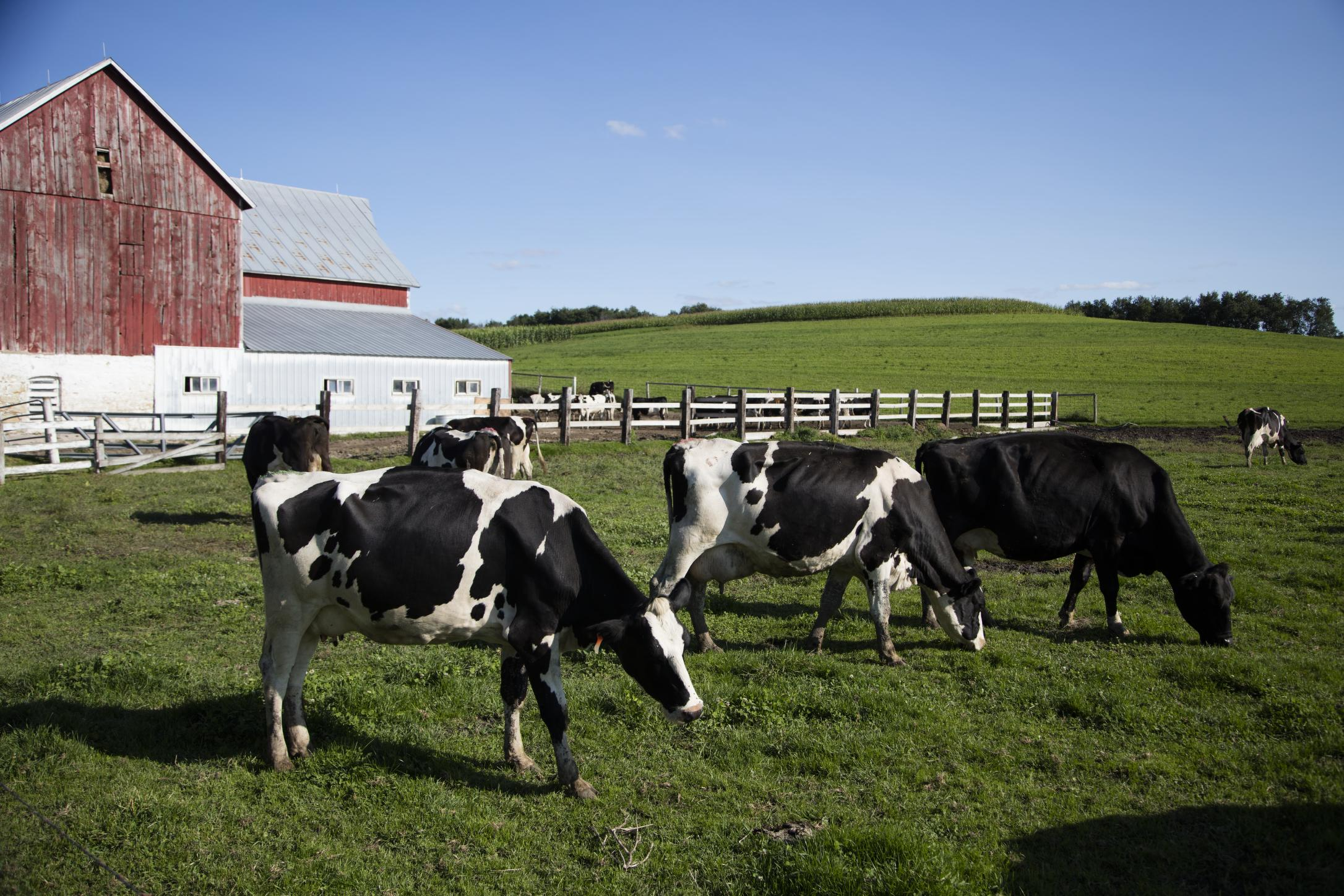
Dairy cows at a Wisconsin dairy farm

Wisconsin produces about a quarter of America's cheese, leading the nation in cheese production. It is second in milk production, after California, and third in per-capita milk production, behind California and Vermont. Wisconsin is second in butter production, producing about one-quarter of the nation's butter. Wisconsin requires cheese and butter makers to hold a license for production, being the only state in the US to require certification for either.

The state ranks first nationally in the production of corn for silage, cranberries, ginseng, and snap beans for processing. It grows more than half the national crop of cranberries. and 97% of the nation's ginseng. Wisconsin is also a leading producer of oats, potatoes, carrots, tart cherries, maple syrup, and sweet corn for processing.

The significance of the state's agricultural production is exemplified by the depiction of a Holstein cow, an ear of corn, and a wheel of cheese on Wisconsin's state quarter design. The state annually selects an "Alice in Dairyland" to promote the state's agricultural products around the world. The prominence of the dairy industry in Wisconsin has led to Wisconsin being known as "America's Dairyland", which was made the official state slogan in 1940.

=== Tourism ===
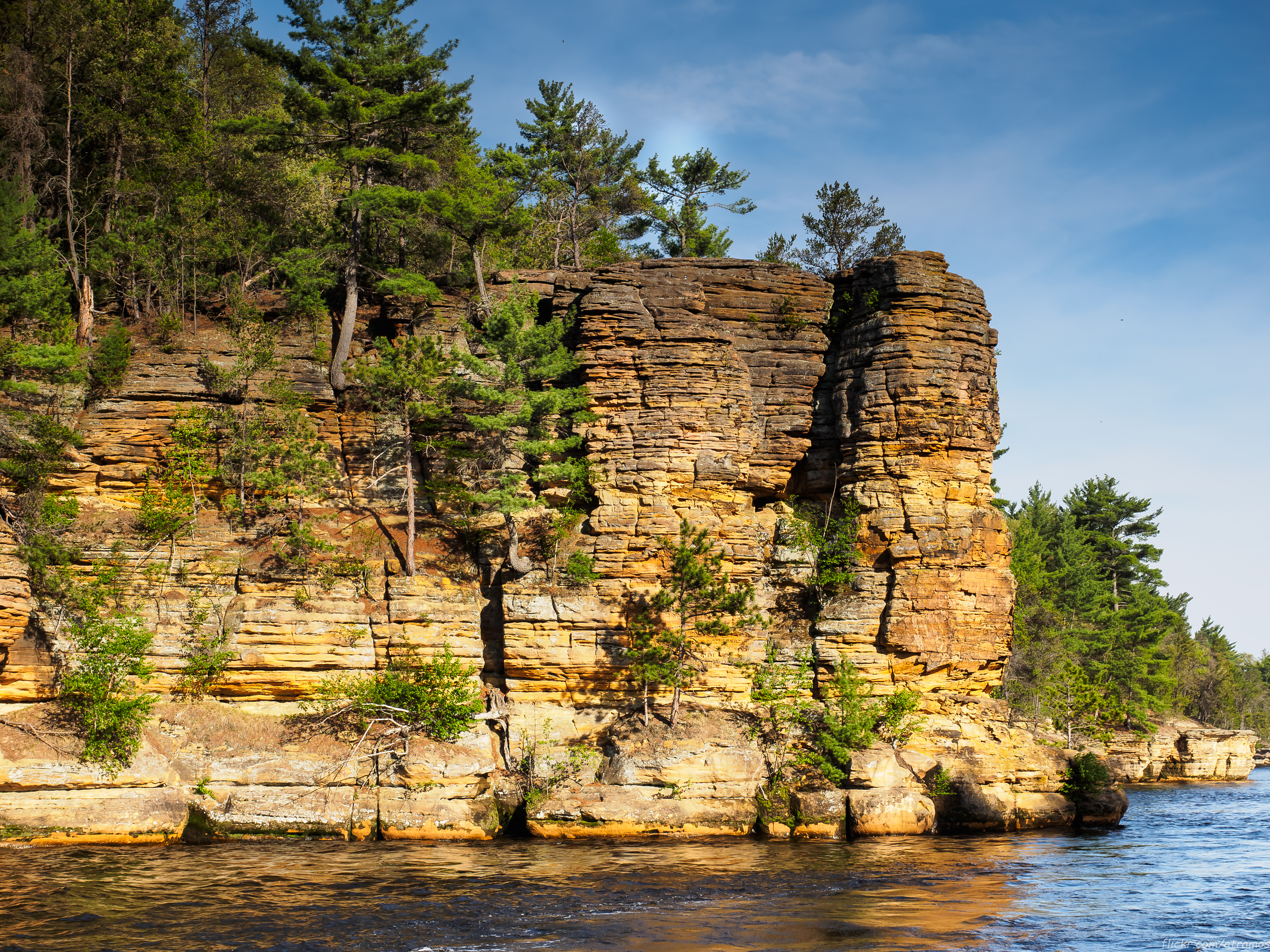
The Dells of the Wisconsin River form a tourism region focused on river features and nearby theme parks.

According to the Department of Tourism, tourism in Wisconsin generated $20.9 billion in total economic impact in 2021 and is the state's third-largest sector. Festivals such as Summerfest and the EAA AirVenture Oshkosh draw international attention, along with hundreds of thousands of visitors annually. Notable attractions across the state include the Harley-Davidson Museum, Lambeau Field, Milwaukee Art Museum, Chazen Museum of Art, Henry Vilas Zoo, National Railroad Museum, and Wisconsin State Capital. Other tourist destinations include Taliesin, the studio of architect Frank Lloyd Wright; House on the Rock, a complex of architecturally distinct rooms; and the Circus World Museum, located in the Ringling brothers' hometown of Baraboo.

The Dells of the Wisconsin River, a gorge noted for its rock formations in south-central Wisconsin, annually attracts more than four million visitors between water tours of the scenery and numerous theme parks in the region. Nearby Devil's Lake State Park is one of the most visited of Wisconsin's state parks due to its proximity to the Dells and its own scenery.

The Door Peninsula, which extends off the eastern coast of the state, contains Door County, a popular destination for boaters due to the large number of natural harbors and boat launches on both the Green Bay and Lake Michigan sides of the peninsula. The area draws more than two million visitors yearly to its quaint villages, seasonal cherry picking, and fish boils.

Given the large number of lakes and rivers in the state, water recreation is popular. In the Northwoods Lake Country, what had been an industrial area focused on timber has largely been transformed into a vacation destination. Popular interest in the environment and environmentalism, added to traditional interests in hunting and fishing, has attracted a large urban audience within driving range. Lake Geneva in southeastern Wisconsin is similarly popular for water recreation.

=== Energy ===
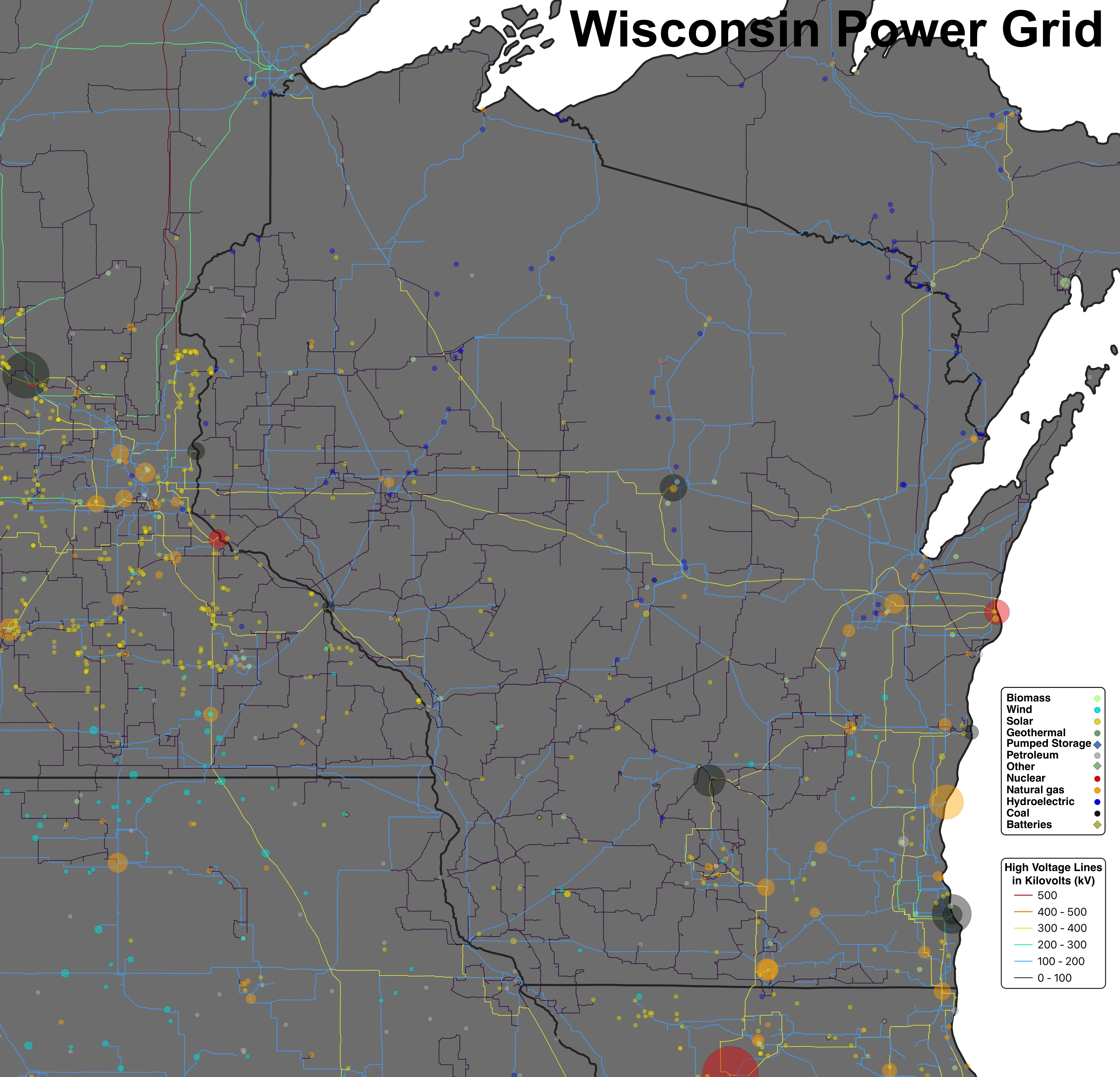
Wisconsin power grid

Wisconsin has no production of oil, gas, or coal. Its in-state electrical generation is mostly from coal. Other important electricity sources are natural gas and nuclear.

The state has a mandate that ten percent of its electrical energy come from renewable sources by the end of 2015. This goal has been met, but not with in-state sources. As of 2014, a third of that ten percent comes from out-of-state sources, mostly wind-generated electricity from Minnesota and Iowa. The state has agnostic policies for developing wind power in state.

=== Taxation ===
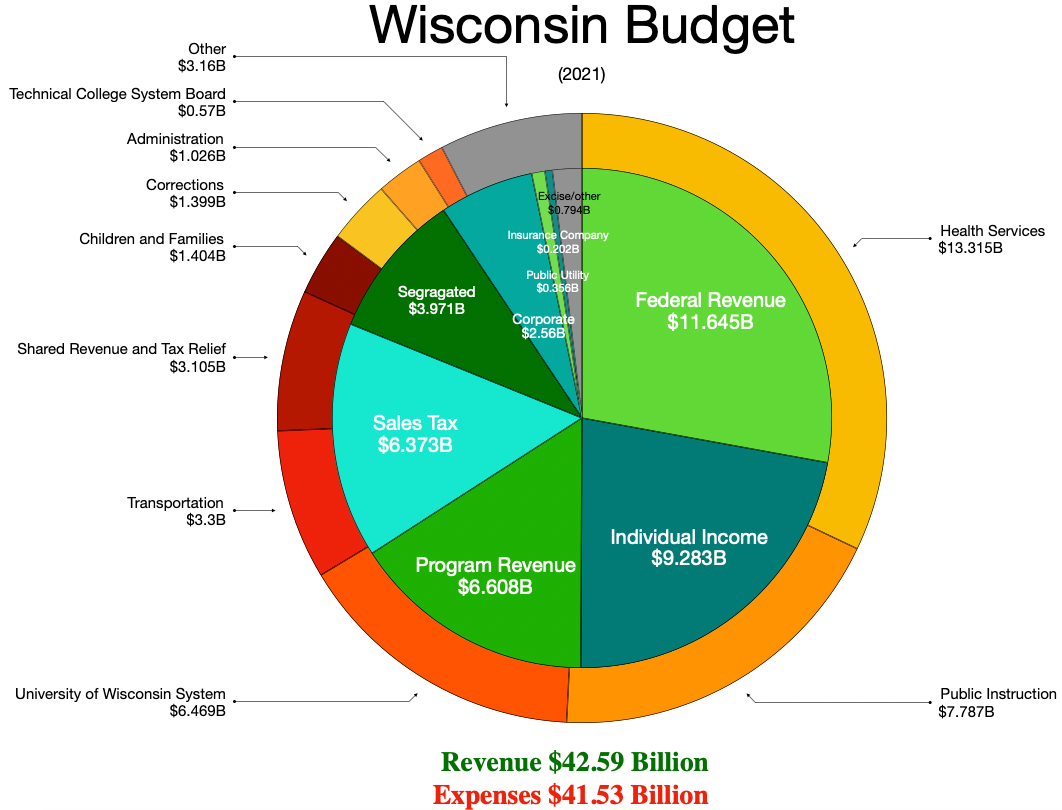
Wisconsin Budget (2021)

Wisconsin collects personal income taxes which range from 4% to 7.65% based on five income brackets. The state sales and use tax rate is 5.0%. Fifty-nine counties have an additional sales/use tax of 0.5%.

The most common property tax assessed on Wisconsin residents is the real property tax, or their residential property tax. Wisconsin does not impose a property tax on vehicles, but does levy an annual registration fee. Property taxes are the most important tax revenue source for Wisconsin's local governments, as well as major methods of funding school districts, vocational-technical colleges, special purpose districts and tax incremental finance districts. Equalized values are based on the full market value of all taxable property in the state, except for agricultural land. To provide property tax relief for farmers, the value of agricultural land is determined by its value for agricultural uses, rather than for its possible development value. Equalized values are used to distribute state aid payments to counties, municipalities, and technical colleges. Assessments prepared by local assessors are used to distribute the property tax burden within individual municipalities.

Wisconsin does not assess a tax on intangible property. Wisconsin does not collect inheritance taxes. Until January 1, 2008, Wisconsin's estate tax was decoupled from the federal estate tax laws; therefore the state imposed its own estate tax on certain large estates.

There are no toll roads in Wisconsin; highway construction and maintenance are funded in part by motor fuel tax revenues, and the remaining balance is drawn from the State General Fund. Non-highway road construction and maintenance are funded by local governments (municipalities or counties).

== Culture ==
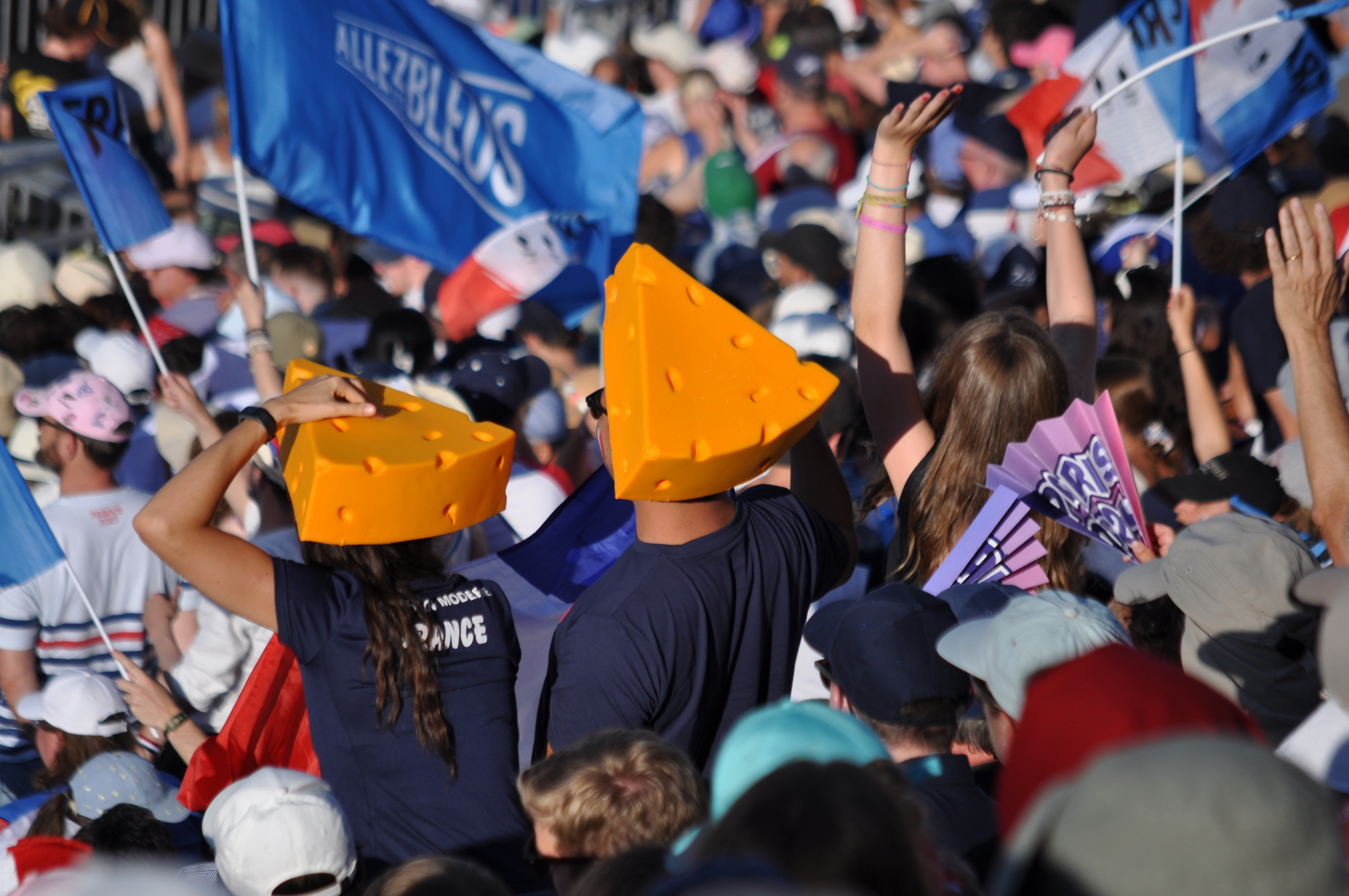
Cheesehead hats at the 2024 Summer Olympics

Residents of Wisconsin are called Wisconsinites. The traditional prominence of references to dairy farming and cheesemaking in Wisconsin's rural economy (the state's license plates have read "America's Dairyland" since 1940) have led to the nickname (sometimes used pejoratively among non-residents) of "cheeseheads", and to the creation of "cheesehead hats" made of yellow foam in the shape of a wedge of cheese.

Numerous ethnic festivals are held throughout Wisconsin to celebrate the heritage of its citizens. Such festivals include Summerfest, Oktoberfest, Polish Fest, Festa Italiana, Irish Fest, Bastille Days, Syttende Mai (Norwegian Constitution Day), Brat(wurst) Days in Sheboygan, Polka Days, Cheese Days in Monroe and Mequon, African World Festival, Indian Summer, Arab Fest, Wisconsin Highland Games, and many others.

=== Architecture ===
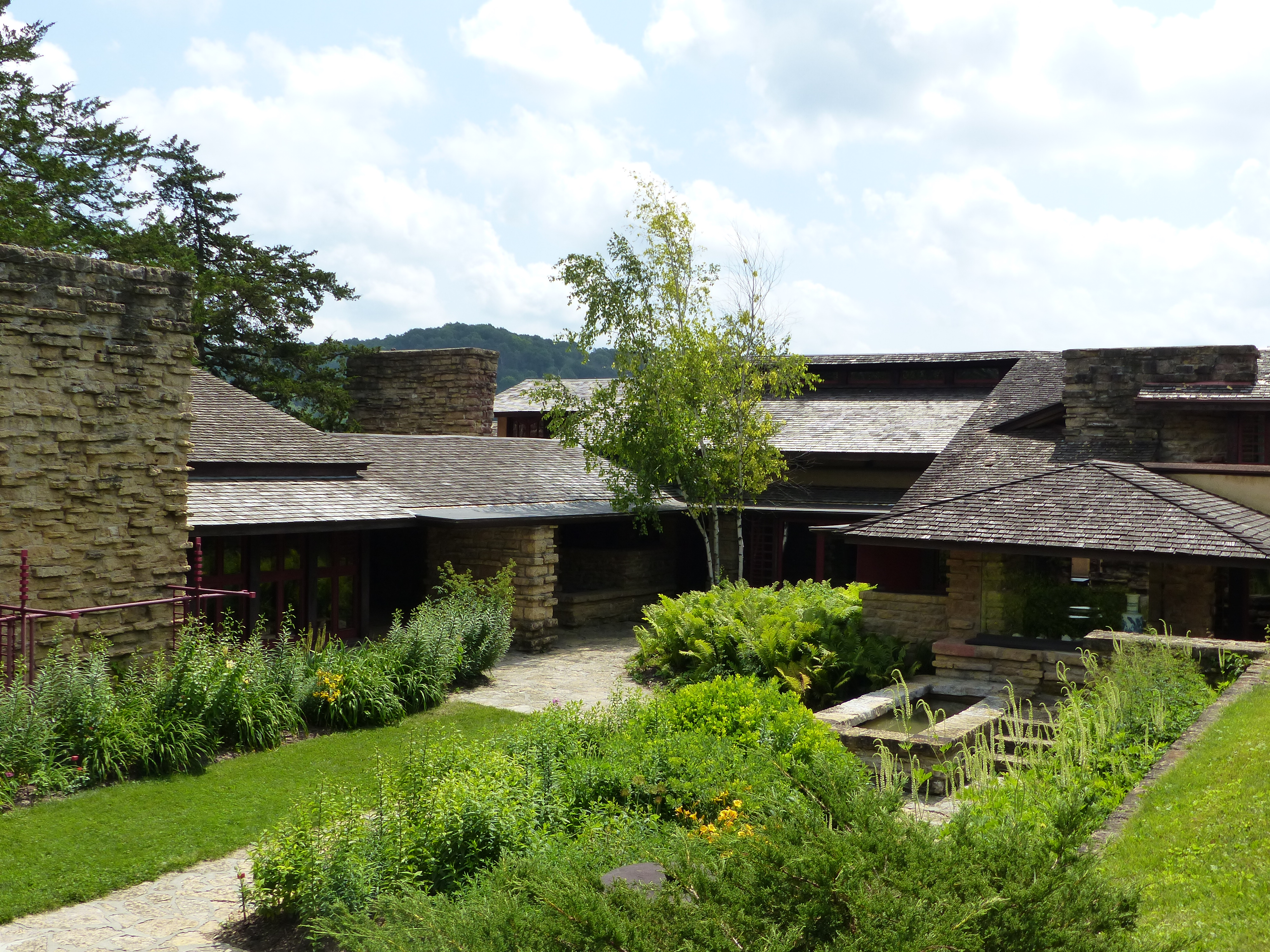
Taliesin was the studio of architect Frank Lloyd Wright.

With the immigration of northern Europeans into Wisconsin and the upper Midwest, they brought the techniques of building log homes with them.

The Milwaukee Art Museum is known for its Quadracci Pavilion created by Spanish architect Santiago Calatrava. The pavilion contains a movable, wing-like Burke brise soleil that opens up for a wingspan of 217 feet (66 m) during the day, folding over the tall, arched structure at night or during inclement weather.

Frank Lloyd Wright, an architect known as the pioneer of Prairie School architecture and the Usonian home concept, was raised in Wisconsin. Wright's home and studio in the 20th century was at Taliesin, south of Spring Green, Wisconsin. Taliesin and the Usonian Jacobs I House in Madison are listed as UNESCO World Heritage Sites as part of "The 20th-Century Architecture of Frank Lloyd Wright". Other notable works of Wright in Wisconsin include the Annunciation Greek Orthodox Church in Wauwatosa, First Unitarian Society of Madison, and Johnson Wax Headquarters. Monona Terrace in Madison, a convention center designed by Taliesin architect Anthony Puttnam, is based on a 1930s design by Wright.

=== Alcohol ===
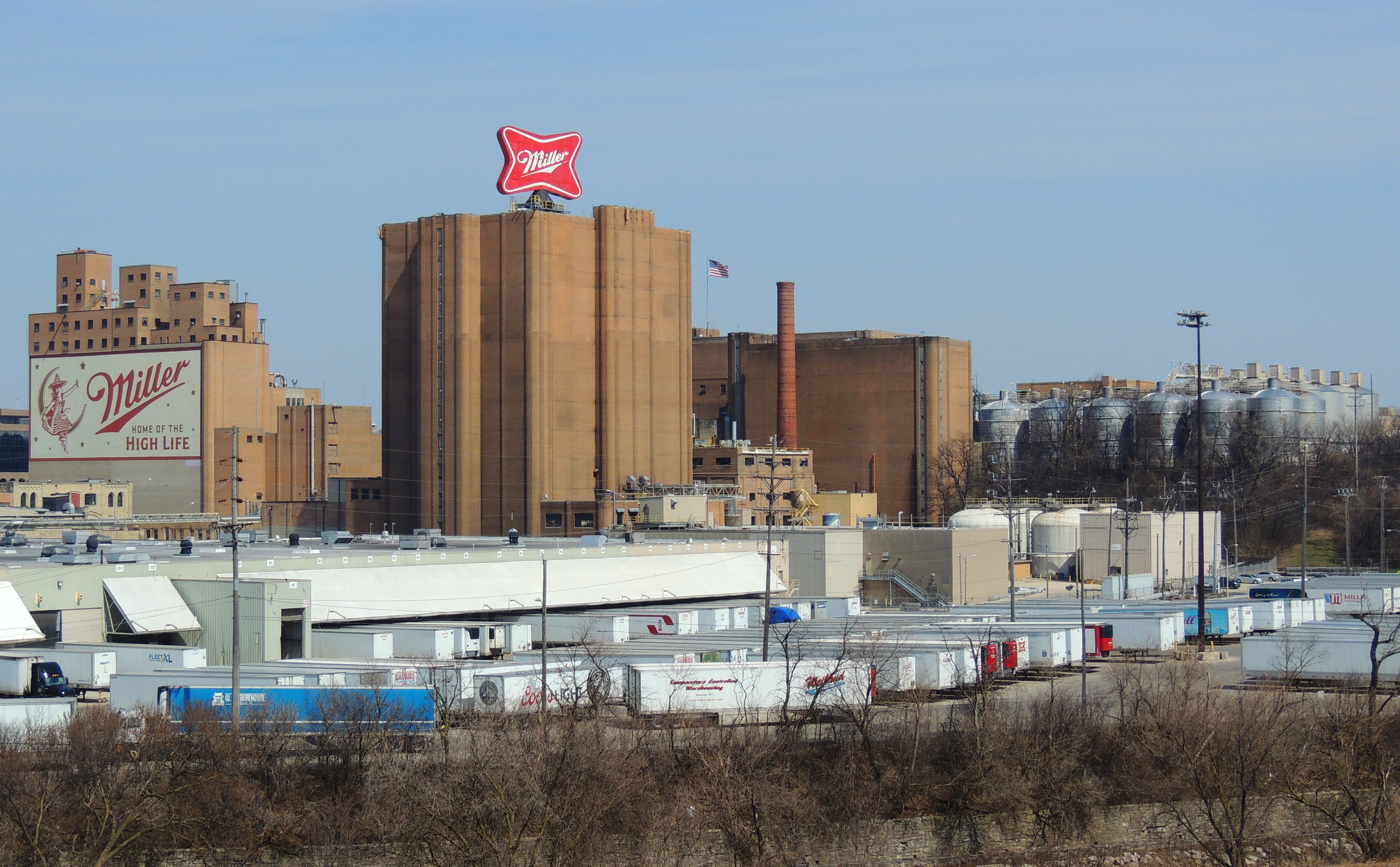
The Miller Brewery in Milwaukee

Drinking alcohol has long been considered a significant part of Wisconsin culture, and the state ranks at or near the top of national measures of per-capita alcohol consumption, consumption of alcohol per state, and proportion of drinkers. Consumption per-capita per-event, however, ranks low among the nation; number of events (number of times alcohol is involved) is significantly higher or highest, but consumption at each event smaller, marking Wisconsin's consumption as frequent and moderate. Factors such as cultural identification with the state's heritage of German immigration, the long-standing presence of major breweries in Milwaukee, and a cold climate are often associated with the prevalence of drinking in Wisconsin.

Many large breweries were founded in Wisconsin, largely in Milwaukee, which gained the epithet "Brew City" before the turn of the century. Miller Brewing Company, Pabst Brewing Company, Joseph Schlitz Brewing Company, and Jacob Leinenkugel Brewing Company all began as local businesses before entering national markets. Several other popular craft brews include Ale Asylum, Capital, Sprecher, and New Glarus, the latter being well known for the Spotted Cow Farmhouse Ale only sold in Wisconsin.

In Wisconsin, the legal drinking age is 21, except when accompanied by a parent, guardian, or spouse who is at least 21 years old. Age requirements are waived for possessing alcohol when employed by a brewer, brewpub, wholesaler, or producer of alcohol fuel. The minimum legal age to purchase alcohol is 21, with no exceptions. The Absolute Sobriety law states that any person not of legal drinking age (currently 21) may not drive after consuming alcohol. DUI offenses were lowered to BAC 0.08 in 2003 as a result of federal government pressure.

=== Cuisine ===
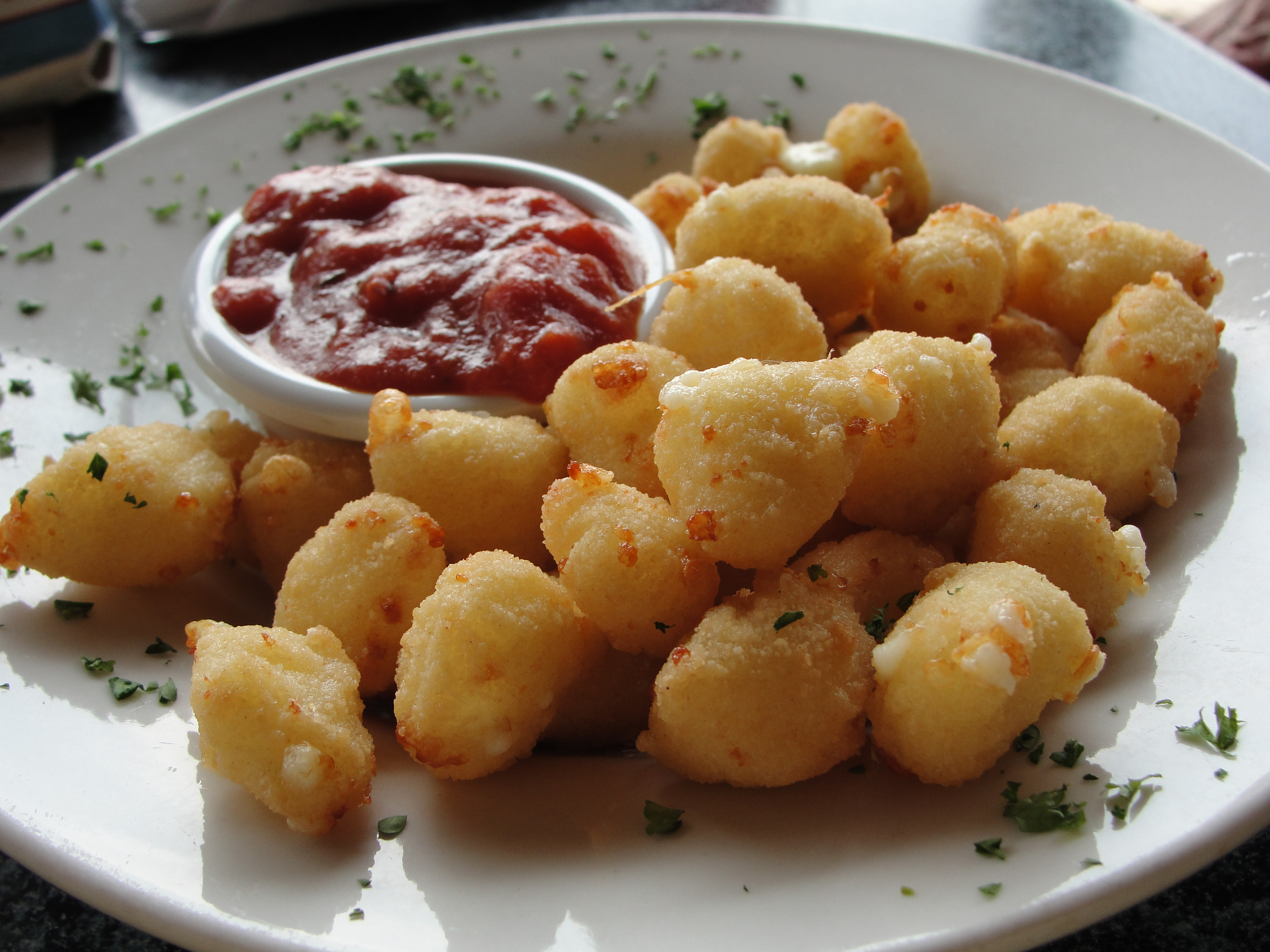
Fried cheese curds

Wisconsin's cuisine is famous for its cheese as well as other dairy products. Colby cheese was first created in Wisconsin in 1885 (named after Colby, Wisconsin), and brick cheese was first created in the state in 1877. The state is the only producer of Limburger cheese in the United States. Cheese curds are a popular variant that can be eaten separately cold as a snack, or covered in batter and fried as an appetizer, often served with ranch dressing as a dipping sauce. Hot and spicy cheese bread is a popular type of bread created and sold in Madison.

Wisconsin is the nation's top producer of cheese, the state's official dairy product. It is also a leading producer of cranberries, the state's official fruit, and ginseng. Dane County Farmers' Market in Madison is the nation's largest producers-only farmer's market.

The Friday night fish fry, often battered and fried perch or walleye, is traditional throughout Wisconsin, while in northeast Wisconsin and Door County the fish boil is more popular. The supper club is another common phenomenon of Wisconsin culinary heritage and often a destination for fish frys; other fried food are common side dishes, along with condiments of tartar sauce and cole slaw or crimson slaw, a variety of cole slaw that incorporates Wisconsin cranberries. Beer cheese soup is usually made from a variety of beer and cheddar or Colby cheese with sausage, potatoes, and green onions.

Booyah is a stew common to Wisconsin, commonly using meat and a mirepoix of vegetables cooked together in a "booyah kettle" over low heat for several days.

The southeastern city of Racine is known for its kringle, a sweet flaky pastry often served as a dessert. The recipe was brought by Danish immigrants to the region in the 1800s and became the official state pastry of Wisconsin in 2013. The Wisconsin State Fair is known for its giant cream puffs.

The butter burger originated in Wisconsin, most likely in Solly's Grille in Glendale. Culver's is a midwestern fast casual food restaurant chain originally from Sauk City and currently headquartered in Prairie du Sac known for serving butter burgers, fried cheese curds, and frozen custard. La Croix Sparkling Water originates from La Crosse.

=== Music ===
Milwaukee hosts Summerfest, dubbed "The World's Largest Music Festival", every year The festival is held at the lakefront Henry Maier Festival Park just south of downtown, as are a summer-long array of ethnic musical festivals. The Wisconsin Area Music Industry hosts an annual awards show for top Wisconsin artists. The Mile of Music in Appleton is an annual all-original music festival of varying styles. It focuses on undiscovered touring musicians and bands. Other music festivals include Hoofbeat country fest, Country Jam USA, the Hodag Country Festival, Lifest, Porterfield Country Music Festival, Country Thunder USA in Twin Lakes, and Country USA.

=== Recreation ===
The varied landscape of Wisconsin makes the state a popular vacation destination for outdoor recreation. Winter events include skiing, ice fishing and snowmobile derbies. Wisconsin is situated on two Great Lakes and has many inland lakes of varied size; the state contains 11,188 square miles (28,980 km^{2}) of water, more than all but three other states—Alaska, Michigan, and Florida. The Wisconsin Shipwreck Coast National Marine Sanctuary was established in 2021 in the waters of Lake Michigan off Wisconsin and is the site of a large number of historically significant shipwrecks.

Outdoor activities are popular in Wisconsin, especially hunting and fishing. One of the most prevalent game animals is the whitetail deer. Each year in Wisconsin, well over 600,000 deer-hunting licenses are sold. In 2008, the Wisconsin Department of Natural Resources projected the pre-hunt deer population to be between 1.5 and 1.7 million.

=== Sports ===
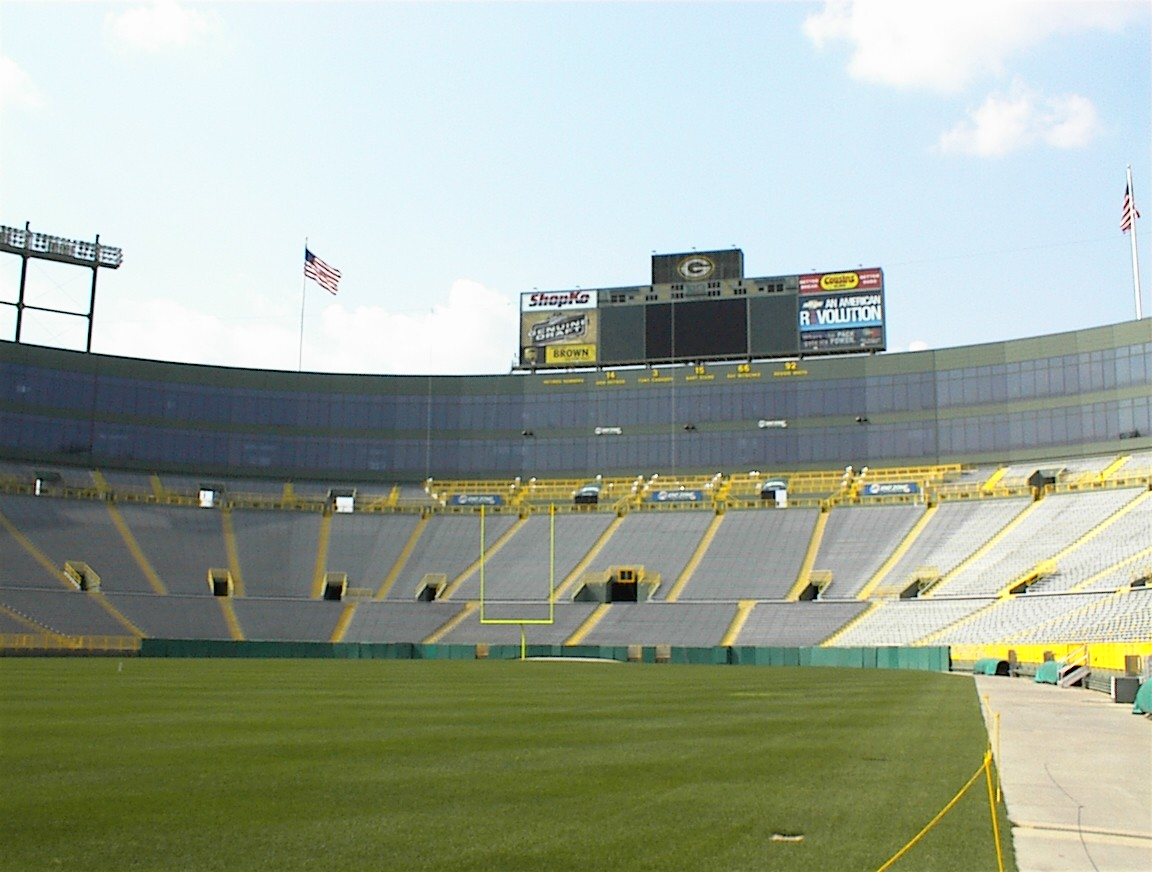
Lambeau Field is home to the publicly owned Green Bay Packers of the National Football League.

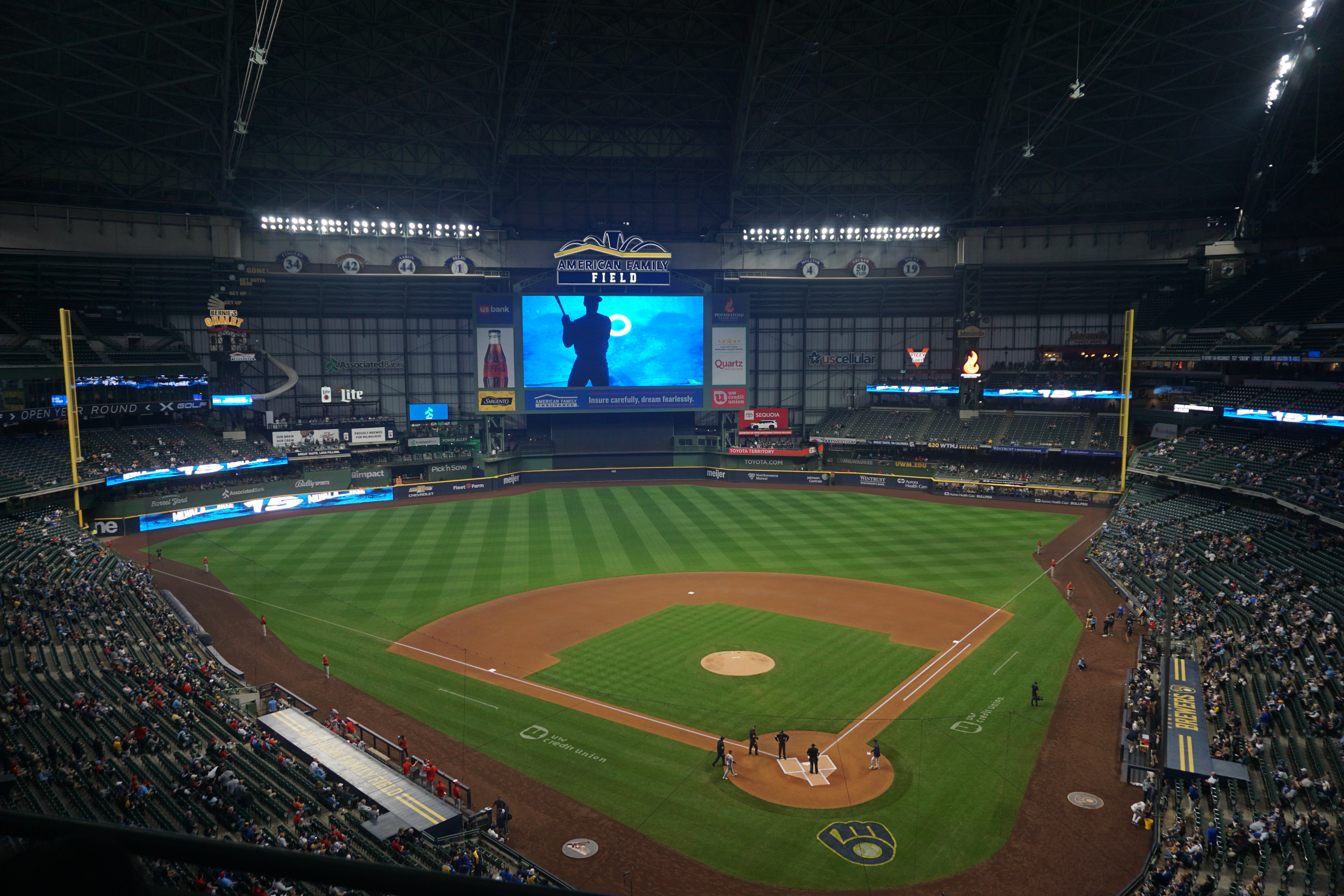
American Family Field is home to the Milwaukee Brewers, one of two professional sports teams based in Milwaukee.

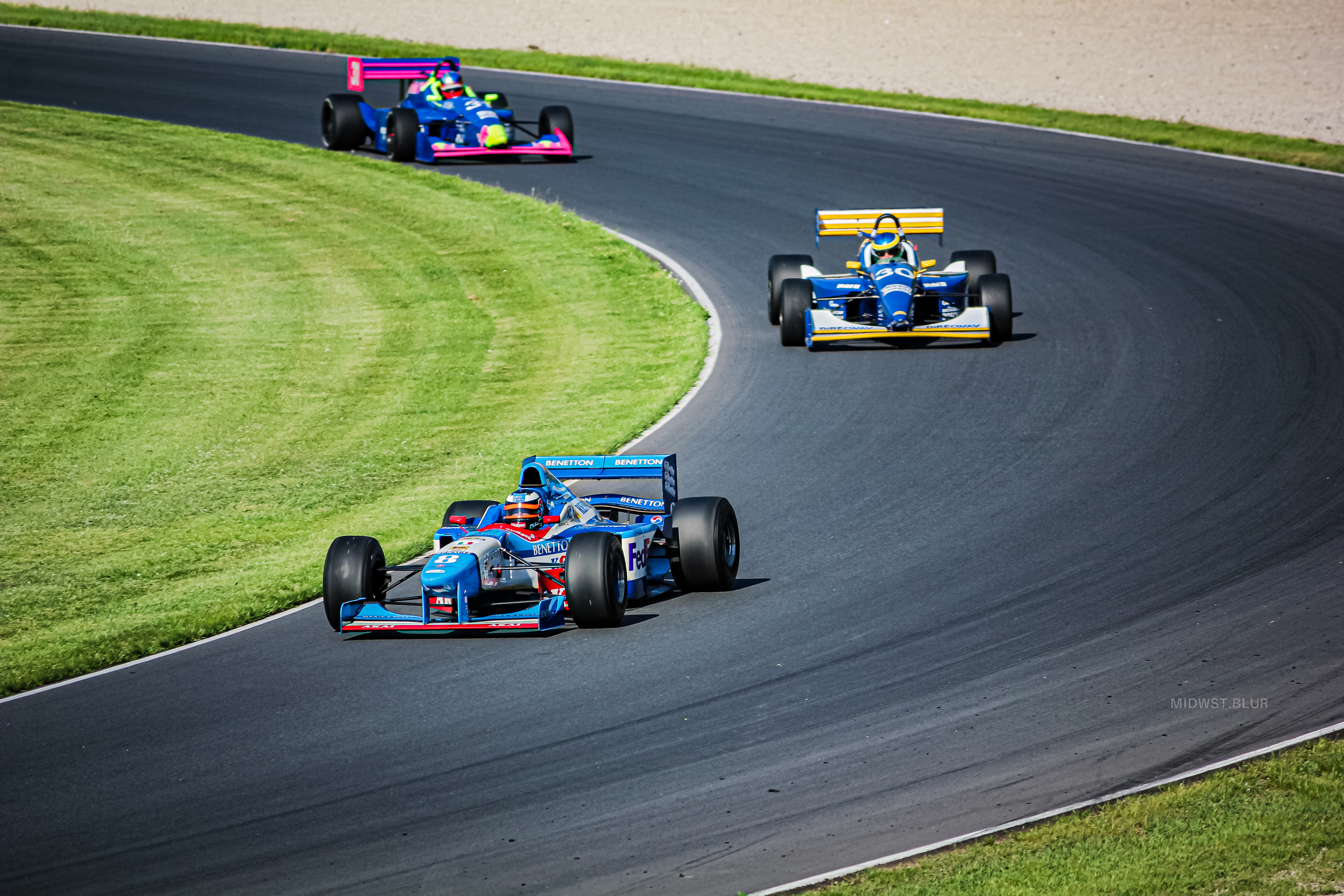
Road America, near Elkhart Lake, has hosted motorsport races since the 1950s.

Wisconsin is represented by major league teams in three sports: football, baseball, and basketball. Lambeau Field, located in Green Bay, Wisconsin, is home to the National Football League's Green Bay Packers. The Packers have been part of the NFL since the league's second season in 1921 and are the smallest city franchise in the NFL, and the only one owned by shareholders statewide. The Milwaukee Brewers, the state's only major league baseball team, have played in American Family Field in Milwaukee since 2001. Before the Brewers, Milwaukee had two prior Major League teams. The first team, also called the Brewers, played only one season in 1901 before becoming the St. Louis Browns. Milwaukee was also the home of the now-Atlanta Braves franchise when they moved from Boston from 1953 to 1965, winning the World Series in 1957. The Milwaukee Bucks of the National Basketball Association play home games at the Fiserv Forum.

The state also has minor league teams in hockey (Milwaukee Admirals) and baseball (the Wisconsin Timber Rattlers, based in Appleton and the Beloit Sky Carp of the High-A minor leagues). In addition to these affiliated minor league teams, Wisconsin has two American Association of Professional Baseball teams, being the Milwaukee Milkmen based in Franklin, and the Lake Country DockHounds based in Oconomowoc. Wisconsin is also home to nine Northwoods League teams. The Madison Mallards, the La Crosse Loggers, the Lakeshore Chinooks, the Eau Claire Express, the Fond du Lac Dock Spiders, the Green Bay Rockers, the Kenosha Kingfish, the Wausau Woodchucks, and the Wisconsin Rapids Rafters all play in a collegiate all-star summer league. In addition to the Packers, Green Bay is also the home to an indoor football team, the Green Bay Blizzard of the IFL. The state is home to the seven-time MISL/MASL Champion Milwaukee Wave. Wisconsin is also home to Forward Madison FC, which is a professional soccer team that plays in the USL League One. The Northern Elite Football League consists of many amateur semi-pro teams from Wisconsin.

Wisconsin also has many college sports programs, including the NCAA Division I Wisconsin Badgers, Milwaukee Panthers, and Green Bay Phoenix. The Marquette Golden Eagles of the Big East Conference, the state's other major collegiate program, is known for its men's basketball team. Many other schools in the University of Wisconsin system compete in the Wisconsin Intercollegiate Athletic Conference at the Division III level. The conference is one of the most successful in the nation, claiming 107 NCAA national championships in 15 different sports as of March 30, 2015.

The Milwaukee Mile, an oval track opened in 1903, is the oldest operating motorsports venue in the world, having hosted the IndyCar Series and NASCAR. Road America near Elkhart Lake hosts races in the IndyCar Series, IMSA SportsCar Championship, Sports Car Club of America GT World Challenge America and Trans-Am Series and the MotoAmerica Superbike Championship. Dirt tracks are also popular, with the World of Outlaws and High Limit Racing both going to different tracks.

The World Championship Snowmobile Derby is held at Eagle River, Wisconsin. The world championship off-road racing event is held at Crandon International Off-Road Raceway.

Wisconsin is home to the nation's oldest operating velodrome in Kenosha where races have been held every year since 1927.

Sheboygan is home to Whistling Straits golf club which has hosted PGA Championships in 2004, 2010 and 2015 and the Ryder Cup golf competition between USA and Europe in 2020. The Greater Milwaukee Open, later named the U.S. Bank Championship in Milwaukee, was a PGA Tour tournament from 1968 to 2009 held annually in Brown Deer. In 2017, Erin Hills, a golf course in Erin, Wisconsin, approximately 30 miles northwest of Milwaukee, hosted the U.S. Open.

== Government and politics ==
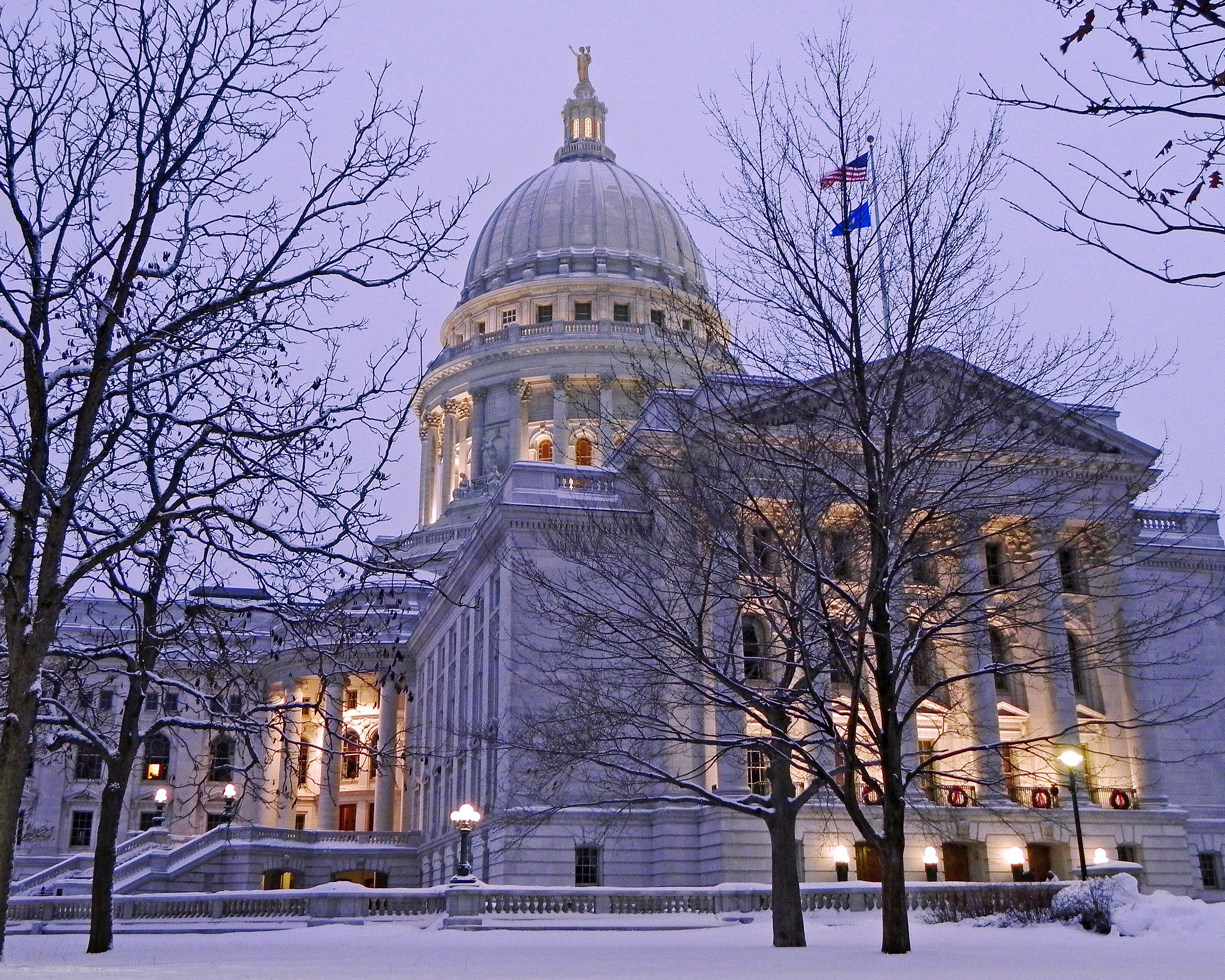
The Wisconsin State Capitol is located on the isthmus between Lake Mendota and Lake Monona, in the city of Madison.

The Constitution of Wisconsin outlines the structure and function of state government, which is organized into three branches: executive, legislative, and judicial. The Wisconsin Blue Book is the primary published reference about the government and politics of the state. Re-published every two years, copies are available from state legislators. The law of the Menominee also applies within the Menominee Indian Reservation.

=== State government ===
The executive branch is headed by the Governor of Wisconsin. The current governor, Tony Evers, assumed office on January 7, 2019. The Wisconsin Constitution grants the governor a veto on bills passed by the state legislature as well as a line-item veto on appropriation bills. A lieutenant governor succeeds the governor in the event of any removal from office and performs any duties assigned by the governor. The current lieutenant governor is Sara Rodriguez. The other elected constitutional offices in the executive branch are the secretary of state (Sarah Godlewski), treasurer (John Leiber), attorney general (Josh Kaul), and the non-partisan superintendent of public instruction (Jill Underly).

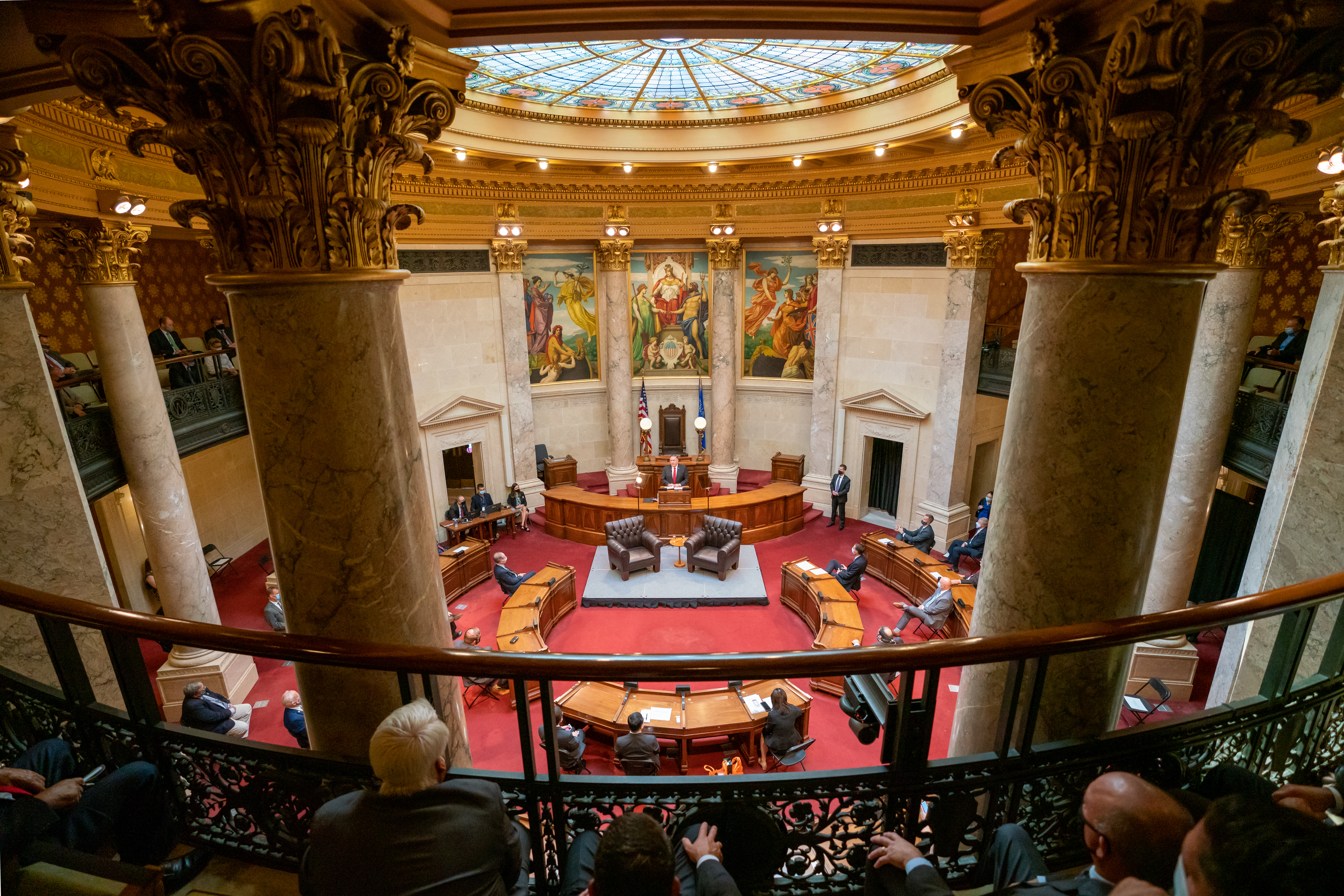
The Senate Chamber of the Wisconsin State Capitol

The Wisconsin State Legislature is Wisconsin's legislative branch. The Legislature is a bicameral body consisting of the Wisconsin State Assembly and the Wisconsin State Senate. The Assembly has 99 members, and the Senate has 33 members. All 99 members of the Wisconsin Assembly are elected in a two-year term cycle without term limits. Similarly, all 33 members of the Wisconsin Senate are elected in a four-year cycle, also without term limits. Half of the Senate is elected every two years. Members of both houses of the Legislature vote within their ranks to select presiding officers, such as the Speaker of the Assembly and the President of the Senate. Legislators in both the Senate and the Assembly receive an annual salary of $55,141. Over two years, each legislator is allotted $66,008 to cover general office expenses, printing, postage and district mailings.

Wisconsin's court system has four levels: municipal courts, circuit courts, the Court of Appeals, and the Supreme Court. Municipal courts typically handle cases involving local ordinance matters. The circuit courts are Wisconsin's trial courts, they have original jurisdiction in all civil and criminal cases within the state. Challenges to circuit court rulings are heard by the Wisconsin Court of Appeals, consisting of sixteen judges who typically sit in three-judge panels. As the state's highest appellate court, the Wisconsin Supreme Court may hear both appeals from lower courts and original actions. In addition to deciding cases, the Supreme Court is responsible for administering the state's court system and regulating the practice of law in Wisconsin.

=== Federal representation ===
Following the 2020 census reapportionment, Wisconsin has eight seats in the U.S. House of Representatives. As of the 119th United States Congress, six federal representatives are Republicans while two are Democrats. Gwen Moore is the most senior member of the Wisconsin delegation to the U.S. House of Representatives, while the least senior is Tony Wied. Wisconsin's senior U.S. senator, Ron Johnson, is a Republican, while its junior, Tammy Baldwin, is a Democrat.

Wisconsin is under the appellate jurisdiction of the United States Court of Appeals for the Seventh Circuit, which includes district courts for the Eastern District of Wisconsin and Western District of Wisconsin.

=== Politics ===
2024 United States presidential election in Wisconsin
Results by county
Democratic
Republican

Results by municipality

Since 2016, Wisconsin has been considered a swing state at the federal level, being won by either the Democratic or Republican nominees. Republican Donald Trump won the state by 0.87% in the 2024 presidential election; it had the closest margin of any state in that election. Democrat Joe Biden won the state by a narrow margin of 0.63% in 2020; Trump won Wisconsin in 2016 by a similarly narrow margin of 0.77%, the first time the state voted for a Republican presidential nominee since 1984. Wisconsin was part of the blue wall, a group of states the Democratic Party won in each presidential election from 1992 to 2012. Since achieving statehood in 1848, Wisconsin has been won by Republican presidential candidates 26 times, Democrats 18 times, and once by the Progressive Party.

At the statewide level, Wisconsin is competitive, with control regularly alternating between the two parties. Following the 2014 general elections, the governor, lieutenant governor, attorney general, and treasurer were all Republicans, while the secretary of state was a Democrat. However, in 2018, Democrats won all constitutional statewide offices on the ballot, the first time this happened in Wisconsin since 1982. Among Wisconsin's 46 governors, 32 were Republicans, 12 were Democrats, one was a Whig, and two were Wisconsin Progressive Party members.

In a 2020 study, Wisconsin was ranked as the 25th easiest state for citizens to vote in. Some have argued the state has experienced democratic backsliding since 2011. Some political scientists classify Wisconsin as a hybrid regime; the state's House of Representative and legislature elections are considered to be free but not fair, with districts undergoing "extreme partisan gerrymanders" to entrench Republicans "beyond electoral rotation". The Wisconsin Supreme Court overturned the legislative gerrymander in the 2023 ruling of Clarke v. Wisconsin Elections Commission.

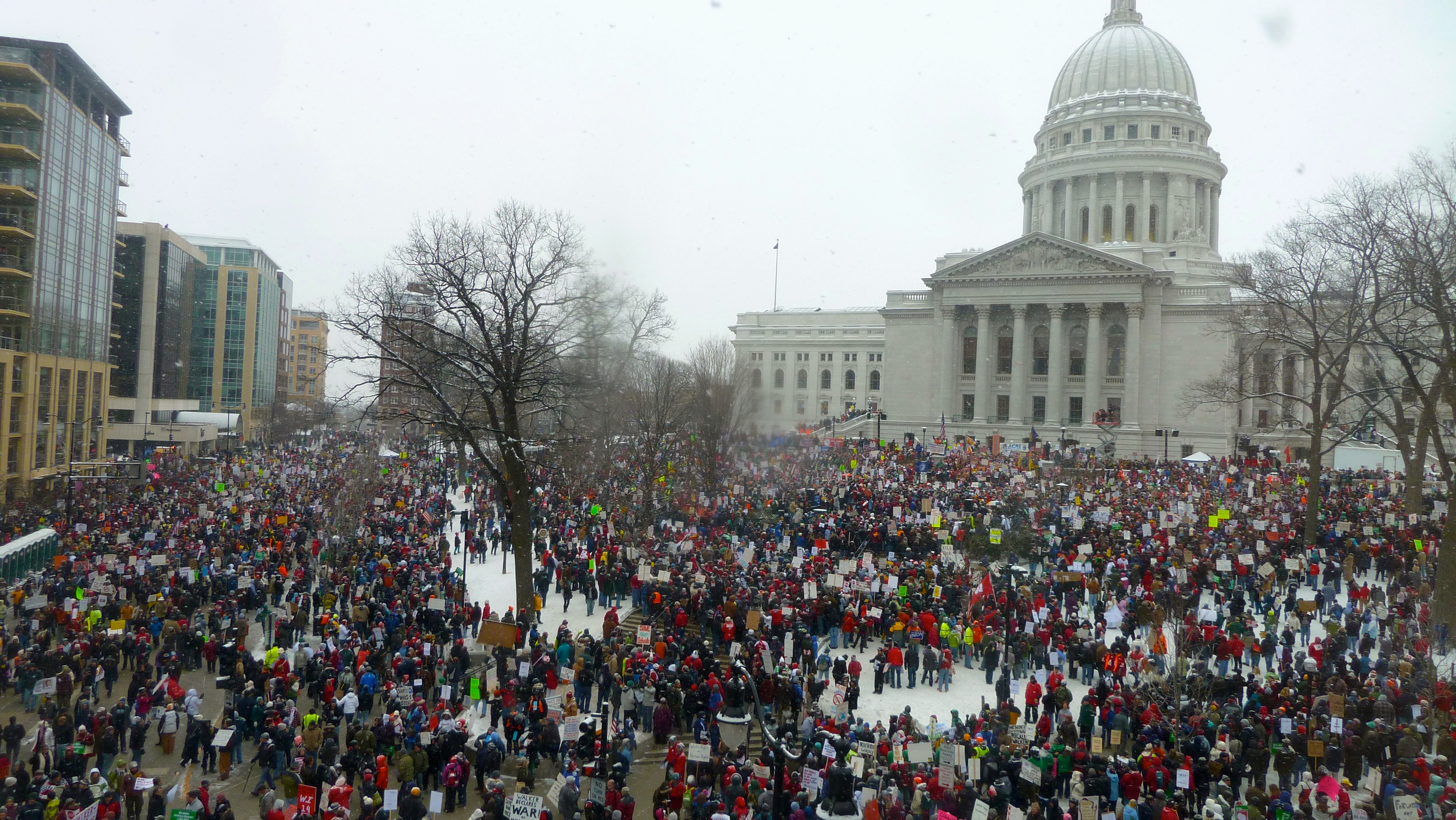
The 2011 Wisconsin Act 10 led to large protests around the state capitol building in Madison.

During the American Civil War, Wisconsin was a historically Republican state; in fact, it is the state that gave birth to the Republican Party, although ethno-religious issues in the late 19th century caused a brief split in the coalition. The Bennett Law campaign of 1890 controversially required English as the sole medium of instruction in all schools, and Germans switched to the Democratic Party because the Republican Party supported the law.

Wisconsin's political history is broad in scope, encompassing Robert La Follette and the Progressive movement to prominent anti-communist Joseph McCarthy. From the early 20th century, the Socialist Party of America had a base in Milwaukee. The phenomenon was referred to as "sewer socialism" because the elected officials were more concerned with public works and reform than with revolution (although revolutionary socialism existed in the city as well). Its influence faded in the late 1950s largely because of the red scare and racial tensions. The first socialist mayor of a large city in the United States was Emil Seidel, elected mayor of Milwaukee in 1910; the city elected three more socialist mayors in Daniel Hoan, Frank P. Zeidler, and Henry Maier. Socialist newspaper editor Victor Berger was repeatedly elected as a U.S. Representative.

Through the first half of the 20th century, Wisconsin's politics were dominated by Robert La Follette and his sons, originally of the Republican Party and later of the Wisconsin Progressive Party. Since 1945, the state has maintained a close balance between Republicans and Democrats. Wisconsin Congressman Paul Ryan was the Republican vice-presidential nominee in the 2012 election, alongside Mitt Romney, and later served as 54th speaker of the House of Representatives.

=== International relations ===
Wisconsin has sister-state relationships with Hesse in Germany, Chiba Prefecture in Japan, Jalisco in Mexico, Heilongjiang in China, and Nicaragua. A Mexican consulate opened in Milwaukee on July 1, 2016.

== Education ==
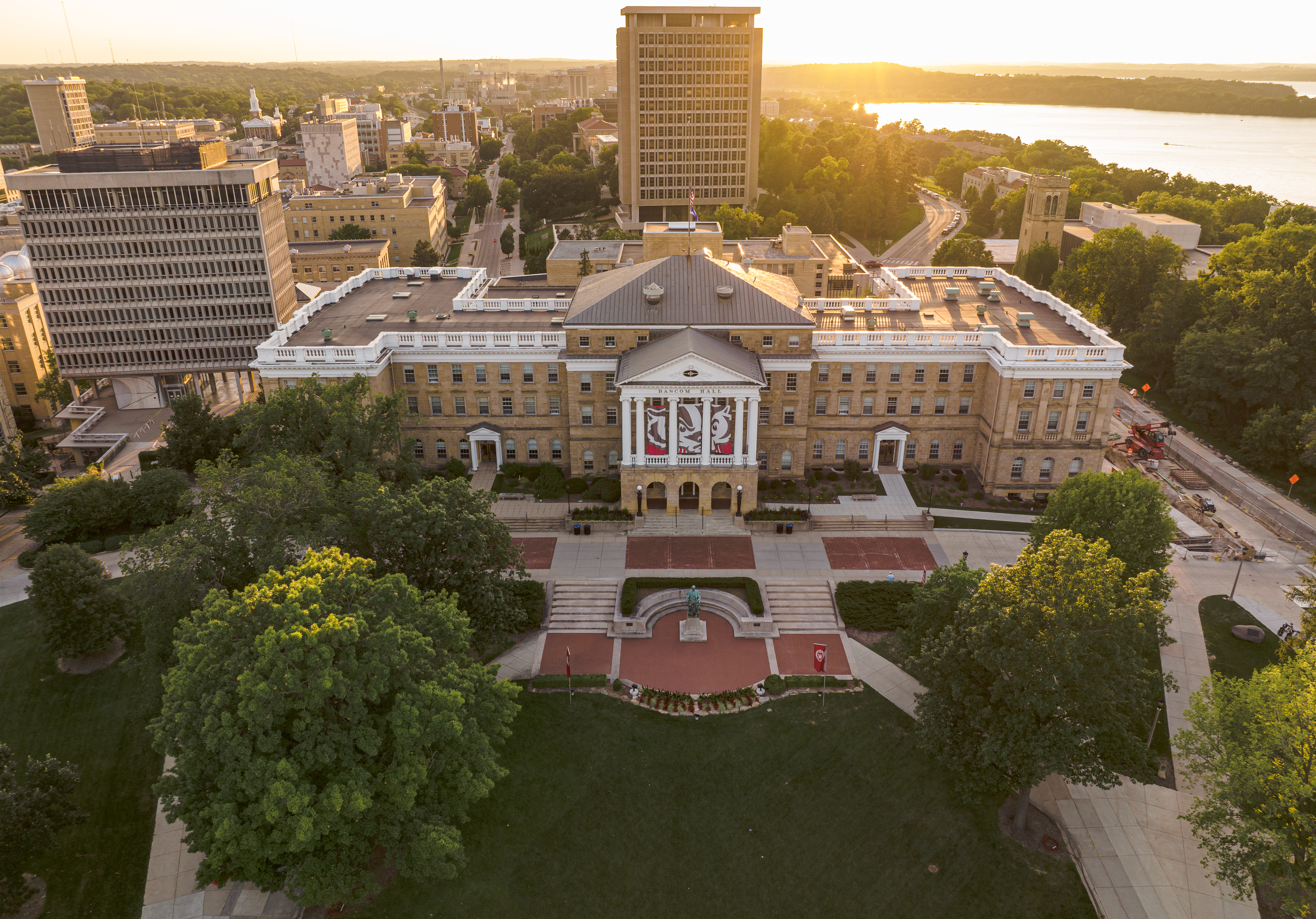
The University of Wisconsin–Madison is the flagship campus of the University of Wisconsin System.

Wisconsin, along with Michigan and Minnesota, was among the Midwestern leaders in the emergent American state university movement following the American Civil War. By the start of the 20th century, education in the state advocated the "Wisconsin Idea", which emphasized service to the people of the state. The "Wisconsin Idea" exemplified the Progressive movement within colleges and universities at the time.

The Wisconsin Department of Public Instruction is the state education and public library management agency in the state. The department is led by the State Superintendent of Public Instruction, a non-partisan, constitutional officer elected every four years in the spring primary, six months after the previous year's presidential election.

Public post-secondary education in Wisconsin consists of two organizations. The University of Wisconsin System comprises the state's two tier 1 research universities as classified by the Carnegie Foundation: the flagship University of Wisconsin–Madison, and the University of Wisconsin–Milwaukee. The system has eleven other comprehensive universities and ten two-year branch campuses. It is one of the largest public higher education systems in the country, enrolling more than 160,000 students each year and employing approximately 41,000 faculty and staff statewide. The 16-campus Wisconsin Technical College System awards two-year associate degrees, one- and two-year technical diplomas, and short-term technical diplomas and certificates. It also provides training and technical assistance to Wisconsin's business and industry community.

Carroll University was Wisconsin's first institution of higher education. It was chartered by the territorial legislature on January 31, 1846, and temporarily suspended operations during the Civil War. Beloit College is the state's oldest continuously operated college, chartered on February 2, 1846. Marquette University is a tier 2 research university and Wisconsin's largest private university by enrollment. It became the world's first coeducational Catholic university in 1909. Other private colleges and universities include Alverno College, Carthage College, Concordia University Wisconsin, Edgewood University, Lakeland University, Lawrence University, Medical College of Wisconsin, Milwaukee School of Engineering, Ripon College, St. Norbert College, Wisconsin Lutheran College, and Viterbo University.

== Transportation ==
Wisconsin Highways

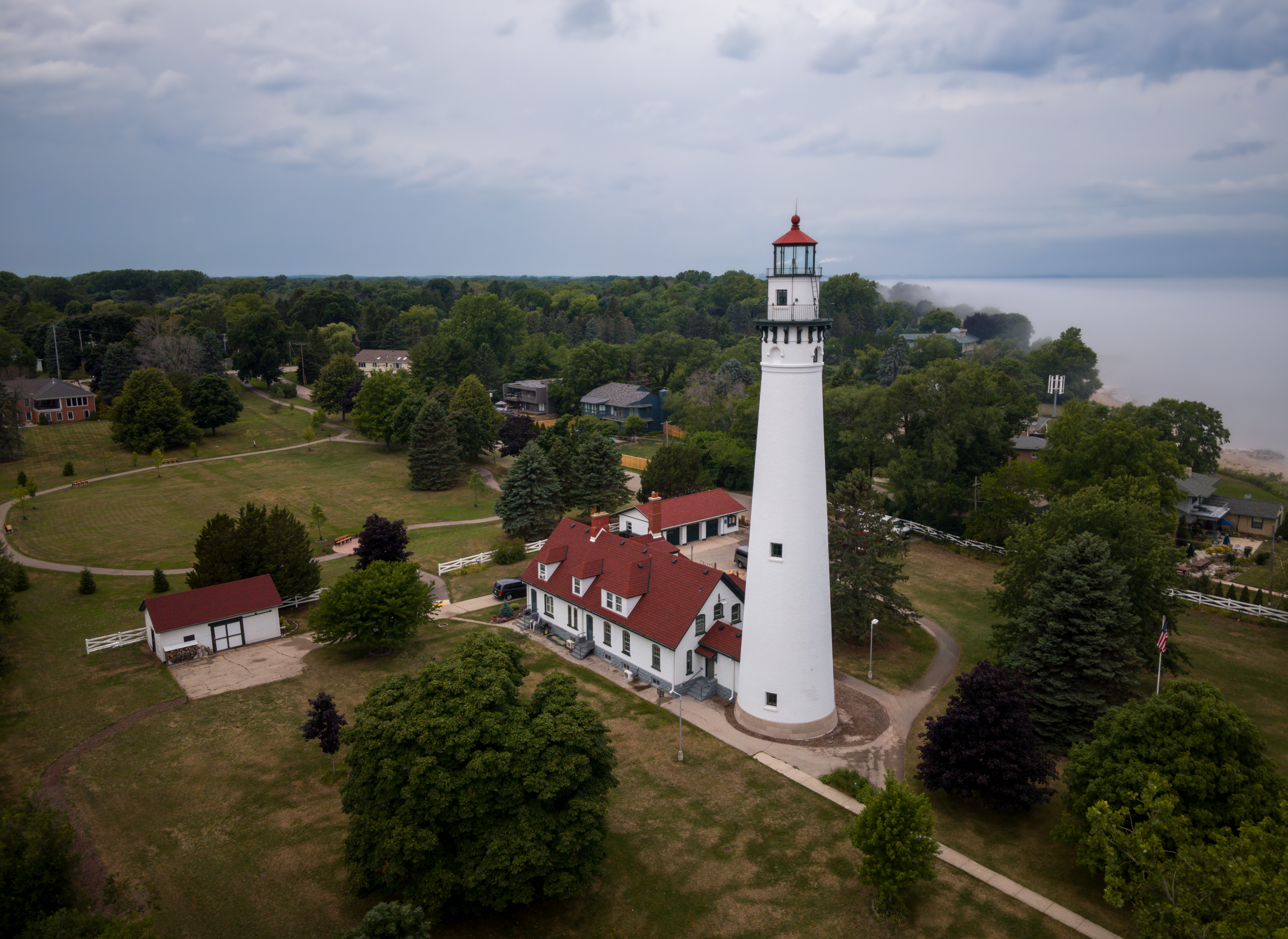
Wind Point Lighthouse on Lake Michigan

Wisconsin is served by eight commercial service airports, in addition to a number of general aviation airports. Milwaukee Mitchell International Airport is the largest airport located in Wisconsin, categorized as a medium-hub primary commercial service facility. Dane County Regional Airport and Appleton International Airport are classified as small-hub primary commercial airports that service the Madison and Fox Cities areas.

Wisconsin is served by multiple intercity bus operators, which provide service to 71 stops and 53 cities. The following carriers provide scheduled bus service: Amtrak Thruway, Badger Bus, Flixbus, Greyhound Lines, Indian Trails, Jefferson Lines, Lamers Bus Lines, Megabus, Van Galder Bus Company, and Wisconsin Coach Lines.

Wisconsin is served by eight Interstate Highways, consisting of five primary routes and three auxiliary routes. The first part of this system was constructed in 1956, and its most recent expansion took place in 2015, with the addition of I-41 to the system. Wisconsin's longest Interstate Highway is I-94. There are also fourteen United States Numbered Highways in the state of Wisconsin, which were designated beginning in 1926 and ending in the mid-1930s. There are also several business routes, usually maintained by local governments. The Wisconsin Department of Transportation maintains 158 state trunk highways, ranging from two-lane rural roads to limited-access freeways. These highways are paid for by the state's Transportation Fund, which is considered unique among state highway funds because it is kept entirely separate from the general fund, therefore, revenues received from transportation services are required to be used on transportation. The majority of state highway funding comes from gas taxes and vehicle registration fees.

Amtrak provides daily passenger rail service between Milwaukee and Chicago through the Hiawatha. The Borealis provides daily service to Chicago and Saint Paul, Minnesota, and is supplemental to the long-distance cross-country Empire Builder, both with stops in several cities across Wisconsin. Commuter rail provider Metra's Union Pacific North (UP-N) line has its northern terminus in Kenosha, the only Metra line and station in the state of Wisconsin. The Hop, a modern streetcar system in Milwaukee, began service in 2018. The 2.1 mile (3.4 km) initial line runs from Milwaukee Intermodal Station to Burns Commons.

== State symbols ==
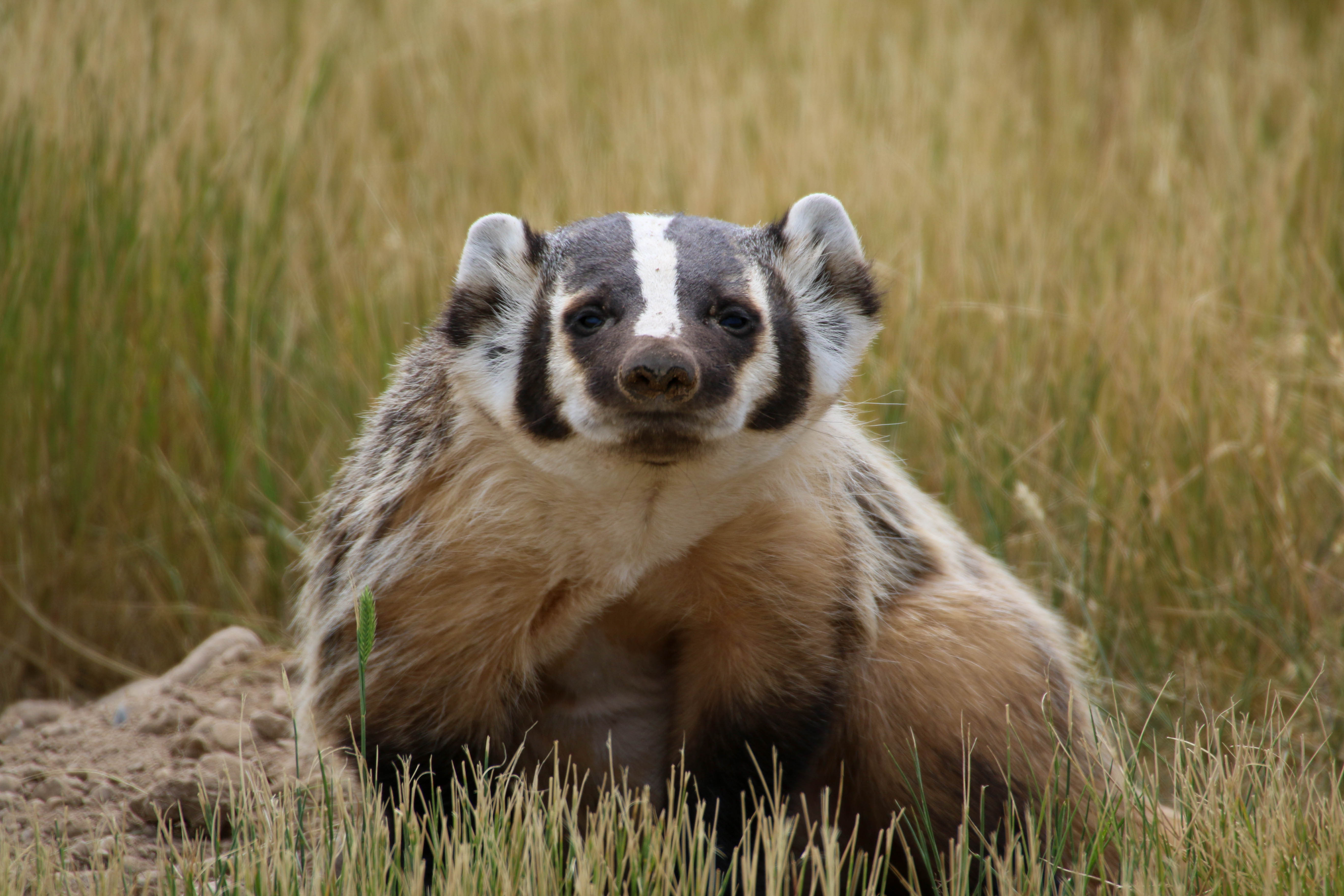
The American badger is the state animal of Wisconsin.

Wisconsin is traditionally known as the "Badger State" due to its early history in lead mining. Many of the state's first settlers were drawn by the prospect of mining in southwest Wisconsin, a mineral-rich region which had been contested between Native Americans and the U.S. Some of the miners lived burrowed within hillsides either due to lack of time or finances to build above-ground structures during the winter. Similar to the American badger using its claws to dig holes, the miners were nicknamed "badgers". The University of Wisconsin–Madison adopted the badger as a mascot in 1889 after the nickname; the badger was named Wisconsin's state animal in 1957.

- State nicknames: Badger State, America's Dairyland
- State motto: Forward
- State song: "On, Wisconsin!"
- State bird: American robin
- State animal: American badger
- State domestic animal: dairy cow
- State wildlife animal: white-tailed deer
- State fish: muskellunge
- State insect: Western honey bee
- State dog: American Water Spaniel
- State dairy product: cheese
- State fruit: cranberry
- State grain: corn
- State pastry: kringle
- State beverage: milk
- State cocktail: brandy old fashioned
- State dance: polka
- State fossil: trilobite
- State flower: wood violet
- State tree: sugar maple
- State rock: granite
- State mineral: galena
- State quarter: US coin issued in 2004 featuring a banner with the state motto, the head of a cow, a round of cheese, and an ear of corn.
- State soil: Antigo

== See also ==
- Index of Wisconsin-related articles
- List of people from Wisconsin
- Outline of Wisconsin
- Impeachment in Wisconsin

== Sources ==
- Martin, Lawrence (1916). The Physical Geography of Wisconsin. University of Wisconsin Press. ISBN 978-0-299-03475-7.

Preceded by Iowa	List of U.S. states by date of statehood Admitted on May 29, 1848 (30th)	Succeeded by California
