= List of regions of the United States =

This is a list of some of the ways regions are defined in the United States. Many regions are defined in law or regulations by the federal government; others by shared culture and history, and others by economic factors.

== Interstate regions ==
=== Census Bureau-designated regions and divisions ===
U.S. Census Bureau regions and divisions

Since 1950, the United States Census Bureau defines four statistical regions, with nine divisions. The Census Bureau region definition is "widely used [...] for data collection and analysis", and is the most commonly used classification system.

U.S. Census Bureau Regional Divisions
Region	Division	States
Northeast	New England	Connecticut; Maine; Massachusetts; New Hampshire; Rhode Island; Vermont
Northeast	Mid-Atlantic	New Jersey; New York; Pennsylvania
Midwest	East North Central	Illinois; Indiana; Michigan; Ohio; Wisconsin
Midwest	West North Central	Iowa; Kansas; Minnesota; Missouri; Nebraska; North Dakota; South Dakota
South	South Atlantic	Delaware; District of Columbia; Florida; Georgia; Maryland; North Carolina; South Carolina; Virginia; West Virginia
South	East South Central	Alabama; Kentucky; Mississippi; Tennessee
South	West South Central	Arkansas; Louisiana; Oklahoma; Texas
West	Mountain	Arizona; Colorado; Idaho; Montana; Nevada; New Mexico; Utah; Wyoming
West	Pacific	Alaska; California; Hawaii; Oregon; Washington

Puerto Rico and other US territories are not part of any census region or census division.

=== Federal Reserve Banks ===
Federal Reserve System districts

The Federal Reserve Act of 1913 divided the country into twelve districts with a central Federal Reserve Bank in each district. These twelve Federal Reserve Banks together form a major part of the Federal Reserve System, the central banking system of the United States. Missouri is the only U.S. state to have two Federal Reserve locations within its borders, but several other states are also divided between more than one district.

1. Boston
2. New York
3. Philadelphia
4. Cleveland
5. Richmond
6. Atlanta
7. Chicago
8. St. Louis
9. Minneapolis
10. Kansas City
11. Dallas
12. San Francisco

=== Time zones ===
U.S. time zones (some U.S. time zones are not on this map)

- UTC−12:00 (Baker Island, Howland Island)
- Samoa Time Zone (American Samoa, Jarvis Island, Kingman Reef, Midway Atoll, Palmyra Atoll)
- Hawaii–Aleutian Time Zone (Hawaii, Aleutian Islands (Alaska), Johnston Atoll)
- Alaska Time Zone (Alaska, excluding Aleutian Islands)
- Pacific Time Zone
- Arizona Time Zone (excluding the Navajo Nation)
- Mountain Time Zone (excluding most parts of Arizona)
- Central Time Zone
- Eastern Time Zone
- Atlantic Time Zone (Puerto Rico, U.S. Virgin Islands)
- Chamorro Time Zone (Guam, Northern Mariana Islands)
- Wake Island Time Zone (Wake Island)

=== Courts of Appeals circuits ===
U.S. Courts of Appeals circuits

- First Circuit
- Second Circuit
- Third Circuit
- Fourth Circuit
- Fifth Circuit
- Sixth Circuit
- Seventh Circuit
- Eighth Circuit
- Ninth Circuit
- Tenth Circuit
- Eleventh Circuit
- D.C. Circuit

The Federal Circuit is not a regional circuit. Its jurisdiction is nationwide but based on the subject matter.

=== Agency administrative regions ===
In 1969, the Office of Management and Budget published a list of ten "Standard Federal Regions", to which federal agencies could be restructured as a means of standardizing government administration nationwide. Despite a finding in 1977 that this restructuring did not reduce administrative costs as initially expected, and the complete rescinding of the standard region system in 1995, several agencies continue to follow the system, including the Environmental Protection Agency and the Department of Housing and Urban Development.

==== Regions and office locations ====
Regions of the U.S. Environmental Protection Agency

===== Region I =====
Office location: Boston

States: Connecticut, Maine, Massachusetts, New Hampshire, Rhode Island, and Vermont

===== Region II =====
Office location: New York City

States: New York, New Jersey, Puerto Rico, and the U.S. Virgin Islands

===== Region III =====
Office location: Philadelphia

States: Delaware, Maryland, Pennsylvania, Virginia, Washington, D.C., and West Virginia

===== Region IV =====
Office location: Atlanta

States: Alabama, Florida, Georgia, Kentucky, Mississippi, North Carolina, South Carolina, and Tennessee

===== Region V =====
Office location: Chicago

States: Illinois, Indiana, Minnesota, Michigan, Ohio, and Wisconsin

===== Region VI =====
Office location: Dallas

States: Arkansas, Louisiana, New Mexico, Oklahoma, and Texas

===== Region VII =====
Office location: Kansas City

States: Iowa, Kansas, Missouri, and Nebraska

===== Region VIII =====
Office location: Denver

States: Colorado, Montana, North Dakota, South Dakota, Utah, and Wyoming

===== Region IX =====
Office location: San Francisco

States: Arizona, California, Hawaii, Nevada, Guam, Northern Mariana Islands, American Samoa, U.S. Minor Outlying Islands in the Pacific, the Freely Associated States of the Federated States of Micronesia, and the Republic of Palau.

===== Region X =====
Office location: Seattle

States: Alaska, Idaho, Oregon, and Washington

=== Bureau of Economic Analysis regions ===
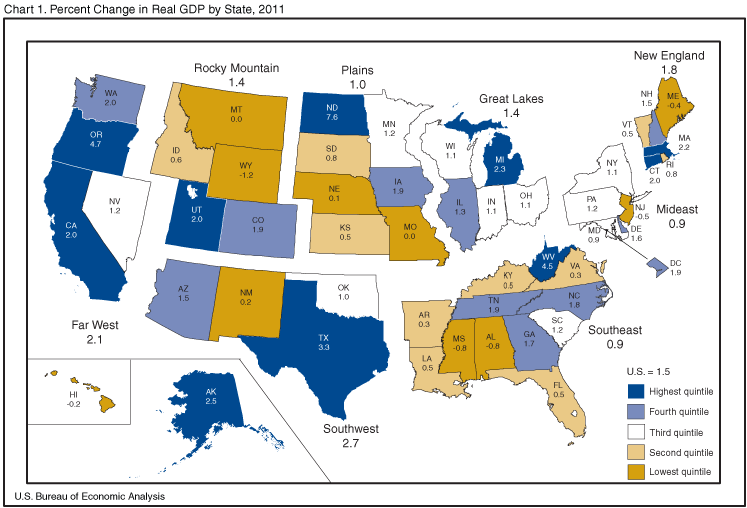
Bureau of Economic Analysis regions

The Bureau of Economic Analysis defines regions for comparison of economic data.

- New England: Connecticut, Maine, Massachusetts, New Hampshire, Rhode Island, and Vermont
- Mideast: Delaware, Maryland, New Jersey, New York, Pennsylvania, and Washington, D.C.
- Great Lakes: Illinois, Indiana, Michigan, Ohio, and Wisconsin
- Plains: Iowa, Kansas, Minnesota, Missouri, Nebraska, North Dakota, and South Dakota
- Southeast: Alabama, Arkansas, Florida, Georgia, Kentucky, Louisiana, Mississippi, North Carolina, South Carolina, Tennessee, Virginia, and West Virginia
- Southwest: Arizona, New Mexico, Oklahoma, and Texas
- Rocky Mountain: Colorado, Idaho, Montana, Utah, and Wyoming
- Far West: Alaska, California, Hawaii, Nevada, Oregon, and Washington

== Unofficial regions ==
=== Multi-state regions ===
- American Frontier
- Appalachia
- Ark-La-Tex
- Auto Alley
- Backcountry
- Black Dirt Region
- Border states:
  - Civil War border states
  - International border states
- The Californias
- Calumet Region
- The Carolinas
- Cascadia
- Central United States
- Coastal states
- Colorado Plateau
- Columbia Basin
- Contiguous United States
- The Dakotas
- Deep South
- Deseret
- Delmarva Peninsula
- Dixie
- Dixie Alley
- Driftless Area
- East Coast
- Eastern United States
- Flyover country
- Four Corners
- Great American Desert
- Great Appalachian Valley
- Great Basin
- Great Lakes Region
- Gulf Coast
- Heartland
- High Plains
- Interior Highlands
  - Ouachita Mountains
  - Ozarks
- Interior Plains
  - Great Plains
    - Black Hills
    - Cross Timbers
    - Osage Plains
- Intermountain States
- Kentuckiana
- Llano Estacado
- Lower 48
- Michiana
- Mid-Atlantic states
- Middle America
- Mid-South states
- Midwestern United States
- Mississippi Delta
- Mojave Desert
- Mormon Corridor
- New England
  - Northern New England
  - Southern New England
- Nickajack
- North Woods
- Northeastern United States
- Northern United States
- Northwestern United States
- Ohio Valley
- Old South
- Old Southwest
- Pacific Northwest
  - Inland Northwest
- Palouse
- Piedmont
- Piney Woods
- Rocky Mountains
  - Southern Rocky Mountains
- Sierra Nevada
- Siouxland
- Southeastern United States
- Southern United States
- Southwestern United States
- Tidewater
- Tornado Alley
- Trans-Appalachia
- Trans-Mississippi
- Twin Tiers
- Upland South
- Upper Midwest
- Virginias
- Waxhaws
- West Coast
- Western United States

=== Multi-territory regions ===
- Mariana Islands (Guam and the Northern Mariana Islands)
- Samoan Islands (American Samoa, except Swains Island) (Note: This region also includes the Independent State of Samoa, which is not a part of the United States.)
- Virgin Islands (the Spanish Virgin Islands and the U.S. Virgin Islands) (Note: This region also includes the British Virgin Islands, which is not a part of the United States.)

=== The Belts ===
- Bible Belt
- Black Belt
- Borscht Belt
- Coal Belt
- Corn Belt
- Cotton Belt
- Fruit Belt
- Great bison belt
- Pine Belt
- Pretzel Belt
- Rice Belt
- Rust Belt
- Salt Belt
- Snowbelt
- Stroke Belt
- Sun Belt
- Unchurched Belt

=== Interstate megalopolises ===
- Arizona Sun Corridor
- California
- Cascadia
- Great Lakes
- Gulf Coast
- Northeast
- Piedmont Atlantic
- Southern Rocky Mountain Front

=== Interstate metropolitan areas ===
- Augusta metropolitan area (parts of Georgia and South Carolina)
- Central Savannah River Area (part of Georgia and South Carolina)
- Baltimore–Washington metropolitan area (Washington, D.C. and parts of Maryland, Virginia, West Virginia, and Pennsylvania)
  - Washington metropolitan area (District of Columbia and parts of Maryland, Virginia, and West Virginia)
- Greater Boston (parts of Massachusetts, Rhode Island, and New Hampshire)
- Charlotte metropolitan area (parts of North Carolina and South Carolina)
- Chattanooga Metropolitan Area
- Chicago metropolitan area (parts of Illinois, Indiana, and Wisconsin)
- Cincinnati metropolitan area (parts of Ohio, Indiana, and Kentucky)
- Columbus-Auburn-Opelika (GA-AL) Combined Statistical Area (parts of Georgia and Alabama)
- Evansville, IN–KY Metropolitan Statistical Area (parts of Indiana and Kentucky)
- Fargo–Moorhead (parts of North Dakota and Minnesota)
- Fort Smith metropolitan area (parts of Arkansas and Oklahoma)
- Front Range Urban Corridor (parts of Colorado and Wyoming)
- Greater Grand Forks (part of Minnesota and North Dakota)
- Hartford-Springfield (parts of Connecticut and Massachusetts)
- Kansas City metropolitan area (parts of Missouri and Kansas)
- Louisville metropolitan area (Kentuckiana) (parts of Kentucky and Indiana)
- Memphis metropolitan area (parts of Tennessee, Arkansas, and Mississippi)
- Michiana (parts of Michigan and Indiana)
  - South Bend-Mishawaka metropolitan area (parts of Indiana and Michigan)
- Minneapolis–Saint Paul (the Twin Cities) (parts of Minnesota and Wisconsin)
- New York metropolitan area (parts of New York, New Jersey, Connecticut, and Pennsylvania)
- Omaha–Council Bluffs metropolitan area (parts of Nebraska and Iowa)
- Philadelphia metropolitan area (parts of Pennsylvania, New Jersey, Delaware, and Maryland)
- Portland metropolitan area (parts of Oregon and Washington)
- Providence metropolitan area (parts of Rhode Island and Massachusetts)
- Quad Cities (parts of Iowa and Illinois)
- Sioux City metropolitan area (parts of Iowa, Nebraska, and South Dakota)
- Sioux Falls metropolitan area (parts of South Dakota and Minnesota)
- Greater St. Louis (parts of Missouri and Illinois)
- Texarkana metropolitan area (parts of Texas and Arkansas)
- Tri-Cities (parts of Tennessee and Virginia)
- Twin Ports (Duluth, Minnesota and Superior, Wisconsin)
- Hampton Roads region (parts of Virginia and North Carolina)
- Youngstown–Warren–Boardman metropolitan statistical area (parts of Ohio and Pennsylvania)

== Intrastate and intraterritory regions ==
=== Alabama ===
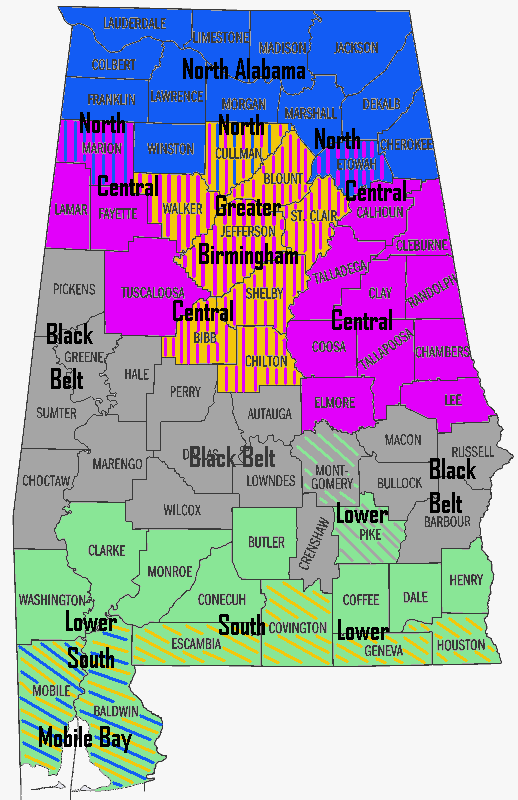
A map of regions of Alabama

Regions of Alabama include:

- Alabama Gulf Coast
- Canebrake
- Greater Birmingham
- Black Belt
- Central Alabama
- Lower Alabama
- Mobile Bay
- North Alabama
- Northeast Alabama
- Northwest Alabama
- South Alabama

=== Alaska ===
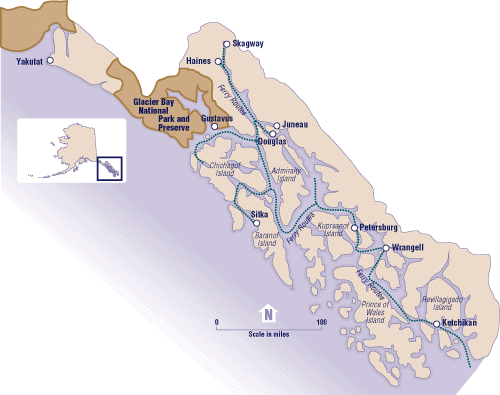
Southeast Alaska, also known as the Alaska Panhandle

Regions of Alaska include:

- Alaska Interior
- Alaska North Slope
- Alaska Panhandle
- Aleutian Islands
- Arctic Alaska
- Gold Belt
- The Bush
- Kenai Peninsula
- Matanuska-Susitna Valley
- Seward Peninsula
- Southcentral Alaska
- Southwest Alaska
- Tanana Valley
- Yukon-Kuskokwim Delta

=== American Samoa ===
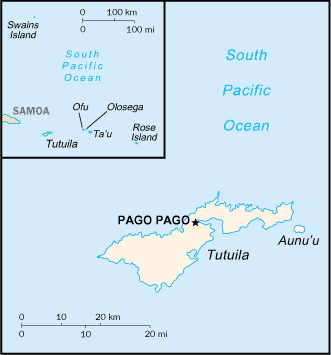
American Samoa

Regions of American Samoa include:

- Manu'a Islands
  - Ofu-Olosega
  - Ta'ū
- Rose Atoll
- Swains Island (Note: Claimed by Tokelau.)
- Tutuila and Aunu'u

=== Arizona ===
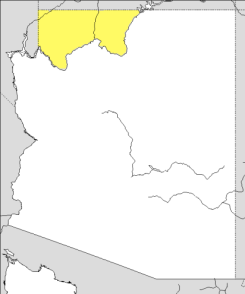
The Arizona Strip

Regions of Arizona include:

- Arizona Strip
- Dinetah
- Grand Canyon
- North Central Arizona
- Northeast Arizona
- Northern Arizona
- Phoenix metropolitan area
- Southern Arizona

=== Arkansas ===
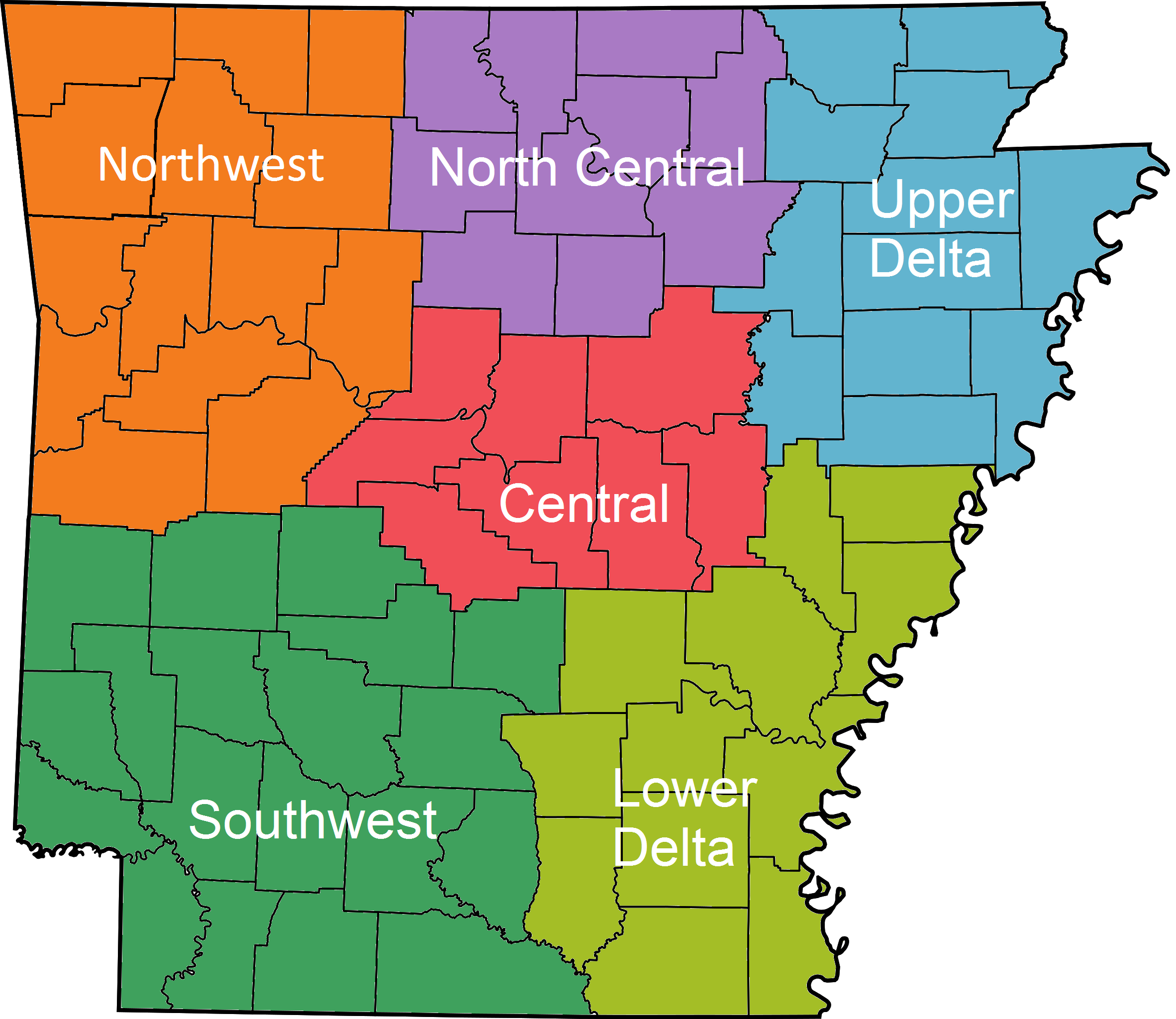
Regions of Arkansas

Regions of Arkansas include:

- Arkansas Delta
- Arkansas River Valley
- Arkansas Timberlands
- Central Arkansas
- Crowley's Ridge
- Northwest Arkansas
- Ozarks
- South Arkansas

=== Colorado ===
An enlargeable map of the Front Range Urban Corridor of Colorado and Wyoming

Regions of Colorado include:

- Central Colorado (part of Southern Rocky Mountains)
- Colorado Eastern Plains (part of High Plains)
- Colorado Mineral Belt (part of Southern Rocky Mountains)
- Colorado Piedmont (parts of the Front Range Urban Corridor and Colorado High Plains)
- Colorado Plateau (multi-state region)
- Colorado Western Slope (parts of Southern Rocky Mountains and Colorado Plateau)
- Denver Metropolitan Area (part of Front Range Urban Corridor)
- Four Corners Region (multi-state region of Colorado Plateau)
- Front Range Urban Corridor (multi-state region)
- High Plains (multi-state region of Great Plains)
- Mesa Verde
- North Central Colorado Urban Area (part of Front Range Urban Corridor)
- Northwestern Colorado (part of Southern Rocky Mountains)
- San Luis Valley
- South-Central Colorado
- South Central Colorado Urban Area (part of Front Range Urban Corridor)
- Southern Rocky Mountains (multi-state region of Rocky Mountains)
- Southwestern Colorado (parts of Southern Rocky Mountains and Colorado Plateau)

=== Connecticut ===
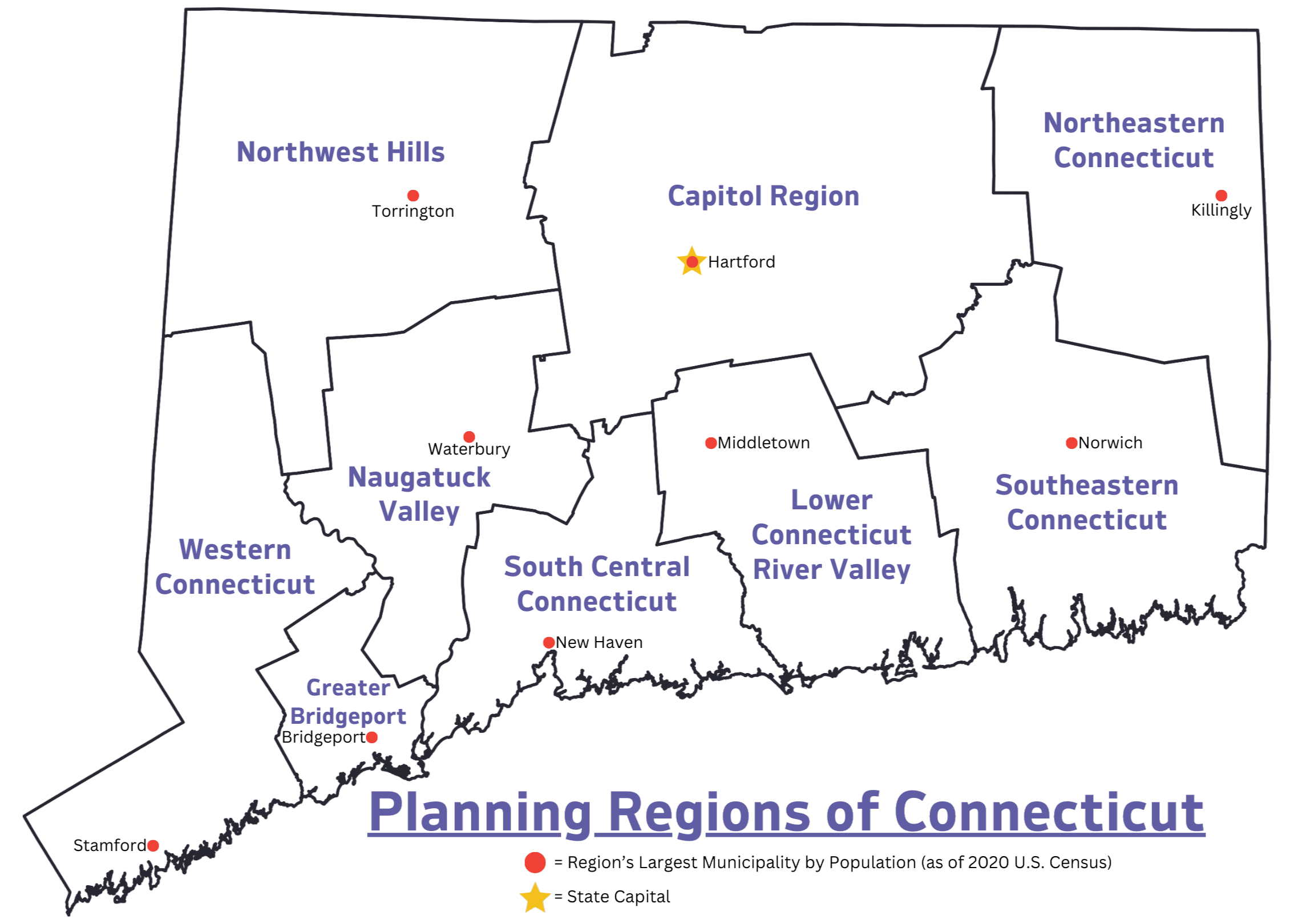
Map highlighting the nine regions of Connecticut

Connecticut has nine official planning regions, which operate as councils of governments and are recognized as county equivalents by the U.S. Census Bureau. The nine regions are:

- Capitol Region
- Greater Bridgeport
- Lower Connecticut River Valley
- Naugatuck Valley
- Northeastern Connecticut
- Northwest Hills
- South Central Connecticut
- Southeastern Connecticut
- Western Connecticut

Some of Connecticut's informal regions include:

- Coastal Connecticut
- Connecticut panhandle/Gold Coast
- Farmington Valley
- Housatonic Valley
- Litchfield Hills
- Quiet Corner

=== Delaware ===
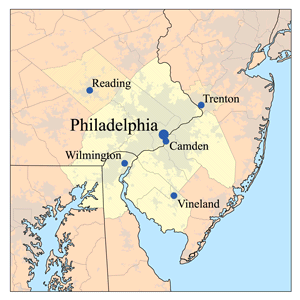
The Delaware Valley, also known as the Philadelphia metropolitan area

Regions of Delaware include:

- "Upstate" or "Up North":
  - Delaware Valley, also known as "Above the Canal" (referring to the Chesapeake and Delaware Canal)

"Slower Lower":

  - Cape Region
  - Central Kent
  - Delaware coast

=== Florida ===
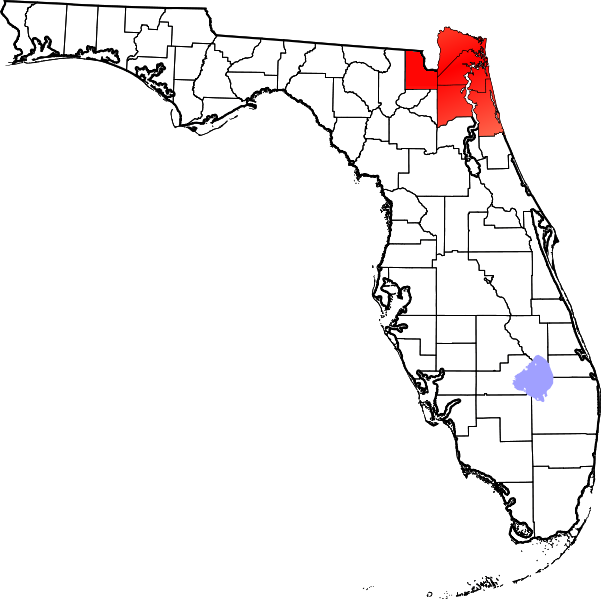
The First Coast

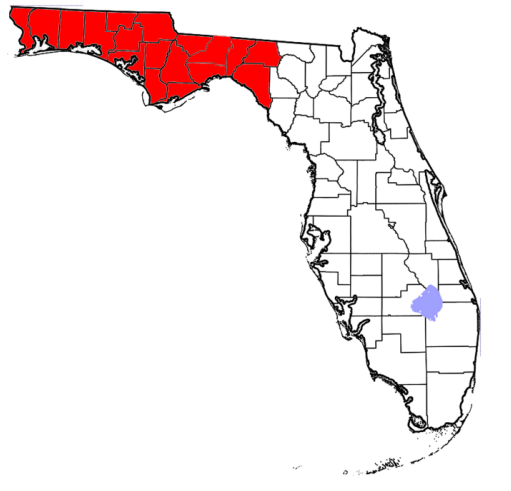
The Florida Panhandle

Directional regions of Florida include:

- Central Florida
- East Florida
- North Central Florida
- North Florida
- Northwest Florida
- Northeast Florida
- South Florida
- Southwest Florida
- West Florida

Local vernacular regions of Florida include:

- Big Bend
- Emerald Coast
- First Coast
- Florida Heartland
- Florida Keys
- Florida Panhandle
- Forgotten Coast
- Glades
- Gold Coast
- Halifax area (also Surf Coast and Fun Coast)
- Red Hills
- Nature Coast
- Space Coast
- Suncoast
- Tampa Bay Area
- Treasure Coast

=== Georgia ===
Regions of Georgia include:

- Atlanta metropolitan area
- Central Georgia
- Central Savannah River Area
- Colonial Coast
- Gold Belt
- Golden Isles of Georgia
- North Georgia
- North Georgia mountains (Northeast Georgia)
- Southeast Georgia
- Wiregrass Region

==== Physiographic regions ====
Physiographic regions of Georgia include:

- Appalachian Plateau
- Blue Ridge Mountains
- Coastal Plain
- Piedmont
- Ridge-and-Valley Appalachians

=== Guam ===
Regions of Guam include:

- Cocos Island
- Guam (main island)
  - Ritidian Point
  - Tumon

=== Hawaii ===
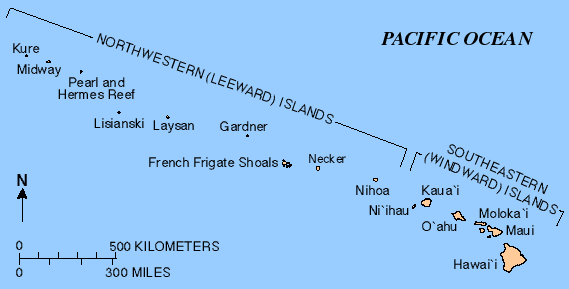
Hawaiian archipelago

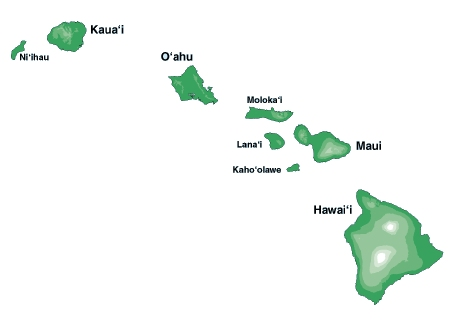
Hawaiian Islands

Regions of Hawaii include:

- Hawaiʻi Island (Big Island)
  - Hāmākua Coast
  - Kaʻū Desert
  - Kohala Coast
  - Kona Coast
  - Mauna Kea
  - Puna District
  - Waiākea-Uka
- Kahoʻolawe
- Kauaʻi
  - Nā Pali Coast
- Kaʻula
- Lānaʻi
- Maui
  - Haleakalā
  - Molokini
  - West Maui Mountains
    - ʻĪao Valley
- Molokaʻi
  - Kalaupapa Peninsula
- Niʻihau
  - Lehua
- Northwestern Hawaiian Islands (Note: Midway Atoll, part of the Northwest Hawaiian Islands, is not politically part of Hawaii; it is one of the United States Minor Outlying Islands.)
  - Nīhoa (Moku Manu)
  - Necker Island (Mokumanamana)
  - French Frigate Shoals (Kānemiloha)
  - Gardner Pinnacles (Pūhāhonu)
  - Maro Reef (Nalukākala)
  - Laysan (Kauō)
  - Lisianski (Papaāpoho)
  - Pearl and Hermes (Holoikauaua)
  - Kure Atoll (Mokupāpapa)
- Oʻahu
  - Kaʻena Point
  - Makapuʻu
  - North Shore
  - Waikīkī

=== Idaho ===
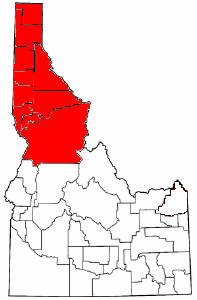
The Idaho Panhandle

Regions of Idaho include:

- Central Idaho
- Eastern Idaho
- Idaho panhandle
- Magic Valley
- North Central Idaho
- Palouse Hills
- Southern Idaho
- Southwestern Idaho
- Treasure Valley

=== Illinois ===
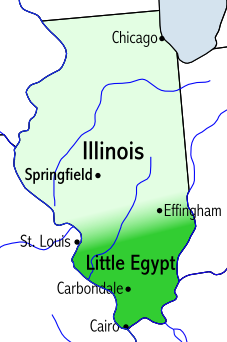
Southern Illinois, also known as "Little Egypt"

Regions of Illinois include:

- Central Illinois
- Champaign–Urbana metropolitan area
- Chicago metropolitan area
  - Community areas in Chicago
  - Fox Valley
  - The Collar Counties
  - North Shore
- Driftless Area
- Forgottonia
- Metro-East
  - American Bottom
  - River Bend
- Metro Lakeland
- Military Tract of 1812
- Northern Illinois
- Northwestern Illinois
- Peoria, Illinois metropolitan area
- Quad Cities
- Rock River Valley
- Shawnee Hills
- Southern Illinois (sometimes, Little Egypt)
- Tri-State Area
- Wabash Valley

=== Indiana ===
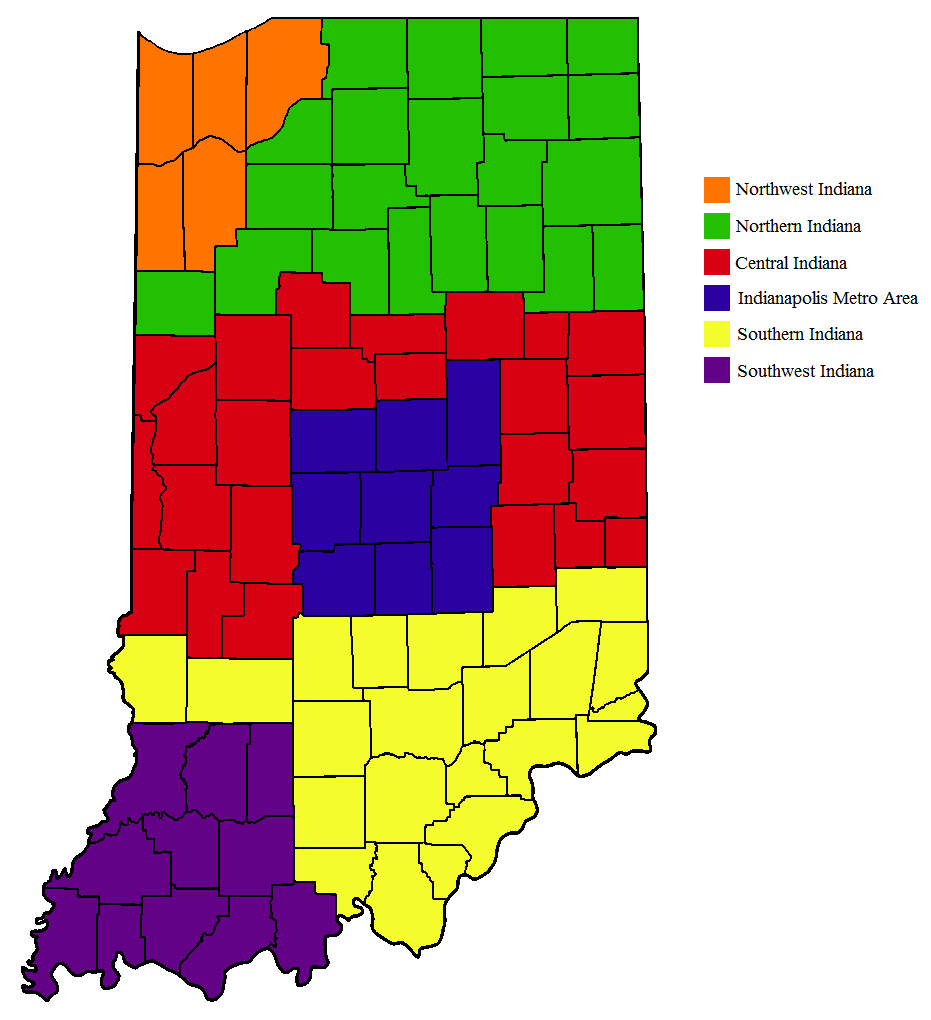
Regions of Indiana

Regions of Indiana include:

- East Central Indiana
- Indianapolis metropolitan area
- Michiana
- Northern Indiana
- Northwest Indiana
- Southern Indiana
- Southwestern Indiana
- Wabash Valley

=== Iowa ===
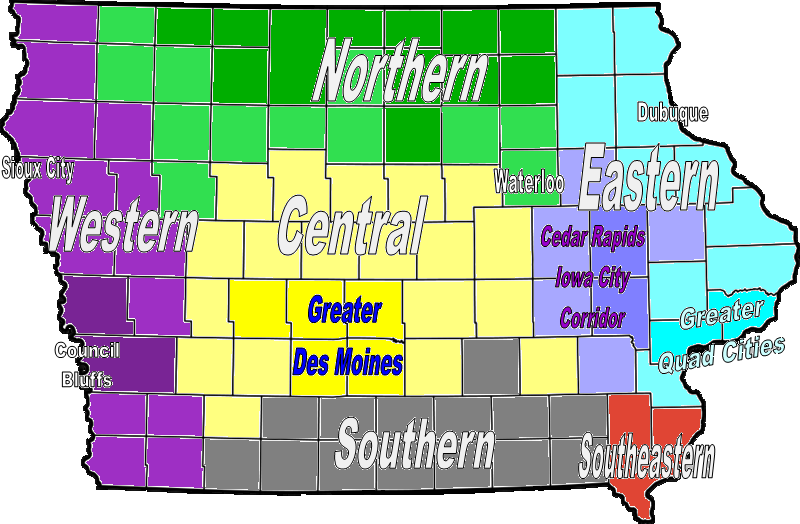
Regions of Iowa

Regions of Iowa include:

- Coteau des Prairies
- Des Moines metropolitan area
- Dissected Till Plains
- Driftless Area
- Great River Road
- Honey Lands
- Iowa Great Lakes
- Loess Hills
- Omaha–Council Bluffs metropolitan area
- Quad Cities
- Siouxland

=== Kansas ===
Regions of Kansas include:

- East-Central Kansas
- Flint Hills
- High Plains
- Kansas City Metropolitan Area
- Missouri Rhineland
- North Central Kansas
- Osage Plains
- Ozarks
- Red Hills
- Santa Fe Trail
- Smoky Hills
- Southeast Kansas

=== Kentucky ===
Regions of Kentucky include:

- Bluegrass
- Cumberland Plateau or Eastern Coal Field
- Golden Triangle
- Jackson Purchase
- Pennyroyal Plateau
- Western Coal Field

=== Louisiana ===
Regions of Louisiana

Regions of Louisiana include:

- Acadiana

- Cajun Heartland
- River Parishes

- Central Louisiana (Cen-La)
- Florida Parishes
- "French Louisiana" (Acadiana and Greater New Orleans)
- Greater New Orleans
- North Louisiana
- Southwest Louisiana

=== Maine ===
Regions of Maine include:

- Acadia
- Down East
- High Peaks / Maine Highlands
- Hundred-Mile Wilderness
- Kennebec Valley
- Maine Highlands
- Maine Lake Country
- Maine North Woods
- Mid Coast
- Penobscot Bay
- Southern Maine Coast
- Western Maine Mountains

=== Maryland ===
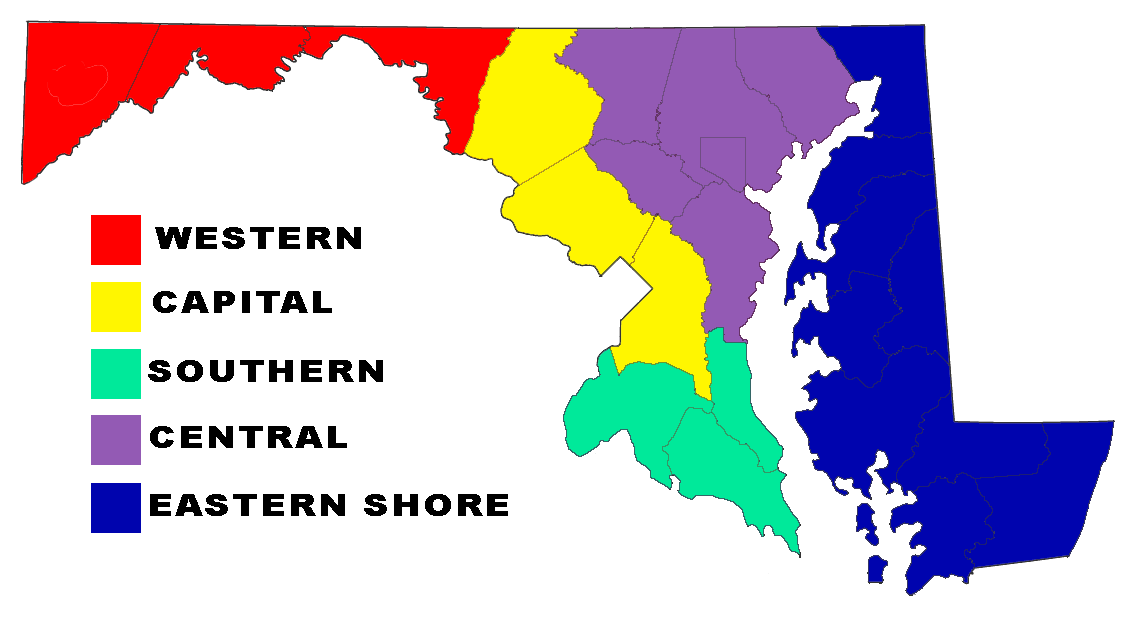
Regions of Maryland

Regions of Maryland include:

- Baltimore–Washington Metropolitan Area
- Capital region
- Chesapeake Bay
- Eastern Shore of Maryland
- Patapsco Valley
- Southern Maryland
- Western Maryland

Regions of Maryland shared with other states include:

- Allegheny Mountains
- Atlantic coastal plain
- Blue Ridge Mountains
- Cumberland Valley
- Delaware Valley
- Delmarva Peninsula consists of Maryland's and Virginia's Eastern Shore and all of Delaware
- Piedmont (United States)
- Ridge-and-Valley Appalachians

=== Massachusetts ===
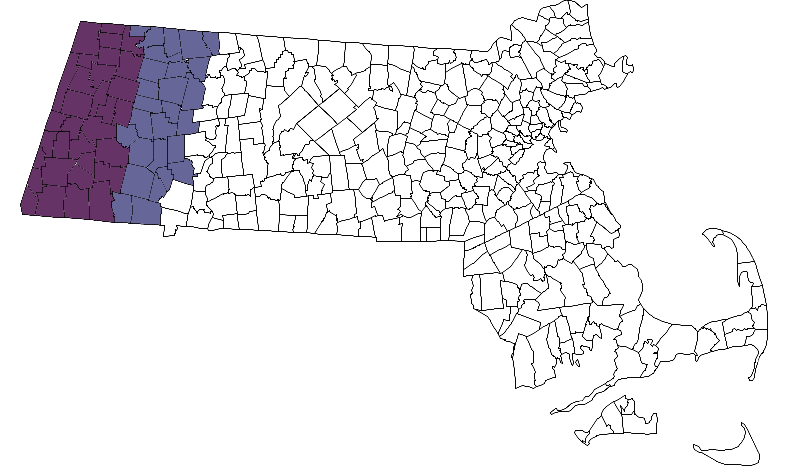
The Berkshires region of Massachusetts

Regions of Massachusetts include:

- Central Massachusetts
  - MetroWest
  - Montachusett-North County
  - South County
  - Blackstone River Valley
- Northeastern Massachusetts
  - North Shore
    - Merrimack Valley
    - Cape Ann
  - Greater Boston
- Southeastern Massachusetts
  - Cape Cod and Islands
    - Cape Cod
    - Martha's Vineyard
    - Nantucket
  - South Coast
  - South Shore
- Western Massachusetts
  - The Berkshires (shown in map)
  - Housatonic Valley
  - Pioneer Valley
  - Quabbin-Swift River Valley

=== Michigan ===
Regions of Michigan

Regions of Michigan include:

==== Lower Peninsula ====
- Northern Michigan
  - Traverse Bay Area
  - Straits Area
- Central/Mid-Michigan
  - The Thumb
  - Bluewater Area
  - Tri-Cities
  - Capital Region
- West Michigan
  - Southwest Michigan
  - Michiana
  - Grand Rapids area
- Southeast Michigan
  - Metro Detroit

==== Upper Peninsula ====
- Western Upper Peninsula
  - Copper Country
    - Copper Island
- Central Upper Peninsula
  - US 41 Corridor
- Eastern Upper Peninsula
  - Straits Area
  - Soo Area

=== Minnesota ===
Regions of Minnesota

Regions of Minnesota include:

- Arrowhead Region
- Boundary Waters
- Buffalo Ridge
- Central Minnesota
- Coulee Region
- Iron Range
- Minnesota River Valley
- North Shore
- Northwest Angle
- Pipestone Region
- Red River Valley
- Southeast Minnesota
- Twin Cities Metro

=== Mississippi ===
Regions of Mississippi include:

- Mississippi Alluvial Plain
- Mississippi Delta
- Mississippi Gulf Coast
- Natchez Trace
- Yazoo lands

=== Missouri ===
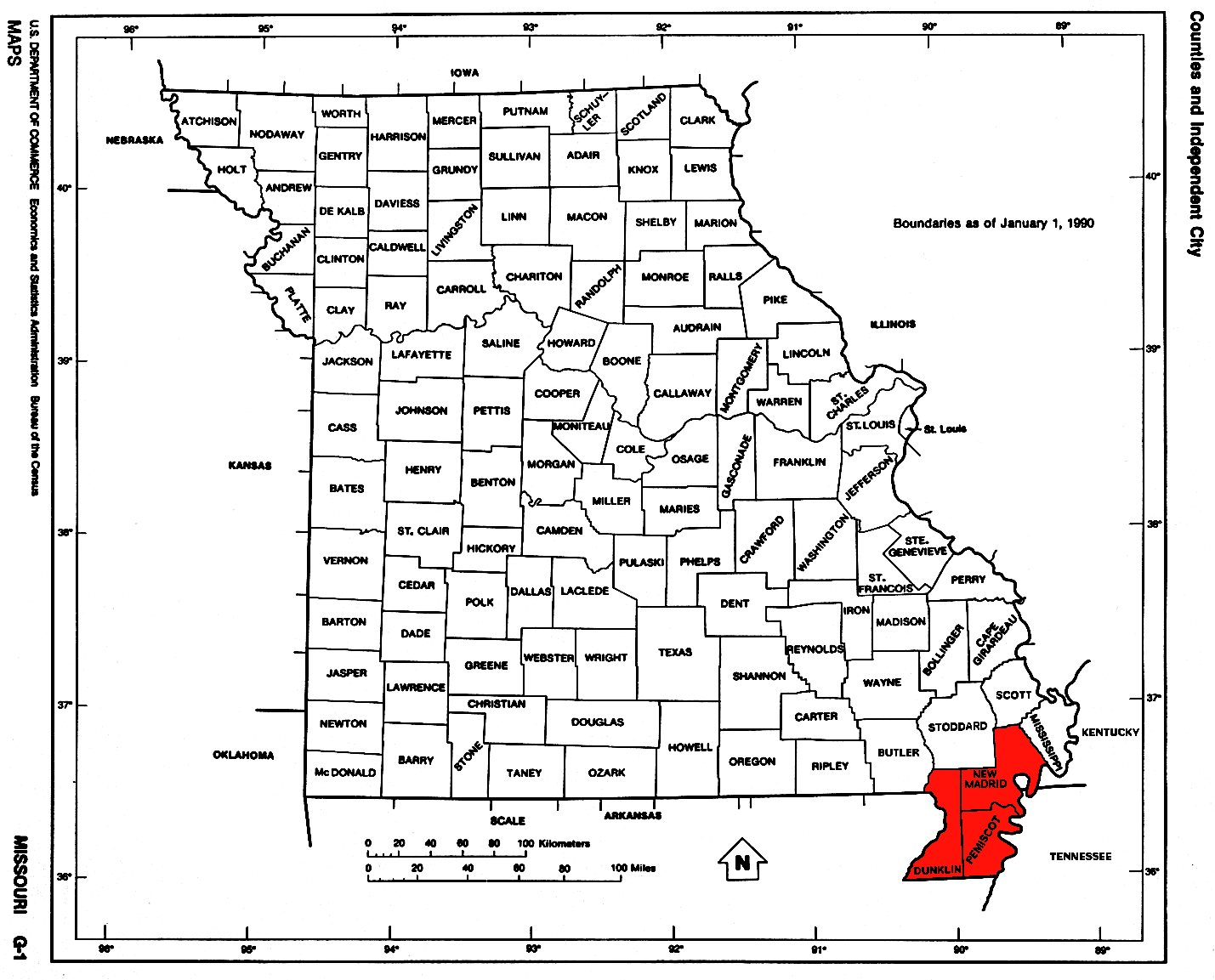
The Missouri Bootheel

Regions of Missouri include:

- Boonslick
- Bootheel
- Dissected Till Plains
- Kansas City Metropolitan Area
- Lead Belt
- Little Dixie
- Missouri Rhineland
- Ozarks
- Platte Purchase
- St. Louis Metropolitan Area

=== Montana ===
Regions of Montana include:

- Big Horn Mountains
- Eastern Montana
- Glacier Country
- Glacier National Park
- Regional designations of Montana
- The Flathead
- Two Medicine
- Western Montana
- Yellowstone National Park

=== Nebraska ===
The Nebraska Panhandle

Regions of Nebraska include:

- Nebraska Panhandle
- Pine Ridge
- Rainwater Basin
- Sand Hills
- Wildcat Hills

=== Nevada ===
Regions of Nevada include:

- Black Rock Desert
- Lake Tahoe
- Las Vegas Valley
- Mojave Desert
- Pahranagat Valley
- Sierra Nevada

=== New Hampshire ===
Regions of New Hampshire include:

- Connecticut River Valley
- Dartmouth-Lake Sunapee Region (overlaps with Connecticut River Valley)
- Great North Woods Region
- Lakes Region
- Merrimack Valley
  - Golden Triangle
- Monadnock Region (overlaps with Connecticut River Valley)
- Seacoast Region
- White Mountains

=== New Jersey ===
Regions of New Jersey include:

- Central Jersey
  - Bayshore
  - Jersey Shore
  - Shore Region
- North Jersey
  - Skylands
    - Amwell Valley
    - Black Dirt Region (shared with New York)
    - Great Valley
    - Hunterdon Plateau
    - Ridge-and-Valley Appalachians
    - Highlands
    - Somerset Hills
    - The Sourlands
  - Gateway
    - Chemical Coast/Soundshore
    - Hudson Waterfront
      - North Hudson
    - Meadowlands
    - Pascack Valley
    - Raritan Bayshore
    - West Hudson
- South Jersey
  - Shore Region
  - New Jersey Pine Barrens
  - Delaware Valley
  - Southern Shore
    - Cape May

=== New Mexico ===
Regions of New Mexico include:

- Central New Mexico
- Eastern New Mexico
- New Mexico Bootheel
- Northern New Mexico

=== New York ===
Regions of New York states as defined by the Empire State Development Corporation Regions of New York

The ten regions of New York, as defined by the Empire State Development Corporation:

- Capital District – counties : Albany, Columbia, Greene, Warren, Washington, Saratoga, Schenectady, Rensselaer
- Central New York – counties: Cortland, Cayuga, Onondaga, Oswego, Madison
- Finger Lakes – counties: Orleans, Genesee, Wyoming, Monroe, Livingston, Wayne, Ontario, Yates, Seneca
- Long Island – counties: Nassau, Suffolk
- Mohawk Valley – counties: Oneida, Herkimer, Fulton, Montgomery, Otsego, Schoharie
- New York City – counties (boroughs): New York (Manhattan), Bronx (The Bronx), Queens (Queens), Kings (Brooklyn), Richmond (Staten Island)
- North Country – counties : St. Lawrence, Lewis, Jefferson, Hamilton, Essex, Clinton, Franklin
- Southern Tier – counties: Steuben, Schuyler, Chemung, Tompkins, Tioga, Chenango, Broome, Delaware
- Western New York – counties: Niagara, Erie, Chautauqua, Cattaraugus, Allegany

Regions of New York state include:

- Downstate New York
  - New York metropolitan area (New York City)
  - Long Island
    - East End
    - The Hamptons
    - North Shore (Gold Coast)
    - South Shore
- Hudson Valley – counties: Sullivan, Ulster, Dutchess, Orange, Putnam, Rockland, Westchester
- Upstate New York
  - Erie Canal Corridor
  - Western New York
    - Holland Purchase
    - Burned-over district
  - Finger Lakes
  - former Leatherstocking Country (now the Central New York Region)
  - Central New York
    - Central New York Military Tract
    - Phelps and Gorham Purchase
    - Syracuse metropolitan area
  - Mohawk Valley
  - Southern Tier
  - Capital District
  - North Country
    - Adirondack Mountains
      - Adirondack Park
    - Ski country
    - Thousand Islands
    - Tug Hill
  - Catskill Mountains
    - Borscht Belt
  - Hudson Valley
    - Shawangunk Ridge
    - Black Dirt Region (shared with New Jersey)

=== North Carolina ===
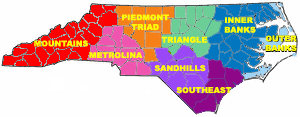
Regions of North Carolina

Regions of North Carolina include:

- Eastern North Carolina
  - Fayetteville Metropolitan Area
  - Inner Banks
    - Albemarle
    - Global TransPark Economic Development Area
    - Tidewater
  - Lower Cape Fear (Wilmington Area)
  - Outer Banks
    - Crystal Coast
      - Bogue Banks
      - Down East
  - Sandhills
- Central North Carolina
  - Piedmont Crescent
    - Metropolitan Charlotte (Metrolina)
      - Lake Norman Area
    - Metropolitan Piedmont Triad
      - Sauratown Mountains
      - Uwharrie Mountains
      - Yadkin Valley
  - The Research Triangle
    - New Hope Valley
- Western North Carolina
  - Foothills Region
    - South Mountains
    - The Unifour (Catawba Valley Area)
  - High Country (Boone Area)
  - Land of the Sky
    - Asheville Metropolitan Area
      - Great Craggy Mountains
    - Blue Ridge Mountains
      - Black Mountains
      - Brushy Mountains
      - Great Balsam Mountains
      - Unaka Mountains
      - Unicoi Mountains
    - Great Smoky Mountains
      - Tennessee Valley

=== North Dakota ===
Regions of North Dakota include:

- Badlands
- Drift Prairie
- Missouri Escarpment
- Missouri Plateau (Missouri Coteau in French)
- Red River Valley

=== Northern Mariana Islands ===
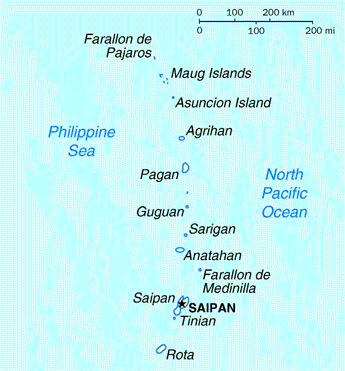
Northern Mariana Islands

Regions of the Northern Mariana Islands include:

- Northern Islands
  - Alamagan
  - Anatahan
  - Agrihan
  - Asuncion Island
  - Farallon de Medinilla
  - Farallon de Pajaros
  - Guguan
  - Maug Islands
  - Pagan
  - Sarigan
- Rota
- Saipan
- Tinian

=== Ohio ===
The Great Black Swamp region of Ohio

Regions of Ohio include:

- Allegheny Plateau
- Appalachian Ohio
- Cincinnati-Northern Kentucky metropolitan area
- Columbus, Ohio metropolitan area
- Connecticut Western Reserve (historic)
- Firelands
- Great Black Swamp (shared with Indiana)
- Lake Erie Islands
- Miami Valley
- Northeast Ohio (often used interchangeably with Greater Cleveland, but also includes the counties of Ashtabula, Portage, Summit, Trumbull, Mahoning and Columbiana.)
- Northwest Ohio

=== Oklahoma ===
The Oklahoma Panhandle

Regions of Oklahoma include:

- Central Oklahoma
- Cherokee Outlet
- Choctaw Country
- Green Country
- Little Dixie
- Northwestern Oklahoma
- Osage Hills
- Panhandle
- South Central Oklahoma
  - Arbuckle Mountains
- Southwestern Oklahoma
  - Wichita Mountains

=== Oregon ===
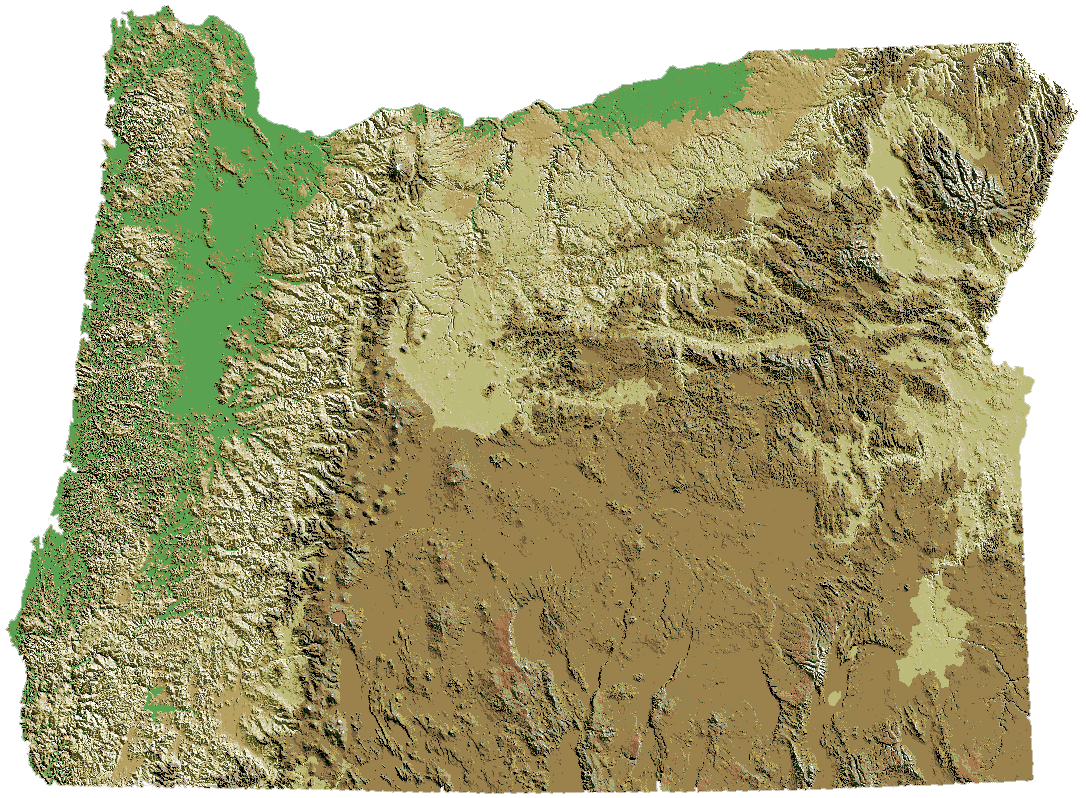
The topography of Oregon

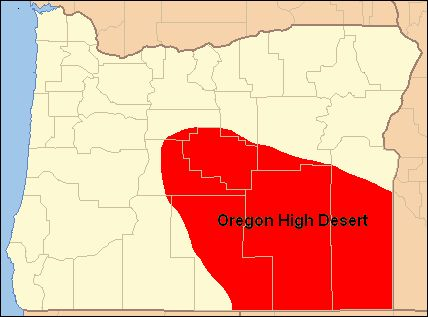
Oregon's High Desert

Regions of Oregon include:

- Cascade Range
- Central Oregon
- Columbia Plateau
- Columbia River
- Columbia River Gorge
- Eastern Oregon
- Goose Lake Valley
- Harney Basin
- High Desert
- Hood River Valley
- Mount Hood Corridor
- Northwest Oregon
- Oregon Coast
- Palouse
- Portland metropolitan area
- Rogue Valley
- Southern Oregon
- Treasure Valley
- Tualatin Valley
- Warner Valley
- Western Oregon
- Willamette Valley

=== Pennsylvania ===
Regions of Pennsylvania include:

- Allegheny National Forest
- Coal Region
- Cumberland Valley
- Delaware River Valley
- Dutch Country
- Endless Mountains
- Highlands Region
- Laurel Highlands
- Lehigh Valley
- Lenapehoking
- Northern Tier
- Northeastern Pennsylvania
- Philadelphia metropolitan area
- Philadelphia Main Line
- Pittsburgh metropolitan area
- Slate Belt
- South Central Pennsylvania
- Susquehanna Valley
- The Poconos
- Western Pennsylvania
- Wyoming Valley

=== Puerto Rico ===
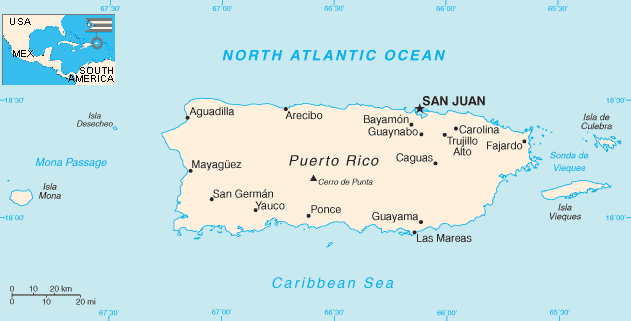
Puerto Rico

Regions of Puerto Rico include:

- Caja de Muertos
- Culebra
- Desecheo Island
- Isla de Mona
- Puerto Rico (main island)
  - Cordillera Central
  - El Yunque
- Vieques

=== Rhode Island ===
Regions of Rhode Island include:

- Blackstone Valley
- Block Island
- East Bay
- West Bay
- South County

=== South Carolina ===
Regions of South Carolina include:

- The Lowcountry
- The Midlands
- The Upstate
- Travel/Tourism locations
  - Grand Strand
  - Lake Murray Country
  - The Lowcountry & Resort Islands
  - Old 96 District
  - Olde English District
  - Pee Dee
  - Santee Cooper Country
- Other geographical distinctions:
  - Blue Ridge Mountains
  - Charleston metropolitan area
  - Columbia metropolitan area
  - Dutch Fork
  - The Piedmont
  - The Sandhills
  - Sea Islands
  - West Ashley

=== South Dakota ===
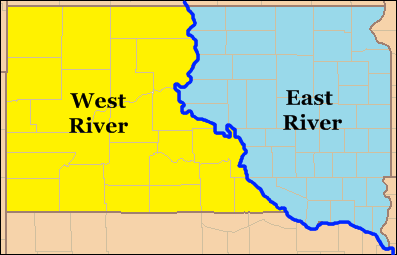
East River and West River in South Dakota

Regions of South Dakota include:

- Badlands
- Black Hills
- Coteau des Prairies
- East River and West River, divided by the Missouri River

=== Tennessee ===
The Grand Divisions of Tennessee include:

- East Tennessee
- Middle Tennessee
- West Tennessee
- Other geographical distinctions:
  - Highland Rim
  - Nashville Basin
  - Tennessee Valley

=== Texas ===
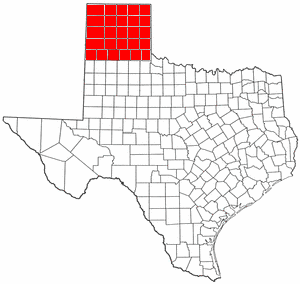
The Texas Panhandle

Regions of Texas include:

- Apacheria
- Brazos Valley
- Central Texas
  - Texas blackland prairies
  - The Hill Country
- Comancheria
- Gulf Coast
  - Galveston Bay
  - Greater Houston
- East Texas
  - Piney Woods and Northeast Texas
- North Texas
  - Dallas–Fort Worth Metroplex
  - Texoma
- South Texas
  - Rio Grande Valley
- Southeast Texas
  - Golden Triangle
  - Greater Houston
- Texas Midwest/West-Central Texas (includes Abilene, San Angelo, Brownwood, Texas)
- Texas Urban Triangle (Houston to San Antonio to Dallas-Fort Worth)
- West Texas
  - Concho Valley
  - Edwards Plateau
  - Llano Estacado (a portion of northwest Texas)
  - Permian Basin
  - South Plains (includes 24 counties south of the Texas Panhandle and north of the Permian Basin)
  - Texas Panhandle (pictured)
  - Trans-Pecos
  - Great Plains

=== U.S. Minor Outlying Islands ===
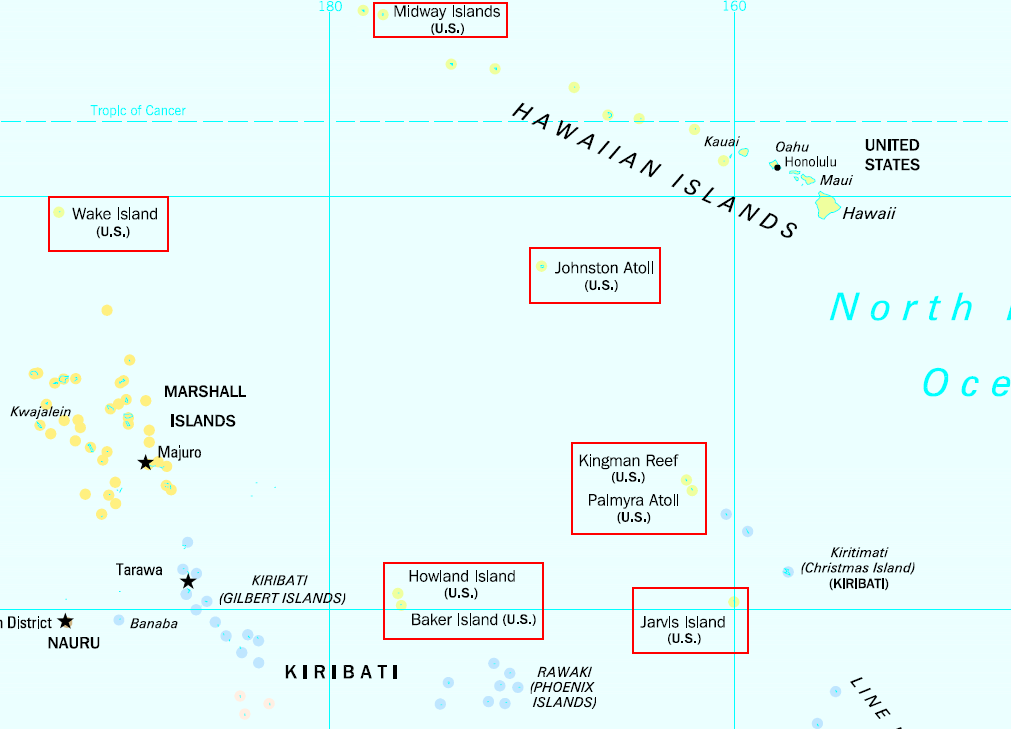
The United States Minor Outlying Islands (Navassa Island not on map)

Regions of United States Minor Outlying Islands include:

- Baker Island
- Howland Island
- Jarvis Island
- Johnston Island
- Kingman Reef
- Midway Atoll
- Navassa Island (Note: Claimed by Haiti.)
- Palmyra Atoll
- Wake Island (Note: Claimed by the Marshall Islands.)

=== U.S. Virgin Islands ===
Regions of United States Virgin Islands include:

- Saint Croix
- Saint John
- Saint Thomas

=== Utah ===
Regions of Utah include:

- Cache Valley
- Colorado Plateau
- Dixie
- Great Salt Lake Desert
- Mojave Desert
- San Rafael Swell
- Uinta Mountains
- Wasatch Back
- Wasatch Front
- Wasatch Range

=== Vermont ===
Regions of Vermont include:

- Burlington metropolitan area
- Champlain Valley
- Green Mountains
- Mount Mansfield
- Northeast Kingdom

=== Virginia ===
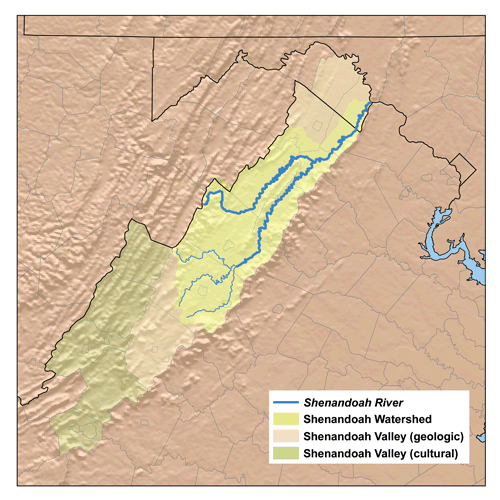
A map of the Shenandoah Valley, a region of Virginia

Regions of Virginia include:

- Eastern Shore
- Greater Richmond Region
- Hampton Roads
- Historic Triangle
- Northern Neck
- Northern Virginia
- Piedmont region of Virginia
- Shenandoah Valley
- South Hampton Roads
- Southside Virginia
- Southwest Virginia
- Tidewater
- Tri-Cities
- Tsenacommacah
- Virginia Peninsula

=== Washington ===
Regions of Washington include:

- Central Washington
- Columbia Plateau
- Eastern Washington
- Kitsap Peninsula
- Long Beach Peninsula
- Okanogan Country
- Olympic Mountains
- Olympic Peninsula
- Puget Sound
- San Juan Islands
- Skagit Valley
- Southwest Washington
- Tri-Cities
- Walla Walla Valley
- Western Washington
- Yakima Valley

=== West Virginia ===
Regions of West Virginia include:

- Eastern Panhandle
- North Central West Virginia
- Northern Panhandle
- Potomac Highlands
- Southern West Virginia

=== Wisconsin ===
Wisconsin's five geographic regions

Wisconsin is divided into five geographic regions:

- Central Plain
- Eastern Ridges and Lowlands
- Lake Superior Lowland
- Northern Highland
- Western Upland

=== Wyoming ===
Regions of Wyoming include:

- Bighorn Basin
- Powder River Country

== See also ==
- Geography of the United States
- Historic regions of the United States
- List of metropolitan areas of the United States
- Media market, e.g., Nielsen Designated Market Area
- Political divisions of the United States
- Regional stock exchanges of the United States
- United States territory
- Vernacular geography
- U.S. Caribbean region
