= Geography of Wisconsin =

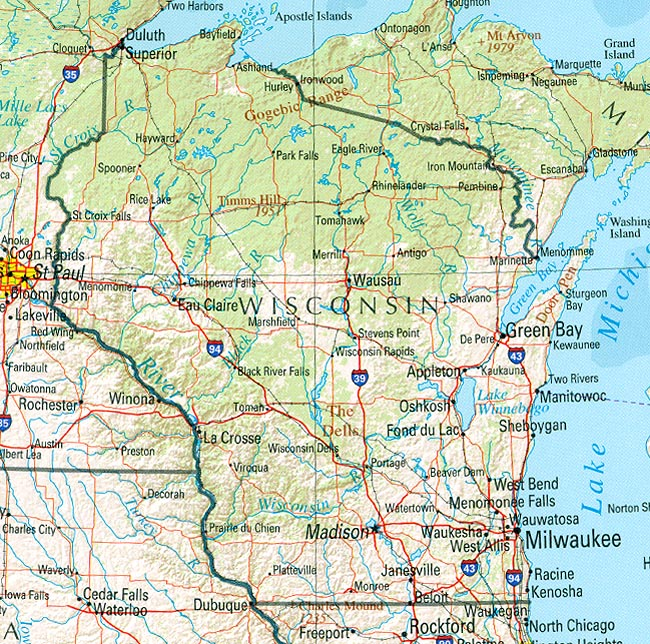
A general map of Wisconsin

Wisconsin, a state in the Midwestern United States, has a vast and diverse geography famous for its landforms created by glaciers during the Wisconsin glaciation 17,000 years ago. The state can be generally divided into five geographic regions—Lake Superior Lowland, Northern Highland, Central Plain, Eastern Ridges & Lowlands, and Western Upland. The southwestern part of the state, which was not covered by glaciers during the most recent ice age, is known as the Driftless Area. The Wisconsin glaciation formed the Wisconsin Dells, Devil's Lake, and the Kettle Moraine. A number of areas are protected in the state, including Devil's Lake State Park, the Apostle Islands National Lakeshore, and the Chequamegon–Nicolet National Forest.

Wisconsin has a humid continental climate across the entire state, with four distinct seasons. Temperatures typically range from a high of 80 °F (27 °C) in the summer months to a low of 5 °F (−15 °C) in the winter months. The state is bounded by several rivers—the Mississippi, St. Croix, and Menominee rivers—and lakes Michigan and Superior. Wisconsin has an average elevation of 1,050 feet (320 m), and is the 23rd-largest in the country, with an area of 65,496 square miles (169,630 km^{2}).

== Location and size ==
Location of Wisconsin in the United States

Wisconsin is located in the East North Central United States, and is considered to be a part of the Midwest. The state has a total area of 65,496 square miles (169,630 km^{2}), making it the 23rd largest U.S. State. Of this area, 17% is water, primarily Lake Michigan, Superior, and the many inland lakes in Wisconsin.

Wisconsin is bordered by Lake Superior and Michigan to the north; by Lake Michigan to the east; by Illinois to the south; by Iowa to the southwest and Minnesota to the northwest. A border dispute with Michigan was settled by two cases, both Wisconsin v. Michigan, in 1935 and 1936. The state's boundaries include the Mississippi and St. Croix Rivers in the west, and the Menominee and Montreal Rivers in the north. The state is in Central Time Zone (UTC-6).

The point farthest from the state border (94.24 mi or 151.66 km) is about 15 miles (24 km) southwest of Wausau at 44.8824°N 89.912°W.

== Human geography ==
Wisconsin Municipalities map of counties, cities, villages, and towns.

As of the 2020 census, Wisconsin had a population of 5,893,718, and ranked 27th in the United States in population density. The center of population is located in Green Lake County, in the city of Markesan.

Wisconsin is divided into 72 counties, and has 190 cities, 407 villages, and 1250 towns. Approximately 939,489 residents live in Milwaukee County, making it both the most populous and most densely populated county. Most of its residents live in the city of Milwaukee, which is the most populous city in the state. Madison, in Dane County, is the capital of the state. Dane County has 561,504 residents, making it the second-most populous. Marathon County is the largest in area, having 1,544.91 square miles (4,001.3 km^{2}). This county contains the 45°N, 90°W point, one of four points that are halfway between both the poles and equator, and between both the Prime and 180th meridian. The location is noted by a metal ground marker.

== Climate ==
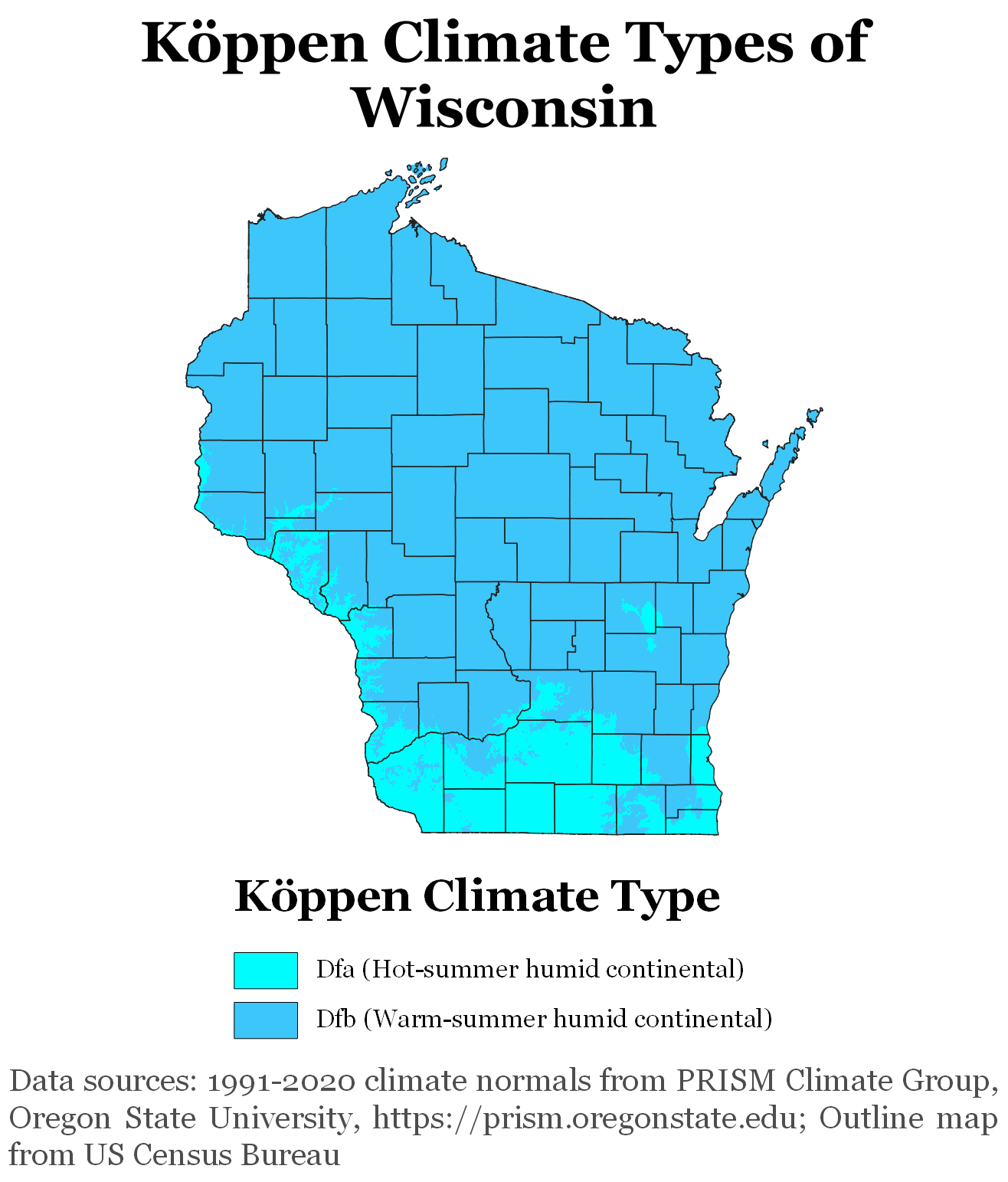
Köppen climate types of Wisconsin, using 1991-2020 climate normals.

Most of Wisconsin has a warm-summer humid continental climate (Köppen Dfb), while southern and southwestern portions are classified as hot-summer humid continental climate (Köppen Dfa). The highest temperature ever recorded in the state was in the Wisconsin Dells, on July 13, 1936, where it reached 114 °F (46 °C). The lowest temperature ever recorded was in the village of Couderay, where it reached −55 °F (−48 °C) on both February 2 and 4, 1996.

Average annual precipitation ranges from 28 inches (710 mm) to 34 inches (860 mm). The state also receives a large amount of regular snowfall, averaging around 40 inches (100 cm) in the southern portions, with up to 160 inches (410 cm) annually in the Lake Superior snowbelt each year.

Climate data for Wisconsin (normals 1981–2010)
Month	Jan	Feb	Mar	Apr	May	Jun	Jul	Aug	Sep	Oct	Nov	Dec	Year
Record high °F (°C)	66 (19)	77 (25)	89 (32)	99 (37)	109 (43)	109 (43)	114 (46)	108 (42)	104 (40)	96 (36)	85 (29)	77 (25)	114 (46)
Mean daily maximum °F (°C)	23.9 (−4.5)	29.2 (−1.6)	40.6 (4.8)	55.5 (13.1)	67.3 (19.6)	76.3 (24.6)	80.4 (26.9)	78.2 (25.7)	69.8 (21.0)	56.9 (13.8)	41.2 (5.1)	27.5 (−2.5)	52.9 (11.6)
Daily mean °F (°C)	15.0 (−9.4)	19.6 (−6.9)	30.5 (−0.8)	44.0 (6.7)	55.3 (12.9)	64.7 (18.2)	69.1 (20.6)	67.1 (19.5)	58.7 (14.8)	46.5 (8.1)	33.1 (0.6)	19.4 (−7.0)	43.6 (6.4)
Mean daily minimum °F (°C)	3.7 (−15.7)	6.3 (−14.3)	18.3 (−7.6)	31.6 (−0.2)	42.6 (5.9)	52.4 (11.3)	57.2 (14.0)	55.0 (12.8)	47.1 (8.4)	36.2 (2.3)	23.7 (−4.6)	10.6 (−11.9)	31.8 (−0.1)
Record low °F (°C)	−54 (−48)	−55 (−48)	−48 (−44)	−28 (−33)	5 (−15)	20 (−7)	23 (−5)	20 (−7)	9 (−13)	−7 (−22)	−34 (−37)	−52 (−47)	−55 (−48)
Average precipitation inches (mm)	1.15 (29)	1.03 (26)	1.80 (46)	2.63 (67)	3.54 (90)	4.17 (106)	3.79 (96)	3.78 (96)	3.75 (95)	2.38 (60)	2.00 (51)	1.27 (32)	31.29 (794)
Average snowfall inches (cm)	11.4 (29)	9.5 (24)	8.7 (22)	3.2 (8.1)	0.4 (1.0)	0.0 (0.0)	0.0 (0.0)	0.0 (0.0)	0.0 (0.0)	0.8 (2.0)	4.9 (12)	10.2 (26)	48.7 (124)
Source: "Wisconsin State Climatology Office".

== Geographic regions ==
Wisconsin is divided into five geographic regions.

Wisconsin, located between the Great Lakes and the Mississippi River, is home to a wide variety of geographical features. The state can generally be divided into five distinct regions—Lake Superior Lowland, Northern Highland, Central Plain, Western Upland, and Eastern Ridges & Lowlands. Lawrence Martin created this schema for dividing the state into geographic regions. The different regions are defined by the differing effects of glaciers during the Wisconsin glaciation.

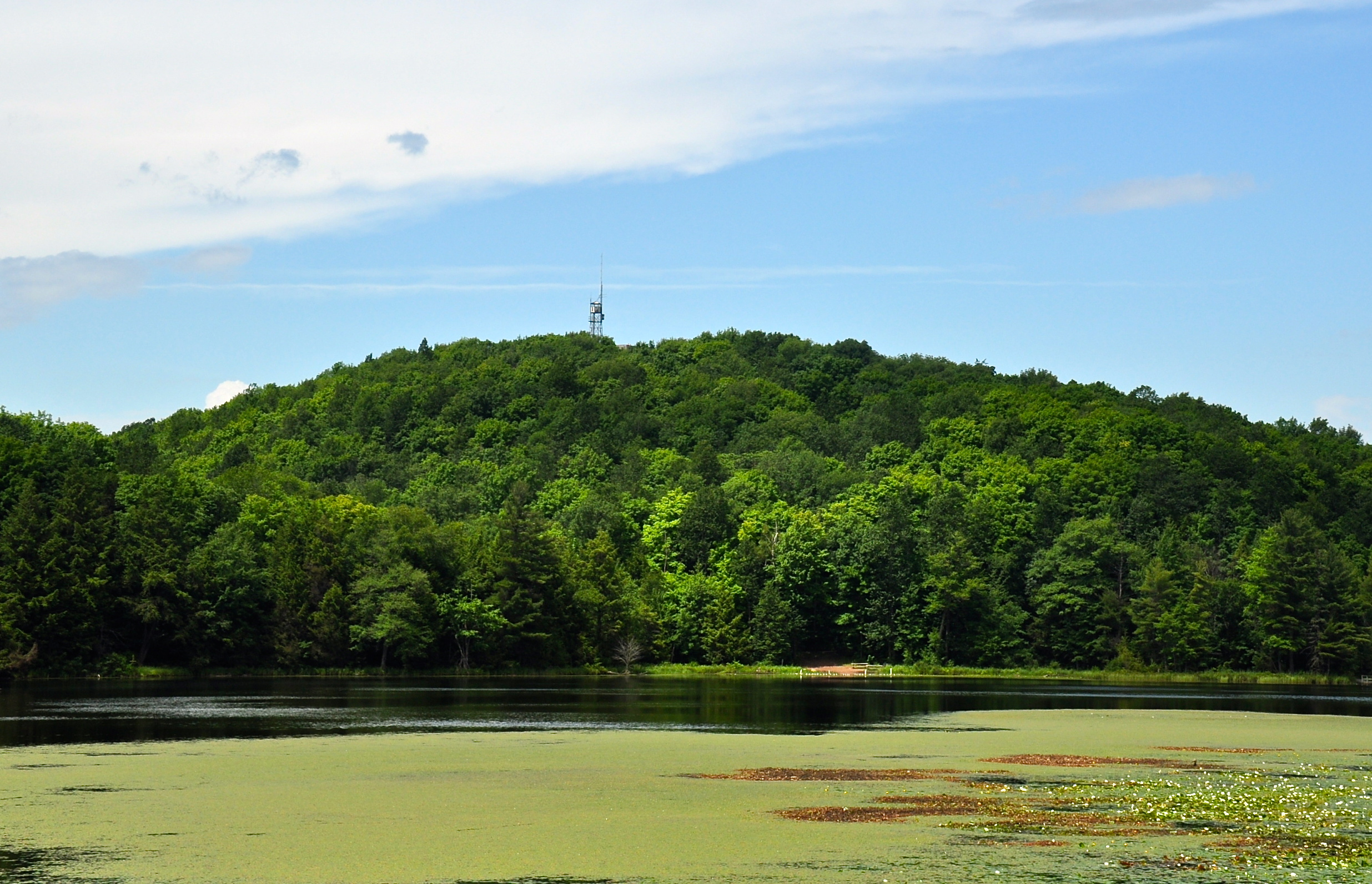
Timms Hill is the highest natural point in Wisconsin at 1,951.5 ft (594.8 m); it is located in the town of Hill, Price County.

In the north, the Lake Superior Lowland occupies a belt of land along Lake Superior. The region is a flat plain, gently sloping downward to Lake Superior. Much of the area is forested—dominated by aspen and birch trees. The region also includes the Apostle Islands National Lakeshore. In the north-central part of the state, the Northern Highland has massive mixed hardwood and coniferous forests including the 1,500,000-acre (6,100 km^{2}) Chequamegon-Nicolet National Forest, as well as thousands of glacial lakes. The terrain is generally higher than the rest of the state, with frequent hills, and includes the state's highest point, Timms Hill.

In the middle of the state, the Central Plain has many unique sandstone formations like the Dells of the Wisconsin River, in addition to rich farmland. The region is generally a flat sandy plain, much of which was covered by Glacial Lake Wisconsin. In the southwest, the Western Upland is a rugged landscape with a mix of forest and farmland, including many bluffs on the Mississippi River. The region is defined by its hilly irregular terrain, including all the Baraboo Range. The Western Upland is part of the Driftless Area, which also includes portions of Iowa, Illinois, and Minnesota. This area was not covered by glaciers during the most recent ice age, the Wisconsin Glaciation. This area contains many of the caves in Wisconsin, including the Natural Landmark Cave of the Mounds. Langlade County has a soil rarely found outside of the county called Antigo silt loam.

The Eastern Ridges and Lowlands region, in the southeast, is home to many of the state's largest cities. The region is located west of Lake Michigan, and is primarily a plain, sloping down to the lake. The ridges include the Niagara Escarpment, the Black River Escarpment, and the Magnesian Escarpment.

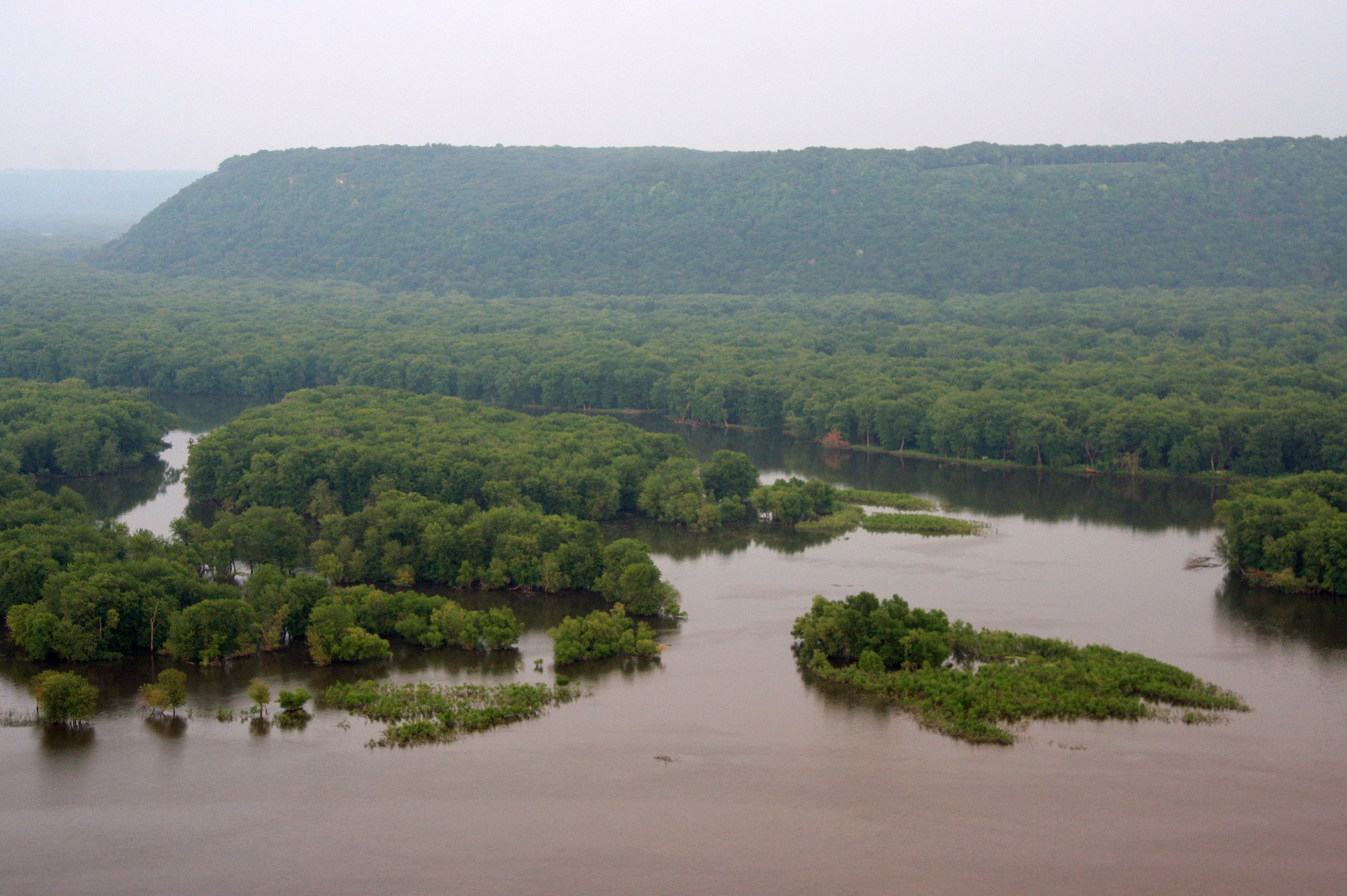
The Driftless Area of southwestern Wisconsin is characterized by bluffs carved in sedimentary rock by water from melting Ice age glaciers. Pictured is the confluence of the Mississippi and Wisconsin rivers.

== Geology ==
Wisconsin has geologic formations and deposits that vary in age from over three billion years to several thousand years, with most rocks being millions of years old. The oldest geologic formations were created over 600 million years ago during the Precambrian, with the majority being below the glacial deposits. Proterozoic rocks form much of Wisconsin's unique deposits. Much of the Baraboo Range consists of Baraboo Quartzite, and other Precambrian metamorphic rock.

During the Pleistocene, massive glaciers covered Wisconsin. The glaciers flattened mountains, carved bedrock, and deposited sand and gravel in many areas of the state. The many lakes are a result of this glaciation carving out low spots in the terrain.

Various escarpments cut through Wisconsin. The Niagara Escarpment is the longest, running from New York through Ontario, Michigan, Wisconsin, and Illinois. The Black River Escarpment runs near the Niagara Escarpment. The Magnesian Escarpment is the most prominent, running north to south. The bedrock of the Niagara Escarpment is dolomite, while the two shorter ridges have limestone bedrock.

== Physical geography ==
=== Rivers ===
Wisconsin is bordered by the Mississippi River and St. Croix River to the west. The state has more than 12,000 named rivers and streams, totaling 84,000 miles (135,000 km) in length.

The state is named after the 430 miles (690 km) long Wisconsin River. Its name is derived from the Algonquin languages of the indigenous people. The name was first recorded as "Meskousing" by Jacques Marquette in 1673, but was later modified to "Ouisconsin" by later French explorers in the 18th century. The name was finally simplified to "Wisconsin" in the 19th century, as it was applied to the new Wisconsin Territory. The river originates in the Lac Vieux Desert near the border with the Upper Peninsula of Michigan. It flows south along the glacial plain of central Wisconsin, before turning westward in Portage and joining the Mississippi River 3 miles (4.8 km) south of Prairie du Chien. The Baraboo River is a tributary, and one of the longest free flowing waterways in the United States.

The Fox River originates in central Wisconsin, flowing northward through Lake Winnebago, and into the Bay of Green Bay, with the city of Green Bay being at its mouth. The two sections of the Fox River total 182 miles (293 km), and counting the distance through Lake Winnebago gives 200 miles (320 km). The name is derived from a translation of the name of the Meskwaki people, as the river runs through their territory. The Fox Cities metropolitan area includes many cities along the river.

=== Lakes ===
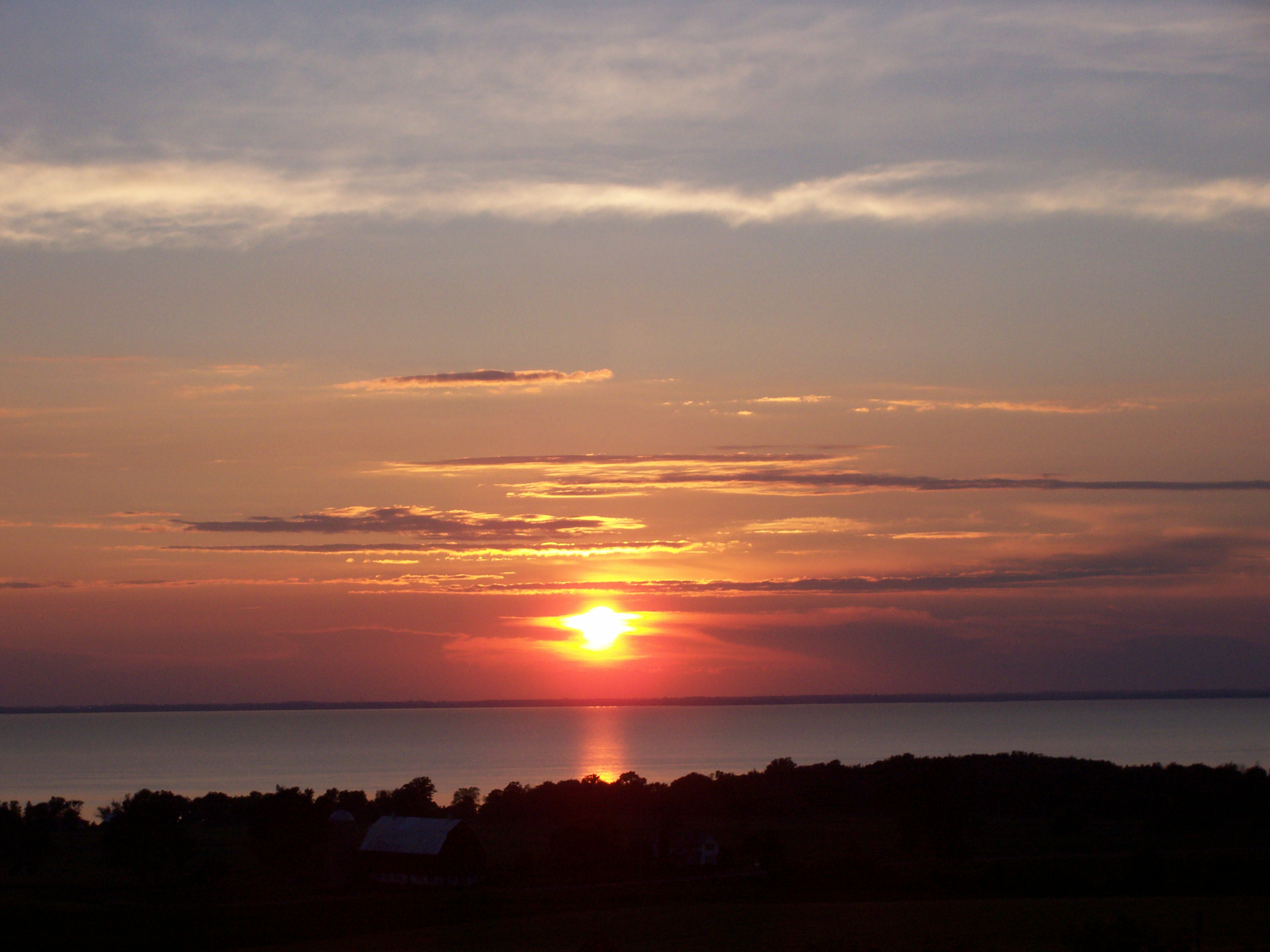
Sunset over Lake Winnebago

Wisconsin is bordered by Lake Superior in the north and Lake Michigan in the east. The state has over 15,000 named lakes, totaling about 1 million acres (4,000 km^{2}). Within Wisconsin, Lakes Superior and Michigan total 6.4 million acres (26,000 km^{2}). Along the two great lakes, Wisconsin has over 500 miles (800 km) of shoreline. Lake Winnebago is the largest inland lake, totaling over 137,700 acres (557 km^{2}), and 88 miles (142 km) of shoreline. The lake was derived from Glacial Lake Oshkosh approximately 12,000 years ago. Devil's Lake is rectangular in shape, and is over a mile long from north to south, and a half mile east to west. Lake Wisconsin is a reservoir along the Wisconsin River, and covers 1,500 acres (6.1 km^{2}).

=== Islands ===
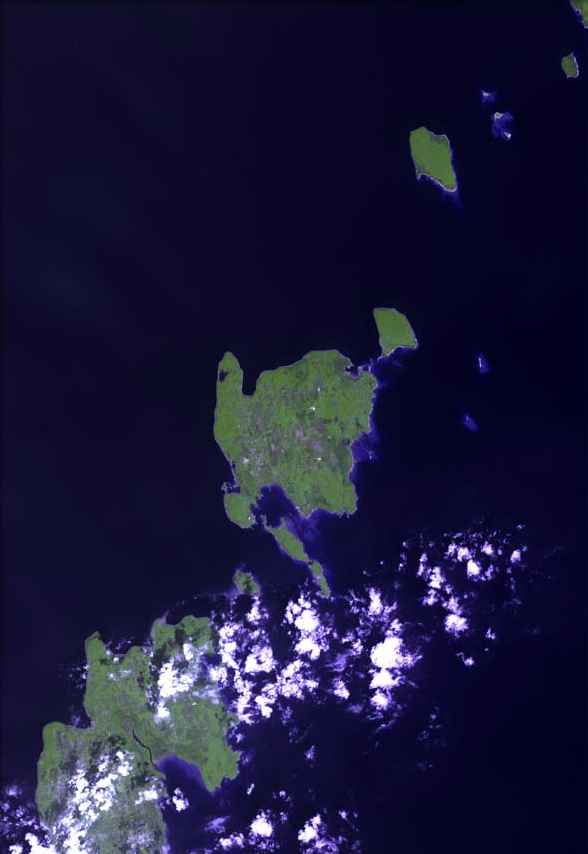
Islands off the Door Peninsula

A lot of the named islands in Wisconsin are in the Great Lakes. Many surround the Door Peninsula in Lake Michigan, or are part of the Apostle Islands in Lake Superior. The Mississippi River also has a multitude of islands on the state's western boundary. Inland lakes and rivers contain the rest of the islands of Wisconsin. Many lakes, including Beaver Dam Lake, Fox Lake, and Lake Winnebago, have an abundance of islands. Large rivers, like the Wisconsin River and Fox River, have many islands as well. Doty Island, in the Fox River, is one mile wide and one and a half miles long. French Island, in the Mississippi River within the city of La Crosse, covers an area of 2.02 square miles (5.2 km^{2}) and has a population of 4,207.

Madeline Island in Lake Superior is the largest of the Apostle Islands. The community of La Pointe is on the western shore, and the island as a whole has a population of 302. Washington Island in Lake Michigan is 7 miles (11 km) northeast of the tip of the Door Peninsula. The island is five miles wide by eight miles long, and covers an area of 23.51 miles (37.84 km). The town of Washington Island covers the island, as well as surrounding islands, with a total population of 708.

=== Aquifer ===
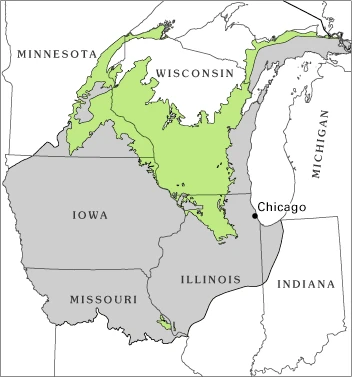
Cambrian-Ordovician Aquifer System Shallow aquifer Extent of the aquifer

The Cambrian-Ordovician Aquifer is shallow primarily under Wisconsin but extends into Illinois, Iowa, Indiana, Minnesota, Missouri, and the Upper Peninsula of Michigan. The water from the aquifer is being pumped up and drained by agriculture, commercial, and residential use that is unsustainable.

== Protected areas ==
Devils Island shoreline, Apostle Islands National Lakeshore

Wisconsin has 67 state parks, covering more than 60,570 acres (245.1 km^{2}), and several are nationally recognized. Chippewa Moraine State Recreation Area covers 3,063 acres (12.40 km^{2}), and preserves numerous glacial landforms. The Ice Age National Scenic Trail runs through the park. Devil's Lake State Park is located in the Baraboo Range, south of Baraboo, and covers 9,217 acres (37.30 km^{2}), making it the largest park in the state. The state park also includes the 500-foot-high (150 m) quartzite bluffs surrounding the lake, and 11 miles (18 km) of the Ice Age Trail. Interstate State Park consists of two adjacent state parks on the Minnesota–Wisconsin border. The Wisconsin side covers 1,330 acres (5.4 km^{2}), and the Minnesota side covers 298 acres (1.21 km^{2}). The parks straddle the Dalles of the St. Croix River, a deep basalt gorge. Wyalusing State Park is located at the confluence of the Wisconsin and Mississippi Rivers, and covers 2,628 acres (10.64 km^{2}).

Wisconsin also has protected areas under the management of the National Park Service. The Apostle Islands National Lakeshore, along Lake Superior, is a national lakeshore consisting of 21 of the Apostle Islands, totaling 69,372 acres (280.74 km^{2}). The Ice Age Trail is a National Scenic Trail covering 1,200 miles (1,900 km), following the terminal moraine of the Wisconsin Glaciation. The western terminus is located in Interstate State Park, and the eastern end is in Potawatomi State Park, along the Door Peninsula. The trail passes through 30 of Wisconsin's 72 counties. The Saint Croix National Scenic Riverway protects 252 miles (406 km) of the St. Croix and Namekagon Rivers.

Wisconsin has several state forests, covering more than 471,329 acres (1,907.40 km^{2}). Total forested land covers 16 million acres (65,000 km^{2}), or 46%, of the state's land area. The Kettle Moraine State Forest covers 56,000 acres (230 km^{2}) in the southeastern part of the state. The principal feature of the forest is the Kettle Moraine, which was created during the Wisconsin Glaciation. There is one national forest managed by the U.S. Forest Service in the state, Chequamegon-Nicolet National Forest. It was established in 1933 as two separate forests, but has been maintained as a single entity since 1998.
