= Sugarbush Hill =

Peak in Wisconsin

- Rat Lake Hill
- Location within Wisconsin

Highest point
- Elevation: 1,939 ft (591 m)
- Coordinates: 45°33′28″N 88°48′50″W

Naming
- Etymology: Grove of Sugar Maple trees

Geography
- Location: Forest County, Wisconsin US
- Region: Northern Highland

Sugarbush Hill, also known as Rat Lake Hill in Forest County, is a peak with the second highest elevation in the U.S. state of Wisconsin. The peak is on the Forest County Potawatomi Indian Reservation and it is considered sacred by that community.

== Location ==
The peak is the second highest elevation in Wisconsin at 1,939 ft (591 m) above sea level. It is located in Forest County, Wisconsin. The Forest County government website states that Sugarbush Hill is "just off State Highway 32 and US Highway 8 between Laona and Crandon". The geographical region of the state where Sugarbush Hill is located is referred to as the Northern Highland.

== History ==
The Native Americans taught settlers in Wisconsin how to make maple syrup and sugar from maple trees. A grove of maple trees is commonly referred to as a "sugar bush". The hill was named for the maple trees that surround it. The land is on the Forest County Potawatomi Indian Reservation and it is considered sacred.

A large fire tower was situated near the top of the peak. In 1939, the Wisconsin State Journal stated that the tower was 110 ft (34 m) tall. A local resident confined himself to the tower in 1939 and held a strike. The tower has since been removed. People suspected that the sitdown strike was a publicity stunt meant to call attention to Sugarbush Hill as the tallest peak in Wisconsin. The locals near Rib Mountain claimed that their peak was higher and they referred to Sugarbush Hill as "Rat Hill": a name that was in use for the hill in the 1930s. In 1956, the Wisconsin Historical Society placed a historical marker near the hill.

== Elevation controversy ==
At different times, three separate hills in the state of Wisconsin were referred to as the highest elevation. In 1937, the Antigo Journal called Sugarbush Hill "Rat Lake Hill" and stated that a geological survey had determined that Rat Lake Hill was the highest point in the state. One local newspaper proposed that the hill be made into a state park. Prior to the geological survey, Rib Mountain was thought to be the highest point in Wisconsin.

In 1951, the Wisconsin State Journal called Sugarbush Hill the highest elevation in Wisconsin with a height of 1,950.8 ft (594.6 m). In August 2023, the Milwaukee Journal Sentinel stated that Timms Hill in the town of Hill is the highest elevation in Wisconsin at 1,951.5 ft (594.8 m). The Forest County government website refers to Sugarbush Hill as the "third highest part of our state".
