= Northern Highland =

Geographical region of Wisconsin

Coordinates: 45.6°N 89.45°W

Location of the Northern Highlands in the United States

Wisconsin can be divided into five geographic regions. The Northern Highland is highlighted in yellow.

The Northern Highland is a geographical region in the north central United States covering much of the northern territory of the state of Wisconsin.

The region stretches from the state border with Minnesota in the west to the Michigan border in the east, and from Douglas and Bayfield Counties in the north to Wood and Portage Counties in the south. While most of northern Wisconsin is within the Northern Highland region, a short belt of land along the coast of Lake Superior is not included in the area, and is instead part of the Lake Superior Lowland region. Outside Wisconsin the highland stretches northward in Canada through the Upper Peninsula of Michigan and the Canadian Shield in Northern Ontario and Quebec to Labrador and Hudson Bay.

== Geography ==
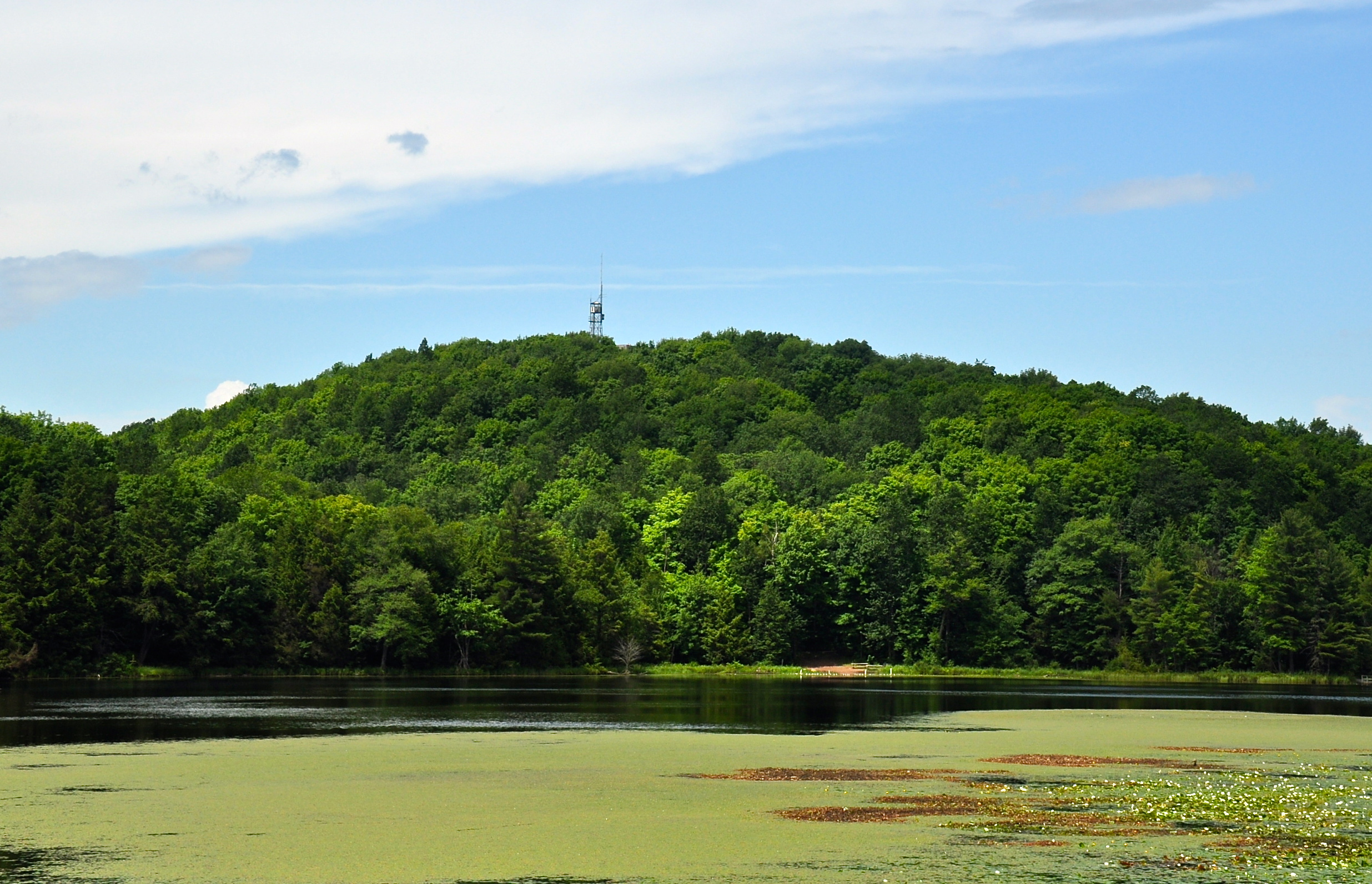
Timms Hill, the highest natural point in Wisconsin is located in the Northern Highlands in the Town of Hill, Price County.

The Northern Highland was once a mountain range similar to the Alps or Rocky Mountains of today. Over hundreds of millions of years, these mountains were worn and flattened out by erosion and glaciation. The region is mostly a smooth plain, but it remains higher than the rest of the state and some hilly regions continue to exist. Located near the center of the region, Timms Hill in Price County is the highest point in Wisconsin, at an elevation of 1,951 feet (595 m) feet above sea level. Other hills such as Rib Mountain also approach this elevation. The second highest elevation in the state of Wisconsin is found in the Northern Highland and it is Sugarbush hill which is in Forest County.

Whether hilly or flat, most of the Northern Highland is covered in woodlands. The most common trees of the Northern Highland are the Sugar Maple, Aspen, Basswood, Hemlock, and Yellow Birch, as well as Red and White Pine. A large amount of the forestland in the region is included within the 1,519,800-acre (6,150 km^{2}) Chequamegon-Nicolet National Forest. State and county forests also cover a significant part of the region, and only a small portion of the land is devoted to agriculture.

The largest city in the region is Wausau, with a population of 39,994. Other principal cities include Merrill, Rhinelander, and Ladysmith. Despite the absence of large cities, tourism is an important part of the local economy. The region’s numerous lakes and forests make it a popular destination for outdoor enthusiasts during the summer season.

This is part of a northern Wisconsin area colloquially referred to as "up north."

== Northern Highland Lake District ==
The Northern Highland Lake District consists of Lake Peter, Paul, and Tuesday. These lakes appeared during an ice age around 12,000 years ago.

== Wildlife ==
The wildlife of the Northern Highlands includes whitetail deer, timber wolves, elk, moose, and bear. With a growing population of the timber wolf, Wisconsin officials have agreed to allow a lottery system for the hunting of these wolves.

== Counties in the Northern Highland ==
Part or all of the land in the following counties is included in the Northern Highland of Wisconsin:

- Ashland County
- Bayfield County
- Burnett County
- Chippewa County
- Douglas County
- Florence County
- Forest County
- Iron County
- Langlade County
- Lincoln County
- Marathon County
- Marinette County
- Menominee County
- Oconto County
- Oneida County
- Portage County
- Price County
- Rusk County
- Sawyer County
- Shawano County
- Taylor County
- Vilas County
- Washburn County
- Wood County
