= International border states of the United States =

States in the U.S. that border either Canada, Mexico, Cuba, the Bahamas, or Russia

International border states are shown in red on this map. Florida shares a water border with Cuba and The Bahamas.

The international border states are those states in the U.S. that border either the Bahamas, Canada, Cuba, Mexico, or Russia. With a total of eighteen of such states, thirteen (including Alaska) lie on the U.S.–Canada border, four lie on the U.S.–Mexico border, and one has maritime borders with Cuba and The Bahamas.

== Border with Canada ==
Thirteen states lie on the U.S.–Canada border. The U.S. states of Indiana, Illinois, and Wisconsin do not share a direct geographic border with Canada. They do, however, possess customs facilities because they border the Great Lakes, on which international commerce comes from Canada. (All three states border Lake Michigan, while Wisconsin also borders Lake Superior.)

State	Adjacent province or territory	Length of border	Description (if not land border)
Alaska	British Columbia and Yukon	1,538 mi (2,475 km)	
Michigan	Ontario	721 mi (1,160 km)	Water boundary (land border on Crystal Island)
Maine	New Brunswick, Nova Scotia, and Quebec	611 mi (983 km)	Water boundary with Nova Scotia
Minnesota	Manitoba and Ontario	547 mi (880 km)	Water boundary with Ontario
Montana	Alberta, British Columbia, and Saskatchewan	545 mi (877 km)	
New York	Ontario and Quebec	445 mi (716 km)	Water and land boundary with Ontario
Washington	British Columbia	427 mi (687 km)	
North Dakota	Manitoba and Saskatchewan	310 mi (499 km)	
Ohio	Ontario	146 mi (235 km)	On Lake Erie
Vermont	Quebec	90 mi (145 km)	
New Hampshire	Quebec	58 mi (93 km)	
Idaho	British Columbia	45 mi (72 km)	
Pennsylvania	Ontario	42 mi (68 km)	On Lake Erie

== Border with Mexico ==
Four states lie on the U.S.–Mexico border.

State	Adjacent Mexican state	Length of border	Description
Texas	Chihuahua, Coahuila, Nuevo Leon, and Tamaulipas	1,241 mi (1,997 km)	
Arizona	Baja California and Sonora	373 mi (600 km)	
New Mexico	Chihuahua and Sonora	180 mi (290 km)	
California	Baja California	140 mi (225 km)	

== Borders with other countries ==
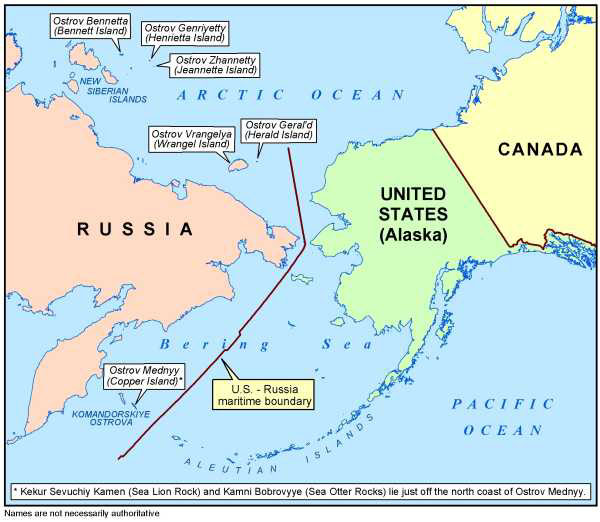
Alaska's maritime boundary with Russia

In addition to the states bordering on Canada and Mexico, the U.S. state of Florida shares maritime boundaries with Cuba and the Bahamas, and Alaska shares a water boundary with Russia (in addition to its land border with Canada).

State	Length of border	Bordering country
Alaska	1,538 mi (2,475 km)	Russia (water boundary) (Canada to the east)
Florida		Cuba and the Bahamas (water boundaries)

== See also ==
- Borders of the United States
- List of regions of the United States
