= U.S. Caribbean region =

Natural region of the United States consisting of federally-owned waters

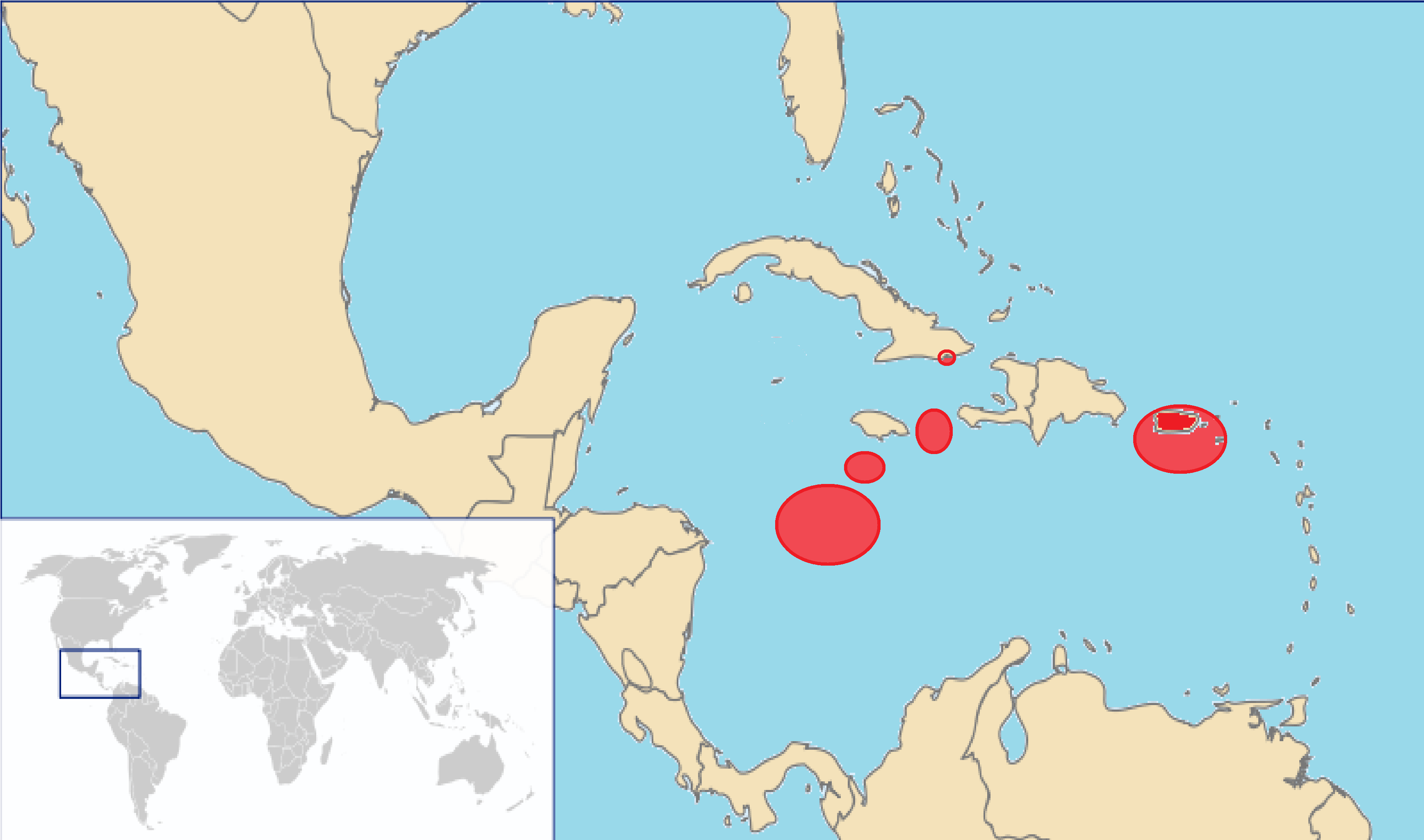
Map of the U.S. Caribbean Federal Waters

U.S. Caribbean region (in Spanish: El Caribe estadounidense) is a term used by the National Oceanic and Atmospheric Administration (NOAA) to refer to the waters belonging to the United States in the Caribbean Sea. NOAA maps it as a natural region of the United States, located in the Caribbean Sea, made up of federal waters in and around Puerto Rico, the US Virgin Islands, Navassa Island, and the Guantánamo Bay Naval Base. Serranilla Bank, an uninhabited island, and Bajo Nuevo Bank, which are currently controlled by Colombia but claimed by the United States, are sometimes included in the region by NOAA. The U.S. Caribbean region is a natural region and not a political or administrative region.
