= Regions of Wisconsin =

Coordinates: 44.5°N 89.5°W

Wisconsin can be divided into five geographic regions.

There are a variety of schema for dividing Wisconsin into regions.

== Physical Geography ==
Professor Lawrence Martin created a schema for dividing Wisconsin into geographical regions in his work "The Physical Geography of Wisconsin".

- Western Upland
- Eastern Ridges and Lowlands
- Central Plain
- Northern Highland
- Lake Superior Lowland

Three of these geographical provinces are uplands and two are lowlands. These provinces are related to the use of the land by plants, by animals, and by man. Each differs from the others in roughness or smoothness of topography, infertility or sterility of soil, in climate, in adaptation to occupation by wild plants (including forests), by cultivated plants (including crops and orchards), by animals, and by man, as well as in the extent to which men have developed such resources during the march of Wisconsin history.

The boundaries of all five provinces are determined largely by the variations of texture and structure in the underlying rocks. The geographical regions have internal unity and significant contrast with neighboring regions in uses of the land by living things, including man.

== Wisconsin Department of Natural Resources Regions ==
The regions of Wisconsin, as described by the Wisconsin DNR.

The Wisconsin DNR uses the following regions

- Northern (NO)
  - Counties: Ashland, Barron, Bayfield, Burnett, Douglas, Iron, Polk, Price, Rusk, Sawyer, Taylor, Washburn. Florence, Forest, Langlade, Lincoln, Oneida, Vilas
- Northeast (NE)
  - Counties: Brown, Calumet, Door, Fond du Lac, Green Lake, Kewaunee, Manitowoc, Marinette, Marquette, Menominee, Oconto, Outagamie, Shawano, Waupaca, Waushara, Winnebago
- South Central (SC)
  - Counties: Columbia, Dane, Dodge, Green, Grant, Iowa, Jefferson, Lafayette, Richland, Rock, Sauk
- Southeast (SE)
  - Counties: Kenosha, Milwaukee, Ozaukee, Racine, Sheboygan, Walworth, Washington, Waukesha
- West Central (WC)
  - Counties: Adams, Buffalo, Chippewa, Clark, Crawford, Dunn, Eau Claire, Jackson, Juneau, La Crosse, Marathon, Monroe, Pepin, Pierce, Portage, St. Croix, Trempealeau, Vernon, Wood

== Wisconsin DOT Regions ==
The Wisconsin DOT uses the following regions:

- North Central Region
  - Counties: Adams, Florence, Forest, Green Lake, Iron, Langlade, Lincoln, Marathon, Marquette, Menominee, Oneida, Portage, Price, Shawano, Vilas, Waupaca, Waushara and Wood counties.
- Northeast Region
  - Counties: Brown, Calumet, Door, Fond du Lac, Kewaunee, Manitowoc, Marinette, Oconto, Outagamie, Sheboygan and Winnebago counties.
- Northwest Region
  - Counties: Ashland, Barron, Bayfield, Buffalo, Burnett, Chippewa, Clark, Douglas, Dunn, Eau Claire, Jackson, Pepin, Pierce, Polk, Rusk, Sawyer, St. Croix, Taylor, Trempealeau and Washburn counties.
- Southeast Region
  - Counties: Kenosha, Milwaukee, Ozaukee, Racine, Walworth, Washington and Waukesha counties.
- Southwest Region
  - Counties: Columbia, Crawford, Dane, Dodge, Grant, Green, Iowa, Jefferson, Juneau, La Crosse, Lafayette, Monroe, Richland, Rock, Sauk and Vernon counties.
