= Western Upland =

Geographical region of Wisconsin

Coordinates: 43°45′N 90°40′W

The geographical regions of Wisconsin

The Western Upland is a geographical region covering much of the western half of the U.S. state of Wisconsin. It stretches from southern Polk County, Wisconsin in the north to the state border with Illinois in the south, and from Rock County in the east to the Mississippi River in the west.

== Geography ==
Wisconsin's Western Upland is a rugged, hilly region deeply dissected by rivers and streams. The area is characterized by rocky outcroppings and numerous small caves, as well as sharp and frequent changes in altitude. The elevation in the region ranges from about 600 feet (180 m) above sea level in the Mississippi River Valley to more than 1,700 feet (520 m) above sea level at Blue Mound State Park, in Iowa County. The Mississippi, Wisconsin, Kickapoo, Black, and Chippewa rivers all carve deep gorges through the upland. Even most small creeks and streams have coulees penetrating some 200 to 300 feet (61 to 91 m) deeper than the surrounding land. Meanwhile, highlands like Military Ridge, the Baraboo Range, and a host of unnamed ridges have elevations that are in excess of 1,200 feet (370 m) above sea level. Before the last ice age, most of the land in the northern United States was similar to the land of today's Western Upland, with rugged ridges and valleys. But as glaciers came to cover the continent, they toppled the ridges and filled in the valleys, creating smooth plains. The Western Upland of Wisconsin is part of the Driftless Area, a region that has avoided being covered by glaciers for the past several million years. This explains why the region has retained its rugged landscape.

Farmland is prevalent in the Western Upland anywhere where the slope of the land is gradual enough to permit it, generally on the ridge tops and the valley bottoms. Both fields and pastureland are common in the region. The hillsides and narrow ravines that are unsuitable for agriculture are covered in forests. Oak, hickory, maple, and birch trees dominate the woodlands of the Western Upland. Several small cities are scattered along the ridges and valleys. With a population of 59,498, the largest city in the Western Upland is Janesville in the extreme southeast corner of the region. La Crosse, with a population of 51,818, occupies a more central position along the Mississippi River. Other principal cities include Beloit, Monroe, Platteville, Dodgeville, Richland Center, Prairie du Chien, and Sparta.

== Counties in the Western Upland ==
Part or all of the land in the following counties is included in the Western Upland of Wisconsin:

- Buffalo County
- Crawford County
- Dane County
- Eau Claire County
- Grant County
- Green County
- Iowa County
- Jackson County
- Juneau County
- La Crosse County
- Lafayette County
- Monroe County
- Pepin County
- Pierce County
- Polk County
- Richland County
- Rock County
- Sauk County
- St. Croix County
- Trempealeau County
- Vernon County

== See also ==
- Driftless area
- Wisconsin
