= Central Plain (Wisconsin) =

Geographical region of Wisconsin

Coordinates: 44°00′N 89°30′W

The geographical regions of Wisconsin

In the U.S. state of Wisconsin, the Central Plain is a geographical region consisting of about 13,000 square miles (34,000 km^{2}) of land in a v-shaped belt across the center of the state. Beginning in the west, the Central Plain originates in Burnett and Polk Counties and runs southeast to Columbia County, where it turns northeast and reaches its end in Marinette County.

The Central Plain region generally takes the form of a flat sandy plain with elevations between 700 and 800 feet (240 m) above sea level. There are variations on the flatland, however. Hills in Barron County possess the region’s highest altitudes, reaching more than 1,200 feet (370 m) above sea level. This section of the region is primarily a hardwood forest of maple, birch, and aspen, but there are several areas of agriculture scattered across the area. The plain is occasionally broken by rolling hills throughout its western half. Plains which were once the bed of Glacial Lake Wisconsin dominate the south central part of the region. Farms, fields, and cranberry bogs cover the landscape, and sandstone buttes and mesas are not uncommon. The Wisconsin River dissects the plain here, creating the Wisconsin Dells. East of the river, moraines and small kettle lakes are interspersed throughout the plain. Forests and wetlands mark the northeastern section of the region.

For the most part, the Central Plain is a rural area of farmland and forests. Population is sparse. The city of Eau Claire, Wisconsin is located on the southern border of the plain’s northwest end, and is the region’s largest city with a population of 61,704. Other principal cities in the Central Plain region include Chippewa Falls and Menomonie in the northwest, as well as Stevens Point and Wisconsin Rapids along the Wisconsin River.

== Counties in the Central Plain ==
Part or all of the land in the following counties is included in the Central Plains of Wisconsin:

- Adams County
- Barron County
- Burnett County
- Chippewa County
- Clark County
- Columbia County
- Dunn County
- Eau Claire County
- Green Lake County
- Jackson County
- Juneau County
- Marinette County
- Marquette County
- Menominee County
- Oconto County
- Outagamie County
- Polk County
- Portage County
- Sauk County
- Sawyer County
- Shawano County
- Washburn County
- Waupaca County
- Waushara County
- Wood County
