= East North Central states =

Group of states in the US

East North Central
- Region
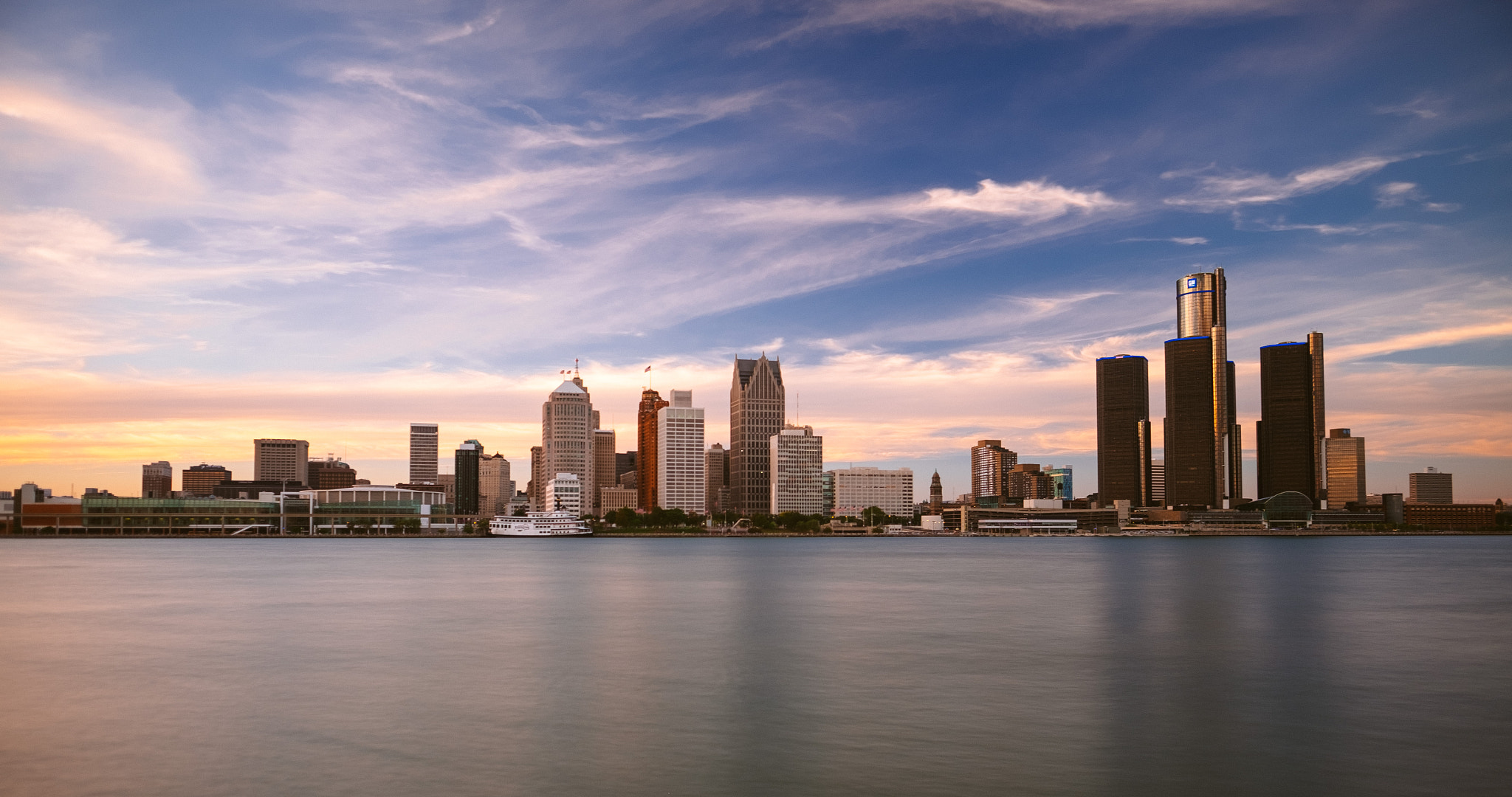
- Chicago Wisconsin River The Children's Museum of Indianapolis Detroit Pictured Rocks on Lake Superior Rock and Roll Hall of Fame Columbus

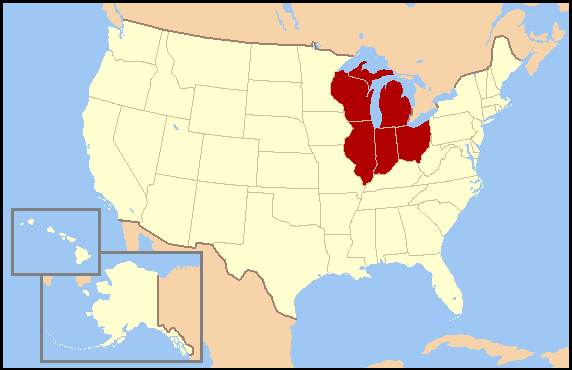
- Composition: Illinois; Indiana; Michigan; Ohio; Wisconsin
- Metropolitan areas: Chicago, IL; Rockford, IL; Springfield, IL; Peoria, IL; Cincinnati, OH; Cleveland, OH; Columbus, OH; Detroit, MI; Toledo, OH; Grand Rapids, MI; Kalamazoo, MI; Traverse City, MI; Indianapolis, IN; Fort Wayne, IN; Evansville, IN; South Bend, IN; Milwaukee, WI; Madison, WI; Eau Claire, WI; Green Bay, WI
- Largest city: Chicago

Area
  - Total: 299,170 sq mi (774,800 km^{2})

Population (2020)
  - Total: 47,368,533
  - Density: 158/sq mi (61/km^{2})

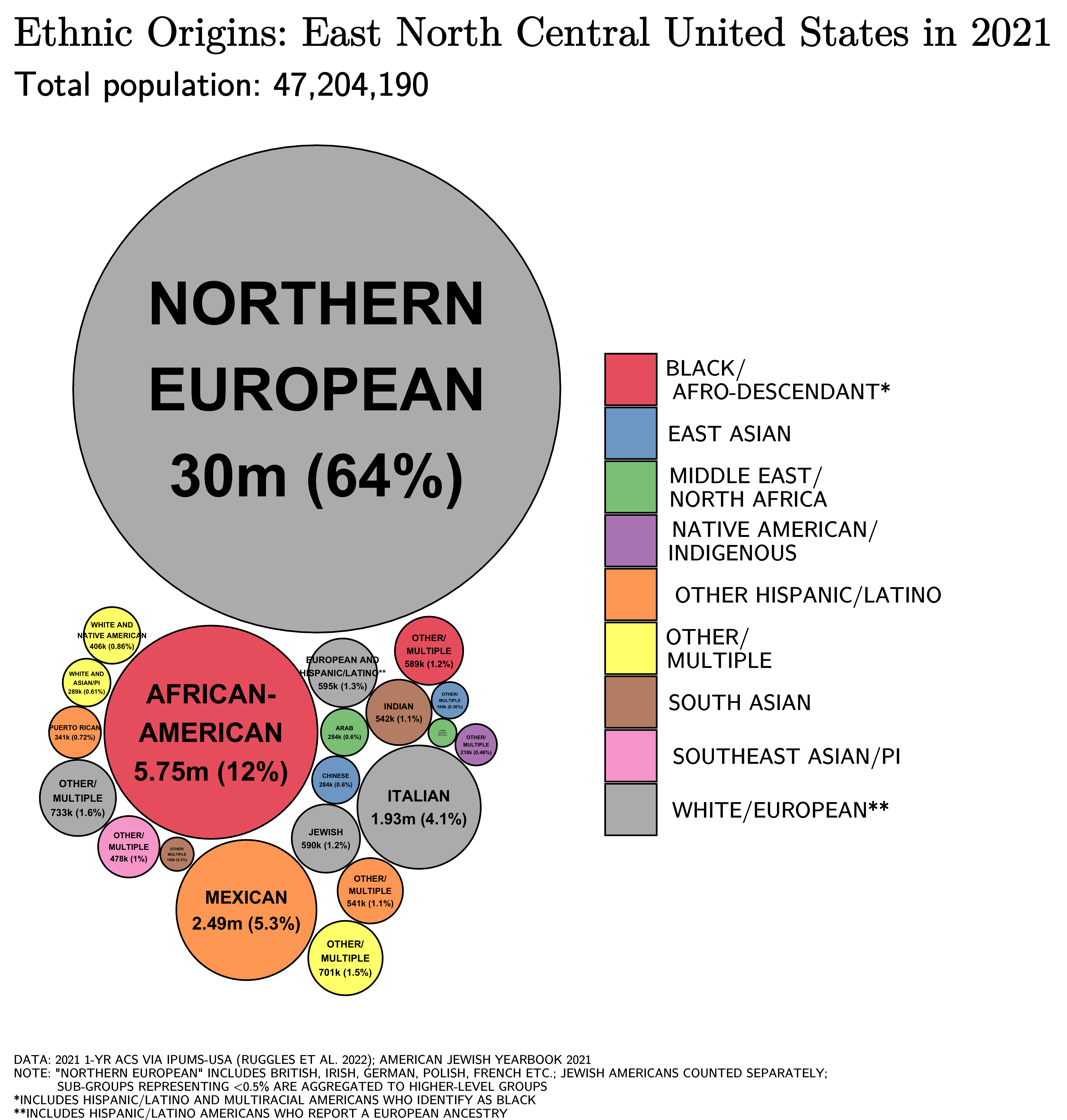
Ethnic origins in East North Central

The East North Central states is a region of the United States defined by the U.S. Census Bureau, containing five states: Illinois, Indiana, Michigan, Ohio and Wisconsin. These states border the Great Lakes, West North Central, the Southeastern, and Northeastern states; the Eastern North Central states also share a land border with Canada through Michigan's Upper Peninsula, southeastern, and mid-Michigan regions. As one of two subregional divisions used to categorize the Midwestern United States, East North Central closely matches the area of the Northwest Territory, excluding a portion of Minnesota.

The East North Central states also form a large part of the Great Lakes region, although the latter also includes Minnesota, New York, Pennsylvania and the Canadian province of Ontario. It has a low rate of population growth and the estimated population as of 2019 was 46,902,431, though the 2020 census numbered 47,368,533 residents. The Great Lakes bordering the area provide access to the Atlantic Ocean via the Great Lakes Waterway and St. Lawrence Seaway, or by the Erie Canal and the Hudson River, or via the Gulf of Mexico from the Mississippi River and the Illinois Waterway. Chicago and Detroit—two of East North Central's largest cities—are among the major ports of the United States.

Culturally, this region of the U.S. has been historically influenced by the British and French; Anglo-American culture permeated states covering the region following the expansion of the United States. Religiously, the East North Central states have been and remain predominantly affiliated with Christianity. Altogether, the five states are majority Catholic, non- and inter-denominational, Methodist, Lutheran, and Baptist. In the 21st century, Islam has emerged as the largest non-Christian religion in the region.

== History ==
East North Central United States in 1908 from The Harmsworth atlas and Gazetter

During European colonization of the Americas, the modern-day East North Central states was occupied by numerous American Indian tribes; with the introduction of European Americans into the region, it was divided between the British colonial empire in America and New France. The western portion of this region formed part of French Louisiana, and following U.S. independence, the eastern half was ceded to the United States from Great Britain. Since American settlement, the modern-day East North Central states has remained the most populous division of the Midwest despite the overall region's low population growth rates.

== Geography ==
Geographically located within the North, East North Central is considered part of the Midwest and Great Lakes regions, sharing maritime and land borders with Canada. As half of the Midwest, the majority of it shares a humid continental climate, and many of its coastal settlements encounter lake effect snow during the winter.

States in the East North Central region
State	2019 estimate	Land area
Illinois	12,671,821	57,915
Indiana	6,732,219	36,418
Michigan	9,986,857	96,716
Ohio	11,689,100	44,825
Wisconsin	5,822,434	65,497

== Demographics ==
In 2010, the East North Central states had a population of 46,421,564; this grew to an estimated 46,902,431 by 2019. By the 2020 United States census, the region's population increased to 47,368,533. Of its population, Illinois is the region's most populous with a 2020 population of 12,812,508. Its least populous is Wisconsin, with 5,893,718 residents. Chicago is the region's most populous city and largest metropolitan area. According to the 2010 American Community Survey, 49.1% of the residents were male and 50.9% were female. Approximately 24.0% of the population were under 18 years of age, and 13.4% were over 65 years of age, and the median age for the region was 39.2.

In terms of race and ethnicity as of 2012, White Americans made up 79.5% of the population, of which 75.7% were whites of non-Hispanic origin. Black Americans composed 12.1% of the region's population, of which 11.9% were blacks of non-Hispanic origin. American Indians and Alaskan Natives were 0.4% of the population and Asians were 2.7%. People who were of two or more races formed 2.1% of the population; and Hispanics and Latinos of any race made up 7.6%.

Linguistically, English is, by far, the most common language spoken at home. Approximately 89.3% of all residents (38.3 million people) over the age of five spoke only English at home. Roughly 2,516,000 people (5.9% of the population) spoke Spanish at home and roughly 2,016,000 people (5.8% of the population) spoke another languages at home. Around 270,000 (0.6%) spoke German at home, although this figure ranges from 2% to 37% in Northeast Ohio, which is home to a large Amish community.

Largest cities by population
	City	2019 pop.
1	Chicago, Illinois	2,693,976
2	Columbus, Ohio	898,553
3	Indianapolis, Indiana	876,384
4	Detroit, Michigan	670,031
5	Milwaukee, Wisconsin	590,157
6	Cleveland, Ohio	381,009
7	Cincinnati, Ohio	303,940
8	Toledo, Ohio	272,779
9	Fort Wayne, Indiana	270,402
10	Madison, Wisconsin	259,680

Largest metropolitan areas by population
	MSA	2019 pop.
1	Chicago-Naperville-Elgin, IL-IN-WI MSA	9,458,539
2	Detroit-Warren-Dearborn, MI MSA	4,319,629
3	Cincinnati, OH-KY-IN MSA	2,221,208
4	Columbus, OH MSA	2,122,271
5	Indianapolis-Carmel-Anderson, IN MSA	2,074,537
6	Cleveland-Elyria, OH MSA	2,048,449
7	Milwaukee-Waukesha, WI MSA	1,575,179
8	Grand Rapids-Kentwood, MI MSA	1,077,370
9	Dayton-Kettering, OH MSA	807,611
10	Akron, OH MSA	703,479

== Politics ==
Parties
Democratic-Republican	Democratic	Whig	Republican	Progressive

2020 United States Presidential Election Results in East North Central
Party	Total voters	Percentage
Joe Biden (D)	11,828,484	49.8%
Donald Trump (R)	11,591,618	48.8%
Jo Jorgensen (L)	291,885	1.2%
Total	23,711,987	100%

There are also two deregistered parties that have active executive committees.

The Greens
Libertarian

- **Bold** denotes election winner.

Presidential electoral votes in the East North Central states since 1804
Year	Illinois	Indiana	Michigan	Ohio	Wisconsin
1804	No election	No election	No election	**Jefferson**	No election
1808	No election	No election	No election	**Madison**	No election
1812	No election	No election	No election	**Madison**	No election
1816	No election	**Monroe**	No election	**Monroe**	No election
1820	**Monroe**	**Monroe**	No election	**Monroe**	No election
1824	Jackson	Jackson	No election	Clay	No election
1828	**Jackson**	**Jackson**	No election	**Jackson**	No election
1832	**Jackson**	**Jackson**	No election	**Jackson**	No election
1836	**Van Buren**	Harrison	**Van Buren**	Harrison	No election
1840	Van Buren	**Harrison**	**Harrison**	**Harrison**	No election
1844	**Polk**	**Polk**	**Polk**	Clay	No election
1848	Cass	Cass	Cass	Cass	Cass
1852	**Pierce**	**Pierce**	**Pierce**	**Pierce**	**Pierce**
1856	**Buchanan**	**Buchanan**	Frémont	Frémont	Frémont
1860	**Lincoln**	**Lincoln**	**Lincoln**	**Lincoln**	**Lincoln**
1864	**Lincoln**	**Lincoln**	**Lincoln**	**Lincoln**	**Lincoln**
1868	**Grant**	**Grant**	**Grant**	**Grant**	**Grant**
1872	**Grant**	**Grant**	**Grant**	**Grant**	**Grant**
1876	**Hayes**	Tilden	**Hayes**	**Hayes**	**Hayes**
1880	**Garfield**	**Garfield**	**Garfield**	**Garfield**	**Garfield**
1884	Blaine	**Cleveland**	Blaine	Blaine	Blaine
1888	**Harrison**	**Harrison**	**Harrison**	**Harrison**	**Harrison**
1892	**Cleveland**	**Cleveland**	Harrison	Harrison	**Cleveland**
1896	**McKinley**	**McKinley**	**McKinley**	**McKinley**	**McKinley**
1900	**McKinley**	**McKinley**	**McKinley**	**McKinley**	**McKinley**
1904	**Roosevelt**	**Roosevelt**	**Roosevelt**	**Roosevelt**	**Roosevelt**
1908	**Taft**	**Taft**	**Taft**	**Taft**	**Taft**
1912	**Wilson**	**Wilson**	Roosevelt	**Wilson**	**Wilson**
1916	Hughes	Hughes	Hughes	**Wilson**	Hughes
1920	**Harding**	**Harding**	**Harding**	**Harding**	**Harding**
1924	**Coolidge**	**Coolidge**	**Coolidge**	**Coolidge**	La Follette
1928	**Hoover**	**Hoover**	**Hoover**	**Hoover**	**Hoover**
1932	**Roosevelt**	**Roosevelt**	**Roosevelt**	**Roosevelt**	**Roosevelt**
1936	**Roosevelt**	**Roosevelt**	**Roosevelt**	**Roosevelt**	**Roosevelt**
1940	**Roosevelt**	Willkie	Willkie	**Roosevelt**	**Roosevelt**
1944	**Roosevelt**	Dewey	**Roosevelt**	Dewey	Dewey
1948	**Truman**	Dewey	Dewey	**Truman**	**Truman**
1952	**Eisenhower**	**Eisenhower**	**Eisenhower**	**Eisenhower**	**Eisenhower**
1956	**Eisenhower**	**Eisenhower**	**Eisenhower**	**Eisenhower**	**Eisenhower**
1960	**Kennedy**	Nixon	**Kennedy**	Nixon	Nixon
1964	**Johnson**	**Johnson**	**Johnson**	**Johnson**	**Johnson**
1968	**Nixon**	**Nixon**	Humphrey	**Nixon**	**Nixon**
1972	**Nixon**	**Nixon**	**Nixon**	**Nixon**	**Nixon**
1976	Ford	Ford	Ford	**Carter**	**Carter**
1980	**Reagan**	**Reagan**	**Reagan**	**Reagan**	**Reagan**
1984	**Reagan**	**Reagan**	**Reagan**	**Reagan**	**Reagan**
1988	**Bush**	**Bush**	**Bush**	**Bush**	Dukakis
1992	**Clinton**	Bush	**Clinton**	**Clinton**	**Clinton**
1996	**Clinton**	Dole	**Clinton**	**Clinton**	**Clinton**
2000	Gore	**Bush**	Gore	**Bush**	Gore
2004	Kerry	**Bush**	Kerry	**Bush**	Kerry
2008	**Obama**	**Obama**	**Obama**	**Obama**	**Obama**
2012	**Obama**	Romney	**Obama**	**Obama**	**Obama**
2016	Clinton	**Trump**	**Trump**	**Trump**	**Trump**
2020	**Biden**	Trump	**Biden**	Trump	**Biden**
2024	Harris	**Trump**	**Trump**	**Trump**	**Trump**
Year	Illinois	Indiana	Michigan	Ohio	Wisconsin

== See also ==
- Great Lakes
- Great Lakes Region
