= Eastern Ridges and Lowlands =

Geographical region of Wisconsin

Coordinates: 43°40′N 88°30′W

The geographical regions of Wisconsin

The Eastern Ridges and Lowlands is a geographical region in the eastern part of the U.S. state of Wisconsin, between Green Bay in the north, and the border with Illinois in the south. Lake Michigan lies to the east of the region.

The Eastern Ridges and Lowlands region is primarily a plain with elevations between 700 and 900 feet above sea level, but the region slopes to form two broad ridges running from north to south that exceed 1,000 feet above sea level in some places. One ridge runs along Lake Michigan from the Door Peninsula to the Illinois border. The other ridge is on the western edge of the region, stretching from Marinette County in the north to Dane County. Between the two ridges is a lowland carved out by the glaciers of the last ice age. The lowland includes the Green Bay, Lake Winnebago, and several other small rivers and lakes. While there are some escarpments along the ridges, the region is primarily flat and the changes in elevation are usually gradual. The flatness of the Eastern Ridges and Lowlands region makes it especially suitable for agriculture. The majority of the region is covered by farmland. Forests are scarce except for in the far northern part of the region. Besides farmland, the area includes a significant amount of urban and suburban development, and a large proportion of Wisconsin's population. Many of Wisconsin's largest cities are located in the Eastern Ridges and Lowlands region, including Milwaukee, Madison, Green Bay, Kenosha, Racine, Appleton, Sheboygan, and others. The abundance of cities in the area make it Wisconsin's most populous region. The largest city in this region is Milwaukee with a population of 592,025 (2018).

== Counties and Cities in the Eastern Ridges and Lowlands region ==
Part or all of the land in the following counties is included in the Eastern Ridges and Lowlands region:

- Brown County
- Calumet County
- Columbia County
- Dane County
- Dodge County
- Door County
- Fond du Lac County
- Green Lake County
- Jefferson County
- Kenosha County
- Kewaunee County
- Manitowoc County
- Marinette County
- Milwaukee County
- Oconto County
- Outagamie County
- Ozaukee County
- Racine County
- Rock County
- Shawano County
- Sheboygan County
- Walworth County
- Washington County
- Waukesha County
- Winnebago County

=== Selected Cities in Eastern Ridges and Lowlands region ===
==== In Southeastern and South Central Wisconsin ====
- Milwaukee
- Waukesha
- Madison
- Janesville
- Port Washington
- Kenosha

==== In Northeastern and East Central Wisconsin ====
- Green Bay
- Appleton
- Oshkosh
- Fond du Lac
- Manitowoc
- Sturgeon Bay
