= Lake Superior Lowland =

Geographical region of Wisconsin

Coordinates: 46°40′N 91°30′W

The geographical regions of Wisconsin

In the U.S. state of Wisconsin, the Lake Superior Lowland, also known as the Superior Coastal Plain, is a geographical region located in the far northern part of the state bordering Lake Superior. It covers about 1,250 square miles (3,200 km^{2}), and does not extend beyond 20 miles (32 km) from the Lake Superior shore.

The Lake Superior Lowland is defined by a plain that slopes gently downward towards the north. While the area is mostly flat, the altitude ranges from about 600 feet (180 m) to 1000 feet (or 300 meters) above sea level. The higher altitudes are located on the Bayfield Peninsula, where the characteristic plain gives way to more rugged hills. Northeast of the peninsula are the Apostle Islands, which have been designated as a National Lakeshore.

Woodland covers most of the Lake Superior Lowland. Much of the forested area is dominated by aspen and birch trees, with some conifers interspersed throughout the forest. Some pasture and cropland has been established on the plain. Marshes and wetlands exist in a few places in the region, and several rivers drain the region into Lake Superior, including the Brule River, which is surrounded by a State Forest. Two Ojibwa Indian reservations are located along the shores of Lake Superior, the Bad River Indian Reservation and the Red Cliff Indian Reservation. The largest city in the area is Superior, Wisconsin. Other cities include Ashland and Washburn.

This is part of a northern Wisconsin area colloquially referred to as "up north."

== Counties in the Lake Superior Lowland ==
Part of the land of the following counties is included in the Lake Superior Coastal Plain:

- Ashland County
- Bayfield County
- Douglas County
- Iron County
