= Cuisine of Wisconsin =

Food and drinks from Wisconsin

"Cheesehead" fans of the Green Bay Packers with bratwursts

The cuisine of Wisconsin is a type of Midwestern cuisine found throughout the state of Wisconsin in the United States. Known as "America's Dairyland", Wisconsin is famous for its cheese as well as other dairy products, such as cheese curds and frozen custard. Other notable foods common to the region include bratwursts, beer, brandy Old Fashioned cocktails, butter burgers, fish fries and fish boils, cranberries, and booyah stew.

== Dairy ==
=== Cheese and cheese products ===
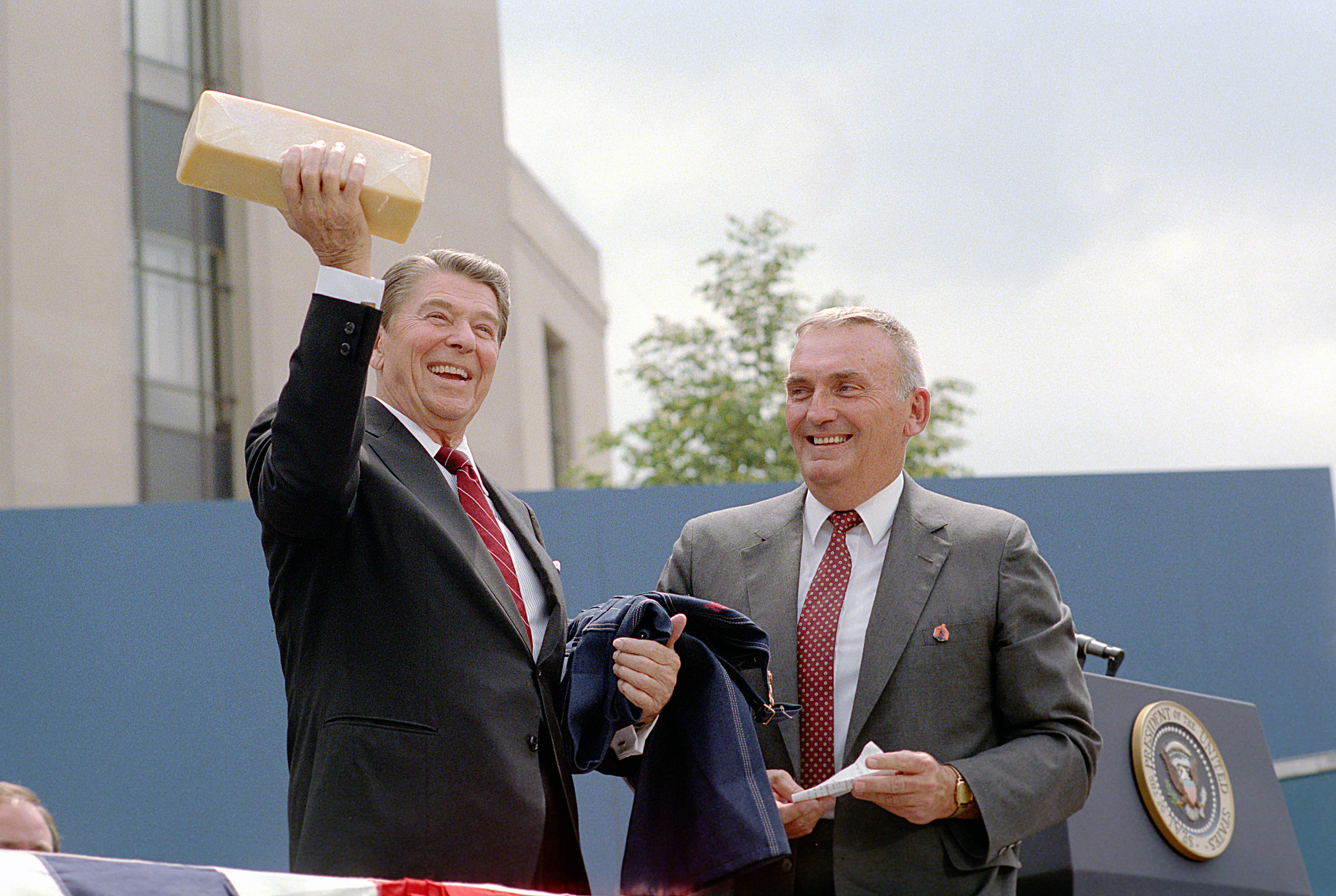
U.S. president Ronald Reagan holding a block of Wisconsin cheese while visiting Wisconsin in 1985

The state is well known as a home to many cheesemakers. Currently, Wisconsin has 58 Master Cheesemakers, who are all qualified through an extensive process set by the Wisconsin Milk Marketing Board. The program is the only one of its kind outside of Europe. Wisconsin cheesemaking is diverse, ranging from artisans who hand-craft their product from the milk of their own dairy herds to large factories.

Colby cheese was first created in Wisconsin in 1885 (named after the town it came from), and Brick cheese was first created in the state in 1877. The state has also played origin to Blue Marble Jack cheese, and is the only producer of Limburger cheese in the United States.

Cheese curds can be eaten separately "squeaky," meaning cold, as a snack, or covered in batter and fried as an appetizer, often served with ranch dressing as a dipping sauce.

Hot and spicy cheese bread is a popular type of bread created and sold in Madison, Wisconsin from Stella's Bakery.

=== Ice cream and frozen custard ===
Blue moon ice cream is a flavor popular in the Upper Midwest of the United States, including Wisconsin. The Chicago Tribune described the ice cream as "Smurf-blue, marshmallow-sweet".

At the University of Wisconsin–Madison, Babcock Dairy Plant and Store produces and sells ice cream, milk, and cheese products on campus.

=== Dairy science and industry ===
Malted milk was invented by James Horlick in Racine in the early 1870s. The Babcock Butterfat Test, now standard in the industry, was defined by Dr. Steven Babcock at the University of Wisconsin-Madison in 1890.

== Alcohol ==
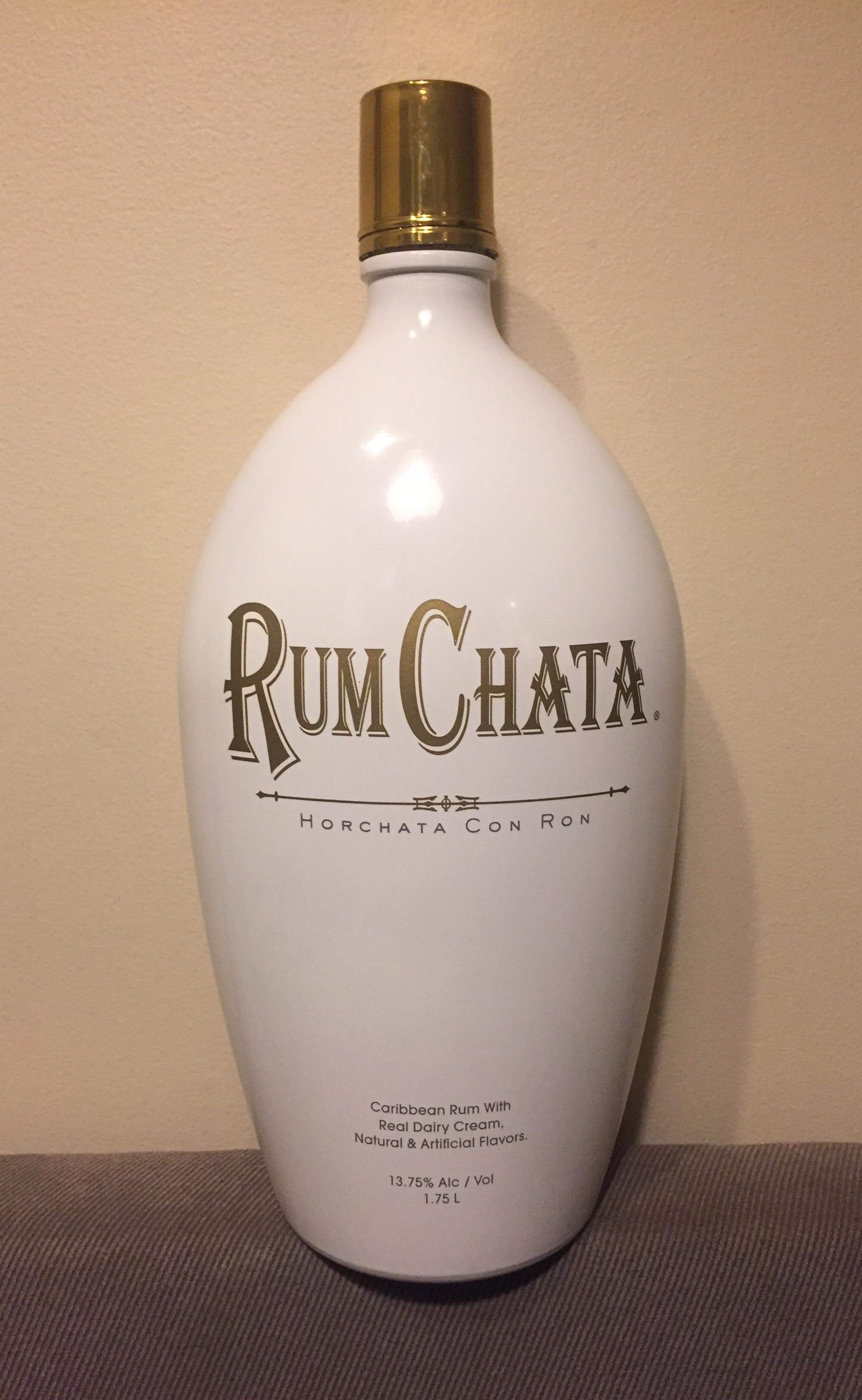
RumChata was invented in Pewaukee, Wisconsin

=== Beer ===
Besides its "cheesehead" status, Wisconsin has a reputation for alcohol consumption. Common traits of "drinking culture" are embedded in Wisconsin traditions, from festivals and holidays to everyday life. Many large breweries were founded in Wisconsin, largely in Milwaukee, which gained the epithet "Brew City" before the turn of the century. Miller Brewing Company, Pabst Brewing Company, Joseph Schlitz Brewing Company (all from and originally based in Milwaukee) and Jacob Leinenkugel Brewing Company all began as local businesses before entering the national and international markets.

Wisconsin has experienced a resurgence in this industry, however, with numerous microbreweries and craft beers now being created and exported. Several other favorites include Ale Asylum, Capital, Sprecher, and New Glarus, the latter being well known for the Spotted Cow Farmhouse Ale. New Glarus is also known for refusing to sell their liquor outside of Wisconsin, which was originally to meet demand but has since become a marketing tactic.

Cooking with beer is also common across the state. Wisconsinites boil or braise their sausages (especially bratwursts) in several types of beer (most often a Pilsner) with butter and onions, and beer batter fish, typically walleye or perch. Beer-battered cheese curds and onion rings are also typical fare.

Beer cheese soup is usually made from a variety of beer and a sharp cheddar or more mild colby cheese, with sausage, potatoes, and green onions.

Another recipe involving alcohol is "beer butt" or "beer can" chicken (similar to drunken chicken), a meal involving a whole chicken slow-roasted, typically over a fire, with a can of usually amber beer directly inserted into the poultry's cavity.

=== Other ===
Besides beer, Wisconsinites also drink large quantities of brandy, often mixed into the unique Badger libation, the "brandy Old Fashioned," which can be sweet, sour, or press. Another though considerably more recent brandy-based cocktail is the Wisconsin Badger, derived from a mix of brandy, cranberry juice, and cherry schnapps.

Pewaukee, Wisconsin is also home to the alcoholic beverage RumChata, described as an horchata recipe containing the primary ingredients of rum and Wisconsin cream.

The bloody Mary has long been popular in Wisconsin, traditionally served with a 5-ounce "sidecar" or "pony" of beer. The 2000s-2010s U.S. trend of extravagant and meal-sized bloody Mary garnishes, including cheese curds, large portions of bacon, entire fried chickens, and other similar toppings, originated at Sobelman's Bar on the Near West Side of Milwaukee and spread through social media.

== Bratwurst and sausage ==
According to Jesse Brookstein, author of Best of the Wurst, though there is German influence in the sausage-making industry in Wisconsin, many other cultures from the Native Americans to the Swedish have contributed to the state’s history of sausage-making. An early form of sausage, pemmican (pounded bison meat combined with wild rice, corn, berries, and herbs), was being made by Native Americans in Wisconsin around 4000 BCE. According to Terese Allen, a food columnist for Edible Madison, the lush Wisconsin landscape consisting of prairies and woodlands was ideal for supplying these hunted and gathered food items. During the 19th century, Wisconsin received immigrants from countries across Europe such as Germany, Poland, and Bohemia. European settlers benefitted from these same resources which helped them domesticate animals and led to the growth of farms and livestock. Coming with their old-world recipes, these European immigrants began opening butcher shops and introducing their own traditional food items such as Bavarian bratwurst and Bohemian jaternice. While Germans have influenced the sausage industry, Jesse Brookstein states that none of "the first three major meat barons, Cudahy, Layton, and Plankinton, had German last names".

In the following years, Wisconsin welcomed additional cultural influences such as the Italian soppressata, Mexican chorizo, Albanian cevapi, and more, all contributing to the growth in expertise and variety in the sausage industry. However, the bratwurst surpassed all the diverse varieties of sausages becoming iconic in the state, according to Terese Allen. The cultural impact of bratwurst and sausage in Wisconsin is highlighted by the way it has influenced social gatherings, traditions, and hunting. Wisconsinites will grill beer-soaked brats at Green Bay Packers tailgates and community gatherings. Traditions include the sausage race during the middle of the sixth inning at Milwaukee Brewers home games, where six sausage mascots race on the field. Finally, on the day before rifle season opens, butcher shops are packed with hunters loading up on brats and summer sausage for the week ahead.

== Fish fries and fish boils ==
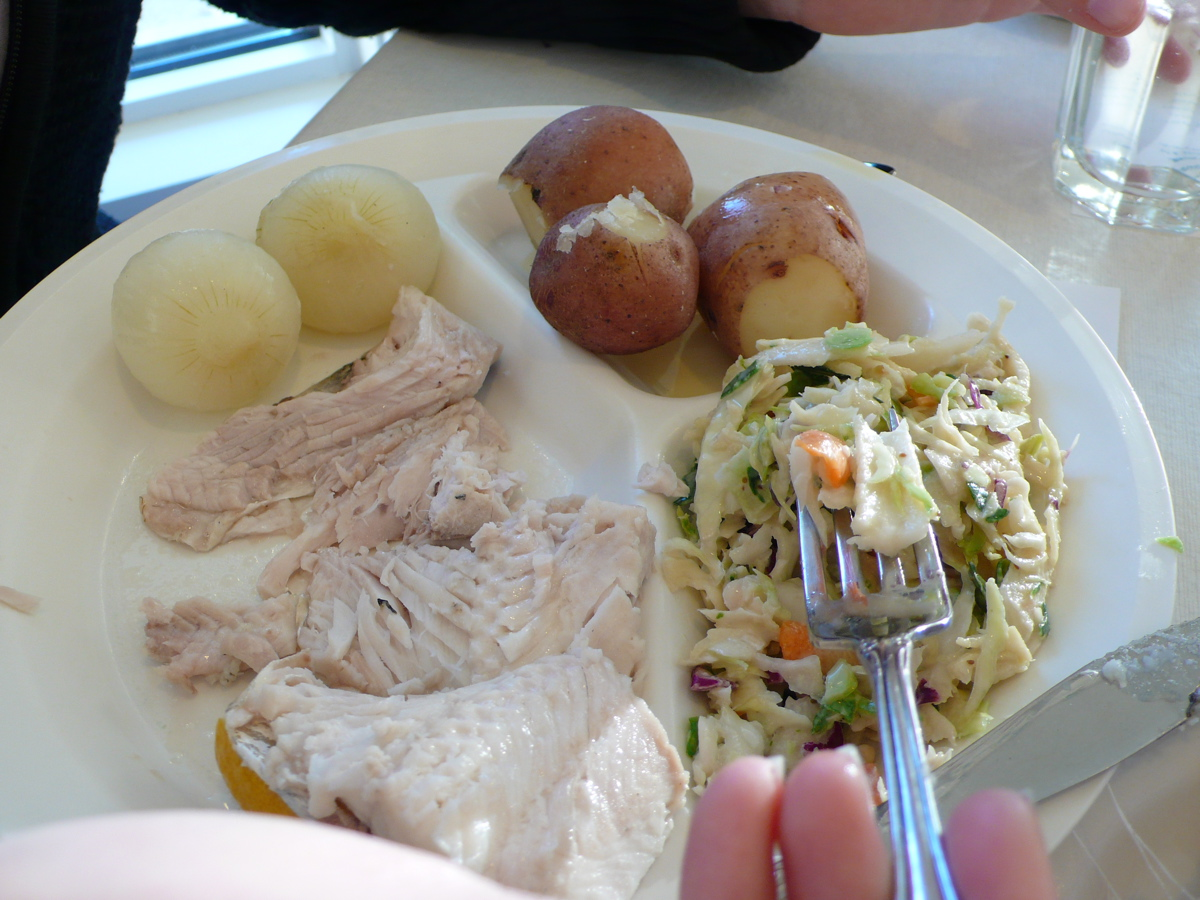
Platter of fish boil, which is traditionally served in Door County

Friday night fish fries are ubiquitous throughout Wisconsin, with beer-battered and deep fried perch or walleye being the main entrees. Supper clubs are a part of Wisconsin's culinary heritage, including fish fries on Friday evenings. Some of the more traditional sides served are: french fries, potato pancakes with applesauce, creamy or vingar-based cole slaw, along with lemon wedges. It's also not uncommon to be served a single slice of marbled rye bread, in addition to fries or pancakes.

Fish boils began in the fishing and logging industries out of necessity to feed as many people as possible, but have now become a cultural phenomenon throughout the state. Originating in Door County, fish boils are a longstanding tradition consisting of boiling fresh caught whitefish from Lake Michigan with potatoes in a large pot over an open fire. During the late 1800s-1900s, fishermen living in remote camps throughout the Great Lakes would dock their boats, clean their catch, and toss fish into a large pot of boiling water to feed the whole crew. Lumberjacks working in Door County later joined in on this meal. Now, it has become a tourist attraction with many restaurants and inns along the peninsula offering multiple seatings a night during summer, with some even going year-round. Guests gather to watch the moment when the kerosene is tossed on the fire, creating a fireball which causes a boil over. The Viking Grill and the White Gull Inn became some of the first establishments to serve fish boils to the public. After the fish boil, guests will dine back in the restaurant, with a typical plate consisting of the fish finished with lemon and butter, potatoes, coleslaw using locally grown cabbage, homemade rye bread, and cherry pie with Door County cherries.

== Booyah ==
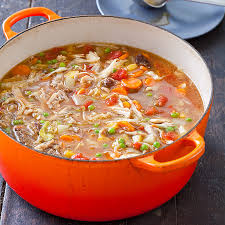
Booyah seasoned with peas, granulated vegetables and chicken

Booyah stew is another common Wisconsin meal, found especially in the Northeast region of the state. The origins of this dish are disputed, but the Wisconsin origin contends that the word is a vernacular Flemish or Walloon Belgian spelling of the French word bouillon, in this context meaning "broth." The recipient was likely brought to Wisconsin by Walloons that settled in the region. Recipes vary but common ingredients usually involve chicken or other meats—beef, pork, or ox tail are most often used—as well as a mirepoix of vegetables, commonly onion, celery, carrots, cabbage, peas, potatoes, and rutabaga. The ingredients are all cooked together in a special kind of large, cast-iron kettle often known as a "booyah kettle," over low heat for several days.

== Wild rice ==
Wild rice was a staple crop for the Menominee and Ojibwe tribes of Wisconsin, who developed harvesting and processing methods and practiced spiritual rituals to honor the spirits and ensure successful harvests. Because of the importance of wild rice to the Menominee tribe specifically, they became known as the Wild Rice people. They believed that wild rice was a gift from one of the spirits, and sacrifices must be made to ensure a good harvest.

The rice was traditionally harvested by a woman sitting in the front of the canoe using a cedar stick to pull bunches of rice over the side of the canoe and knocking the grain into the bottom of the boat. A man typically propelled the canoe by using a long, forked tree branch to push and steer the canoe through the water. After the rice was harvested, they would prepare, bless, and eat a small portion of the rice as a ritual offering to give thanks to the spirits.

This tradition continues today with each family giving thanks when they eat the first of the new rice harvest. For several weeks, friends and relatives would get together on the lake shore dancing and drumming at night after harvesting and processing rice during the day. Today, most rice fields are owned by the federal government but families will still go back to their fields given to them by their tribal chiefs.

== Dessert ==
A popular Wisconsin dessert is the cream puff, a type of profiterole that is a famous treat at the Wisconsin State Fair.

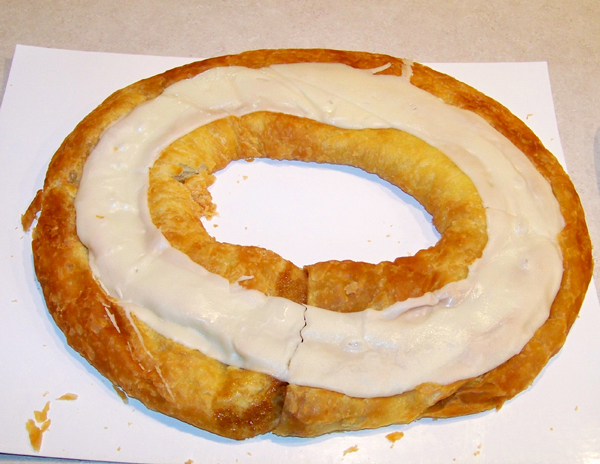
Kringle, the official state pastry

A fudge-bottom pie is still served and sold at the University of Wisconsin–Madison. The recipe has been alternatively attributed to Chef Carson Gulley from UW Dining, and Chefs Lewis Marston and Maurice Coombs from the Memorial Union. Partially on the strength of this and other recipes, Gulley and his wife Beatrice became known in 1953 for having been some of the first Black Americans to host a cooking show on television, and the first Black Americans to host a television show of any kind in Wisconsin.

The southeastern Wisconsin city of Racine is known for Kringle, a sweet, flaky, pastry that was brought by Danish immigrants who came to the region in the 1840s. The Kringle became the official pastry of the State of Wisconsin on June 30, 2013.

Schaum Torte is a type of pavlova served in southeastern Wisconsin, especially during the summer when fresh strawberries are in season. The dessert's light, airy nature is also well-suited to southeast Wisconsin summers that can be hot and humid.

A set of three triangle-shaped tin pans that are unique to Mayville, Wisconsin are used for making carrot cakes and potato tortes. These cakes and tortes were especially common at church bake sales, likely due to being able to bake three cakes simultaneously.

Candy Raisins are a soft jujube candy unique to Milwaukee, Wisconsin that date back to the 1930s. The candy has been periodically discontinued but are still being produced in a most recent revival.

== Other ==
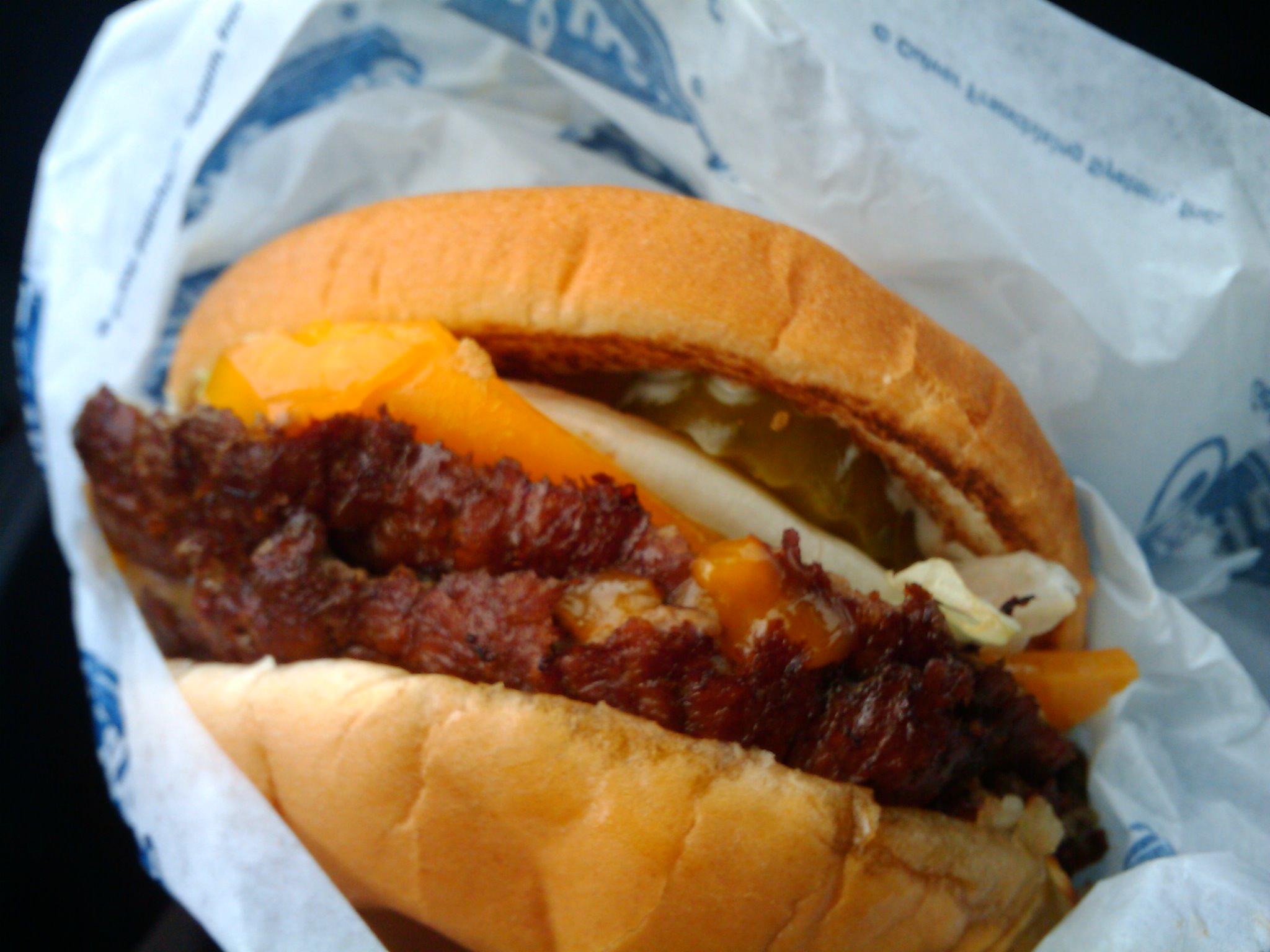
Culver's butter burger

Wisconsin is the leading producer of cranberries in the United States, which is also the state's official fruit.

Culver's is a fast casual food restaurant chain originally from Sauk City, Wisconsin and currently headquartered in Prairie du Sac, Wisconsin. They are known for serving several Wisconsin type items suchs as butter burgers, fish fry dinners, fried cheese curds, and frozen custard.

Dane County Farmers' Market in Madison is the largest producers-only farmer's market in the nation.

The Cornish Pasty is considered a favorite food among Wisconsinites, particularly in the southwestern part of the state. Cornish immigrant miners brought the recipe to Mineral Point in the 1830s, and spread throughout the state from there. Pasties can be found in Wisconsin's largest cities, Madison and Milwaukee, as well as in the far northern region along the border with Michigan's Upper Peninsula, where it is also popular.

The modern-day hamburger is claimed to have been invented in Seymour, Wisconsin in 1885 by "Hamburger" Charlie Nagreen. While others also claim to have invented the hamburger, the butter burger is more likely to have originated in Wisconsin. Solly's Grille in metro Milwaukee and Kroll's Restaurant in Green Bay have both cited 1936 as the year they began serving the sandwich, with the Wisconsin-based Culver's providing an increased popularity of the sandwich through its chain of restaurants.

Tiger Meat or "cannibal sandwiches" are a variation on Zwiebelmett: raw ground beef served open-faced on rye bread, usually topped with sliced raw onion and seasoned with salt and black pepper. The sandwiches are usually served during the winter in southeastern Wisconsin, in particular at Christmas and New Year's Eve parties.

== See also ==
- Cuisine of the Midwestern United States
