= Zatarain's =

American food and spice company

- Company type: Subsidiary
- Industry: Processed & Packaged goods
- Founded: 1889; 137 years ago
- Headquarters: New Orleans, Louisiana, U.S.
- Products: Spices, herbs, flavorings, rice
- Owner: McCormick & Company
- Website: www.zatarains.com

Zatarain's is an American food and spice company based in New Orleans, Louisiana, in the United States that makes a large family of products with seasonings and spices that are part of the cultural cuisine and heritage of Louisiana and New Orleans' Cajun and Creole traditions that includes root beer extract, seasonings, boxed and frozen foods.

The company was started in New Orleans in 1886 and moved to the suburb of Gretna when the family sold the company, in 1963.

It was founded as a grocery by Emile A. Zatarain Sr., in 1886. He created a formulation for root beer that became popular regionally after its introduction at 2:30 p.m. on May 7, 1889, at the Louisiana (Purchase) Exposition under the brand Papoose Root Beer, for which he took out a trademark. He started a new business, Papoose Pure Food Products, built a factory, and began to market it in 1889.

He expanded his product range to include mustard, pickled vegetables, and extracts. Then he moved into the spice business and became known for New Orleans and Cajun-style products.

In 1963 the family sold the business, which has been owned in several different forms in its more than 130-year history. The brand is currently owned by McCormick, the world's largest spice company.

== Products ==
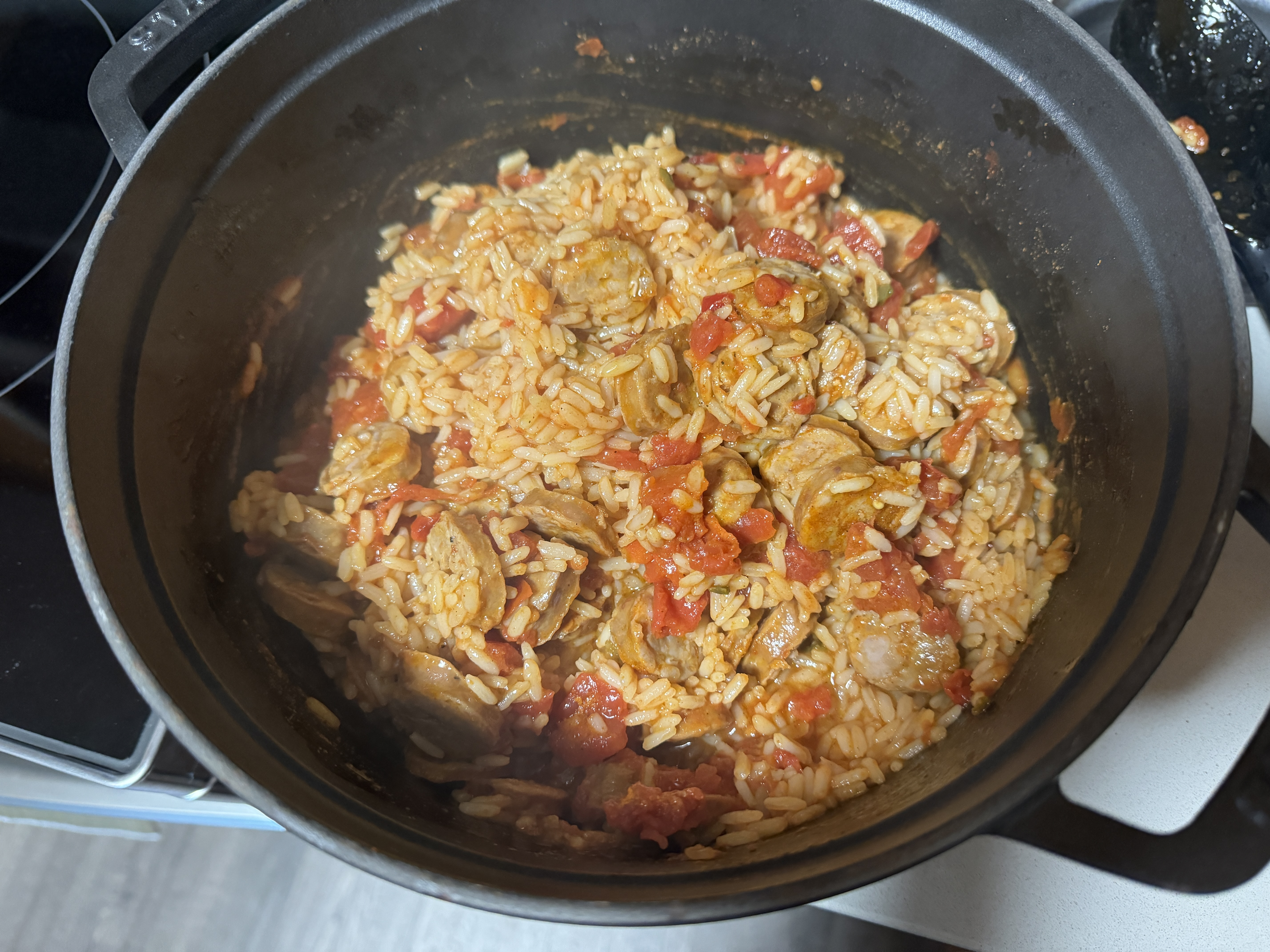
Cooked Zatarain's jambalaya with tomatoes and sausage.

The company produces Cajun and Creole cuisine related food items, in five categories:

- Crab and shrimp boils: these are used to prepare boiled seafood and in hosting the social event known as a seafood boil. The boil is a mesh bag (formerly cheesecloth) containing spices, including mustard seed, coriander seeds, allspice, bay leaf, and black pepper. The company also offers a liquid concentrate crab boil that can be used in lieu of the mesh packets to enhance soups.
- Creole mustard, a common item in New Orleans food, is a stone-ground brown mustard, often referred to as "hot mustard" to differentiate it from standard American yellow mustard.
- Fish-Fri, seasoned cornmeal.
- Ready-to-serve dinners, including gumbo, jambalaya, red beans and rice, and black beans and rice contain precooked beans, rice, and seasonings, to which consumers may optionally add meat. The dinners are available in two forms: frozen, for heating in a microwave oven, or in a package to which water is added before cooking on a stovetop or in a microwave oven.
- Seasonings include cayenne pepper, root-beer extract and mixes and blends similar to the kinds of pre-blended seasonings made popular by Paul Prudhomme and Emeril Lagasse.

The company still manufactures root beer extract for home preparation and brewing.

== History ==
Zatarain's was founded by Emile A. Zatarain, Sr. a merchant and entrepreneur of Basque descent. He had 5 sons, all of whom followed him into his business when they finished school.

In 1886, Zatarain opened a grocery store with the first National Cash Register in Louisiana. A few months later, he bought a horse and buggy to do deliveries. The company's big success, at first, was root beer. According to great-great granddaughter Allison Zatarain, "Emile introduced Papoose Root Beer at 2:30 p.m. on May 7, 1889, at the Louisiana (Purchase) Exposition. The root beer was so successful, that his business grew, and grew, and grew!"

Several years later, Zatarain found that it was more cost effective to sell the root beer blend as an extract. Zatarain formed a company called Papoose Pure Food Products to manufacture the root beer and diversify into other foods and he built a factory at 925 Valmont Street, New Orleans. He began to import and pack olives, pickles and spices.

When the root beer and spice business became more profitable than the grocery store, Zatarain focused on the manufacturing business at Papoose Pure Food Products. His root beer extract sold in barrels to restaurants and markets where it was added to carbonated water.

Seasonings with a Creole or Cajun flair were among the first of Papoose Pure's products expansions. Next they moved into Creole Mustard and pickled products.

On May 29, 1922, as his sons assumed more of the day-to-day operation, Zatarain reincorporated the business as E.A. Zatarain & Sons, Inc. and also did business as Zatarain's Pure Food Products. Emile A. Zatarain, Jr. and his wife Ida May Bennett Zatarain eventually took over the business. Ida May created recipes for their products, like Remoulade Sauce and Olive Salad.

In 1963, the family sold the business to James Grinstead Viavant, founder of the Avondale Shipyards in New Orleans, who had sold his ship building business in 1959. Viavant took over the company, which was using outdated packaging technology, and modernized it.

In 1963, Viavant merged Zatarain's Papoose Products Co., Inc. and another recently-acquired business, Pelican State Lab, owner of a brand of coated fish frying seasoning mix called Fish-Fri, which was brought under the Zatarain's label, and became a best-seller. He dropped bleach, dyes, and pickles and focused on the profit centers at a new plant with modern equipment on a five-acre campus in Gretna, Louisiana, where he turned Zatarain's into a regionally well-known brand by the early 1970s. Fish-Fri became "the entreè" of litigation in 1983. Zatarain's sued Oak Grove Smokehouse for trademark infringement; Oak Grove sold a competitor "Fish Fry." Although the court determined Fish-Fri qualified for protection, Oak Grove's Fish Fry qualified as a fair use. The case opinion is also notable for its use of puns.

With sales now at $10M a year, as Viavant neared retirement, he sold the business to Centra Soya Co. for $24 million in May 1984. Centra increased sales revenues to $14M when it sold Zatarain's to a San Francisco holding company, Wyndham Foods, Inc., 18 months later. Wyndham kept the retail business and expanded the brand into the institutional food business. They rolled out the boxed food products that Zatarains still manufactures, using the term "Cajun" on the boxes to capitalize on the trend in cooking popularized by New Orleans chef Paul Prudhomme in the 1980s. When the fad faded, the company shifted to branding Zatarain's products as "Louisiana-style" or "New Orleans-style".

The company was acquired again in 1987 by a Brentwood, Tennessee company, Martha White Foods, itself a subsidiary of E-II Food Specialties Co., for $35 million. Zatarain's had several more owners over a period of months in the late 1980s, including American Brands of Old Greenwich, Connecticut.

By the 1990s, Zatarain's marketed more than 200 products locally and regionally. It pushed for a national footing with the first national television advertising in 1999.

The company was taken private in a leveraged buyout by Citigroup Venture Capital in 1993 as Zatarain's Partnership LP, a partner group of Citigroup Venture Capital and several Zatarain's employees. The product line was expanded to include frozen foods. It was sold to McCormick on May 9, 2003, for $180M after the company's sales rose 15% annually for the prior five years.

In 2017, the New Orleans Pelicans announced Zatarain's as their jersey patch sponsor.

== See also ==
- List of mustard brands
