= Crayfish party =

Scandinavian tradition linked to crayfish harvest regulations

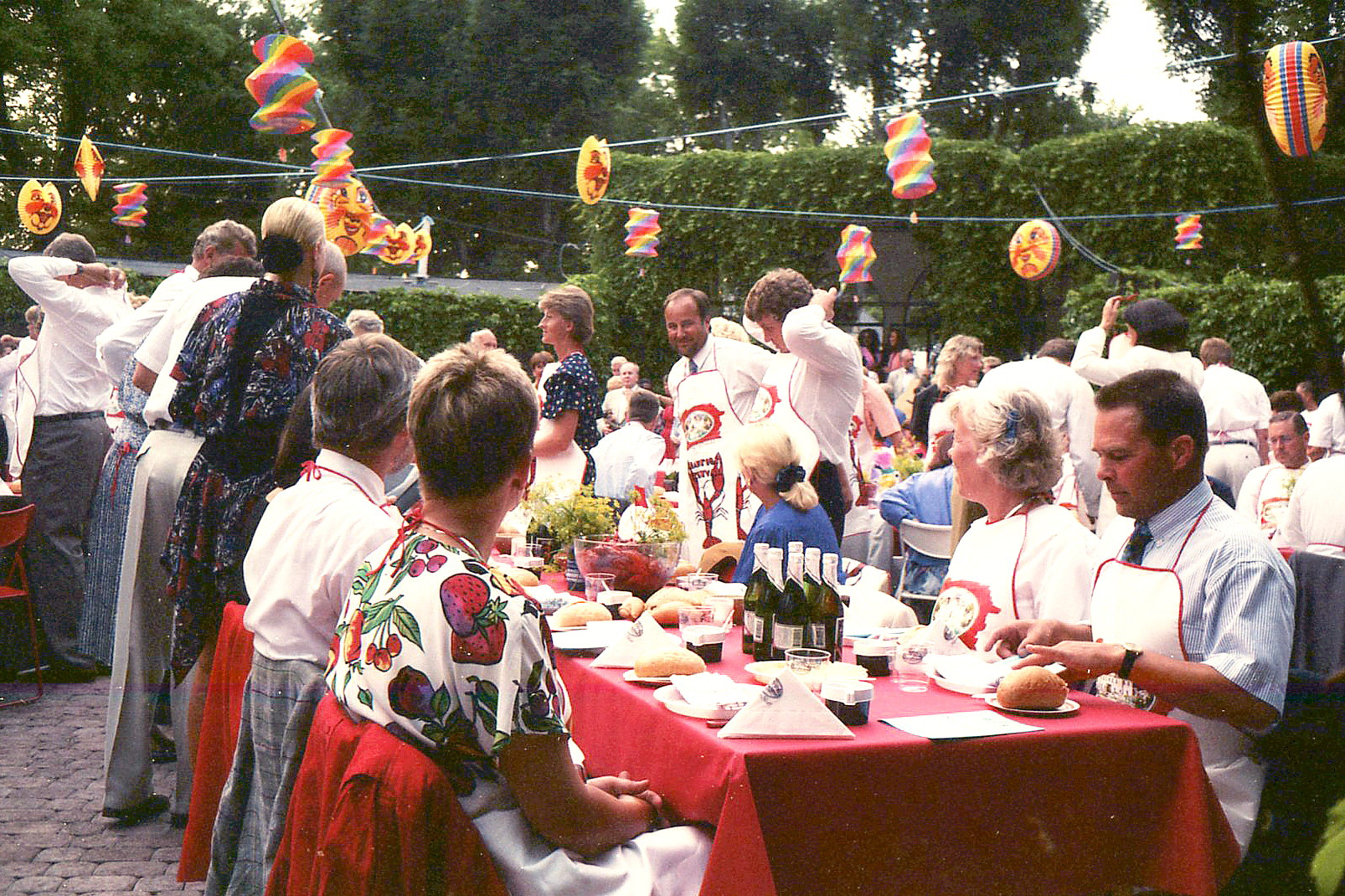
Crayfish party in Häringe slott, Sweden 1991.

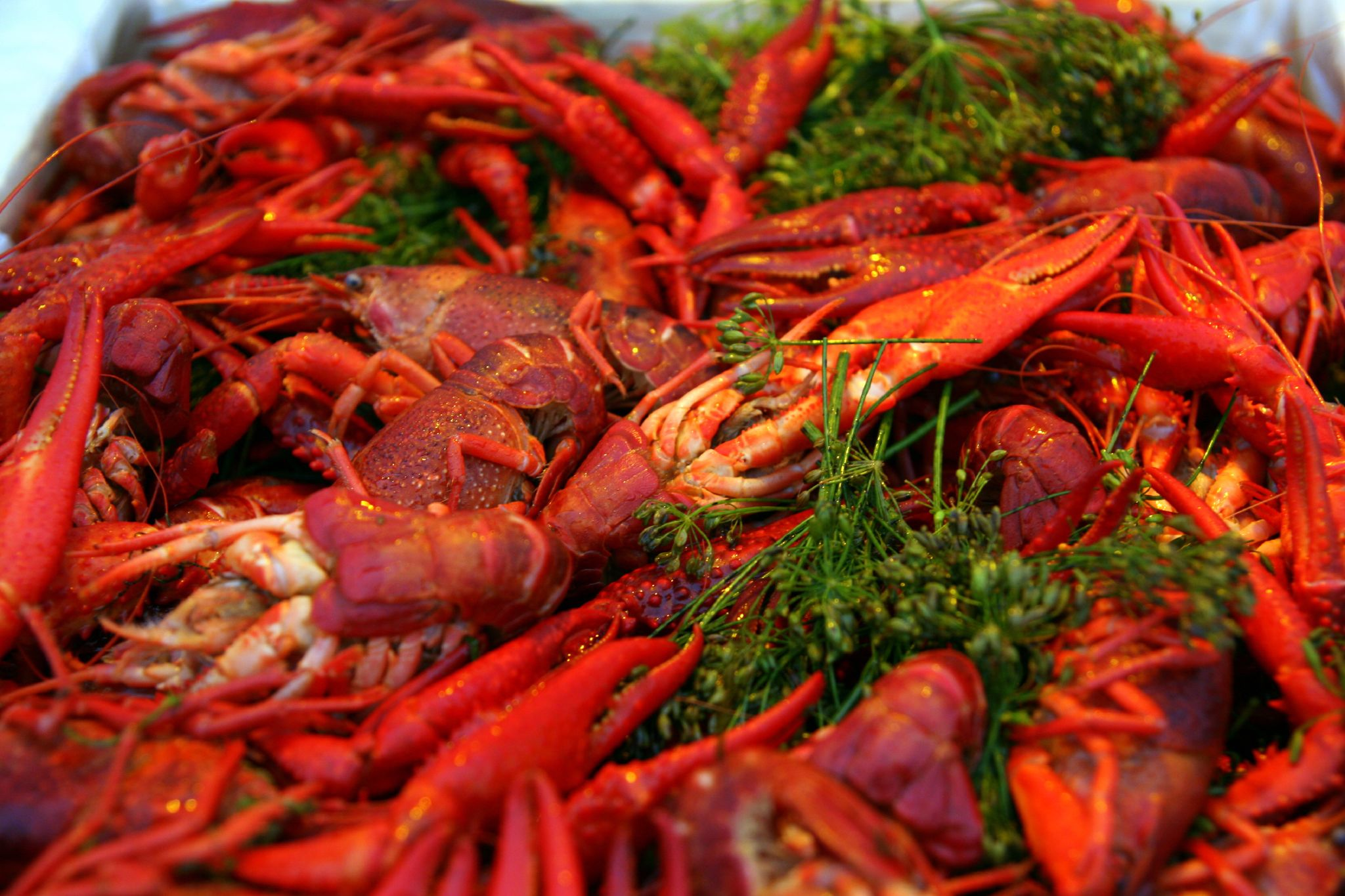
Crayfish cooked with dill in the traditional manner.

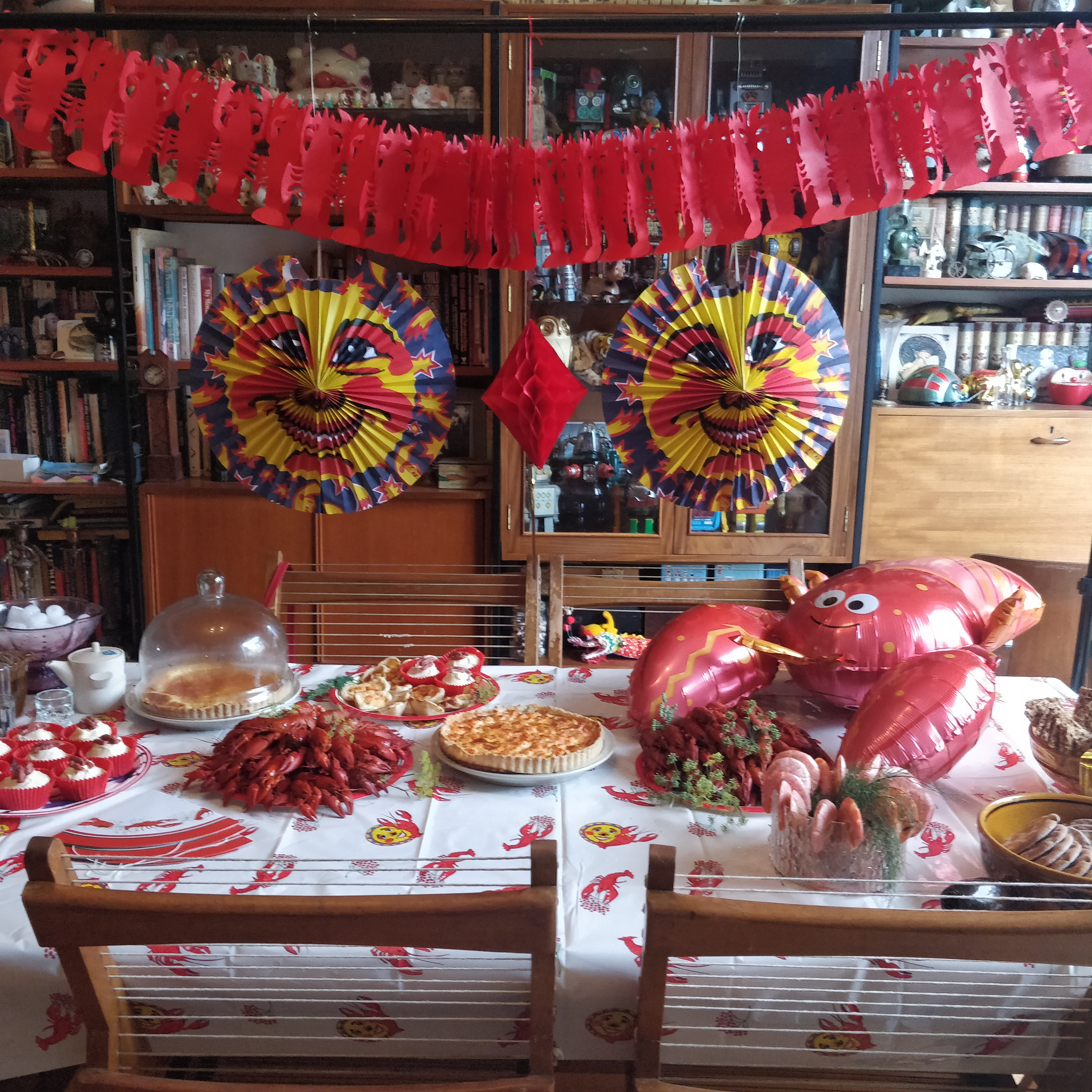
Kräftskiva with traditional decorations and dishes

A crayfish party (Swedish: kräftskiva [ˈkrɛ̂ftˌɧiːva]) is a traditional summertime eating and drinking celebration in the Nordic countries. The tradition, originating in Sweden, has also spread to Finland via its Swedish-speaking population and Norway. A similar tradition exists in the Baltic countries, in particular in Lithuania and Latvia.

Crayfish parties are generally held during August, a tradition that began because the crayfish harvest in Sweden was, for most of the 20th century, legally limited to the late summer. Nowadays, the kräftpremiär date in early August has no legal significance. Customary party accessories are novelty paper hats, paper tablecloths, paper lanterns (often depicting the Man in the Moon), and bibs.

Akvavit and other kinds of snaps are served, as well as beer, and traditional drinking songs (snapsvisa) may be sung. The crayfish are boiled in salt water and seasoned with fresh dill – preferably "crown dill" harvested after the plant has flowered – then served cold and eaten with the fingers. Bread, mushroom pies, strong Västerbotten cheese, salads and other dishes are served buffet-style.

== Spain ==
For more than 40 years, the town of Herrera de Pisuerga (Province of Palencia) has celebrated the Festival Nacional del Cangrejo de río (Crayfish's National Festival). This is because this crustacean has always been part of the traditional gastronomy of the area. Since 2011, the town includes a "Swedish dinner" in its celebrations, during which the residents practice the Swedish tradition of a street dinner with paper lanterns and candles in true kräftskiva-style. For the inaugural Swedish dinner, the festival was honoured by the presence of a special guest, the First Secretary and Chancellor of Spain, Eva Boix.

== See also ==
- Seafood boil
- Smorgasbord
- Fish boil
