= Hot and spicy cheese bread =

Cheese bread from Madison, Wisconsin

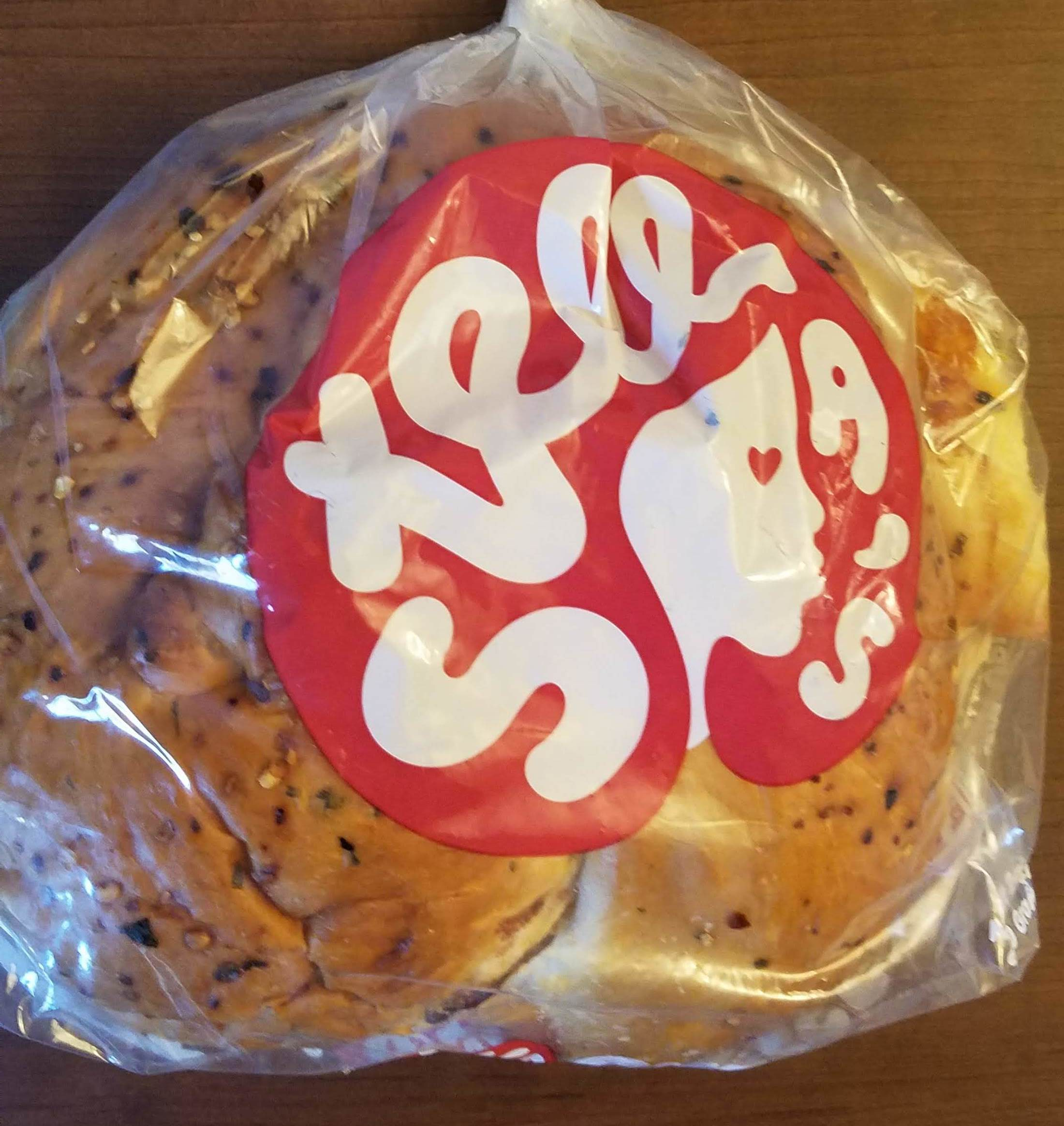
Hot and spicy cheese bread

Hot and Spicy Cheese Bread, or Wisconsin Cheesy Bread is a popular cheese bread in Madison, Wisconsin. The bread is sold at farmer's markets across the city and at local bakeries. It was originally created by Stella's Bakery, which still sells the bread today.

== Origin ==
The bread was created by accident when Coralia Harn of Stella's Bakery attempted to make an empanada that would appeal to the people of Madison. After getting frustrated with her empanada dough, she simply mixed the empanada filling into bread dough and sold it at the Dane County Farmers' Market the next day. Over the years the recipe has been refined. Today, the bread is made with a brioche-like yeasted dough, mixed with Provolone cheese, Monterey Jack cheese, and topped with crushed hot red peppers. It also contains chives and parsley. The bread is often eaten as a snack bread, pulled apart and eaten while walking around the farmers market.

The bread quickly became an important part of Madison's food culture. Over 2000 loaves are sold every Saturday at the Dane County Farmers Market, and in 2015 it was named by the Wisconsin State Journal as one of 30 "plates that define Madison".

== See also ==
- Cuisine of Wisconsin
