= Emile A. Zatarain Sr. =

American grocer and food entrepreneur

- Born: Emile Antoine Zatarain; 1866; New Orleans, Louisiana, U.S.
- Died: 1959 (aged 92–93); New Orleans, Louisiana, U.S.
- Known for: Founding of Zatarain's
- Spouse: Charlotte Zatarain (died 1929)
- Culinary career
- Cooking style: Cajun cuisine, Louisiana Creole cuisine

Emile Antoine Zatarain Sr. (c. 1866–1959) was a grocer and food entrepreneur who trademarked root beer and built a business selling spices, condiments, and foods flavored in the culinary traditions of New Orleans and Louisiana's Creole and Cajun cultures to the world via the brand that today is known simply as Zatarain's.

== History ==
Emile A. Zatarain Sr., a merchant and entrepreneur of Basque descent, was born in 1866, it is estimated on the 1910 U.S. Census. Zatarain was born in New Orleans. He had five sons, all of whom followed him into his business when they all finished school.

In 1886, Zatarain opened a grocery store with the first National Cash Register in Louisiana. A few months later, he bought a horse and buggy to make deliveries. The company's big success, at first, was root beer. According to great granddaughter Allison Zatarain, "Emile introduced Papoose Root Beer at 2:30 p.m. on May 7, 1889, at the Louisiana (Purchase) Exposition. The root beer was so successful, that his business grew, and grew, and grew!"

Several years later, Zatarain found that it was more cost effective to sell the root beer blend as an extract. Zatarain formed a company called Papoose Pure Food Products to manufacture the root beer and diversify into other foods, and he built a factory at 925 Valmont Street, New Orleans. He began to import and pack olives, pickles and spices.

On May 29, 1922, as his sons assumed more of the day-to-day operation, Zatarain reincorporated the business as E.A. Zatarain & Sons, Inc. and also did business as Zatarain's Pure Food Products. Emile A. Zatarain Jr. and his wife Ida May Bennett Zatarain eventually took over the business. Ida May created recipes for their products like Remoulade Sauce and Olive Salad.

== Personal life ==
Zatarain was married to a woman named Charlotte, who died in 1929. After her death, he created a religious shine in her honor. He had five surviving children, all sons. They were Edward J. Zatarain Sr. (born 1887), who served as Zatarain's vice president; John E. Zatarain (born 1890); Milton Zatarain (born 1895); Charles C. Zatarain (born 1897), who researched family genealogy and collected his father's memoirs; and Emile A. Zatarain Jr. (born 1902). Edward and Charles temporarily left the company to serve in the Navy and Army respectively during World War I. Emile A Zatarain Jr., the youngest, took over the company as his father slowly retired. Charles Zatarain was the last surviving son of Emile Sr. when he died in 1986 at age 89. His great-granddaughter, Allison Zatarain, wrote a history of Emile and the family in 1993.

=== Death ===
Emile Antoine Zatarain Sr. died in 1959. He was 93 years old.
