= Clambake =

Communal dining tradition from New England

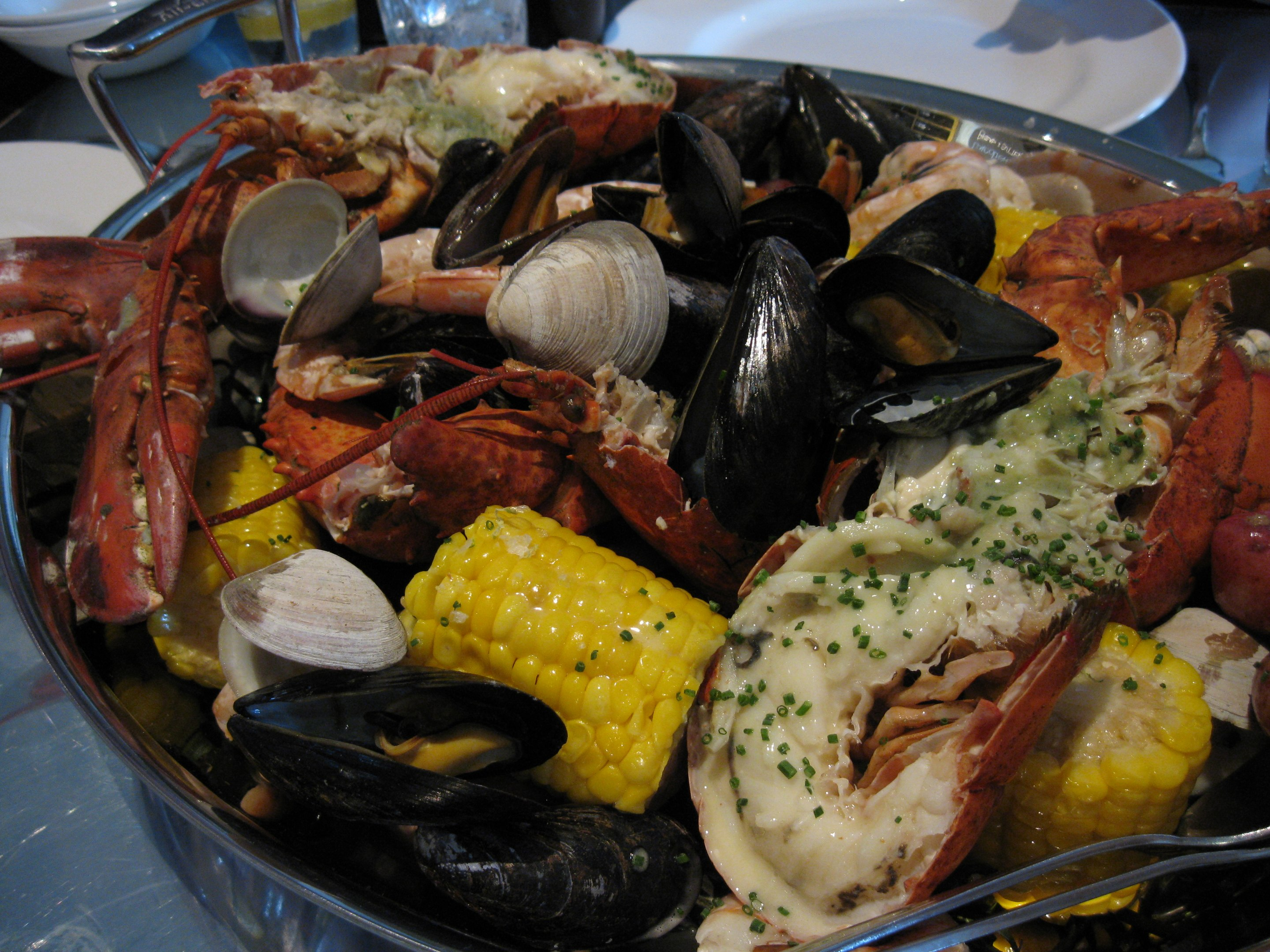
- Place of origin: United States
- Region or state: New England and Northeast Ohio
- Main ingredients: Shellfish and vegetables

The clambake or clam bake, also known as the New England clambake, is a traditional method of cooking seafood, such as lobster, mussels, crabs, scallops, soft-shell clams, and quahogs. The food is traditionally cooked by steaming the ingredients over layers of seaweed in a pit oven. The shellfish can be supplemented with vegetables, such as onions, carrots, and corn on the cob. Clambakes are usually held on festive occasions along the coast of New England and at fundraisers and political events. Some restaurants and caterers offer clambake-style food.

== History ==
It is known that Native Americans in what is now the eastern United States developed techniques to bake (or steam) clams, at least in Florida. Contrary to legend, though, American colonists did not learn to enjoy baked clams from Native Americans. The colonists did not consider clams to be an acceptable human food and instead fed clams to pigs, except during times of famine.

Author Andrew W. German concluded, "There is no question that Native American peoples have been consuming clams for four thousand years, but there is little evidence that they prepared them in the traditional New England way. Perhaps they smoked them for preservation, and they probably roasted them in open fires, but neither oral traditions nor early European observations refer to steaming in rockweed. And though we like to imagine the Wampanoags teaching the Pilgrims how to bake clams, there is good evidence that the early European settlers actually eschewed clams as food fit only for the poor, eating them as little as possible."

The clambake as it is now known does not go back to the colonial period. Consciously based on indigenous foods, it was developed in the United States after the American Revolution—a part of a created mythology as an "icon of its unique cultural identity".

The clambake "exploded" in popularity after the American Civil War. Rhode Island businessmen operated many clambake pavilions, and the first published clambake recipe credited that state as the origin. The practice spread throughout New England and on to other parts of the country.

After the Civil War, railroads began carrying fresh Atlantic seafood on ice from New York through Pennsylvania, Ohio and on to Chicago. This was the beginning of the popularity of the clambake in the Cleveland area. The Cleveland Plain Dealer published an article on October 15, 1866, called "Great Clam Bake at Camp Gilbert: A 'Running Account' Of It". The writer expressed the "firm opinion that clam bakes were glorious institutions."

In 1888 a group of Quakers in Dartmouth, Massachusetts held a clambake, which became an annual tradition each August that continues today. The event, called the "Allen’s Neck Friends Meeting Clambake", was attended by 625 people in 2017.

In 1950 the Maine Department of Sea and Shore Fisheries published a 12-page booklet titled "How to Prepare a Maine Clambake with Lobsters and All the Fixin's". The 1975 edition of Joy of Cooking, the cookbook first published in 1931, describes two versions of a clambake. The big version is cooked in a sandpit, and the small version is cooked in a large pot on a stove or a grill.

== Method ==
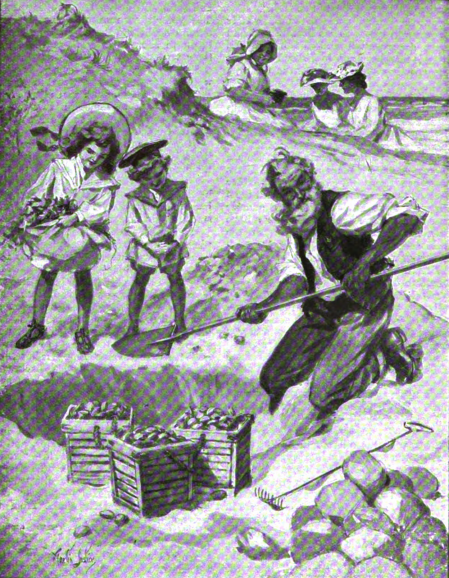
Illustration of a pit being dug in the beach sand in preparation for a traditional clambake, 1907

According to food journalist Mark Bittman, "Few meals are more beautiful than a well-executed clambake." A clambake begins with gathering seaweed (traditionally rockweed – Ascophyllum nodosum) at the shoreline; seaweed is an important adjunct to cooking the food. To keep the seaweed fresh, it is necessary to have a container large enough to hold both the seaweed and a fair amount of seawater.

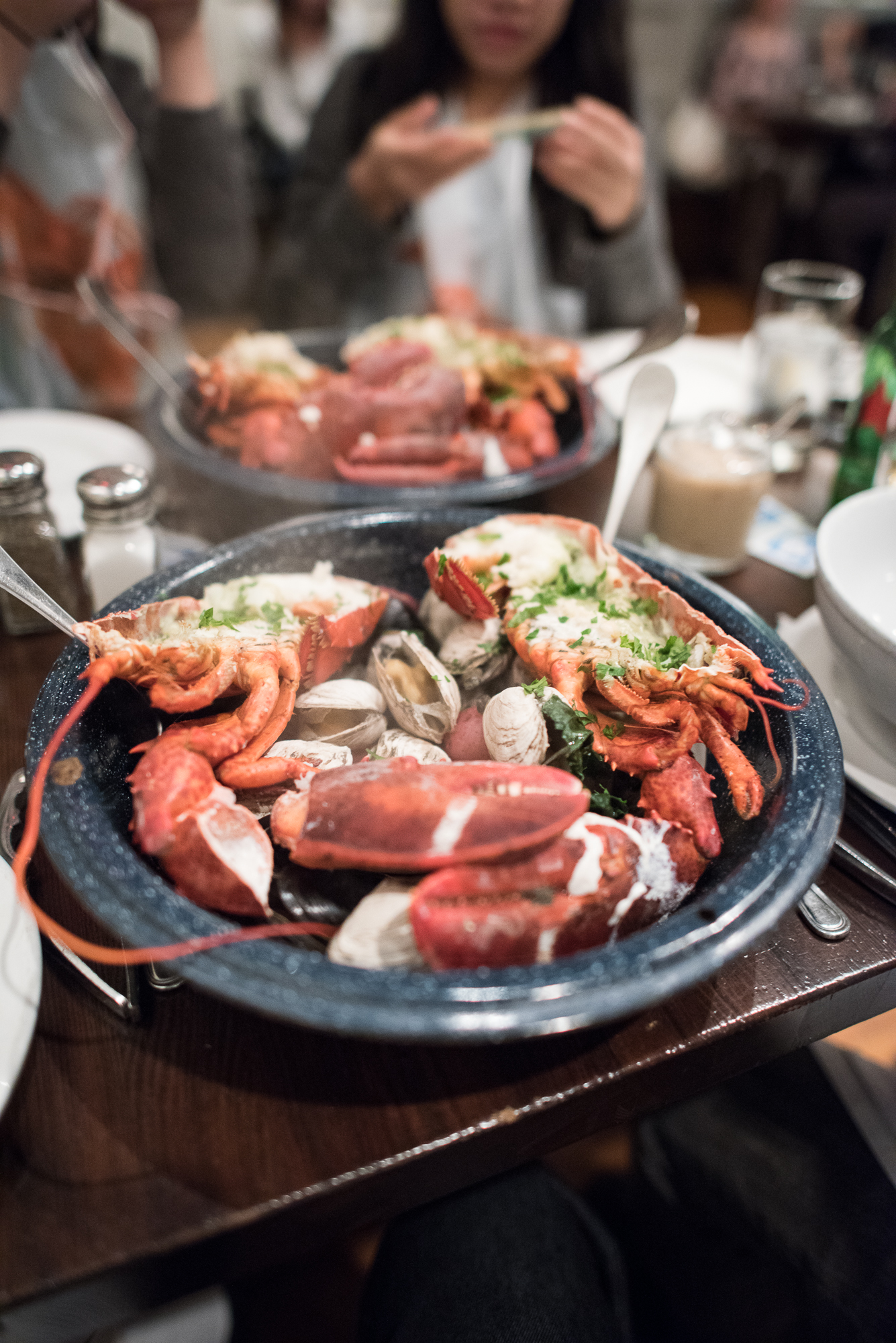
Clambake from Philadelphia

Also important are round medium-sized stones, which are heated in the fire and used to re-radiate heat during the cooking process.

Finally, like most other methods of steaming, a cover is necessary to allow the trapped heat and steam to thoroughly cook the food. Canvas tarps or potato sacks soaked in seawater are often used for this purpose. Sometimes, canvas sails are used.

Once the stones and seaweed have been collected, a fire pit is prepared. Some prefer to simply start a fire within the pit, while others line the edges with flat stones to provide support for a metal grill on which the stones may be placed.

The stones used for cooking are then placed in the center of the pit and a wood fire is started, although the exact method of heating the stones varies. The fire must burn until the stones are glowing hot. Care must be taken to ensure that the fire will burn out shortly after this optimal cooking temperature is achieved. The ashes are then swept off the stones and raked between them to form an insulating "bed." A layer of wet seaweed is placed over the stones, followed by traditional regional foods such as steamers, mussels, quahogs, and lobsters. Sausages are sometimes cooked as well. Side dishes usually include corn on the cob, potatoes, carrots, and onions. Alternating layers of seaweed and food are piled on top, and the entire mound is covered with canvas that has been drenched in water to seal in the heat and prevent the canvas from burning. The food is allowed to steam for several hours.

Many locales outlaw building fires on beaches, and those that do often require permits. In order to accommodate the dish in homes or backyards, this dish is often prepared in a large pot in much smaller quantities. This is known as a New England clam boil. Some caterers specialize in clambakes on the beach.

Clambakes are also popular in Greater Cleveland, even though that region is not near the Atlantic Ocean. A typical clambake there includes a dozen clams with half a chicken, sweet potatoes, corn, and other side dishes. Seaweed is not used and the clams, chicken, and sweet potatoes are all steamed together in a large pot. John D. Rockefeller started the tradition in Ohio. A vendor at the West Side Market in Cleveland claimed in 2025 that "[t]hey send more clams to Cleveland than anywhere else in the world" in the fall.

== In popular culture ==
The 1945 Rodgers and Hammerstein Broadway musical Carousel featured a song called "A Real Nice Clambake". The song was also in the 1956 film version. Hammerstein spent a lot of time researching in order to write the lyrics for the song. He consulted over 20 books and spoke to chefs, dialect experts and historians. The book that influenced him most was Mainstays of Maine by Pulitzer Prize winning poet Robert P. T. Coffin. The book included a full chapter about a clambake on a Maine island, with great culinary detail. Many of these details were incorporated into Hammerstein's lyrics, including describing lapping up chowder "with a clamshell, tied onto a bayberry stick."

== See also ==
- Curanto
- Fish boil
- Hāngī
- Kalua
- Pachamanca
- List of clam dishes
- List of seafood dishes
- Pig roast
- Seafood boil
