= Seafood boil =

American social event involving the consumption of seafood

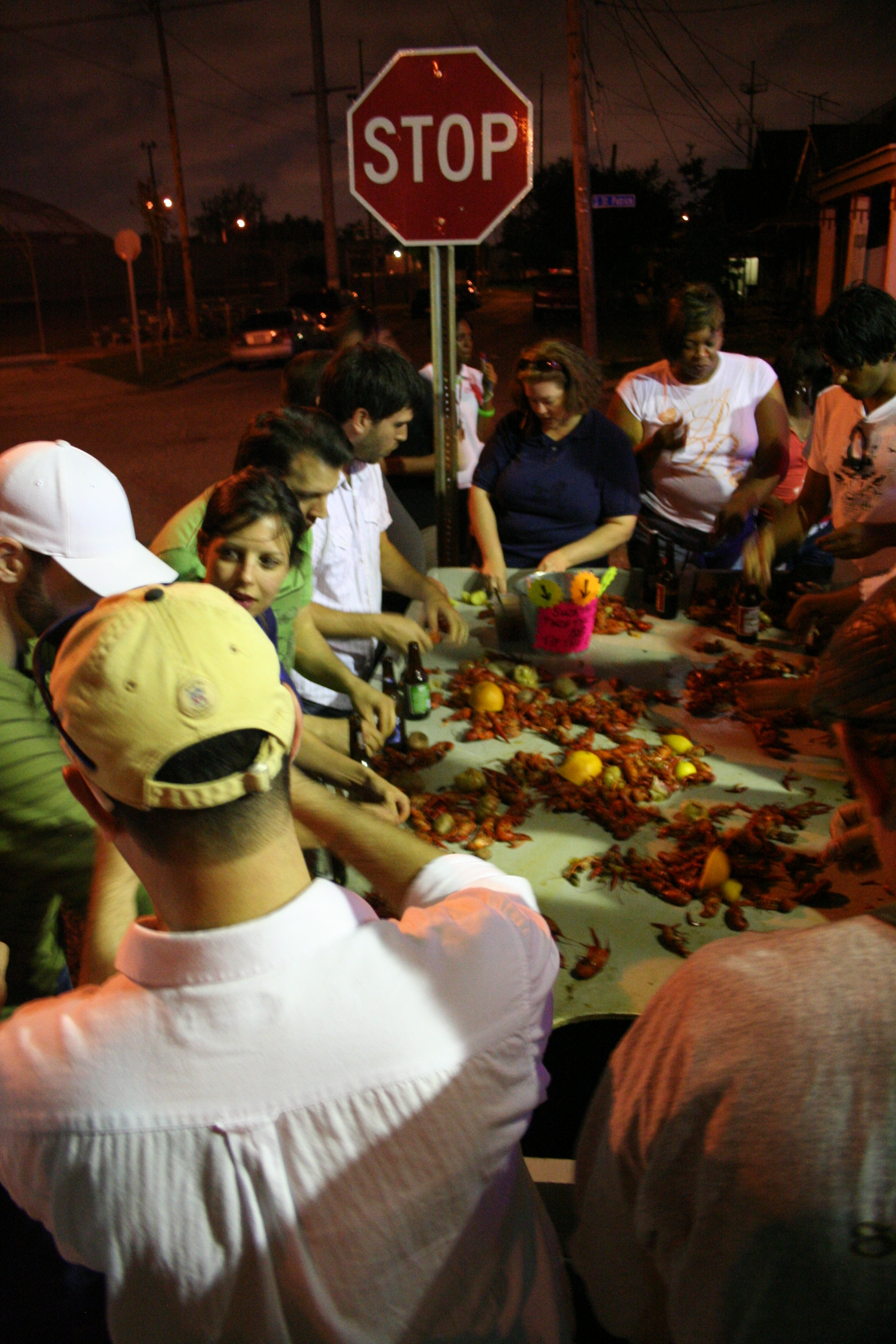
A crawfish boil in New Orleans.

Seafood boil or seafood broil in the United States is the generic term for any number of types of social events in which shellfish, whether saltwater or freshwater, is the central element. Regional variations dictate the kinds of seafood, the accompaniments and side dishes, and the preparation techniques (boiling, steaming, baking, or raw). In some cases, a boil may be sponsored by a community organization as a fund-raiser or a mixer. In this way, seafood boils are like a fish fry, barbecue, or church potluck supper. Boils are also held by individuals for their friends and family for a weekend get-together and on the holidays of Memorial Day and Independence Day. While boils and bakes are traditionally associated with coastal regions of the United States and its afrodescendant cultures, there are exceptions.

== Louisiana ==
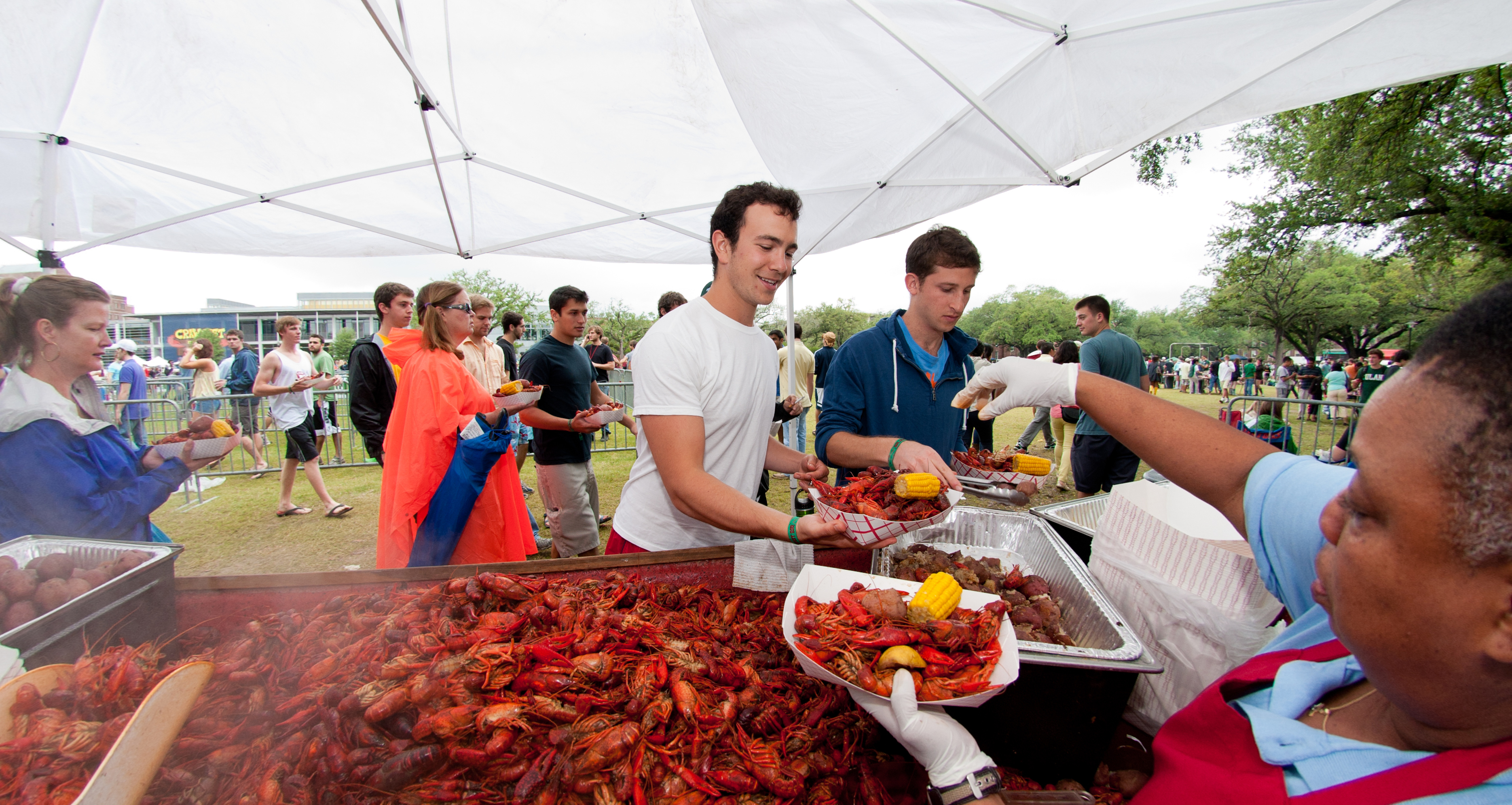
The Tulane University Crawfest festival.

Shrimp, crab, and crawfish boils are a Louisiana Cajun and Louisiana Creole tradition and can be found along the Gulf Coast. But the more popular crawfish boil is most closely associated with Louisiana. The Breaux Bridge Crawfish Festival in Louisiana has been named one of the top 10 food events by USA Today and is a showcase for Creole and Cajun music and culture. Major crawfish boils are held by churches and other organizations as fundraisers throughout the spring. Tulane University holds an annual "Crawfest" in April, and the University of New Orleans holds an annual crawfish boil for all students at the end of the spring semester (Students unwinding on Crawfish and Unprecedented Fun—SUCAUF). Smaller events can be found in backyards and parks throughout April, May, and June. Locals traditionally eat crawfish, as well as crabs, without tools such as shell crackers or picks.

One reason for the popularity of crawfish may be price. During the height of the season (late spring) the price may be less than a $1.50/pound retail for live crawfish (2006) with crawfish prices currently being around $.99/pound. Shrimp and crab are higher valued cash crops, and can be a less affordable option for larger groups.

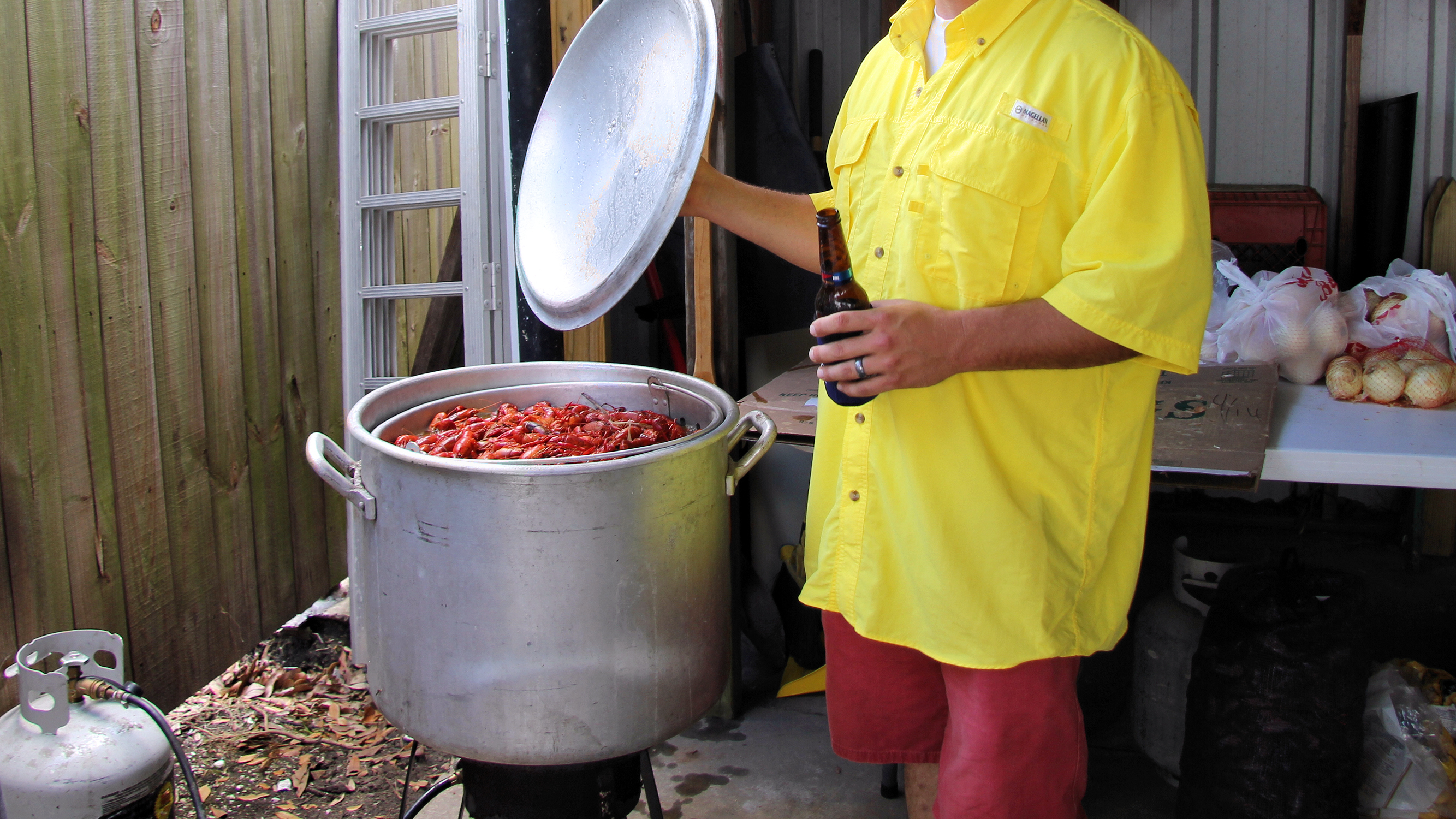
Cooking crawfish at a party

A boil is usually done in a large pot (60 to 80 quarts — large enough to necessitate a truck in most cases) fitted with a strainer and heated by propane. However, some traditionalists see no need for a strainer and make use of a net or a wire mesh scoop. Seasonings include crab boil packets, cayenne pepper, hot sauce, salt, lemons, and bay leaf. Ears of corn, new potatoes, onions, and heads of garlic are usually included in shrimp and crawfish boils. Some people will add smoked sausage links or mushrooms. When cooking crawfish there is a debate over whether or not the crawfish must first be purged by covering them with clear water and a generous amount of salt for a few minutes. Advocates argue that this forces the crawfish to rid their bodies of impurities. Others argue that it does not work and is an unnecessary step. A "Boil Master" is in charge of making sure the ingredients go into the pot in the proper sequence and controls the timing of the steps. There is no right or wrong when seasoning a crawfish boil and many experienced boilers simply go by feel although there are some guidelines to follow and a great deal of opinions on how a boiled crawfish should be seasoned. Many recipes call for a short boil followed by a period of soaking with the heat turned off. The contents of the pot are removed, drained, and then dumped onto a newspaper covered table. Sometimes, crawfish may be dumped into the traditional watercraft in which crawfishermen have historically used to traverse the bayous and swamps; a pirogue. Bottles of hot sauce, lemons and melted butter are usually available, along with cocktail sauce at a shrimp boil. Some families like to use Italian salad dressing or ketchup, or a mixture of both. However, the tradition has also found far from home beyond the gulf coast in Mississauga, ON. Seafood boil restaurants like Mermaid Boil has been focusing on serving Mediterranean flavours like garlic butter, herbs and warm spices to serve communal boil experience.

Howard Mitcham and his Guild of Chimney Sweepers (named in honor of a dinner that Charles Lamb hosted for the London sweeps) hosted a shrimp boil every year for French Quarter bohemians during the 1950s and 1960s. He notes, "At our last big party we boiled 400 pounds of shrimp and 400 fat crabs for 200 guests and we drank eight thirty-gallon kegs of beer. For music we had Kid Thomas and his Algiers Stompers, the famous old gut-bucket jazz group from Preservation Hall, and the Olympia Funeral Marching Band". The Chimney Sweepers technique was to use new thirty-gallon galvanized garbage cans, filled one third full of water and brought to a boil with seasonings. The shrimp were divided into 25 pound batches and stuffed into new pillow cases and tied off. Twenty-five pounds of shrimp took about ,.25 minutes to cook. One batch came out and the next went in.

== Georgia and the Carolinas ==
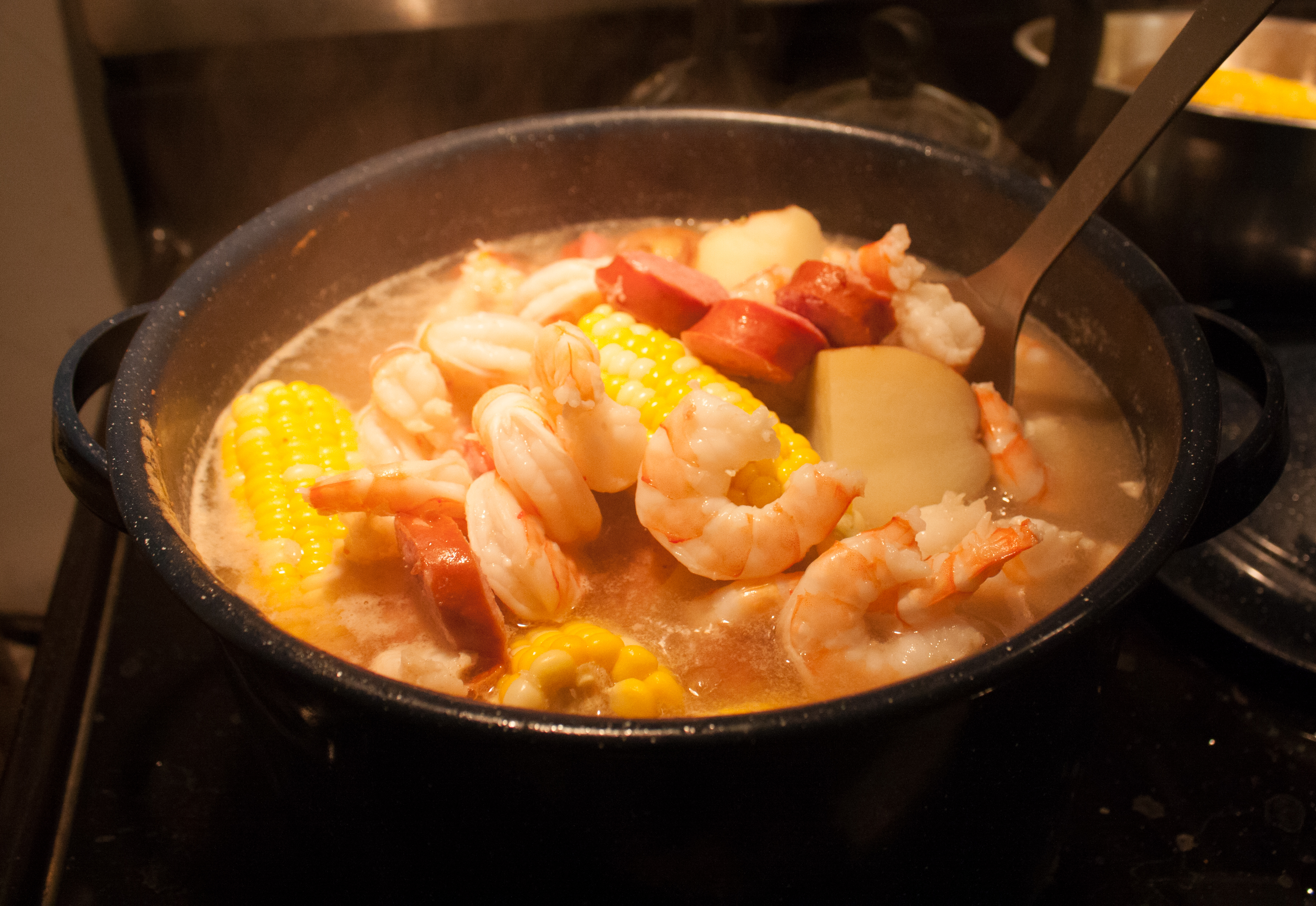
Shrimp boil, also known as Lowcountry Boil or Frogmore Stew

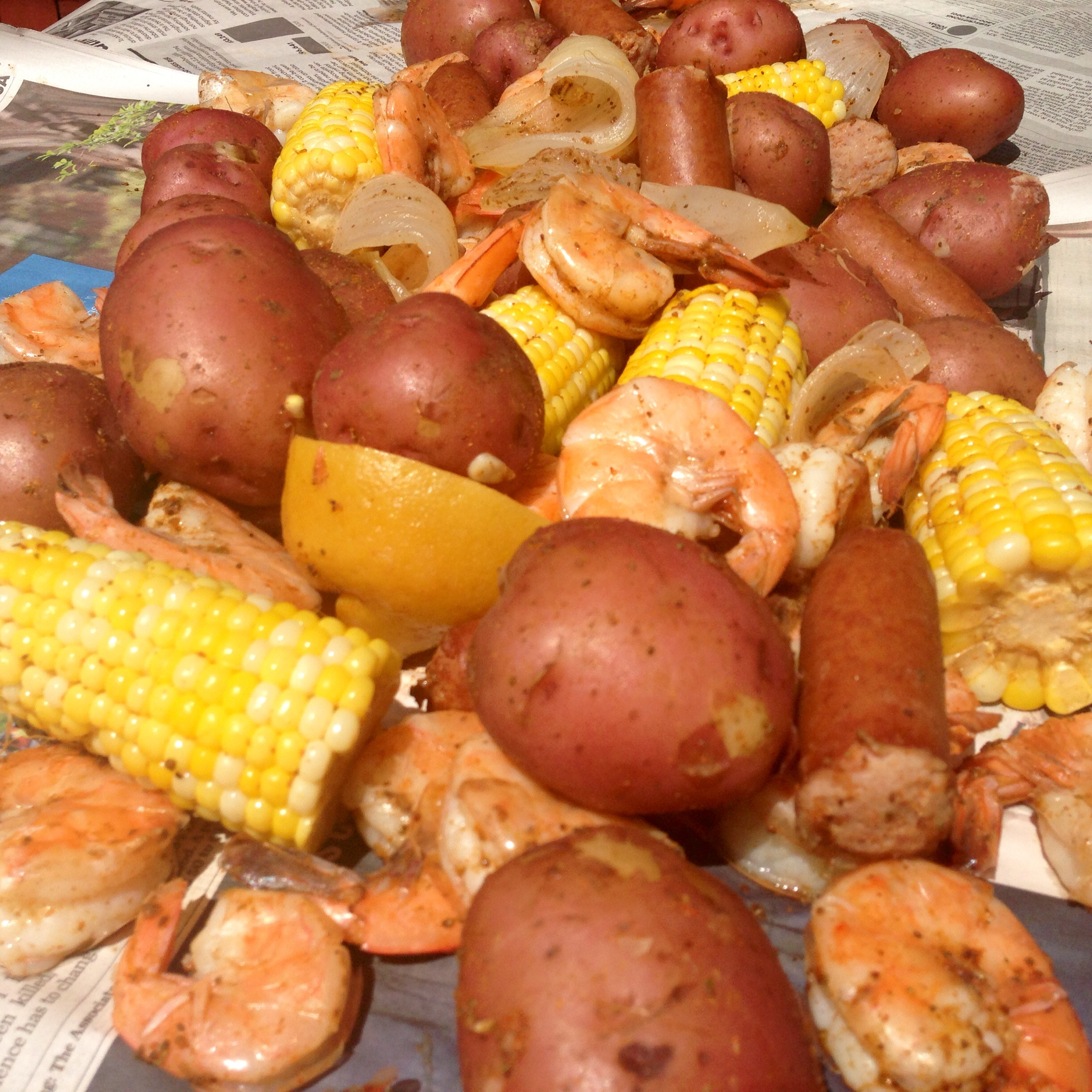
Lowcountry Boil with shrimp, potatoes, corn, and sausage

There are two kinds of social gatherings in coastal Georgia and the Carolinas that revolve around shellfish. One is very much like a Louisiana boil, known variously as Frogmore Stew, Beaufort Stew, a Beaufort Boil, a Lowcountry Boil, or a Tidewater Boil; the other is the Oyster Roast.

A Lowcountry Boil usually involves shrimp, corn on the cob, sausage, and red potatoes, and sometimes ham, and is considered part of Lowcountry cuisine. They tend to be a bit milder than their Louisiana cousins. For example, it is not unusual for a Lowcountry recipe to call for a mixture of hot and mild boil seasonings, whereas a Louisiana recipe may start with crab boil packets and add large amounts of cayenne pepper. While shrimp are most often used, crabs or crawfish may be included if available. This is also a bit different from a Louisiana boil, which usually involves just one kind of shellfish at a time.

Frogmore is the name of a community in the middle of St. Helena Island, near Beaufort, South Carolina. Although there are many versions of this dish around, the name Frogmore Stew was coined in the 1960s by Richard Gay, one of the owners of Gay Fish Company, circa 1948, on St. Helena Island. Frogmore Stew became far better-known after it was featured on the cover of Gourmet magazine in the 1980s, and is enjoyed by all, with this name, to this day. In 2005, The Travel Channel featured Richard's brother, Charles Gay, cooking Frogmore Stew in its popular program Taste of America with Mark DeCarlo.

The Lowcountry Boil may have possible influences from Louisiana, as there are some obvious similarities to some dishes of the cuisine of Louisiana. It showcases the same set of French, Spanish, African and Afro-Caribbean influences (spawning from the slave trade and Acadian expulsion), that Louisiana is known for. Meals for large gatherings of people would have to be made as quickly as possible with readily available foods. The boil was a quick and easy way to prepare all the foods at once.

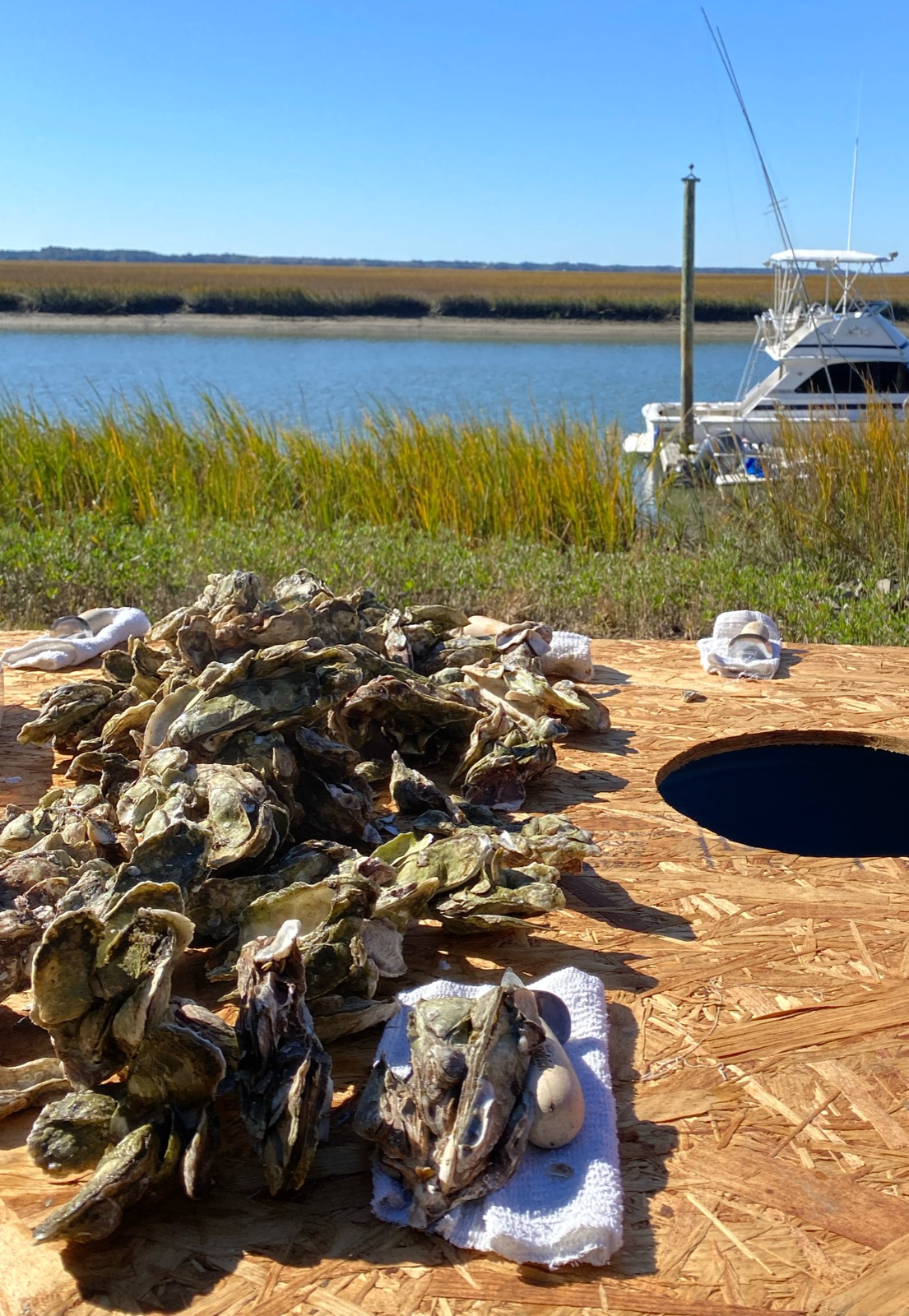
Lowcountry oyster roast on a South Carolina barrier island

The best-attended function to feature Frogmore Stew occurs in July at the 10-day Beaufort Water Festival (in the 54 years of the festival it has grown to be the largest totally volunteer-run festival on the south eastern coast), the event feeds 2,400, the recipe includes 1,200 lbs of shrimp, 2,400 ears of corn, 600 lbs of sausage, 72 oz of seafood seasoning (for perspective, 72oz of crab boil would be enough to boil approximately 4 sacks of crawfish in Louisiana, which would feed about 16 adults) and is served with 350 lbs of coleslaw, 250 gal of iced tea, 2,400 rolls and 90 watermelons.

The other kind of event is the Oyster Roast. Sheet metal or a fine mesh grill is placed over hot coals. Oysters are piled onto the grill (after having the mud washed off their shells). Wet burlap sacks are draped over the shells and the oysters are half grilled and half steamed. A shovel is used to scoop them onto nearby tables (plywood sheets on sawhorses works as well as anything). The shells have popped open (and are still hot), but the oysters are attached and just need a little coaxing to come free. This is particularly popular in the winter when the oysters are good and a hot fire keeps the coastal chill at bay.

Both of these events are often large social functions in which a neighborhood, family, or friends gather for fellowship. Music, drinking, and dancing, especially the Carolina shag, are also common at these events. The most famous example of such a function takes place in Columbia, South Carolina, in late November prior to the in-state Clemson and South Carolina football game, on South Waccamaw Street.

== Maryland and the Chesapeake Bay ==
The Chesapeake Bay is the largest estuary system in North America with most of its shoreline residing in the state of Maryland. The Chesapeake provides Maryland with an abundance of seafood including but not limited to blue crabs, oysters, and clams.

In Maryland gathering for steamed crabs is a popular tradition. Terms like "crab boil" and "seafood boil" are not used, due to a different cooking method. The cooking technique is steaming rather than boiling, but the event is similar enough. Crab pots have a raised bottom that keeps a fitted basket above the liquid. A couple of inches of water (sometimes beer is added to the water) and vinegar are brought to a boil. The crabs are placed in the basket and sprinkled liberally with a seasoning mix, usually a blend from the J.O. Spice Company (Old Bay and other blends are used in smaller amounts by home cooks), and then placed in the steamer. The steaming takes approximately twenty minutes and turns the crabs bright red while leaving a heavy layer of seasoning caked on. The crabs are served either on large platters or dumped directly on tables covered with layers of butcher paper. The butcher paper provides an easy way of clearing the table of shells after eating. Tables are generally set with crab knives and small wooden mallets. Crab mallets are used for cracking claws(most commonly with young children) while knives are used for thoroughly removing all of the crab meat. Condiments used are apple cider vinegar, melted butter and extra crab seasoning. Typical side dishes are coleslaw and corn on the cob.

== New England ==
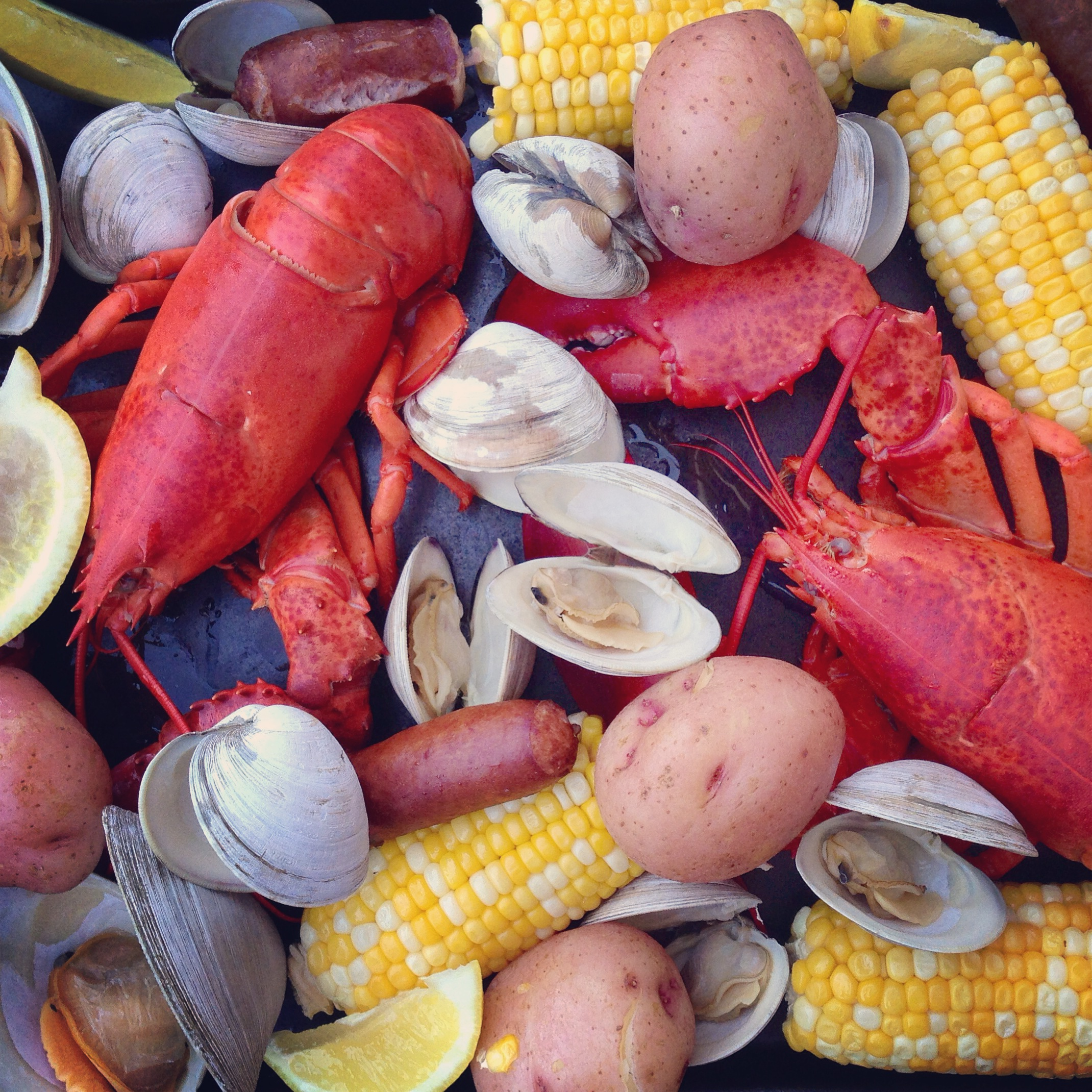
Clambake

In New England, a clambake is traditionally done on a beach. A pit is dug in the sand and lined with stones. A fire is built on top of the stones from driftwood. Once the fire dies down, seafood is placed on the stones and covered with seaweed and a canvas tarp. The residual heat from the stones along with steam from the moisture of the seaweed combines to cook the food. While lobster is often featured at clam bakes, some authors suggest that in practice, lobster will not be fully cooked by the time the stones have lost most of their heat.

An alternative to the labor-intensive bake is the New England Clam Boil. Like other regions, corn, potatoes, and sausage are popular additions. Recipes from the region suggest that little or no seasonings are added. Beer is often used as the boiling liquid.

== Charente-Maritime ==
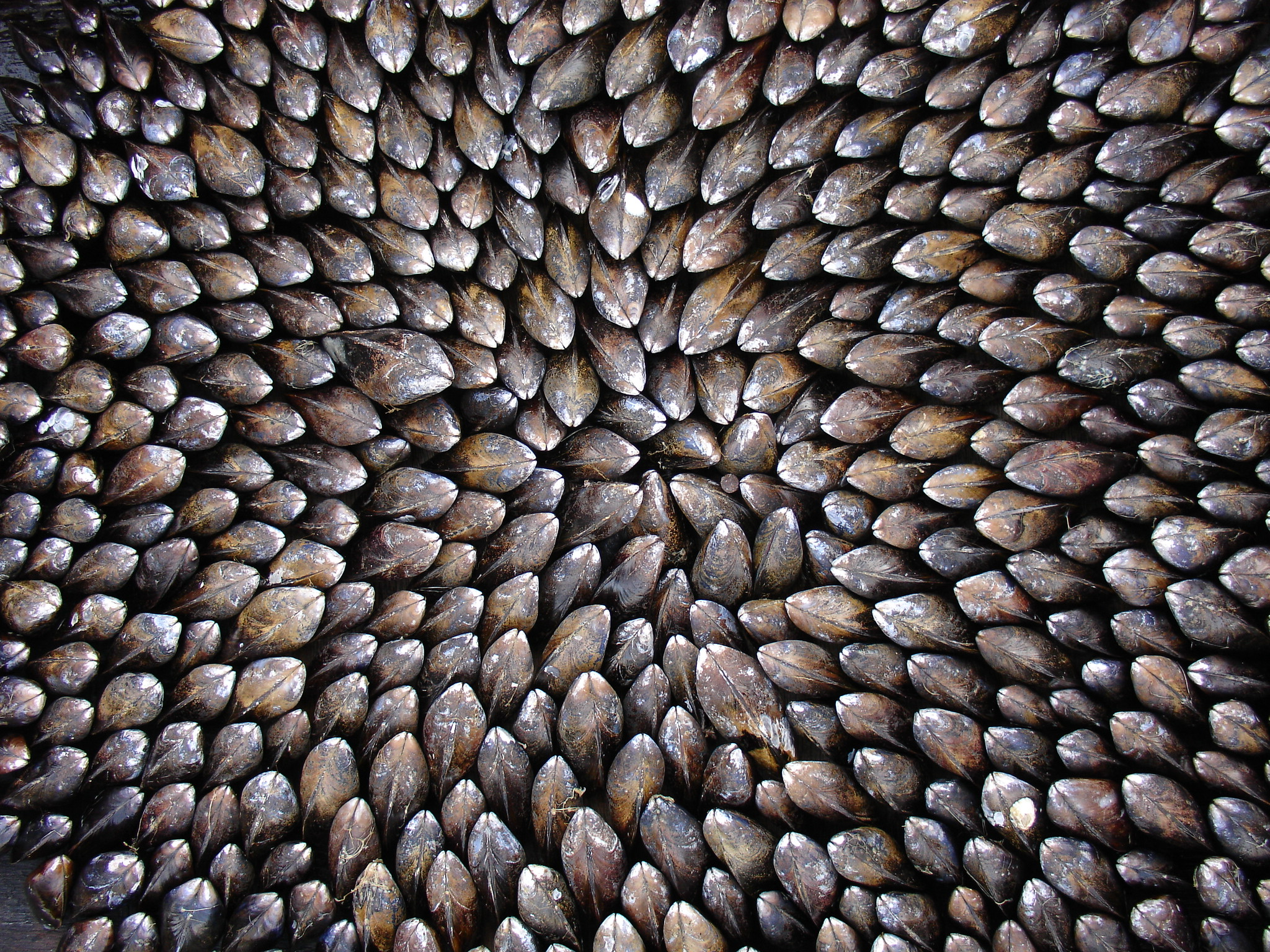
Mussels arranged for an eclade

The Charente-Maritime département of France, on the Bay of Biscay, is noted for the abundance of mussels. The Éclade des Moules (or, locally, Terré de Moules) is a bake often held on the beaches outside of La Rochelle. The mussels are arranged in concentric circles on a plank so that the hinged part of the shell is facing up. Pine needles are mounded on top to a depth of a foot or so and set afire. The needles burn down quickly, producing a rich resinous smoke. Two or three minutes after the fire goes out, the ashes are swept away and the mussels are eaten directly from the shell along with country bread, butter, and white wine.

== See also ==
- Cajun cuisine
- Crayfish as food
- Crayfish party
- Cuisine of the Southern United States
- Fish boil
- Louisiana Creole cuisine
- Lowcountry cuisine
- Spice bag
