= Fish fry =

Dish consisting of battered or breaded fried fish

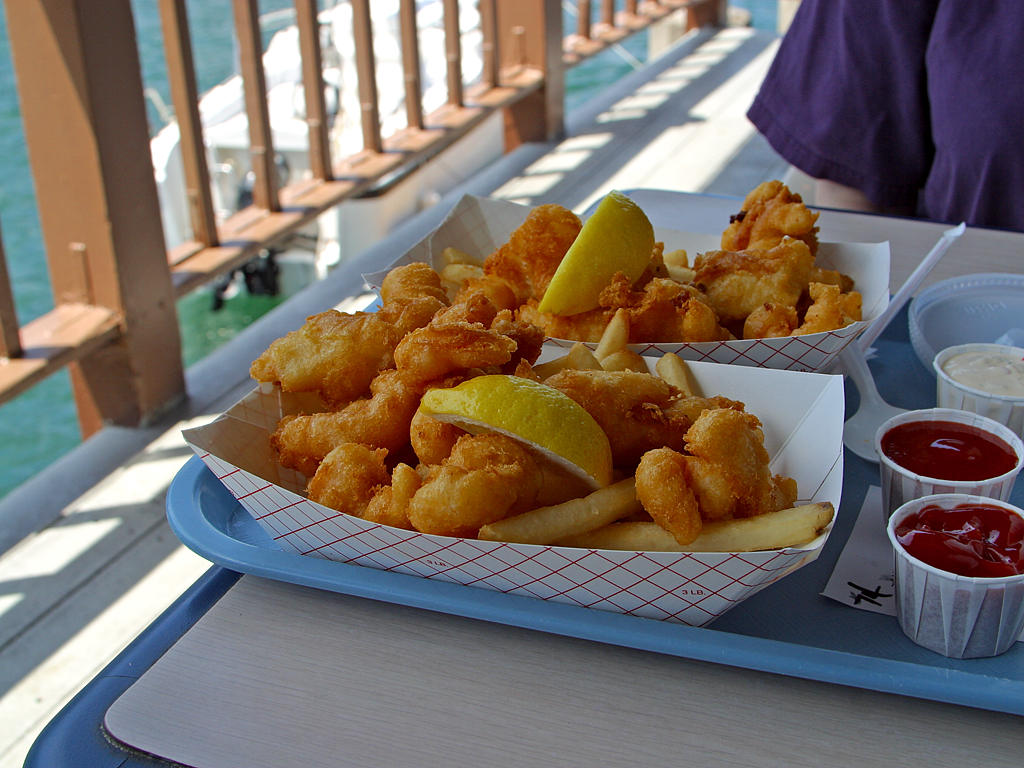
American-style fish and chips with lemon, ketchup, cocktail sauce, and tartar sauce as served in San Diego

A fish fry is a social event centered on a meal of battered or breaded fried fish. It usually also includes french fries, coleslaw, macaroni salad, lemon slices, tartar sauce, hot sauce, malt vinegar and dessert. Some Native American versions are cooked by coating fish with semolina and egg yolk.

A fish fry may include potato pancakes (with accompanying side dishes of sour cream or applesauce) and sliced caraway rye bread if served in a German restaurant or area.

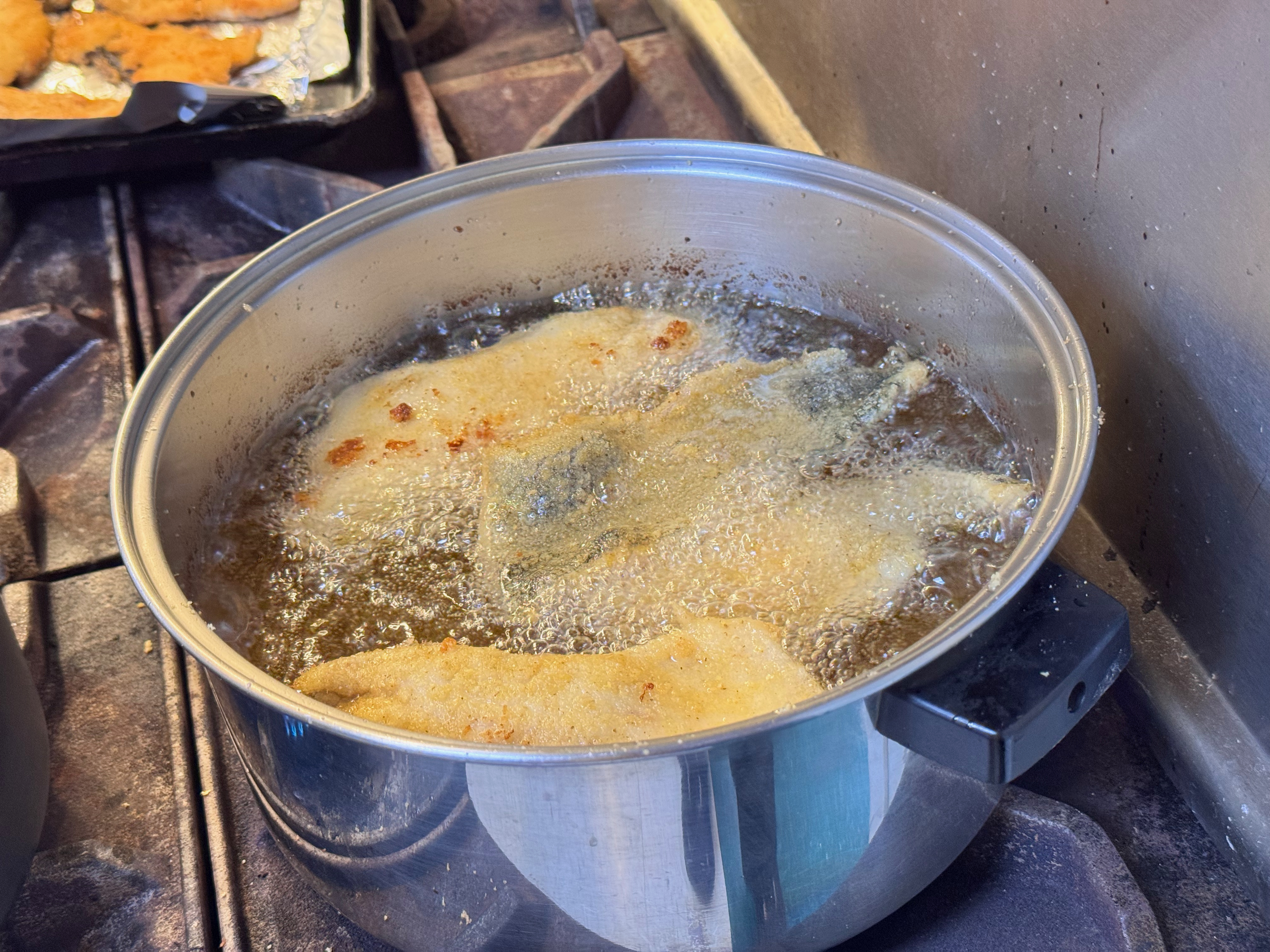
Fish frying at a community center fundraiser

Fish fries are very common in the Midwestern and northeastern regions of the United States. Fish is often served on Friday nights as a restaurant special or through church fundraisers. This is especially true for Christian communities during Lent, the Christian season of repentance, when tradition calls for abstinence from meat.

A "shore lunch" is common in the northern United States and Canada. For decades, outdoor enthusiasts have been cooking their catch on the shores of their favorite lakes.

== Lenten fish fries ==
The tradition of Christians fasting on Fridays to recognize Jesus's crucifixion on Good Friday dates to the first century AD. Fish had been associated with religious holidays even in pre-Christian times. The first mention of fish in connection with Lent, the season of repentance in Christianity, comes from Socrates of Constantinople, a church historian in the third and fourth centuries who spoke of abstaining from meat and meat products (such as cheese and eggs) during the 40 days of Lent. The custom was mentioned by Pope Gregory I, who was elected in 590, and was later incorporated into canon law. The Roman Catholic tradition of Christianity has been that the flesh of warm-blooded animals is off limits on Fridays, although the 1983 Code of Canon Law provided for alternative observances of the Friday penance outside Lent. In Methodist Christianity, The Directions Given to Band Societies mandate fasting and abstinence from meat on all Fridays of the year. The Book of Common Prayer of the Anglican Christian denomination requires abstinence from meat on all Fridays of the year too.

McDonald's addition of the Filet-o-Fish to its menu occurred when a Cincinnati franchise in a heavily Catholic neighborhood was struggling to sell hamburgers on Fridays during Lent.

== Midwestern United States ==
The modern fish fry tradition is strong in Wisconsin, where hundreds of eateries hold fish fries on Fridays, and sometimes on Wednesdays. The Friday night fish fry is a popular year-round tradition in Wisconsin among people of all religious backgrounds. Fish fries (fried fish meals) are offered at many restaurants, taverns that serve food, VFW halls, and at Christian churches, especially those of the Roman Catholic, Lutheran, Anglican and Methodist traditions, as fundraisers. A typical Wisconsin fish fry consists of beer batter fried cod, perch, bluegill, walleye, smelt, or in areas along the Mississippi River, catfish. The meal usually comes with tartar sauce, French fries or German-style potato pancakes, coleslaw, and rye bread, though baked beans are not uncommon. The tradition in Wisconsin began because Wisconsin was settled heavily by Catholics of German, Polish, and other backgrounds whose religion forbade eating meat on Fridays. The number of lakes in the state meant that eating fish became a popular alternative. Scandinavian settlements in northern and eastern Wisconsin favored the fish boil, a variant on the fish fry, which involves heating potatoes, white fish, and salt in a large cauldron.

== Northeastern United States ==
Battered or breaded haddock and cod fish fry is one of the trademarks of upstate New York cuisine and northwestern Pennsylvania, especially Albany, Buffalo, Pittsburgh, Rochester, Syracuse, and Utica. Many restaurants in these cities serve a fish fry on Friday, even outside Lent, and it is often available throughout the week. These meals typically consist of a piece of fish, coleslaw (sometimes potato salad or macaroni salad), french fries, and a dinner roll.

== Southeastern United States ==
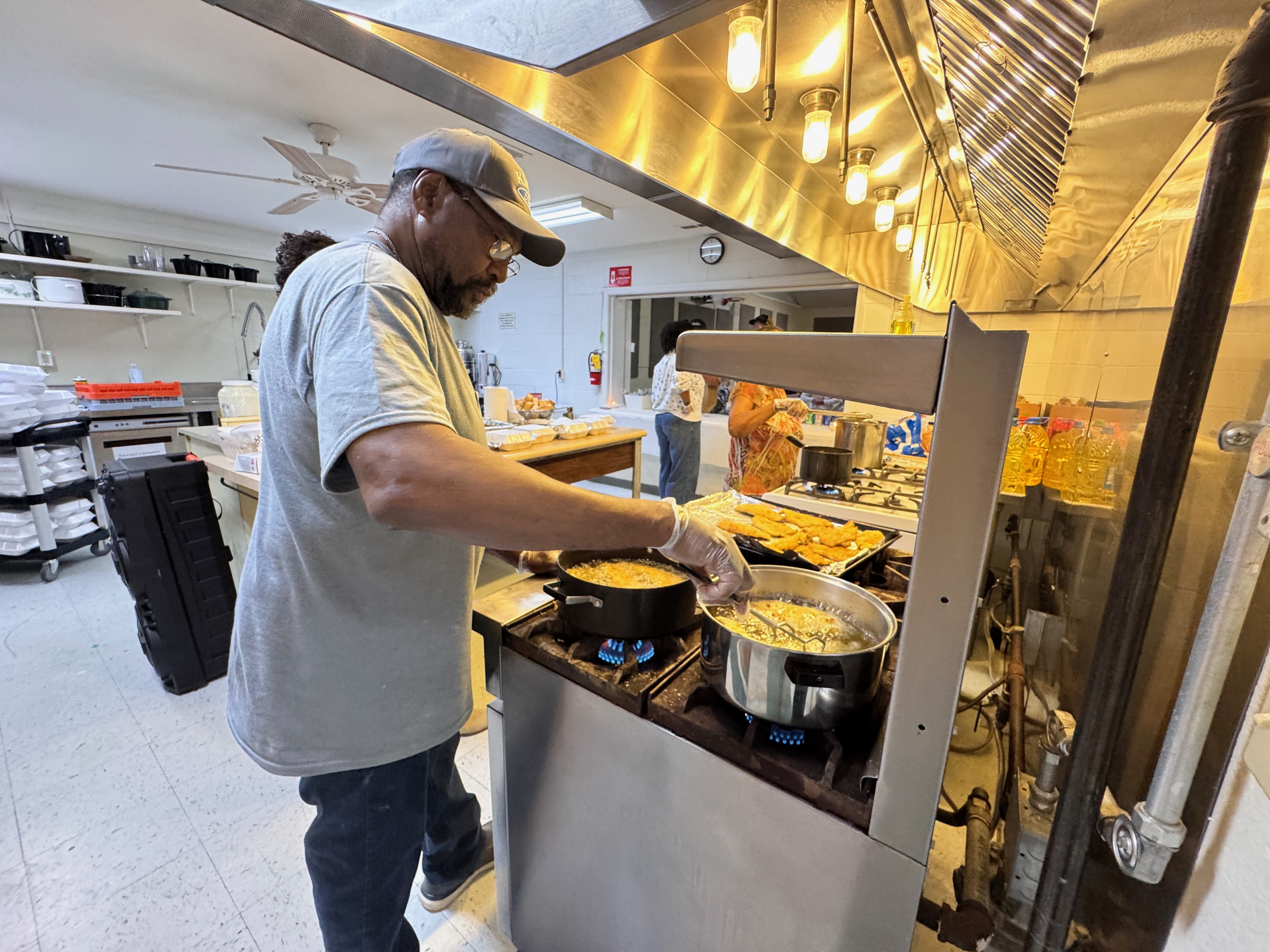
A fish fry in Brasstown, North Carolina

In the southern United States, a fish fry is a family or social gathering, held outdoors or in large halls. At a typical fish fry, quantities of fish (such as bream, catfish, flounder and bass) available locally are battered and deep-fried in cooking oil. The batter usually consists of corn meal, milk or buttermilk, and seasonings. In addition to the fish, hushpuppies (deep-fried, seasoned corn dumplings), and coleslaw are served. These events are often potluck affairs. In Georgia and South Carolina, fish are dipped in milk, then into a mix of flour, cornmeal and seasonings before frying. Cheese grits is often a side dish.

== See also ==
- Burgoo, a Southern stew that is sometimes a church fundraiser
- Fasting and abstinence in the Catholic Church
- Fish and chips
- Fish boil
- Pescado frito
- Seafood boil
- Stamp and Go, Jamaican breakfast fish fritter
- Tempura
- Wurst mart, a sausage cook event
