= Fish boil =

Culinary tradition in areas of Wisconsin

A fish boil in Baileys Harbor, Wisconsin

A fish boil is a culinary tradition in areas of Wisconsin and along the coastal Upper Great Lakes, with large Scandinavian populations. Fish boils enjoy a particularly strong presence in Door County, Port Wing and Port Washington, Wisconsin. The meal most often consists of Lake Michigan or Lake Superior whitefish (though lake trout or salmon can be used), with other ingredients.

== History ==
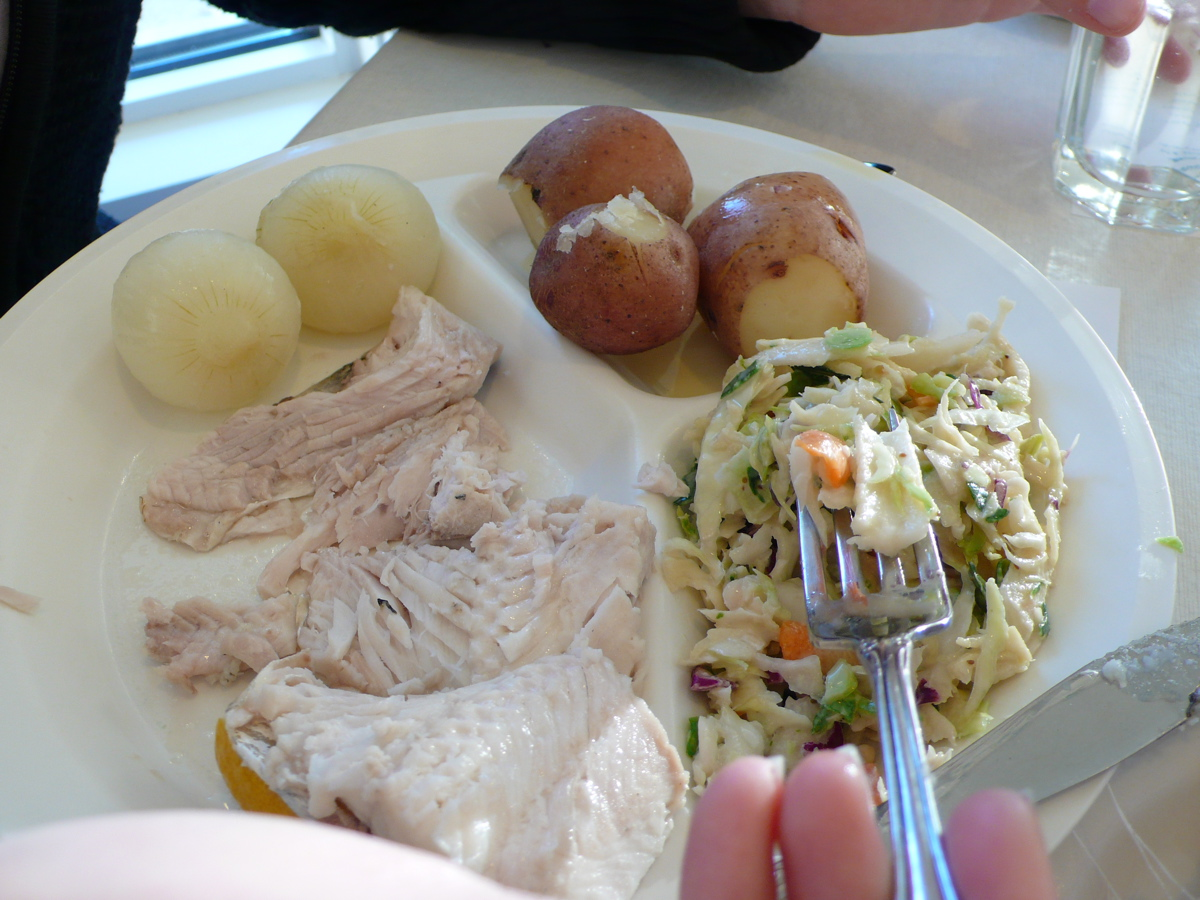
Platter of fish boil, which is traditionally served in Door County

Many credit Scandinavian immigrants for bringing the fish boil to Door County. Fish boils were originally used to feed large crowds of lumberjacks and fishermen. It was a quick economic way to feed large groups of people. It later became an attraction at restaurants.

== Preparation ==
The fish is cut into small chunks and cooked in boiling water with red potatoes. Some boilers add onions as well. Salt is the only seasoning used, raising the specific gravity of the water. Up to one pound of salt per two gallons of water is used. The fish and potatoes are prepared in a cast-iron kettle. When the water comes to a boil, the potatoes, kept in a wire basket, are lowered in.

The fish are then placed in another wire basket and lowered in. After 9–10 minutes, when the fish are cooked, the oils rise to the top of the pot. The boiler then tosses a small amount of kerosene on the fire and the increase in flames causes a boilover. The fish oils spill over the side of the pot and the fish is done. The fish chunks remain whole and firm. Chefs usually drip melted butter over the fish before serving. Scandinavian practice often includes ground horseradish in the melted butter; however, this practice is no longer observed in most commercial North American fish boil fare. Although not part of the traditional recipe, tartar sauce and lemon slices are often served with the fish.

Fish boils do not always involve a flare-up with kerosene or fuel oil. This practice originated in Door County to entertain tourists.

== See also ==
- Clambake
- Fish fry
- Seafood boil
- Crab boil
- Louisiana Creole cuisine § Crawfish boil
- Booyah (stew)
- Sagamite
- List of fish dishes
