= Crab boil =

Social event involving the consumption of crab

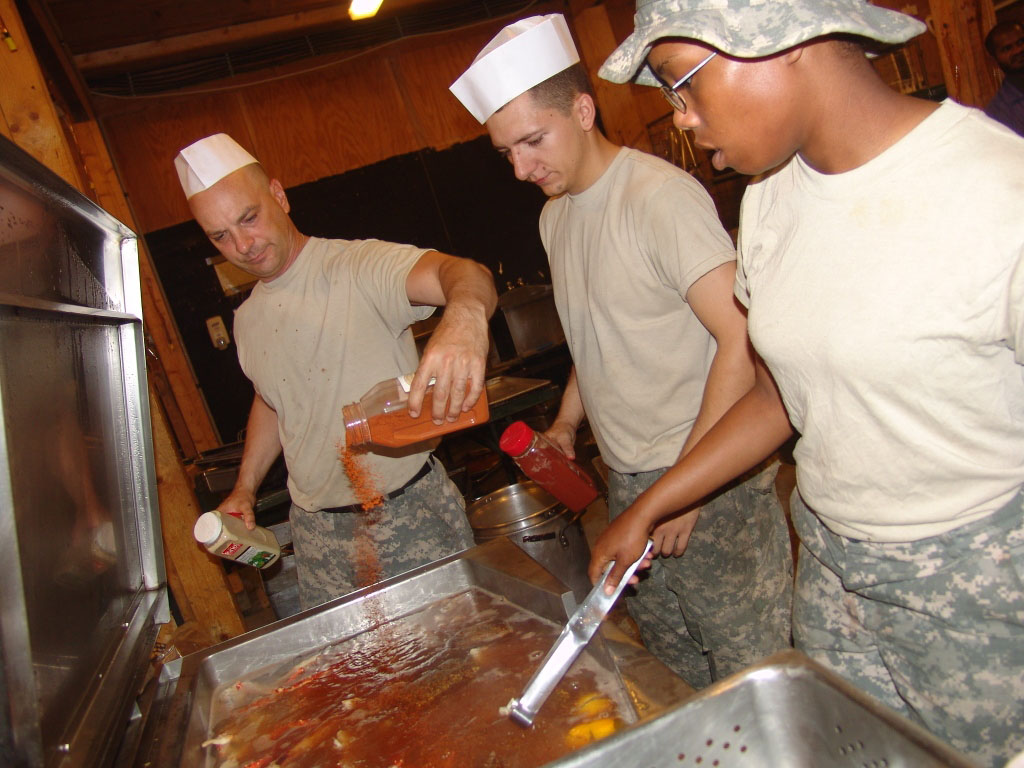
Soldiers preparing a crab boil at Forward Operating Base Mahmudiyah, Iraq

A crab boil is a social event where boiled crabs are eaten, a kind of seafood boil.

== Louisiana and New Orleans ==
Boiled seafood in southern Louisiana tends to be spicier than that found in other parts of the country. Homemade crab boil recipes call for abundant amounts of hot sauce, cayenne pepper, salt, bay leaf, lemon, and garlic. Mustard seeds, coriander seeds, and allspice are popular extra options. Many people will start with a commercial crab boil product and then supplement it with extra pepper. The leading commercial product is Zatarain's which comes in two forms. One is a mesh bag with seasonings inside that will steep into the water. The second is a liquid concentrate that can be added directly to the water. The concentrate form can also be used as a flavor enhancer for soups. Other regional crab boil companies are Tony Chachere's, and Rex Crab Boil. Note that even when boiling shrimp or crawfish, most recipes call for adding crab boil packets as a seasoning.

== Carolinas ==
The Lowcountry boil, Tidewater boil, and Frogmore Stew are variations on the same theme in North and South Carolina.
