= Dane County Farmers' Market =

Producer-only farmers' market in Madison, Wisconsin, U.S.

Coordinates: 43°4′29.06″N 89°23′10.32″W

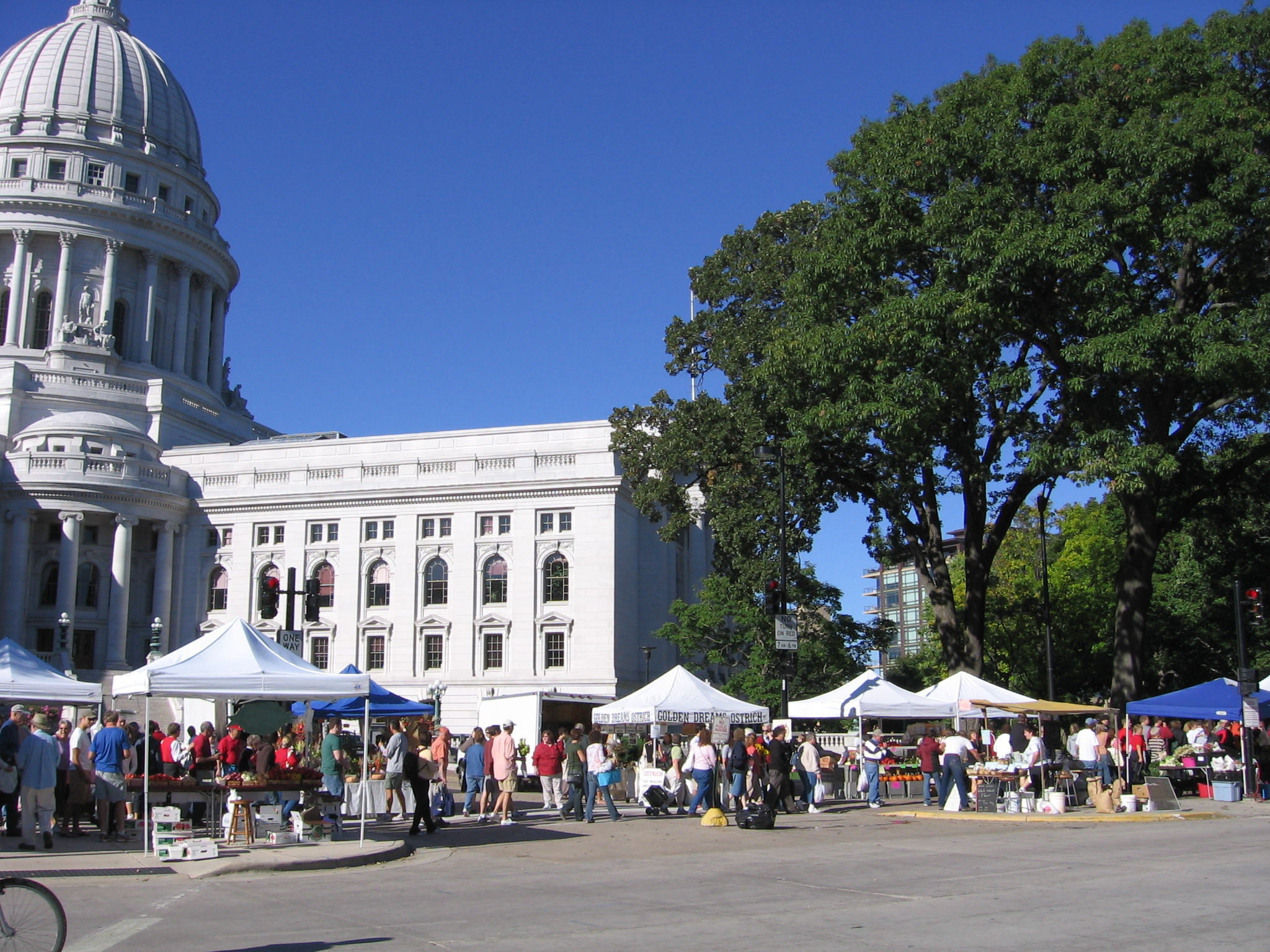

The Dane County Farmers' Market is America's largest producers-only farmers' market. It is held from April to November on Saturday mornings on the Capitol Square in Madison, Wisconsin and on Wednesday mornings on Martin Luther King Jr. Blvd. From November to December, it is held indoors at the Monona Terrace. Since January 2020 it is held at the Garver Feed Mill in Monona through early April, when the outdoor market starts (previously the late winter market was held at the Senior Center on Mifflin St).

Throughout the year, a pool of about 275 vendors of agriculturally-related products from Wisconsin, including farmers, food trucks, artists, and more sell fruits, vegetables, flowers, plants, meats, cheeses, nuts, and specialty products. During the summer, the market hosts 150 vendors who completely encircle the state capitol. USA Today listed it as the top-rated market in the state and it placed fifth for the country in a reader's poll. Fox News said the Farmers' Market was one of the reasons why Madison is a top foodie paradise.

The farmers' market was founded in 1972 by Madison Mayor Bill Dyke, who sought to unite Dane County's urban and rural cultures. It is currently managed by the Dane County Farmers' Market co-op.
