= Devil's Doorway (disambiguation) =

Devil's Doorway may refer to:

== Film ==
- Devil's Doorway, a 1950 American Western film
- Witchboard 2: The Devil's Doorway, a 1993 American supernatural horror film written and directed by Kevin Tenney.
- The Devil's Doorway, a 2018 Irish found footage horror film

== Geography ==
- Devil's Doorway (Wisconsin), quartzite rock formation in Wisconsin

== See also ==
- Devil's door
