= Parfrey's Glen State Natural Area =

State Natural Area in Wisconsin

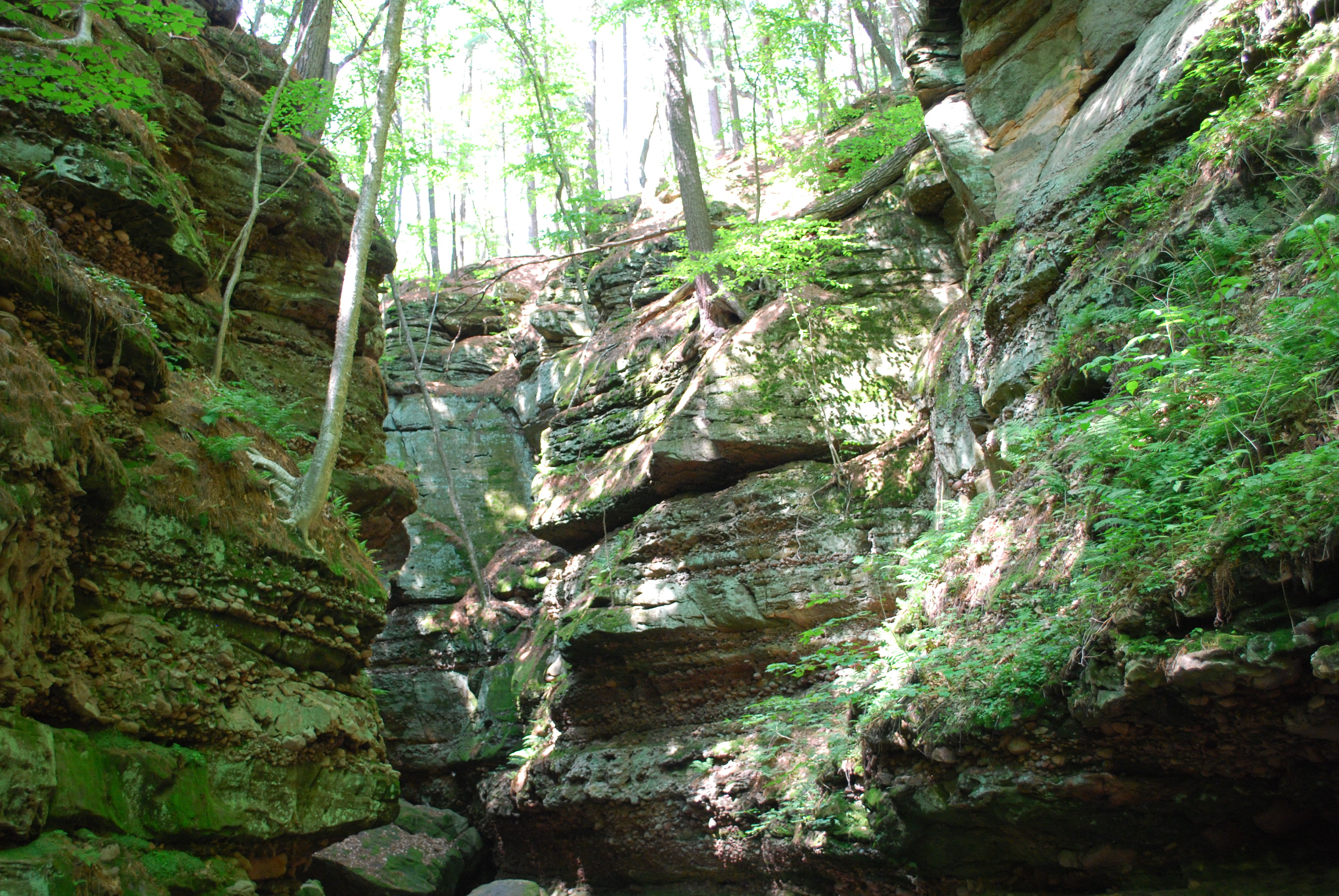

- Location within Wisconsin Location within the United States
- Location: Sauk County, Wisconsin
- Coordinates: 43°25′05″N 89°38′29″W
- Area: 508 acres (206 ha)
- Established: 1952
- Owner: Wisconsin Department of Natural Resources
- Website: Official website
- Wisconsin State Natural Areas

Parfrey's Glen, located within Devil's Lake State Park, is a Wisconsin Department of Natural Resources-designated State Natural Area. The glen is a deep gorge cut through the sandstone of the south flank of the Baraboo Hills. In 1952, it became the first State Natural Area designated in Wisconsin. The valley was named for Robert Parfrey.

== Location and access ==
Parfrey's Glen is located approximately 5 miles north of Merrimac, Wisconsin. Though within the boundaries of Devil's Lake State Park, it cannot be accessed by vehicle from the rest of the park. A trail (1.6 mi roundtrip) leads north into the natural area ending at a small waterfall. The Ice Age Trail also passes through the site. However, heavy rainstorms in 2008 and 2010 destroyed the boardwalk that made up the last part of the trail in the gorge. The boardwalk was not replaced and the trail is now along the streambed for the portion of the hike in the gorge.

== Description ==
Norman Carter Fassett, Chairman of the Natural Areas Committee of the Wisconsin Department of Natural Resources, led the effort to establish Parfrey’s Glen as a scientific research area.

The exposed sandstone walls of Parfrey's glen contain pebbles and boulders of embedded quartzite. The walls were covered with moss and remained moist from seepage before the 2008 floods, which washed away nearly all vegetation in the glen. The mosses and ferns have yet to grow back as of September 2016. The glen has a cool and shaded climate. This results in a flora more typical of northern Wisconsin with yellow birch, mountain maple, and red elder and several rare plant species, including the federally threatened northern monkshood (Aconitum noveboracense) and state-threatened round stemmed false foxglove (Agalinis gattingeri). Additional rare species found here include cliff goldenrod (Solidago sciaphila), and two state-threatened birds, the cerulean warbler (Setophaga cerulea) and Acadian flycatcher (Empidonax virescens). The fast and cold hardwater stream, Parfrey's Glen Creek, flows through the gorge and harbors a rare species of diving beetle (Agabus confusus) and a rare caddisfly (Limnephilus rossi).

== Gallery ==
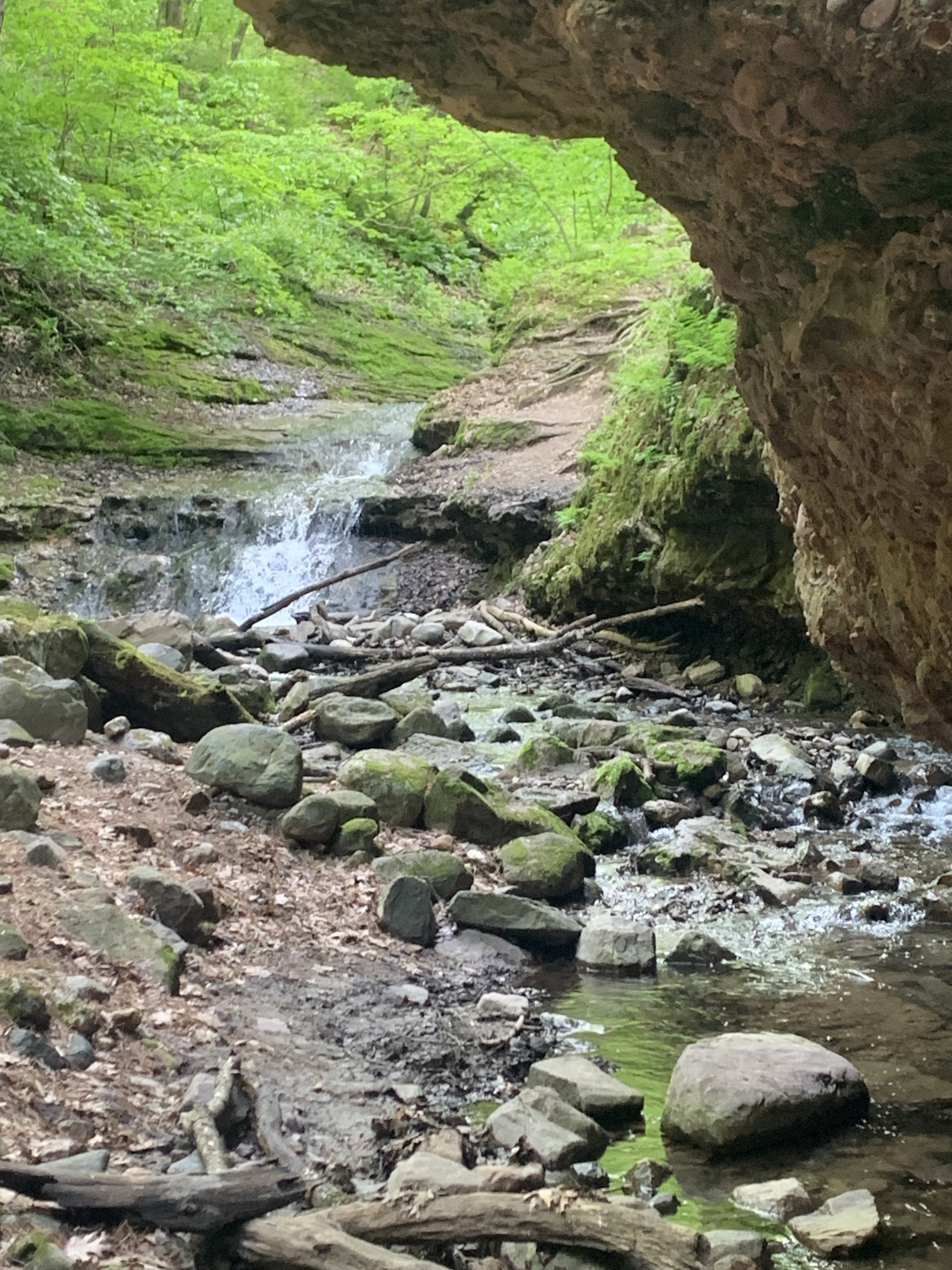
The waterfall at Parfrey's Glen

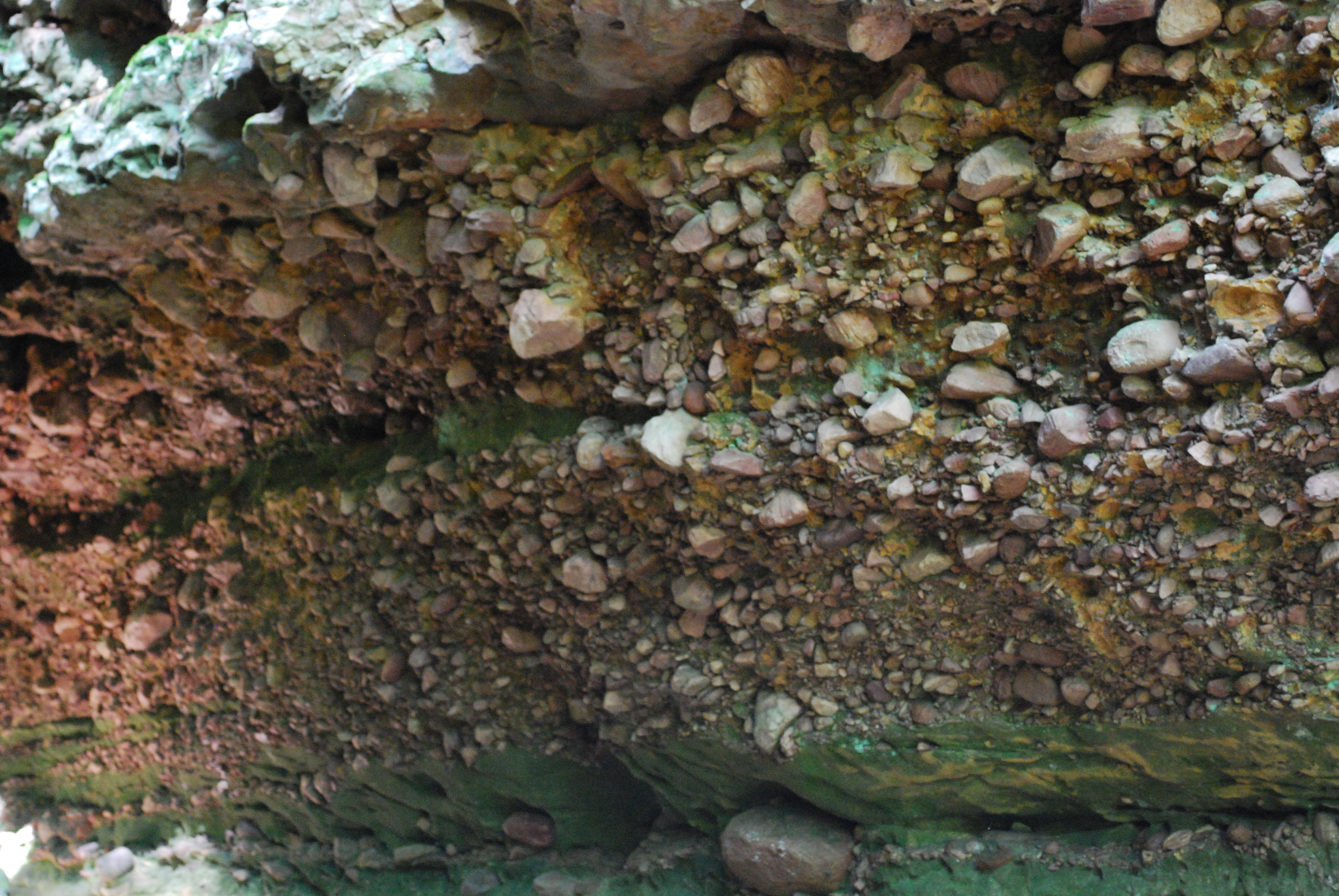
Walls of Parfrey's Glen

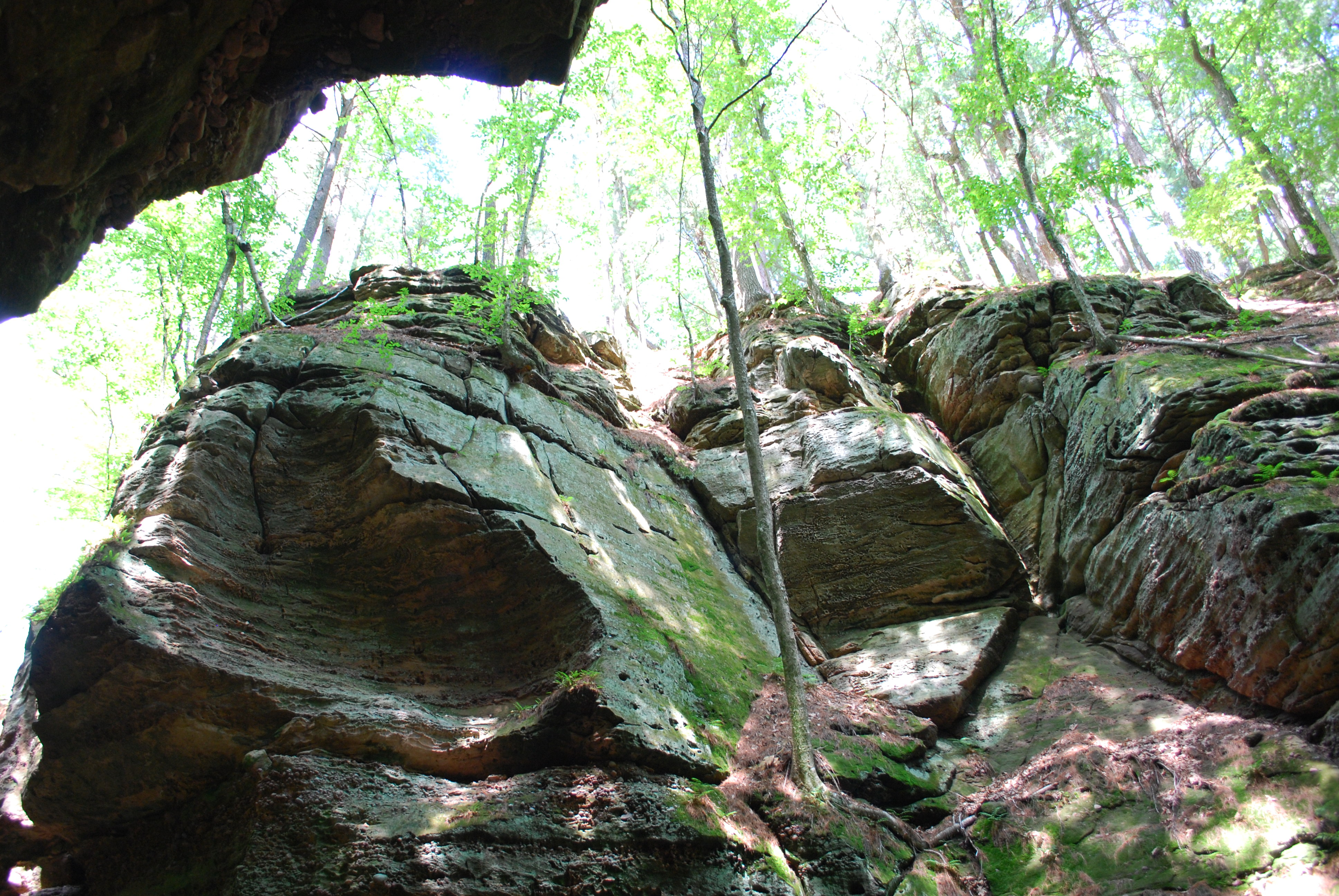
View from the Glen

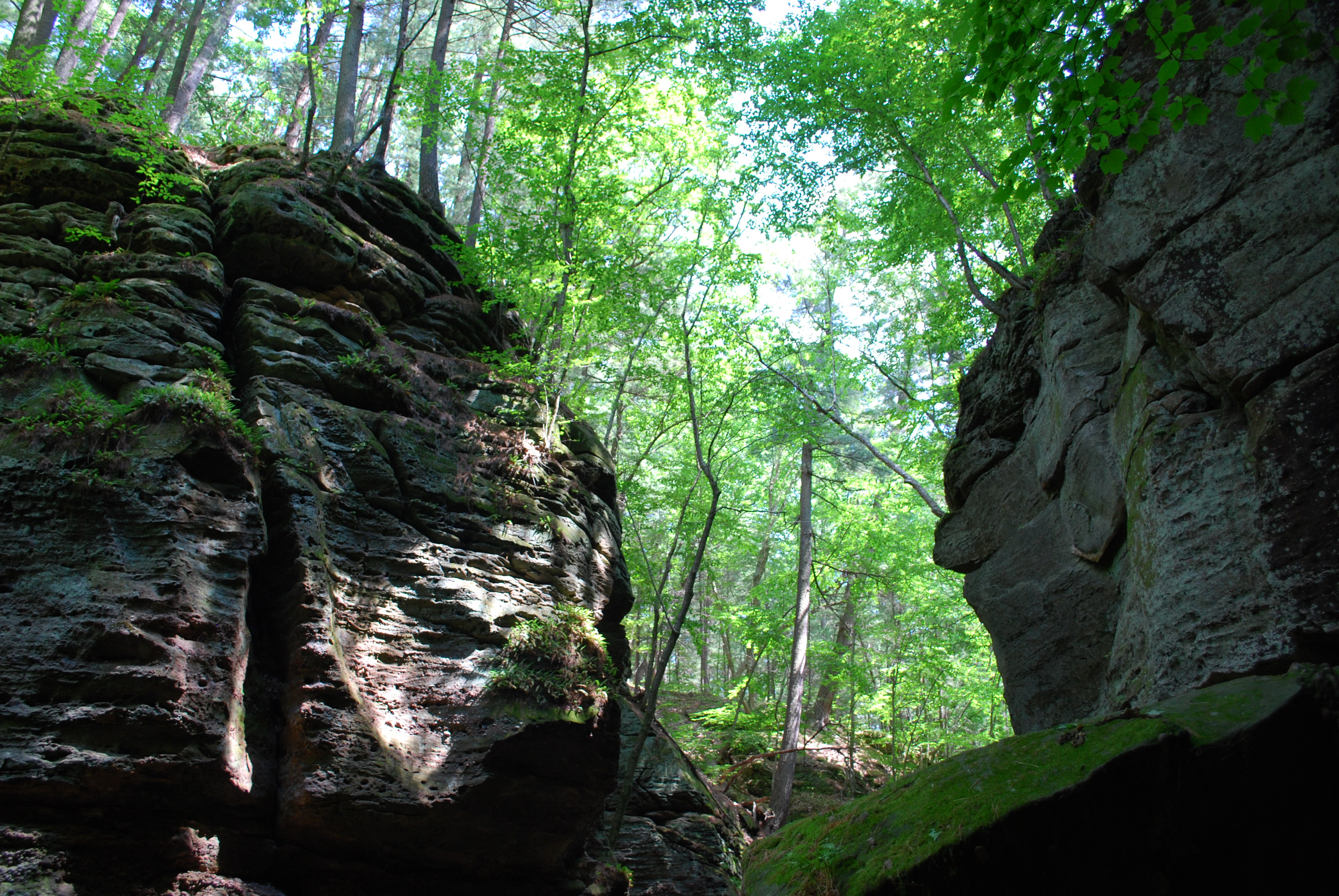
Parfrey's Glen
