= Baraboo Range =

Mountain range in Wisconsin, United States

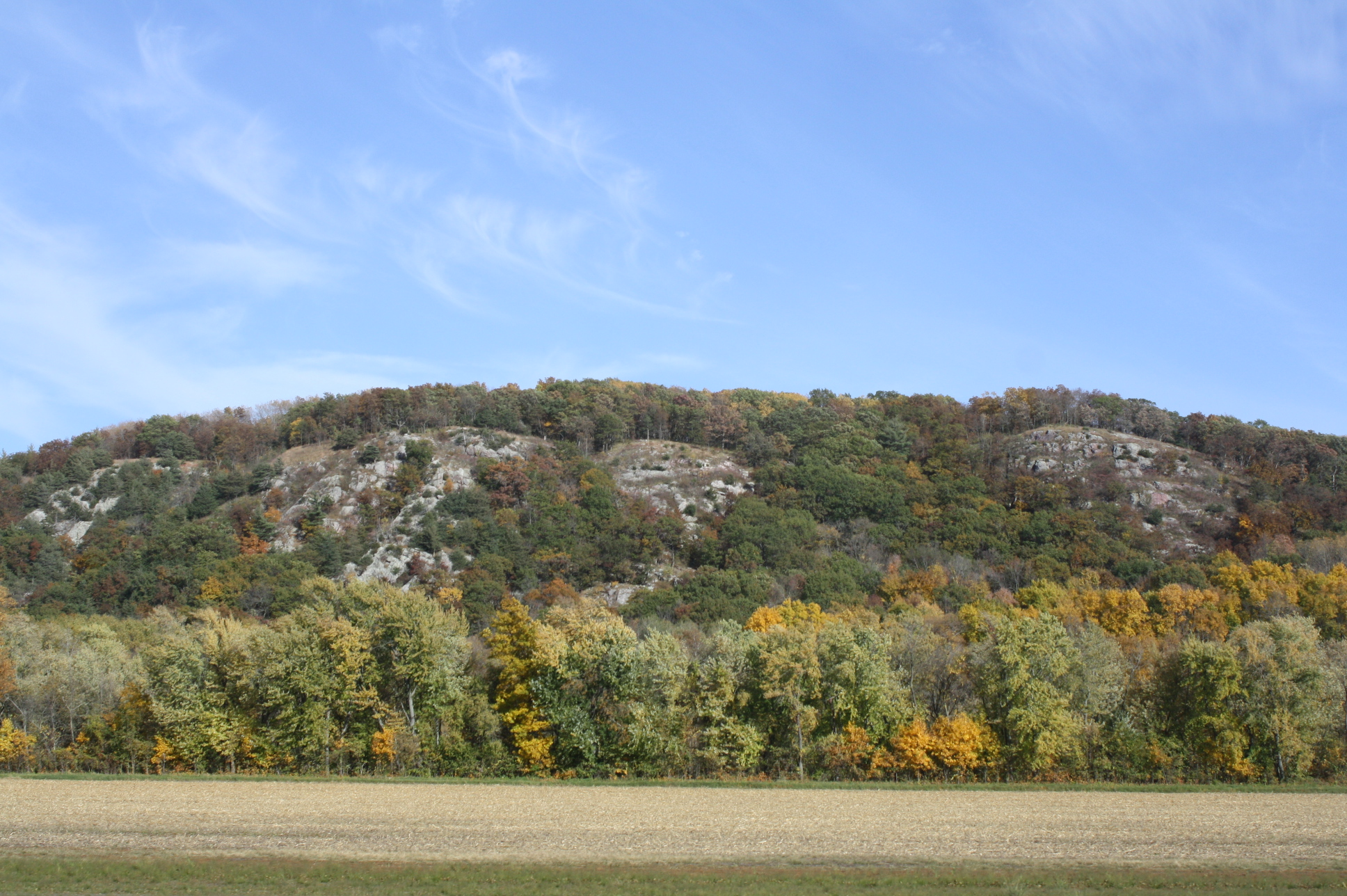
- The range with autumn leaves on WIS 33

- Location within Wisconsin
- Location: Columbia and Sauk counties, Wisconsin
- Nearest city: Baraboo
- Coordinates: 43°25′30″N 89°39′20″W
- Designated: 1980

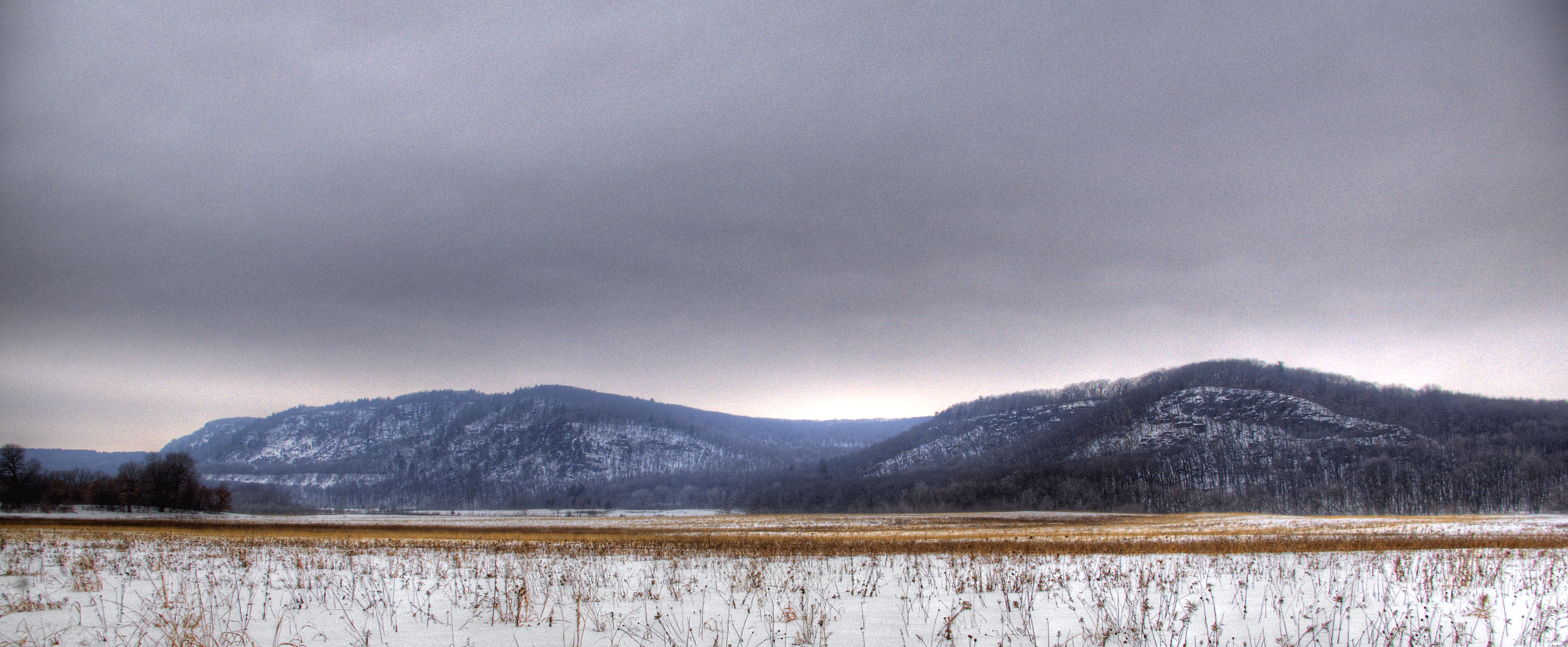
Baraboo Range in winter

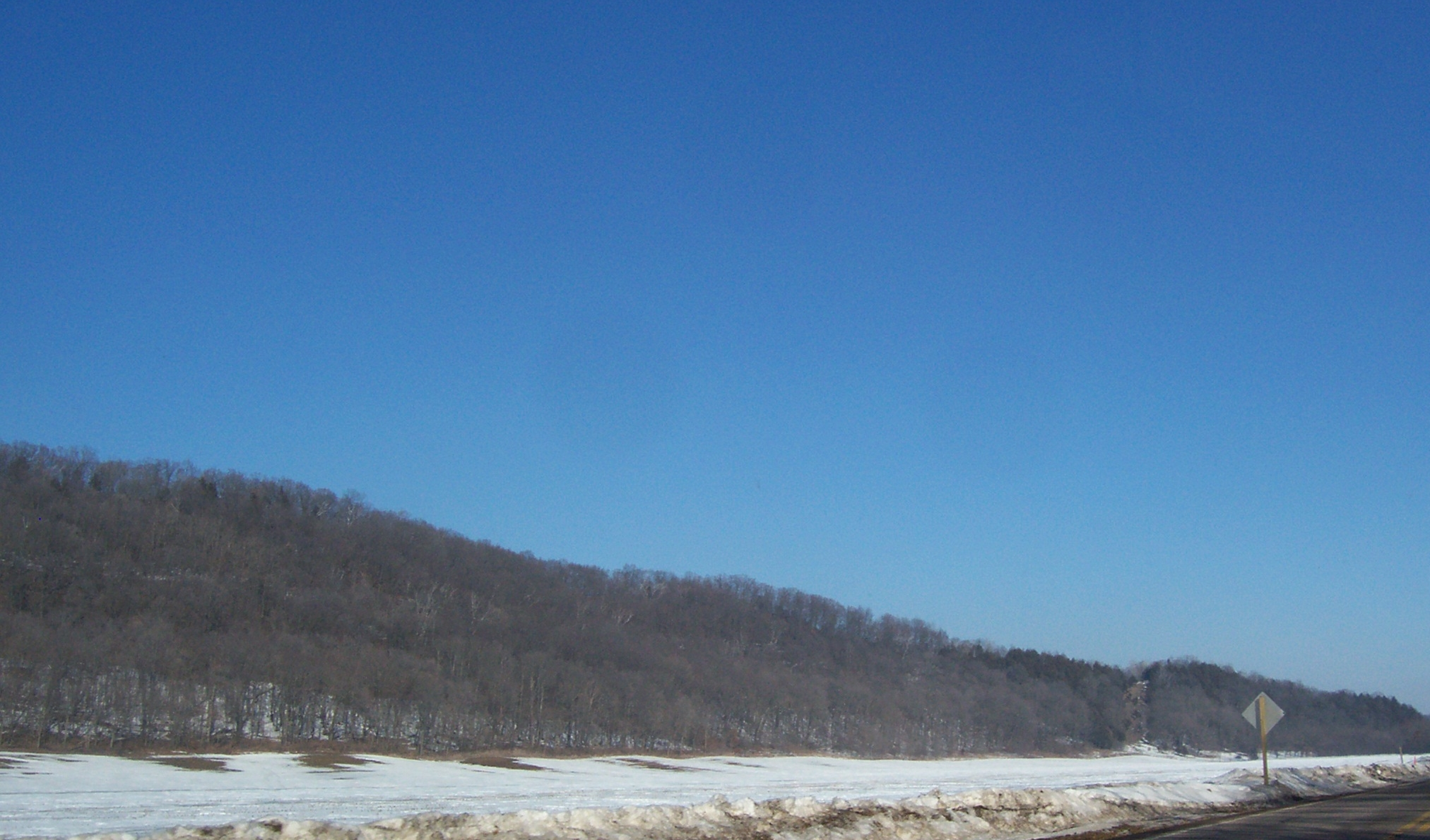
Looking east down the range on Wisconsin Highway 78

The Baraboo Range is a mountain range in Columbia County and Sauk County, Wisconsin. Geologically, it is a syncline fold consisting of highly eroded Precambrian metamorphic rock. It is about 25 miles (40 km) long and varies from 5 to 10 miles (16 km) in width. The Wisconsin River, previously traveling in a north to south direction, turns to the east just north of the range before making its turn to the west towards the Upper Mississippi River. The eastern end of the range was glaciated during the Wisconsinian glaciation, while the western half was not, and consequently marks the eastern boundary of Wisconsin's Driftless Area.

The city of Baraboo is in the center of the valley. The range was designated a National Natural Landmark in 1980.

== Geology ==
These hills were formed from deposited sediment in a shallow sea 1.7 billion years ago. This sediment was metamorphized into quartzite, deformed, then uplifted. These outcrops may have been islands when the region was covered by shallow seas in the Cambrian. The Baraboo River divides the range in half, flowing through Upper Narrows Gorge near Rock Springs and travels onto its confluence with the Wisconsin River downstream from Portage through the Lower Narrows. The Baraboos are composed of resistant Precambrian quartzite (a metamorphic rock) which has formed an erosional remnant, resulting in topographic prominence. The mountains may have formed as long ago as the late Precambrian. These formations were buried by Paleozoic sedimentary strata and are still being uncovered by the erosion of the softer, overlying rocks.

Devil's Lake, the centerpiece of Devil's Lake State Park, was formed from terminal moraines blocking access to its outlet, creating what is today an endorheic lake (i.e., a lake lacking a surface outlet to the world's oceans).

In addition to Devil's Lake State Park, significant sections of exposed quartzite can be found at Ableman's Gorge State Natural Area and Lower Narrows State Natural Area. Ableman's Gorge is a natural gorge featuring unconformable contacts between the quartzite and younger Cambrian sandstone, exposed through a combination of erosion and modern quarrying. Bluffs at Lower Narrows carved by the Baraboo River expose contacts between the quartzite and younger volcanic rhyolite.
