= Devil's Lake State Park (Wisconsin) =

State Park in Sauk County, Wisconsin

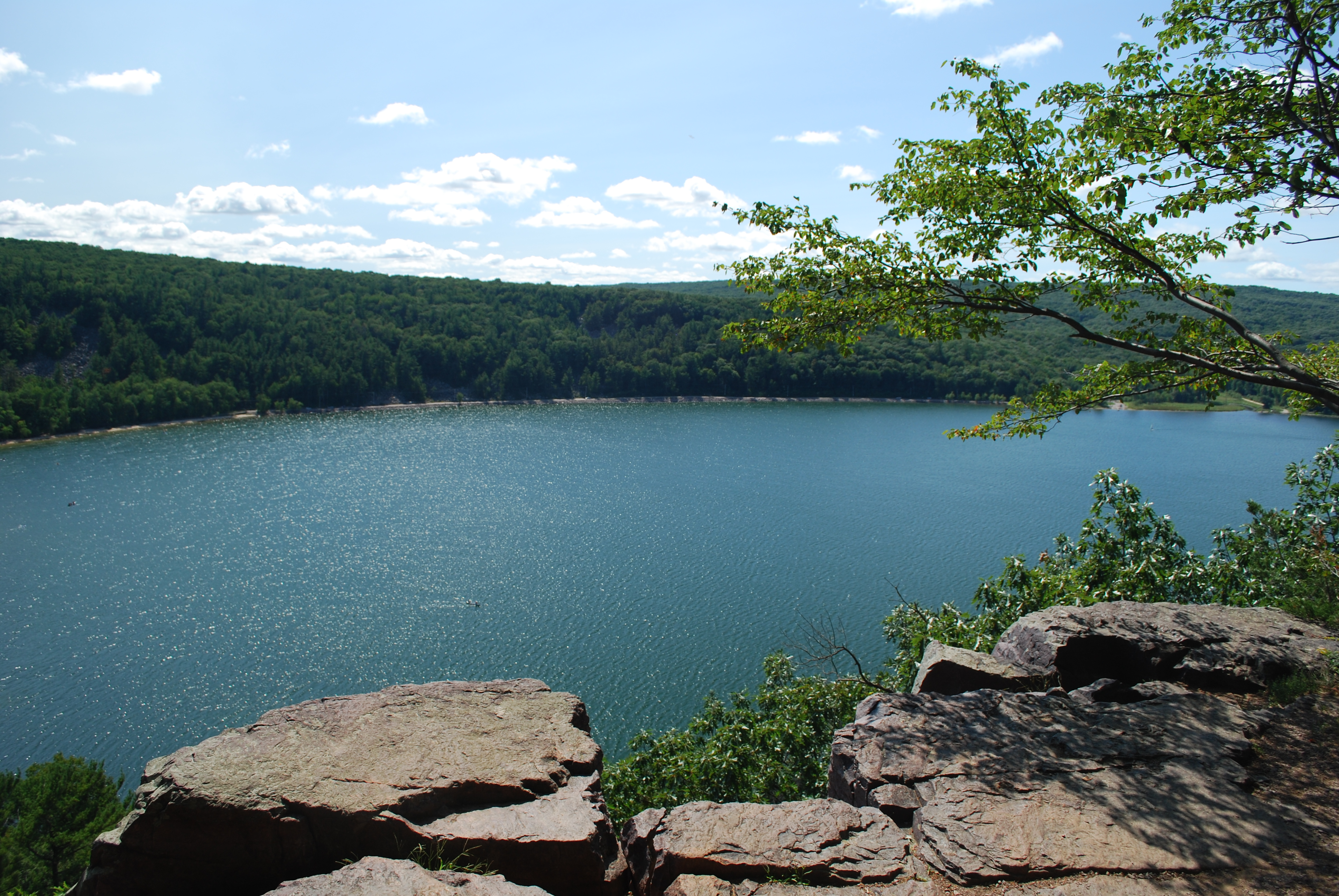
- Devil's Lake from the East Bluff

- Location within Wisconsin Location within the United States
- Interactive map of Devil's Lake State Park
- Location: Sauk County, Wisconsin, United States
- Coordinates: 43°24′53″N 89°42′47″W
- Area: 9,217 acres (3,730 ha)
- Elevation: 961 ft (293 m)
- Established: 1911
- Administrator: Wisconsin Department of Natural Resources
- Visitors: 2,384,606 (DNR est.) (in 2024)
- Website: Official website
- Wisconsin State Parks

Devil's Lake State Park is a state park located in the Baraboo Range in eastern Sauk County, Wisconsin, United States. It is just south of the city of Baraboo, around 35 mi (56 km) northwest of Madison, and is on the western edge of the last ice-sheet deposited during the Wisconsin glaciation. The state park encompasses 9,217 acres (3,730 ha); it is the largest state park in Wisconsin. The state park is known for its 500-foot-high (150 m) quartzite bluffs along the 360-acre (150 ha) Devil's Lake, which was created by a glacier depositing terminal moraines that plugged the north and south ends of the gap in the bluffs during the last ice age approximately 12,000 years ago. The sand at the bottom of Devil's Lake is thought to be deposited by glaciers.

There are many quartzite rock formations, such as Balanced Rock and Devil's Doorway, throughout the park. Effigy mounds are also located throughout the park. The park contains approximately eleven miles of the 1,200-mile (1,900 km) Ice Age Trail. It is consistently ranked as the most visited Wisconsin state park. During the fall, the park's brilliant foliage makes it a popular attraction. Parfrey's Glen, Wisconsin's first state natural area, is managed by Devil's Lake State Park and located just east of the park.

== History ==
The original inhabitants of the area around the lake date back much further than when the European settlers first discovered the land. There is proof that humans occupied the land between 12,000 and 16,000 years ago, but Ho-Chunk historians speak of people living there longer than 300,000 years ago. The area may have been inhabited originally between 12,000 and 16,000 years ago due to the fact that this was the time the last of the glaciers had receded from the area. Many Native tribes throughout Wisconsin inhabited the lands. They called the lake various different names, such as Tewakakak or Minnewaukan, which translate to spirit lake in various Native American Languages.

The area where the park now stands was first settled by pioneers in the mid-1800s. By the start of the 20th century, the area had become a popular vacation destination for wealthy families from Chicago and Madison. The first hotel was established in 1866, 50 years before the park was founded.

The park was founded in 1911. It was home to five resorts, two of which were perched on the west bluff. Few traces of these structures remain, though footings and foundational structures can be found along the South shore and near Prospect Point on the West Bluff. There were also many private residences in the west and south shores of the lake, only four of which remain. At various times the lakeshore hosted water slides, lodges, ferry boat launches and golf courses. The clubhouse of one course sat on the current location of the park's nature center. By the 1940s, the hotels were all closed, and the park was retreating to its former natural self.

From 1934 to 1941, approximately two hundred members of the Civilian Conservation Corps resided in a work camp. These young men, led by Alonzo W. Pond, built many of the trails, buildings, and benches still in use today.

In 1974, the National Park Service declared the Southern portion of the Baraboo Hills a National Natural Landmark. The Nature Conservancy also designated it as one of the "Last Great Places," one of only 77 such designations in the world.

In 2020, a man was stabbed to death along the Grottos Trail. Several witnesses reported seeing a man running from the scene of the murder, but he remains unidentified. As of 2024, the case remains unsolved.

== Features ==
=== Geology ===
Loess covers most of the hills and forms the parent material of a brown silt loam soil. The lake is surrounded by a mixed conifer-deciduous forest and the Baraboo Hills are also home to one of the largest contiguous hardwood forests in the Midwest.

Several moraines are featured in the park, another side effect of glaciation. The North Glacial Moraine is well covered by the north shore developments. The parking lots, concession building and the picnic shelter all sit atop the moraine. This moraine forms the northern border of Devil's Lake. This moraine is approximately 80 feet (24 m) thick. The Southeast Glacial Moraine is located between the East Bluff-South Face and the South Bluff. The Group Camp is located atop the moraine. It is best seen from the Roznos Meadow parking area along State Route 113. The moraine is approximately 130 feet (40 m) thick.

Hiking up the East Bluff of Devil's Lake Park

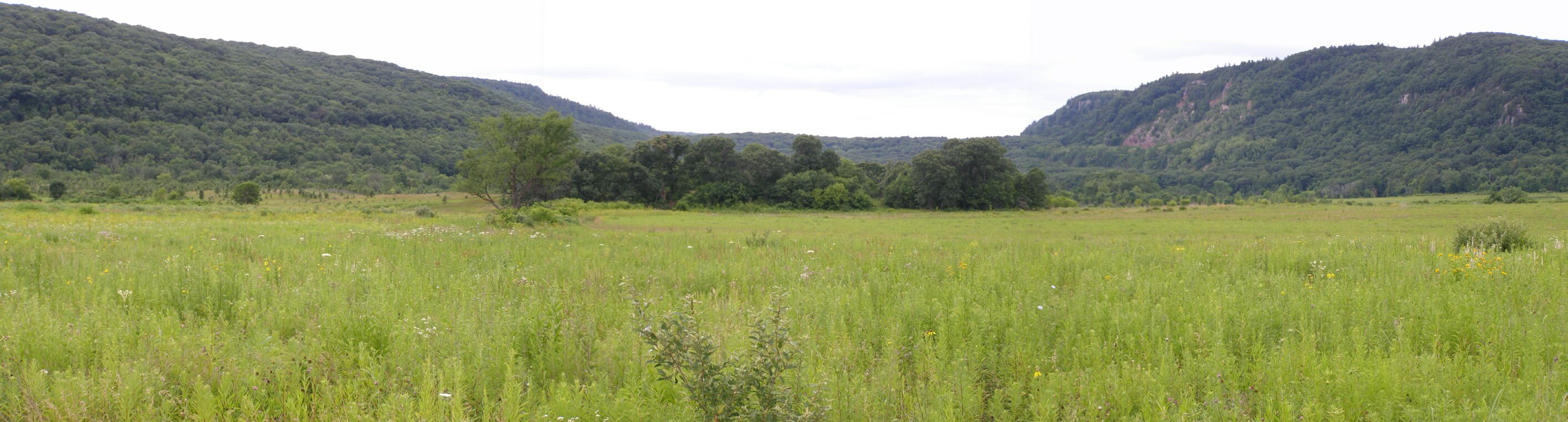
Southeast moraine between the South Bluff and the East Bluff-South Face

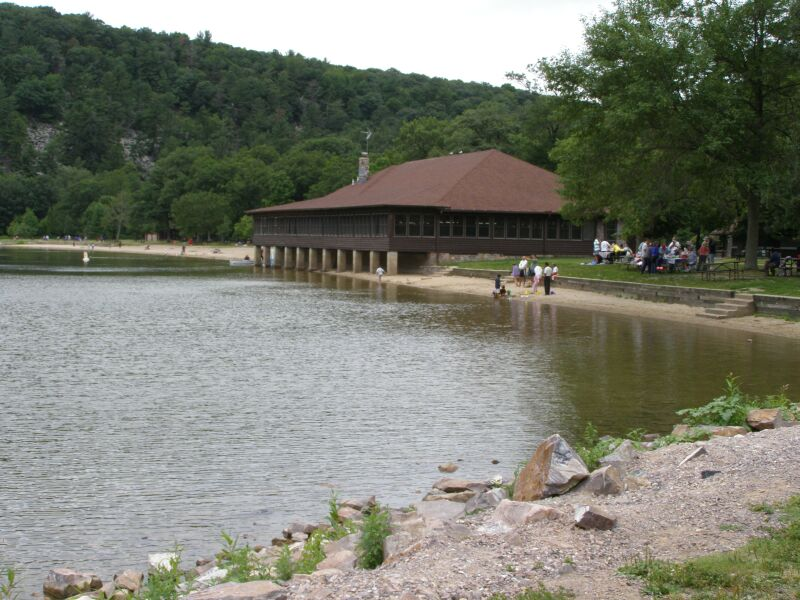
The "Chateau" atop the North Glacial Moraine

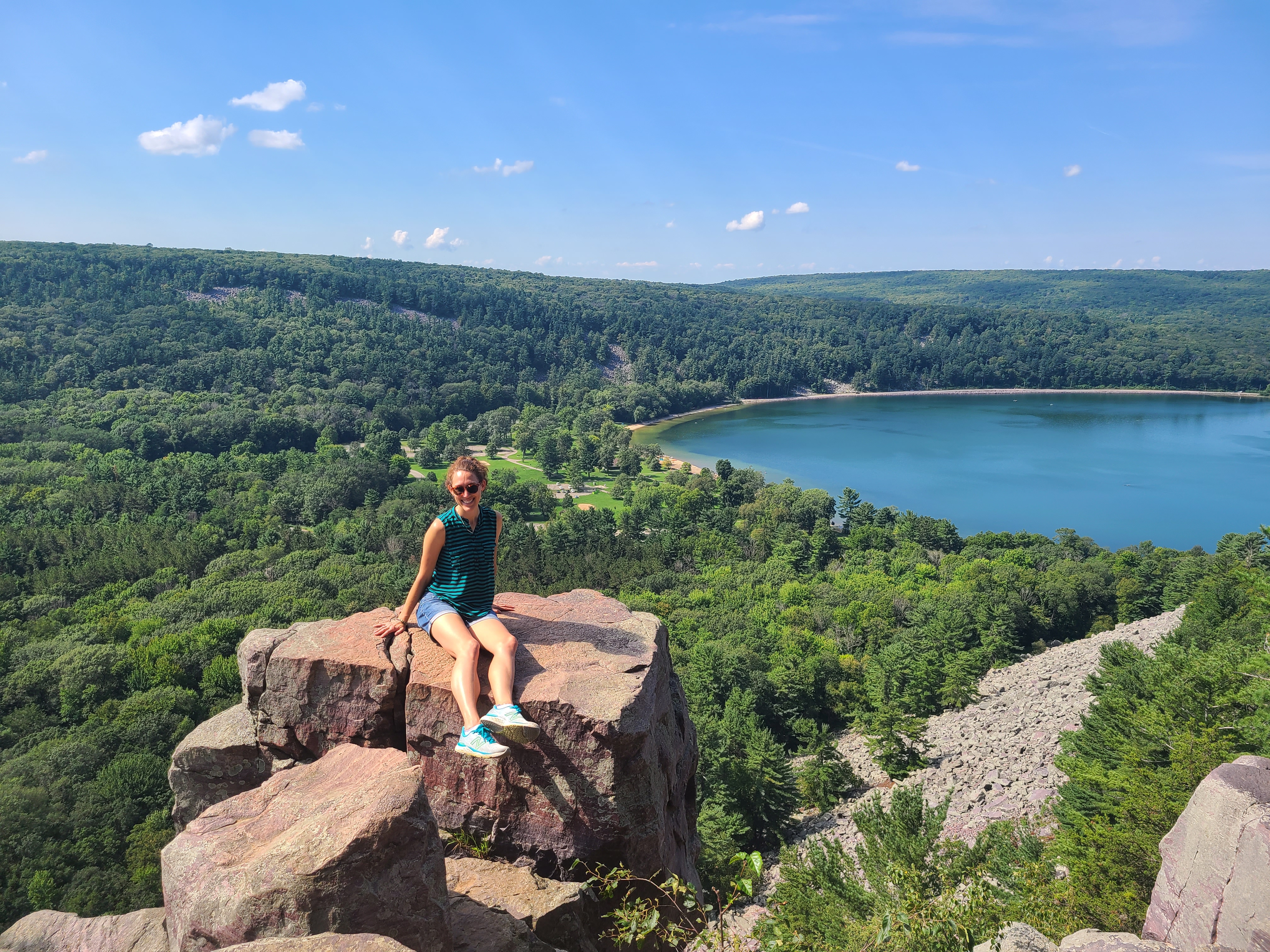
Eastern View of Devil's Lake from above

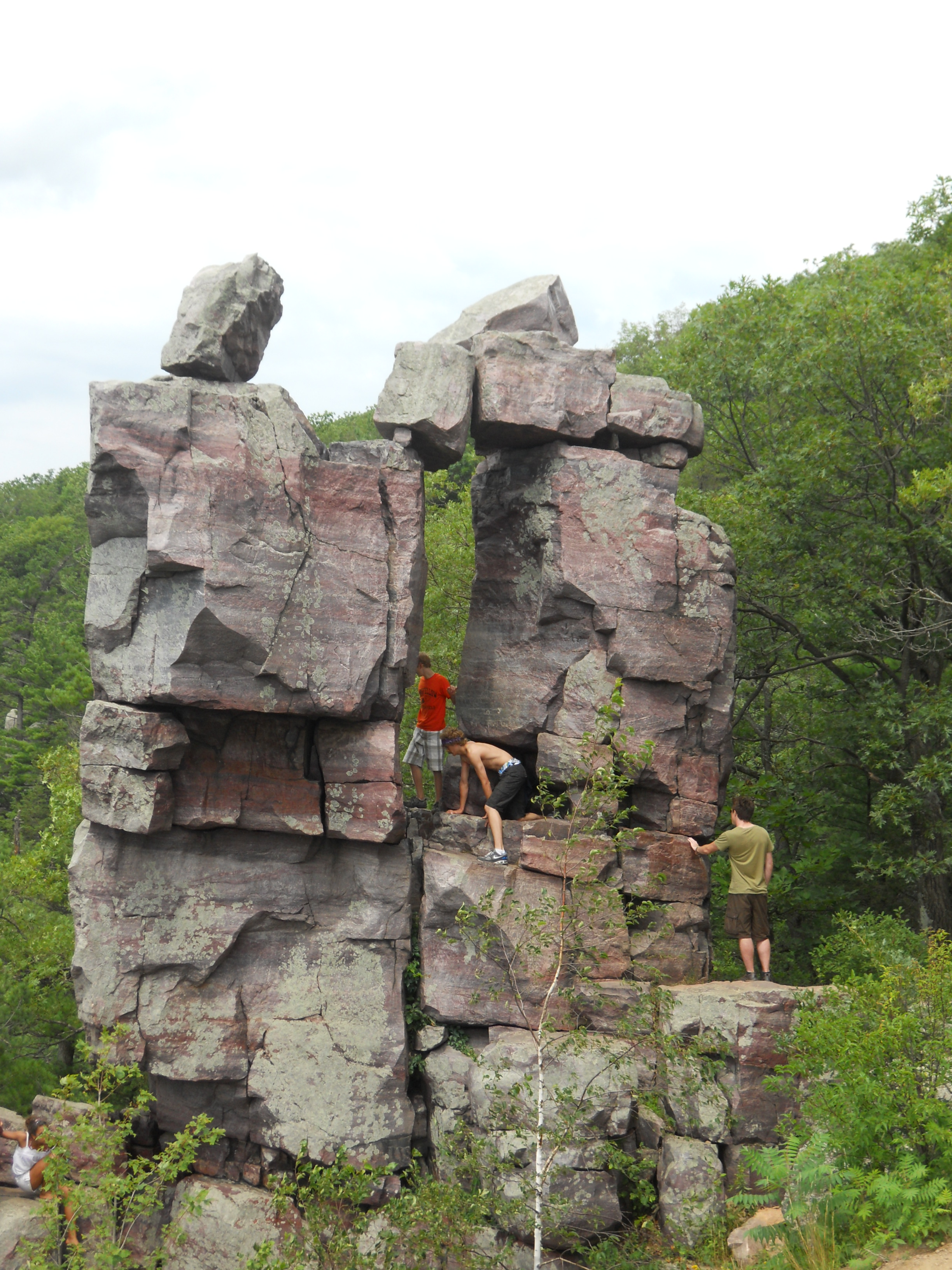
Devil's Doorway rock formation

View of Devil's Lake from Devil's Doorway

Due to the long geological history of Devil's Lake and the Baraboo Range, the area has been used in geological research for years. The lake itself is rectangular in shape and is a little over a mile long from north to south and a half mile from east to west. It has many cliffs, unique rock formations and a variety of animal and plant species. One of the most notable features of the park is the presence of large talus slopes on three sides of the lake.

=== Buildings ===
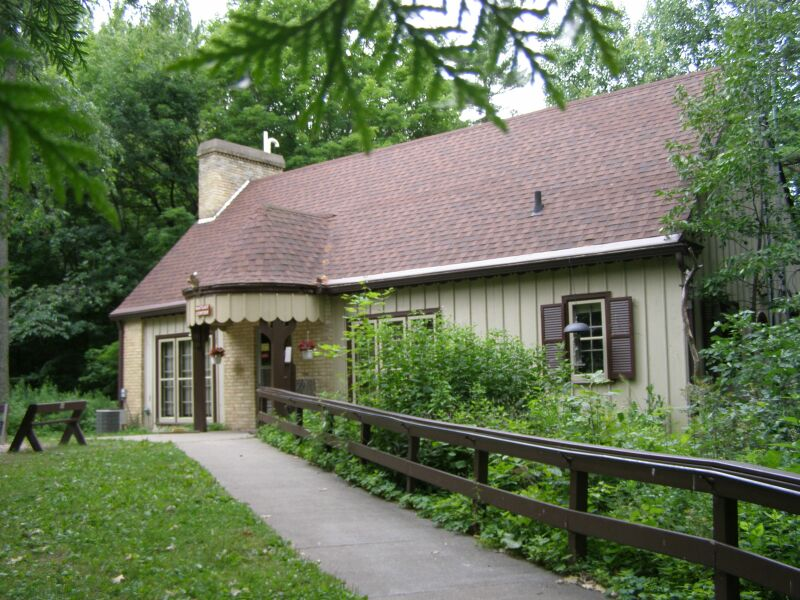
Nature Center, near the main entrance road

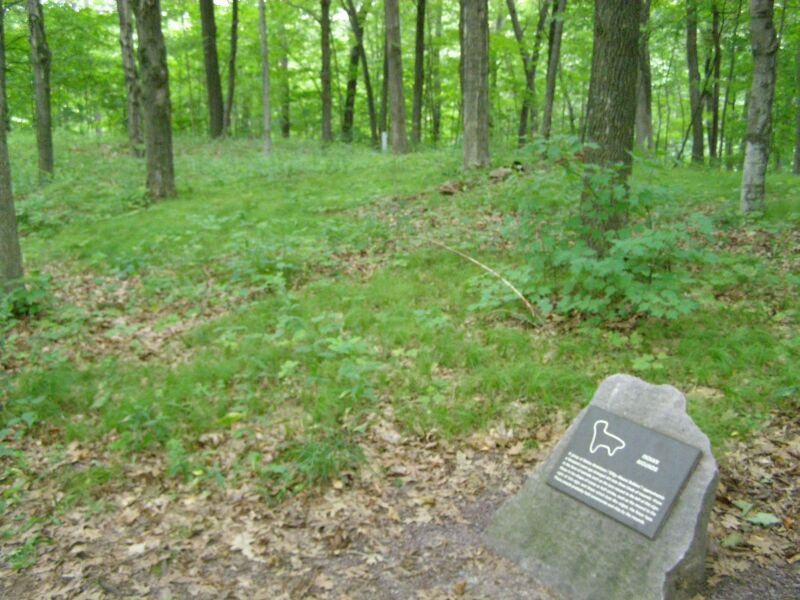
Lynx mound near the nature center

The state park includes many buildings on its land. The exhibits at the park's nature center focus on the geology and natural history of the area. Public nature programs are offered in the summer, as well as evening programs on Saturday nights in the Northern Lights Amphitheater. The nature center also has many historical photographs that come from as far back as the 1800s. They also have many displays of examples of the flora and fauna that can be found throughout the park.

=== Mounds ===
The park has several American Indian mounds. Across the parking lot from the nature center are effigy mounds built in stylized animal shapes, such as a lynx and a sparrow. In front of the concession building is a linear mound, one of several geometric mounds in the park. These mounds were used as ancient burial sites by early North Americans. The nature center offers courses on the history of the effigy mounds.

== Recreational activities ==
=== Hiking ===
There are 29 miles (47 km) of hiking trails in Devil's Lake State Park. There are trails ranging from handicapped-accessible paved trails, to steep, difficult hiking trails, to rigorous, off-trail routes. The highest point is at Prospect Point, on the West Bluff, 500 feet (150 m) above Devil's Lake.

- Balanced Rock Trail (0.4 miles)
- C.C.C. Trail (0.3 miles)
- Devil's Doorway (0.1 miles)
- East Bluff Trail (1.7 miles)
- East Bluff Woods Trail (1.3 miles)
- Grottos Trail (0.7 miles)
- Group Camp Trail (0.5 miles)
- Ice Age National Scenic Trail (All parts – 13.7 miles)
- Johnson Moraine Loop Trail (2.8 miles)
- Parfrey's Glen Trail (0.7 miles)
- Potholes Trail (0.3 miles)
- Roznos Meadow Trail (1.8 miles)
- Sauk Point Trail (4.5 miles)
- Steinke Basin Loop Trail (2.4 miles)
- Tumbled Rocks Trail (1 mile)
- Upland Loop Trail (3.8 miles)
- West Bluff Trail (1.4 miles)

=== Biking ===
Devil's Lake State Park has four miles of off-road – the Upland Trail Loop. There are no official paved road-bike trails in the park, although many people enjoy riding several miles on all the paved campground roads.

=== Camping ===
There are four popular campgrounds at the park containing 407 campsites all together:

- Northern Lights Campground
- Quartzite Campground
- Ice Age Campground
- Group Campground

Northern Lights Campground features a decent sledding hill.

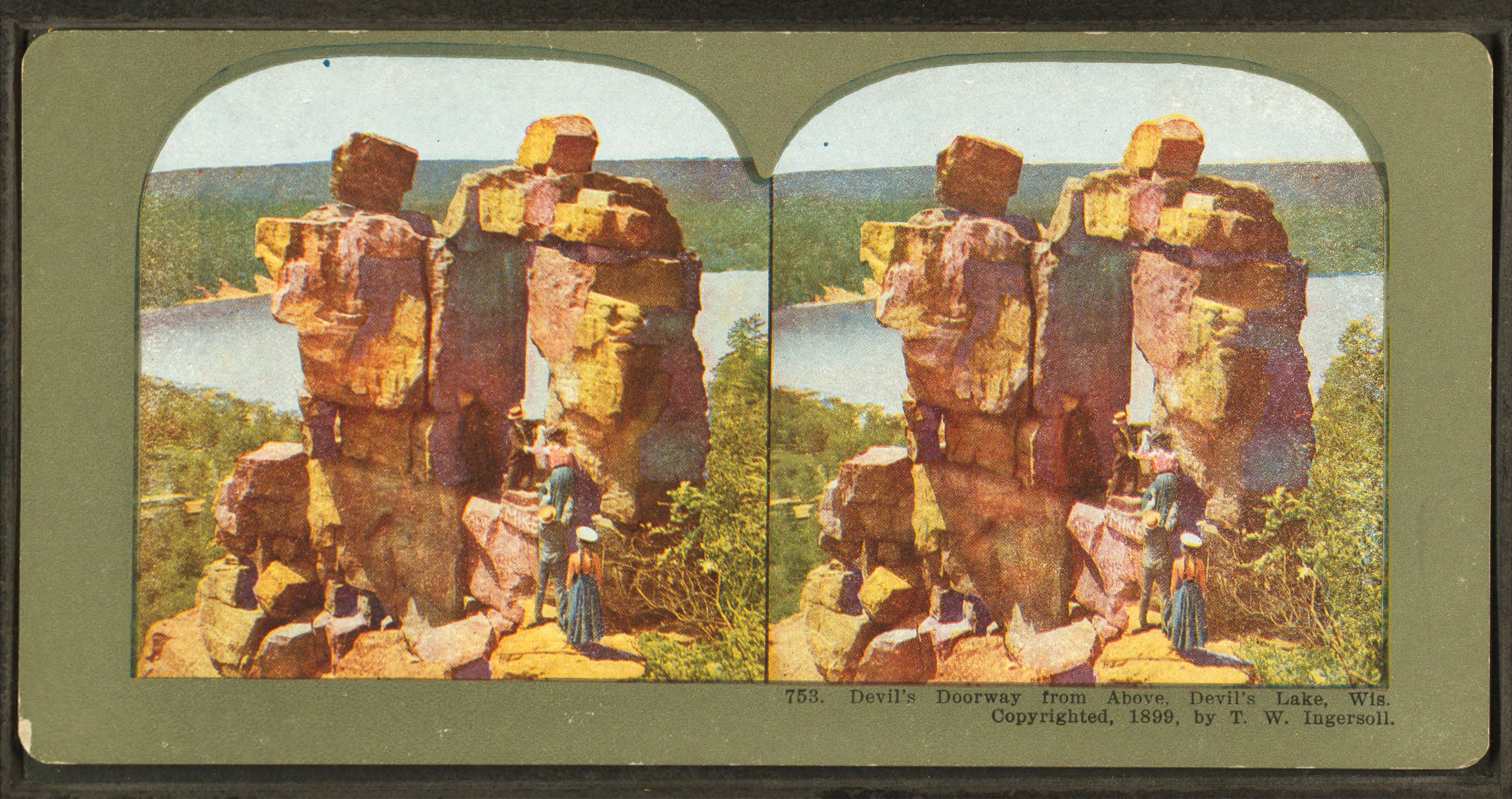
Stereoscopic view of Devil's Doorway by Truman Ward Ingersoll

=== Rock climbing ===
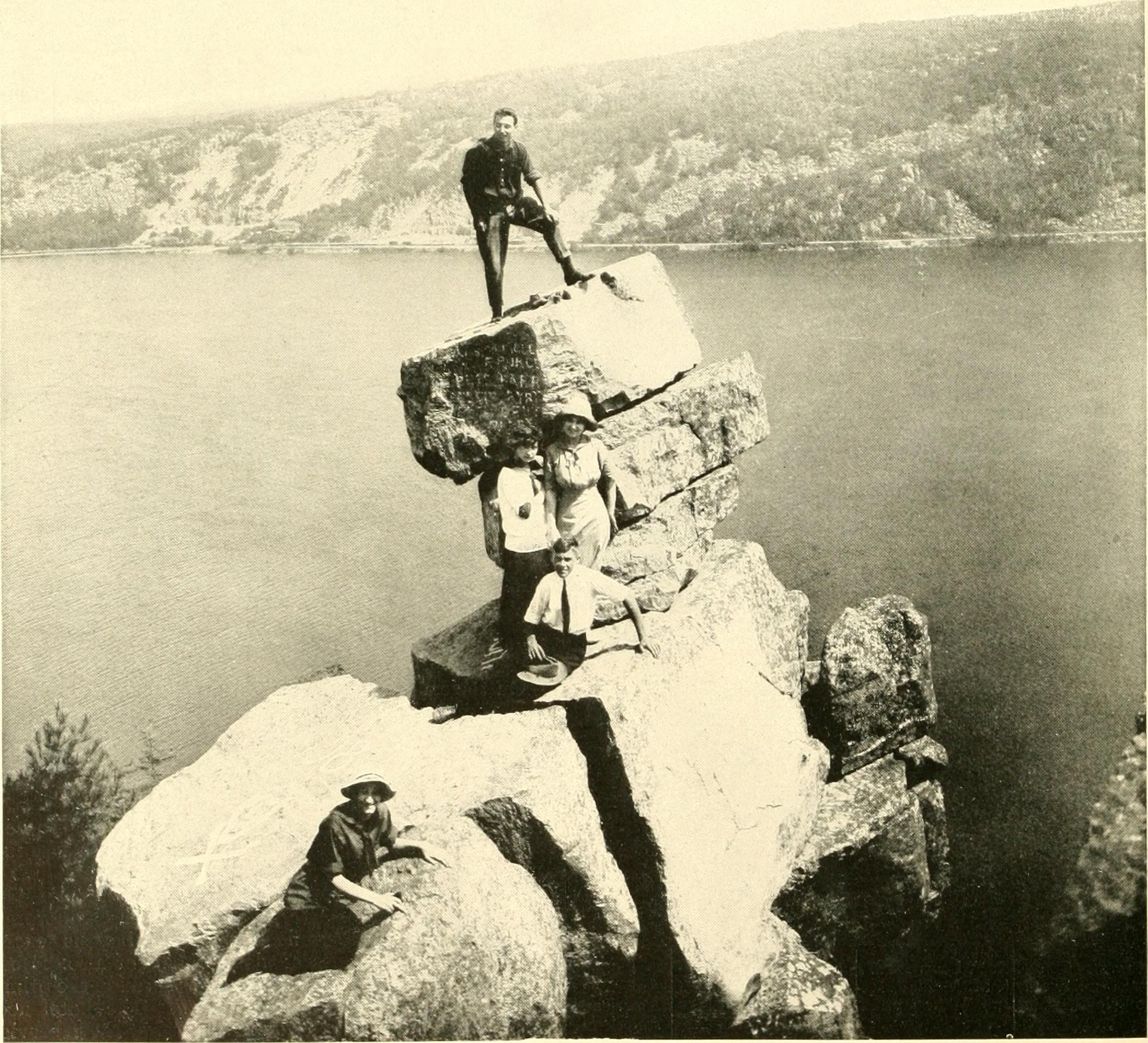
Devil's Lake, published 1914

The geology of the Baraboo Hills surrounding Devil's Lake makes it one of the premier rock climbing areas in the Midwest, with climbs of varying difficulty. The Baraboo Hills are primarily quartzite, which is solid enough to climb. Most outcroppings in the region, especially in the Driftless Area, are composed of sandstone or limestone, which are too brittle to climb safely.

Devil's Lake has enjoyed a history of rock climbing since early ascents in the 20th century. Climbers such as the Stettner Brothers, and members of the hard-climbing group "DLFA" have frequented the park extensively. Guidebooks cover more than a lifetime's worth of unique "routes" and sub-areas of the park. For climbers, unique names for each major bluff formation is important in finding specific climbs and areas. The climbing style and protection system at Devil's Lake is known for its difficult, glassy rock and traditional fall-protection methods and anchors.

There have been occasional deaths, injuries, and emergency rescues among the rock climbers at Devil's Lake.

==== East Bluff ====
The "East Bluff" refers to the Eastern outcroppings in the park, and includes many sub-areas for climbers, including "Doorway Mass" which are climbs surrounding the famous Devil's Doorway formation, "Balanced Rock Wall" near the famous Balanced rock, and an area off of the CCC trail known as the "East Ramparts" which is the most popular due to the high concentration of sheer, unbroken cliff faces to climb.

==== West Bluff ====
The west side of the park features climbing areas such as "Stettner Rocks", The Cleo Amphitheatre, and the "Lost Face". The Cleo Amphitheatre features the classic climb of a 25 ft freestanding spire known as "Cleopatra's Needle"

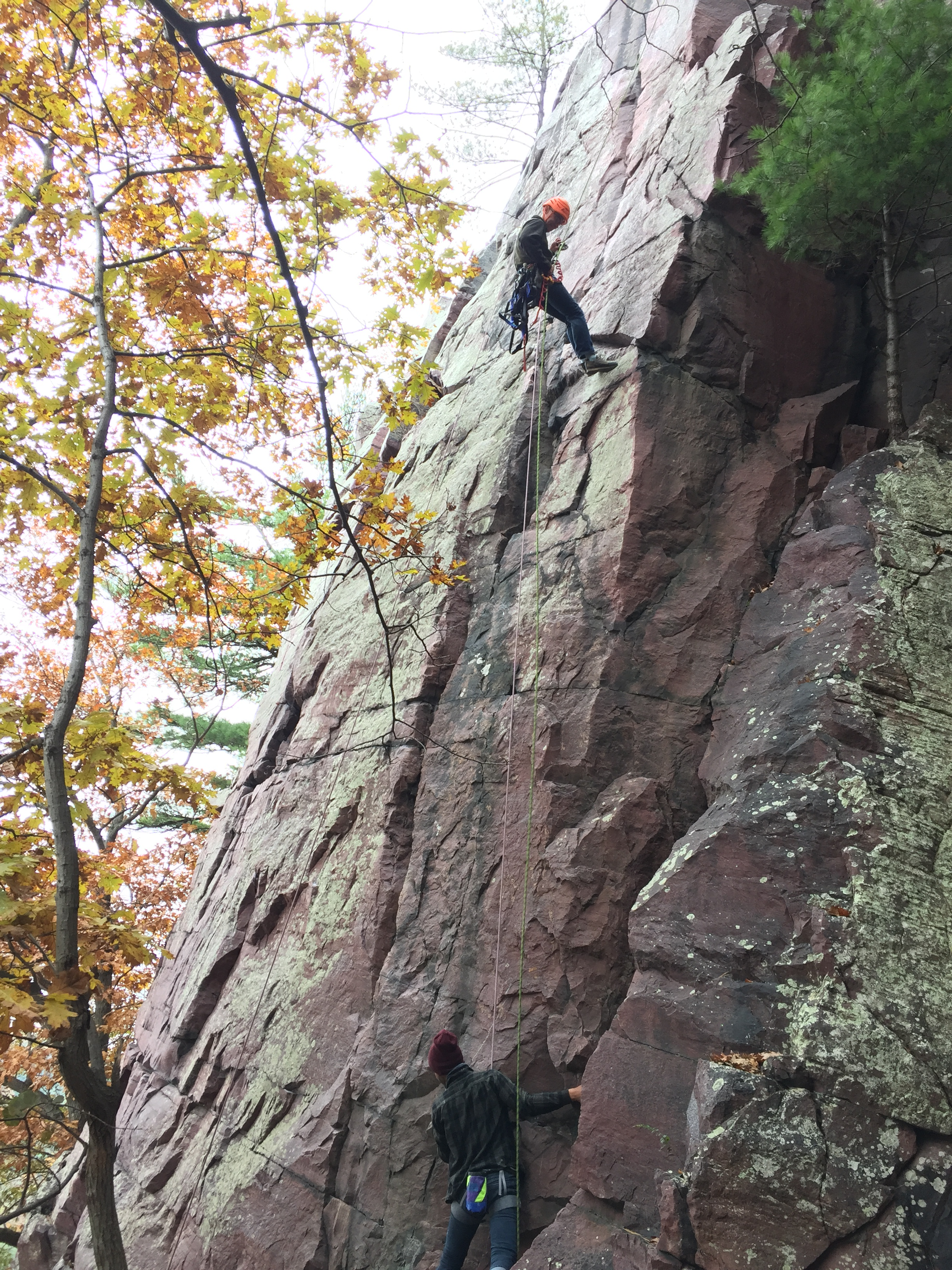
The climb "Cheatah" is a classic line on what is known as Bill's Buttress in the East Bluff

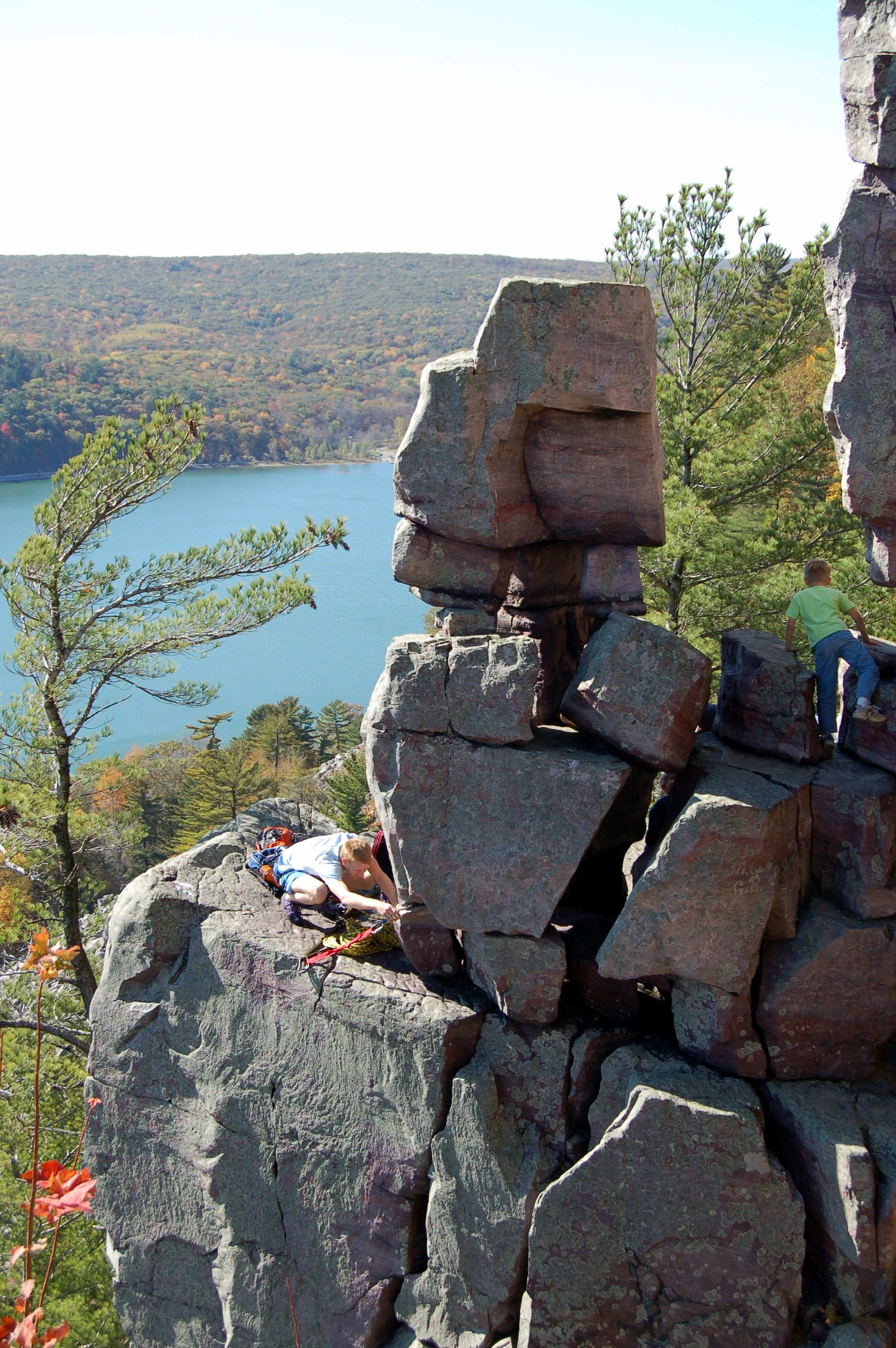
Chimney Rock

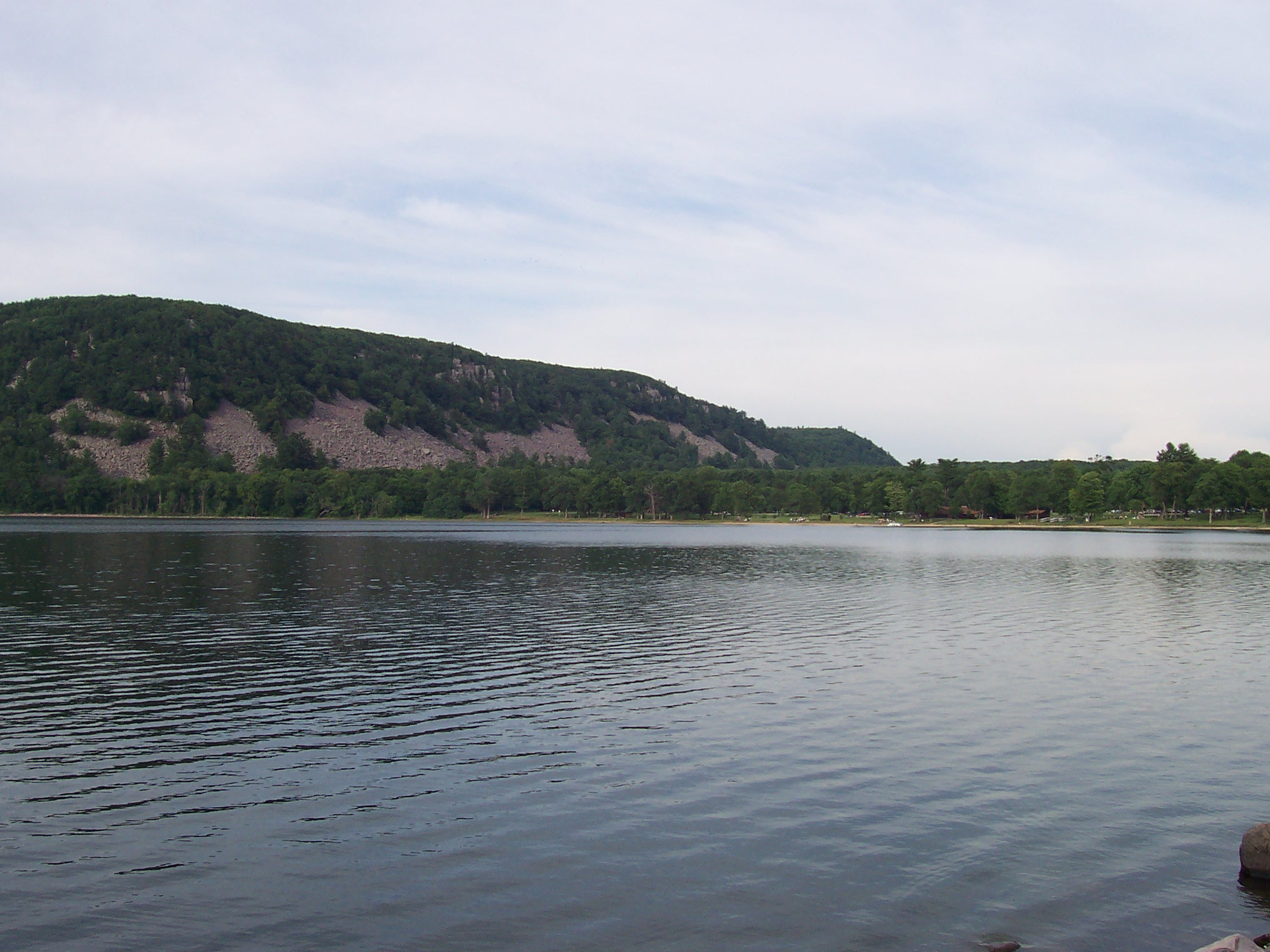
Beach on south end of Devil's Lake

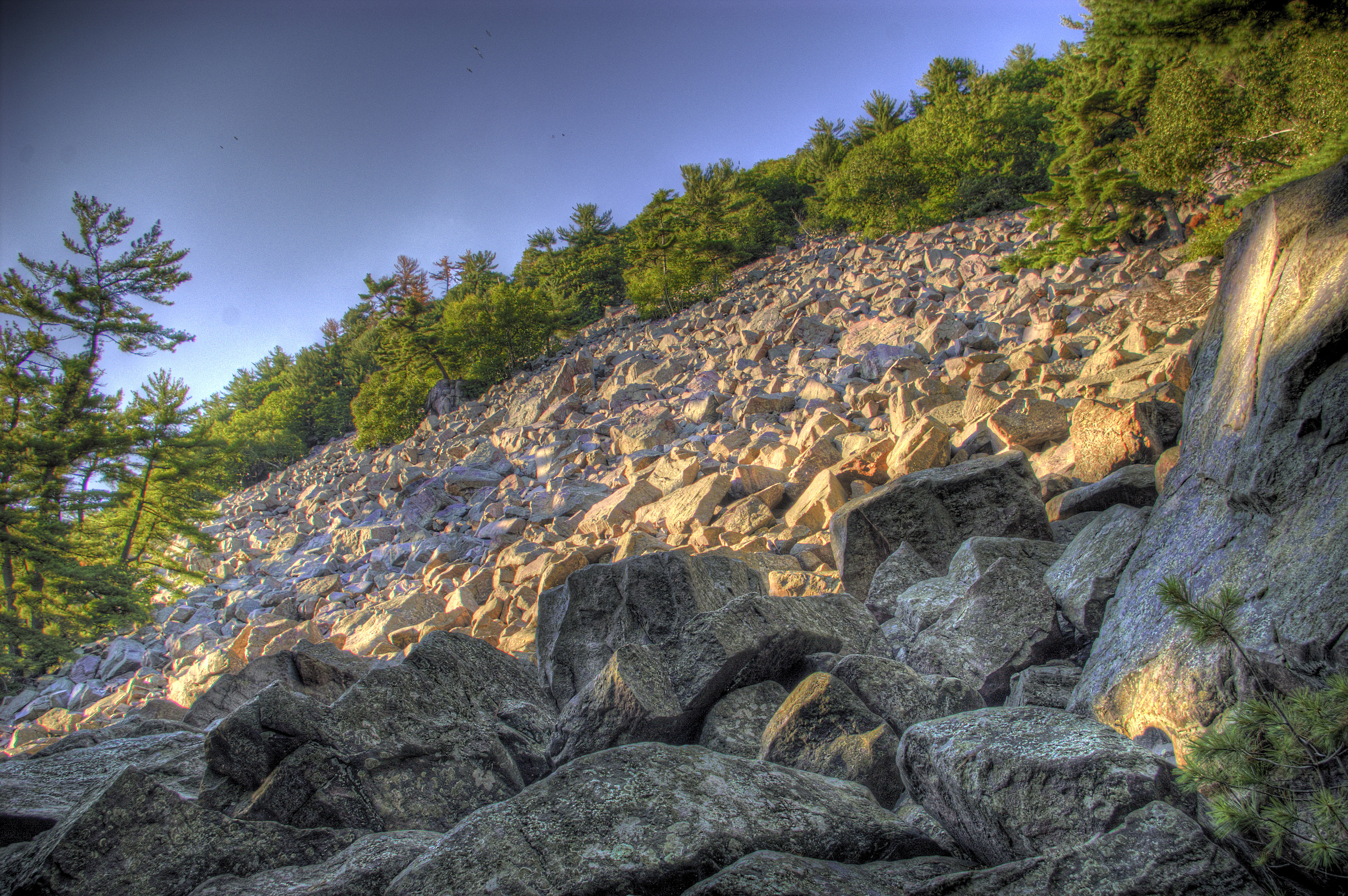
Boulder field on Eastern bluff at Devil's Lake

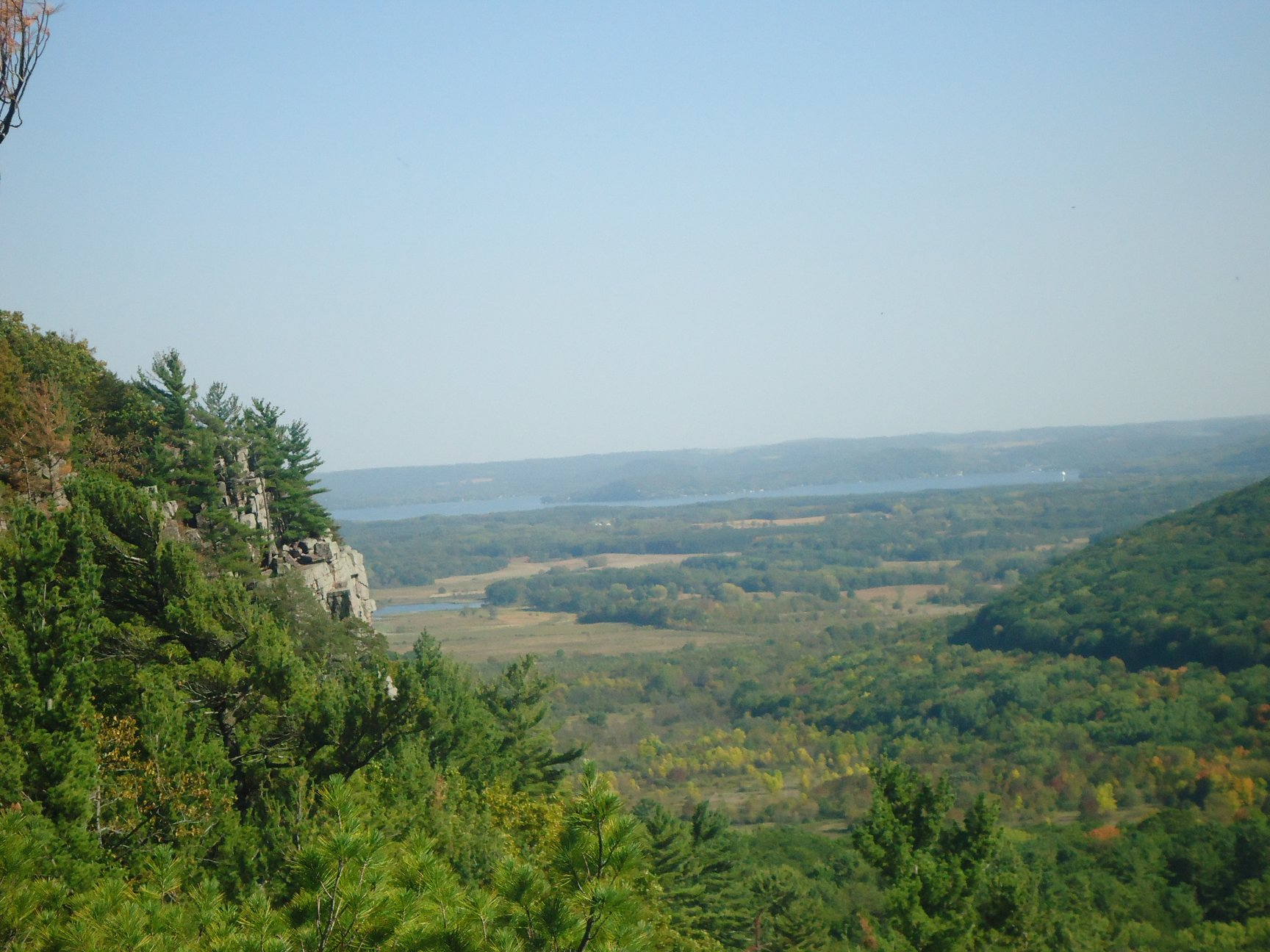
View of Baraboo Hills from top of one of the mountains

== Wildlife ==
Wildlife abounds at Devil's Lake State Park. Among the flora and fauna at Devil's Lake are:

- 58 species of butterflies, including the rare white admiral
- 29 species of fish, mostly native, excepting the trout, carp and white bass
- 5 species of salamander, 1 species of toad, and 10 species of frogs
- 4 species of turtles and 10 species of snakes, including the timber rattlesnake
- 228 bird species have been recorded in the park, 105 of which have been recorded nesting in the park
- 4 species of owl – screech owl, great horned owl, barred owl, saw-whet owl
- Up to 40 mammal species have been reported in the park, including white-tailed deer, black bear, raccoon, skunk, badger, weasels, mink, otter, bobcat, mountain lion, gray and red foxes, coyote, gray wolf, beaver, porcupine, woodchuck, muskrat, voles, opossum, rabbit, shrews, moles, mice, rats and four species of bats

== Climate ==
Devils Lake State Park

Climate chart (precipitation, max. and min. temperature)
J	F	M	A	M	J	J	A	S	O	N	D
73 −5 −12	74 −6 −13	78 2 −5	154 16 2	130 21 9	202 24 16	82 25 18	99 23 17	83 21 12	95 14 5	59 6 −3	68 −2 −11
- █ Average max. and min. temperatures in °C
- █ Precipitation totals in mm
Imperial conversion
J	F	M	A	M	J	J	A	S	O	N	D
2.9 23 10	2.9 21 9	3.1 36 23	6.1 61 36	5.1 70 48	8 75 61	3.2 77 64	3.9 73 63	3.3 70 54	3.7 57 41	2.3 43 27	2.7 28 12
- █ Average max. and min. temperatures in °F
- █ Precipitation totals in inches

== See also ==
- Badger Army Ammunition Plant
- Ice Age Trail
