= Devil's Doorway (Wisconsin) =

Rock formation in Wisconsin

Geography of Devil's Doorway
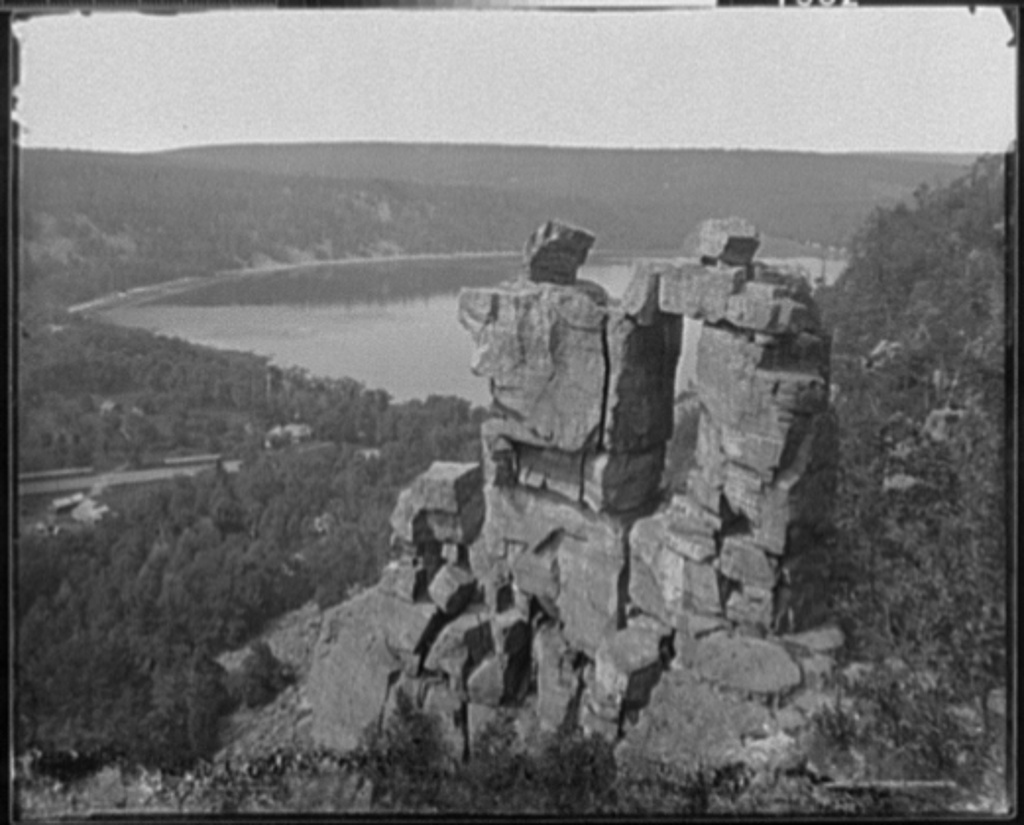
- Devil's Doorway c. (1898)

- Continent: North America
- Region: East North Central states
- Coordinates: 43.4141°N 89.7202°W
- Largest lake: Devil's Lake (Wisconsin)

Devil's Doorway is a rock formation in Devil's Lake State Park. The signature feature of the park, it is a popular spot for climbing and photographs. The quartzite rocks that make up Devil's Doorway form a doorway-shaped natural rock arch.

== Description ==
Devil's Lake view from Devil's Doorway rock formation

Devil's Doorway is a main attraction in Devil's Lake State Park in Wisconsin. The park is 9,217 acres (3,730 ha) and Devil's Lake is 360 acres (150 ha). The formation, more than 31 ft (9.4 m) high, is named for its resemblance to a doorway or a stone arch, with two separate columns of rock connected by other rocks at the top. Devil's Lake is visible from the vantage point at the formation.

The rocks that form Devil's Doorway are quartzite, consisting of tightly packed grains of sand. The geological formations in the area are estimated at 1.6 billion years old. Devil's Doorway was created by many years of water both freezing and expanding in cracks in the rocks.

== History ==
Devil's Doorway is located at the southeast corner of Devil's Lake in Devil's Lake State Park. It is found on The East Bluff Trail. Between 1909 and 1910 The State Park Board acquired 740 acres (300 ha) for the park and by 1911 the board had secured a total of 1,100 acres (450 ha). When the park was established in 1911, there was much graffiti painted on the rocks of the formation. A postcard from 1901 showed that someone had painted the initials "F.H.R." and "T.R.R." on the face of the rocks. A 2016 article in the Wisconsin State Journal stated that graffiti is reported three or four times every year and volunteers quickly remove it.

The Milwaukee Journal referred to the rock formation as one of "Wisconsin's natural wonders" and a "Wisconsin treasure". World Atlas has said the formation is the signature feature of Devil's Lake State Park. The most photographed rock formation in the park, it stays in position because of the weight of the quartzite—165 lb (75 kg) per cubic foot. Visitors often climb on the Doorway and take photographs; as safety gear is not always used, some visitors have been seriously injured or killed after falling.

== Gallery ==
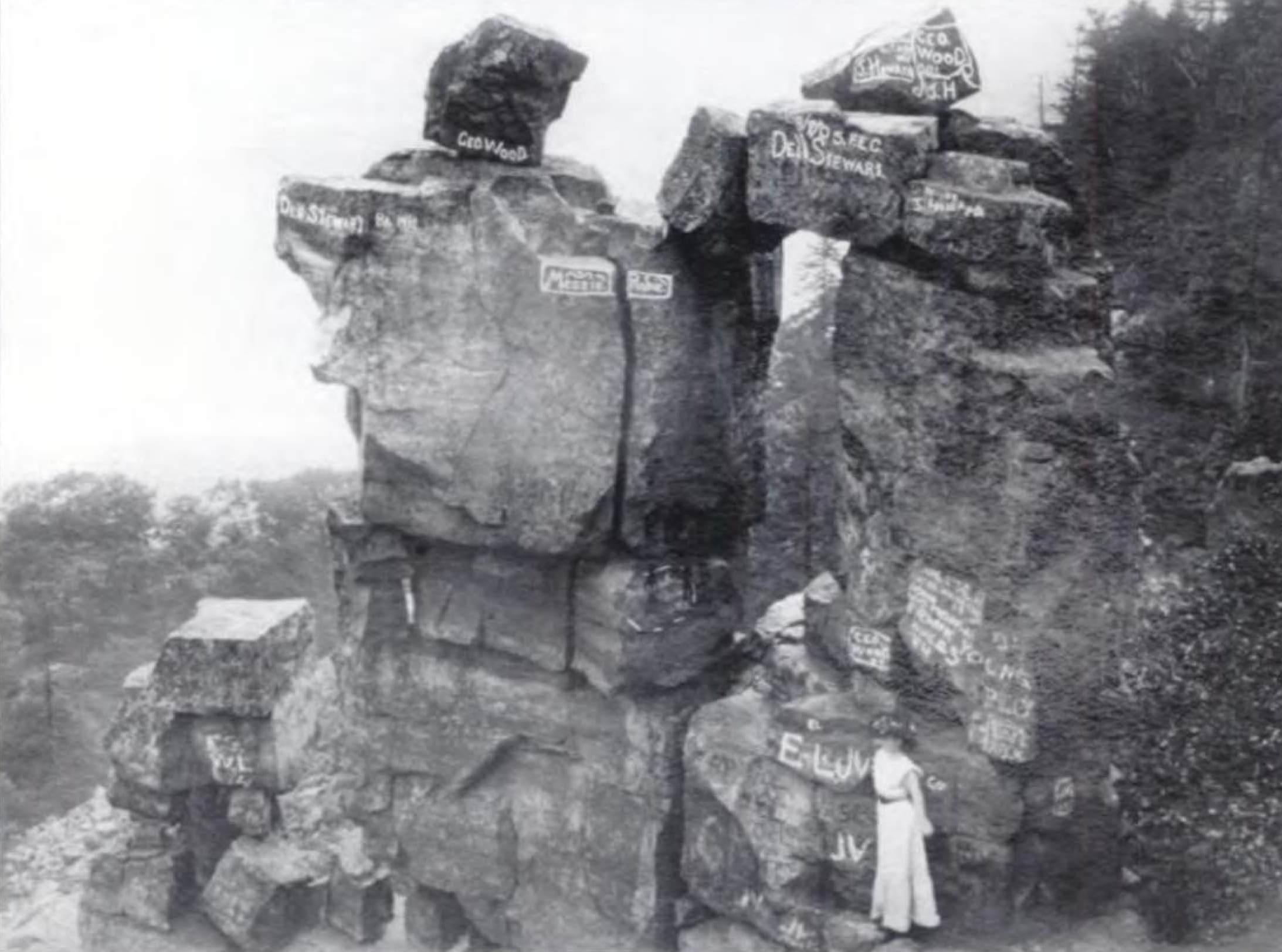
Devil's Doorway with graffiti (circa 1911)

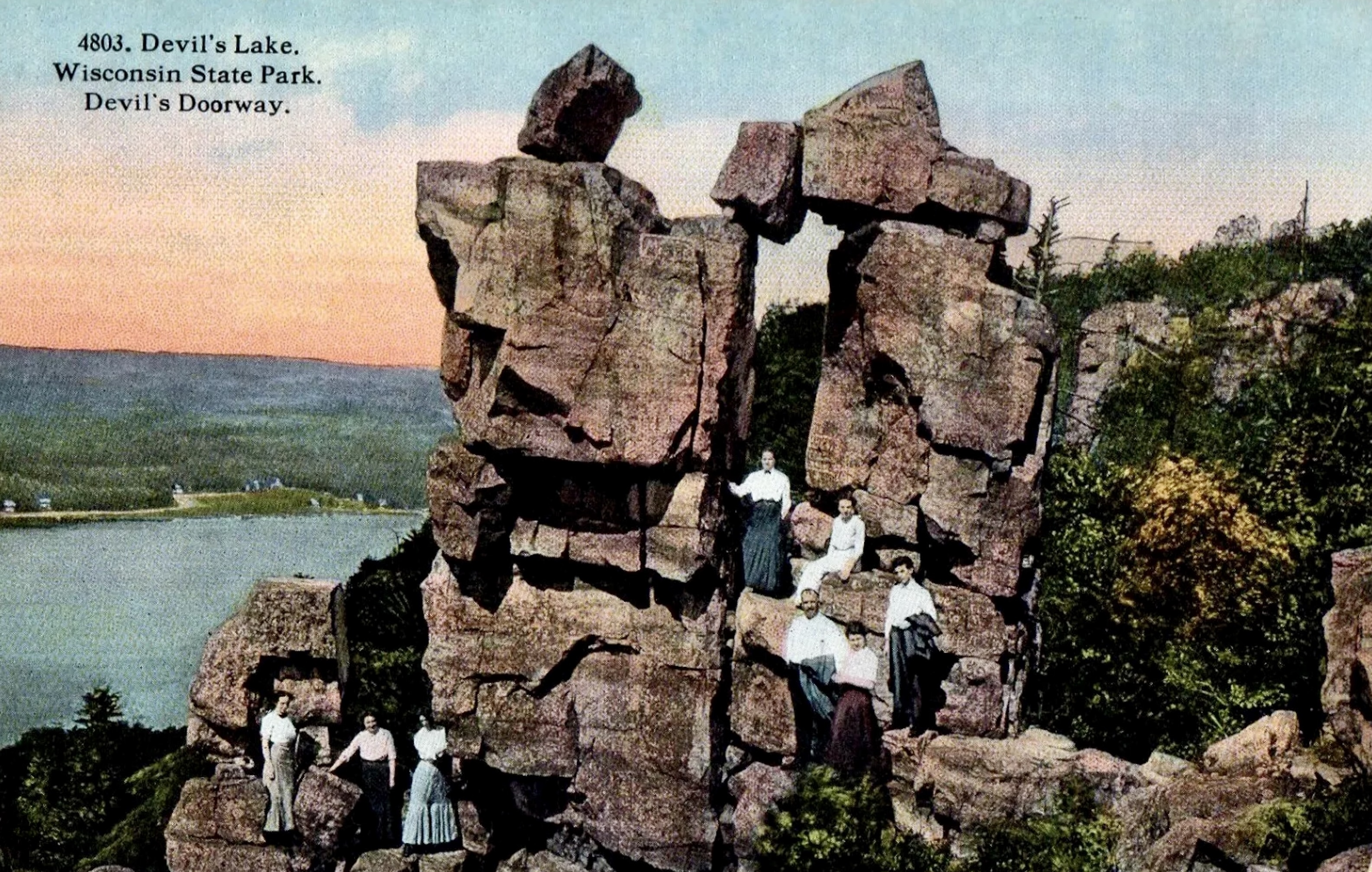
Colorized postcard of Devil's Doorway (1914)

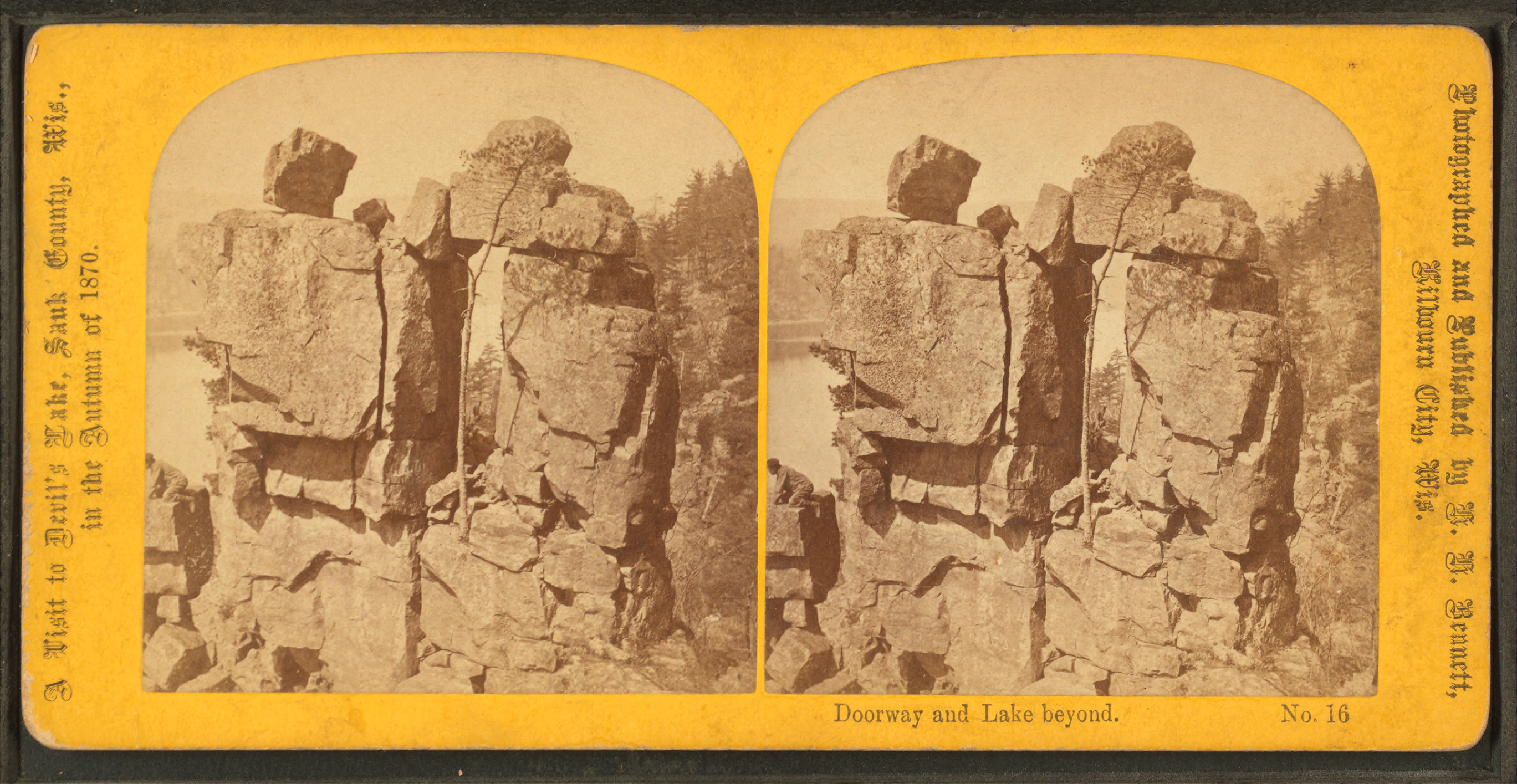
Devil's Doorway (1870)

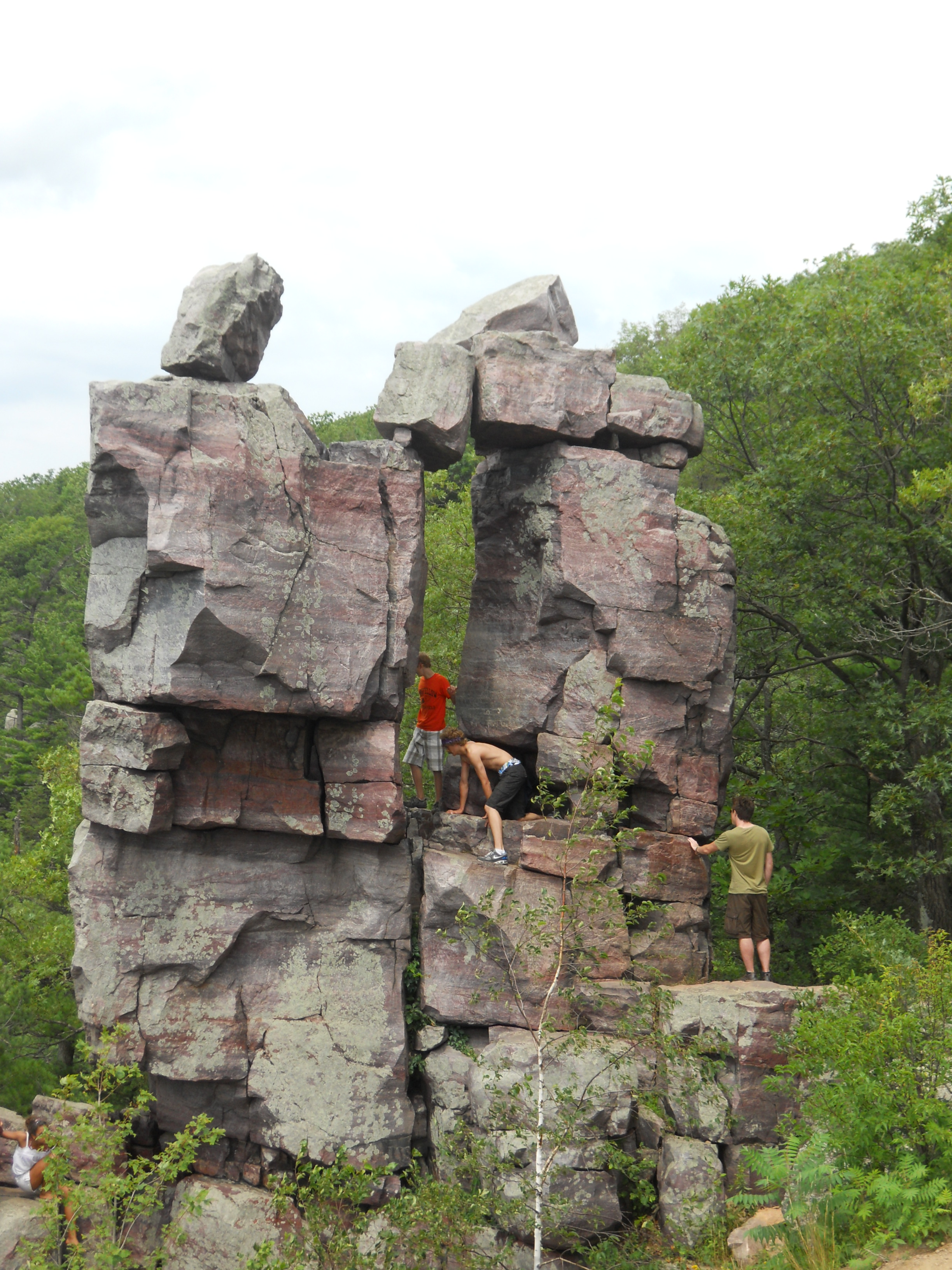
Hikers climbing on Devil's Doorway

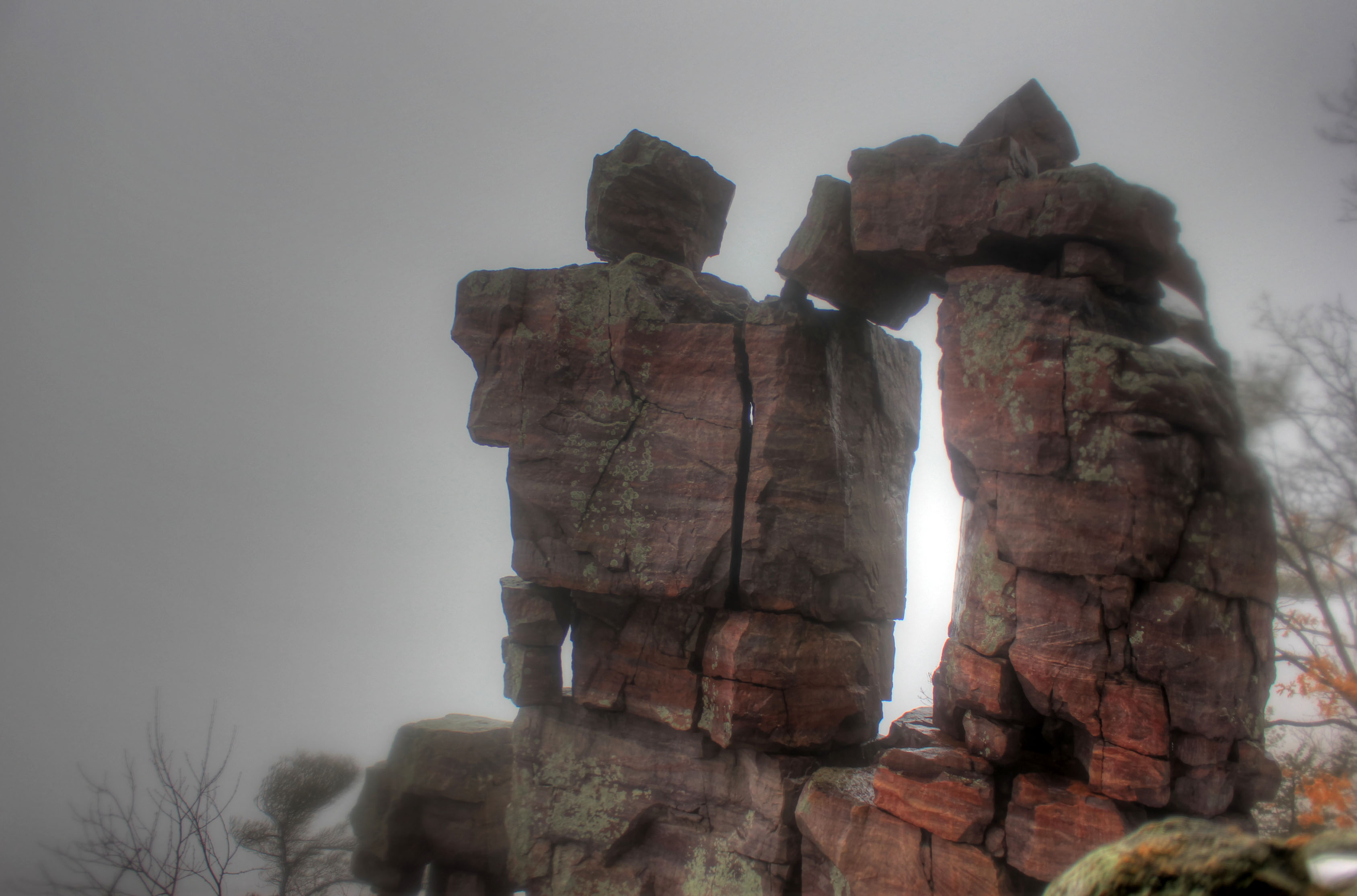
Devils Doorway
