= Devil's Lake (Wisconsin) =

Lake located in Sauk County, Wisconsin

- Tawacunchukdah
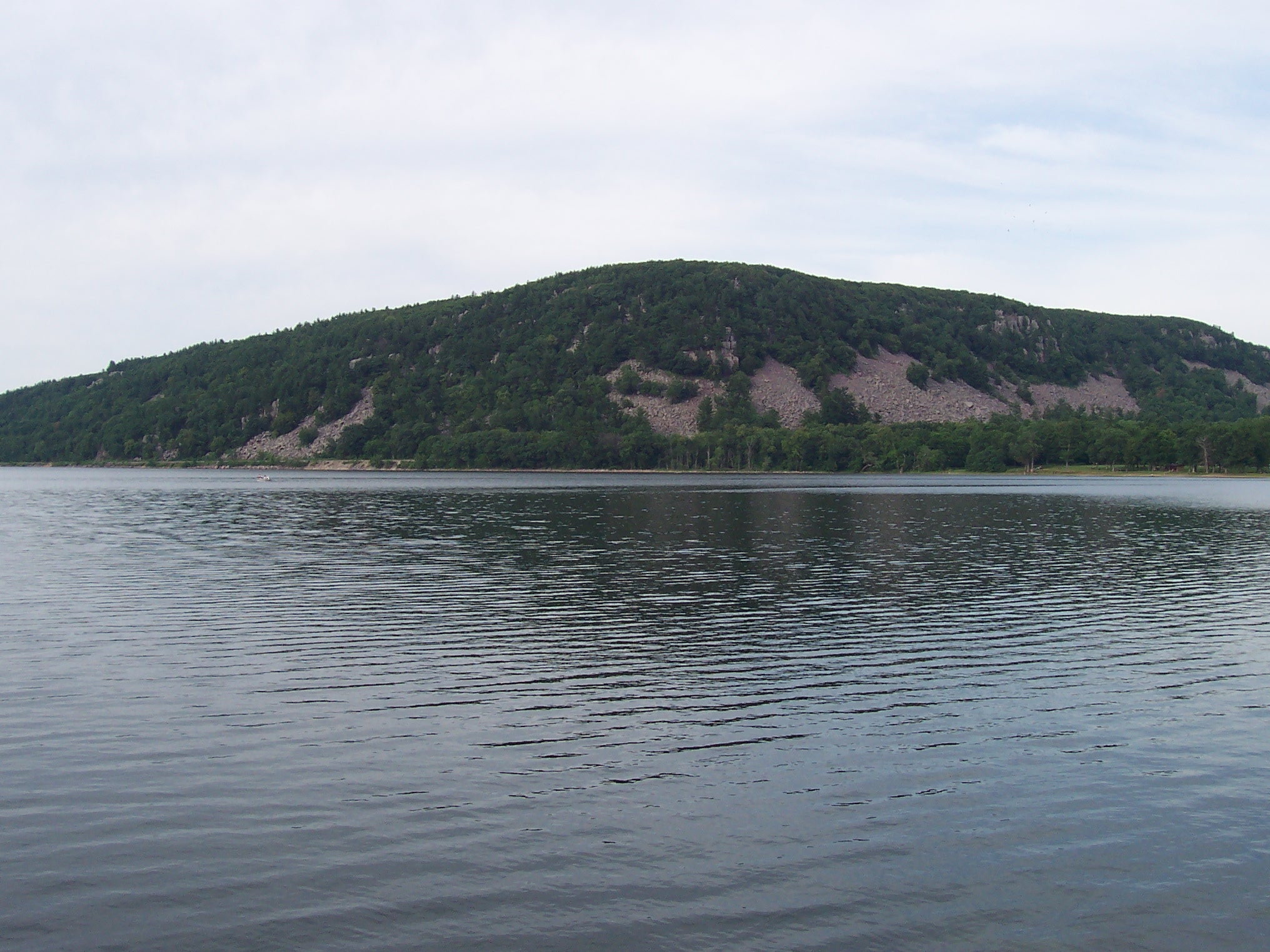

- Location within Wisconsin Location within the United States
- Location: Sauk County, Wisconsin, U.S.
- Coordinates: 43°25′05″N 89°43′55″W
- Type: Endorheic lake
- Basin countries: United States
- Surface area: 374 acres (151 ha)
- Average depth: 30 ft (9.1 m)
- Max. depth: 47 ft (14 m)

Devil's Lake is a lake in Sauk County, Wisconsin, United States. It is part of the South Range of the Baraboo Range, about 2 mi (3.2 km) south of the city of Baraboo, Wisconsin. It has no surface outlets, so by some definitions, it is endorheic; however, it possibly drains by underground channels into the Baraboo River, which would make the lake cryptorheic. The lake is one of the primary attractions of Devil's Lake State Park. It is also a popular recreation destination for watercraft, fishing, hiking, and climbing.

== Name ==
Devil's Lake was so named because it is situated in a deep chasm that was thought to have no visible inlet or outlet. However, the Koshawago Spring, originating from the Koshawago Creek, provides an inlet to the lake on the southwest side. The term Devil's Lake is a misinterpretation of the Ho-Chunk name Te Wakącąk or Te Wakącągara. Day-wa-kahn-chunk-gera, which better translates to "Sacred Lake" or "Spirit Lake." Spirit Lake is highly significant in Ho-Chunk oral history, and voices of spirits were often claimed to be heard during the celebrations.

== History ==
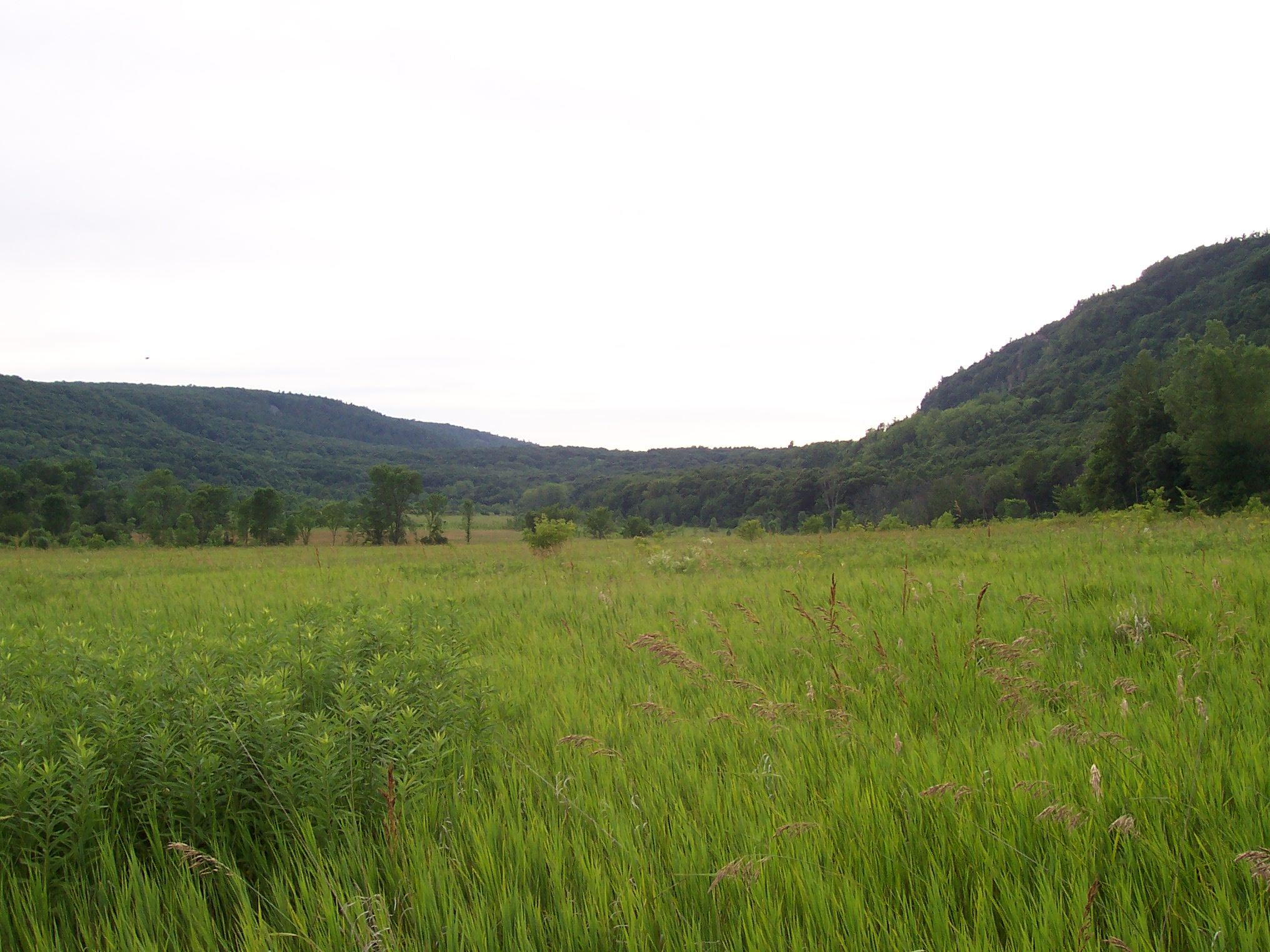
The terminal moraine stretching across the former river gorge in Devil's Lake State Park

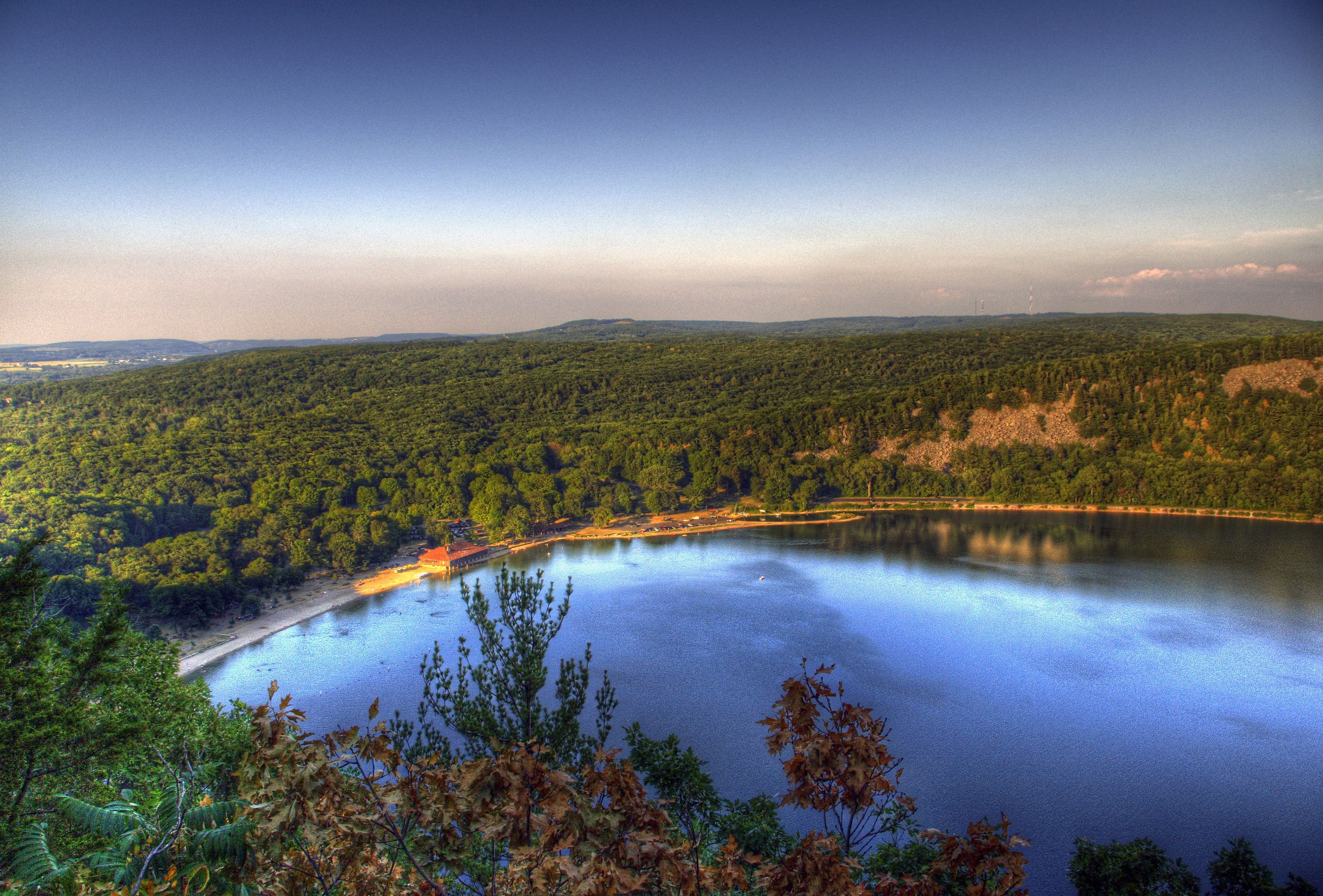
View of the Northern shore of Devil's Lake

The original inhabitants of the area around the lake date back much further than when the European settlers first discovered the land. There is proof that humans occupied the land between 12,000 and 16,000 years ago, but Ho-Chunk speak of people living there more than 300,000 years ago. The area may have been inhabited originally between 12,000 and 16,000 years ago due to the fact that this was the time the last of the glaciers had receded from the area. Many Native tribes throughout Wisconsin inhabited the lands. They called the lake various different names, such as Tewakakak or Minnewaukan, which translate to spirit lake in various Native American Languages.

Devil's Lake was originally a gorge of the Wisconsin River prior to the last ice age. At what is now the southern end of the lake, the river turned from a southerly direction to an easterly direction. During the ice age, a lobe of the glacier passed to the east of the Baraboo Hills and came up the river valley. It deposited materials and then melted, leaving a terminal moraine blocking the river, forming an earthen dam. Another moraine was deposited at the north end of the lake. The river eventually found a new course to the east of the Baraboo Hills, where the glacier had been, leaving a portion of the river gorge between the moraines filled with water. This body of water is Devil's Lake.

== Geology ==
The Devil's Lake State Park is made up of bluffs that are believed to be one of the most ancient surface rock areas in North America. Formed about 1.6 billion years ago, the land consists of Northern and Southern mountain ranges that are made up of quartzite rock. Quartzite was formed after ancient rivers deposited sediment from when this land was under water. Over time, that sediment accumulated into sandstone and underwent immense heat and pressure to form the non-porous metamorphic rock that now encompasses the Baraboo valley. The valley itself consists of softer rock as continental plate activity caused the quartzite rock to form into what's known now as the North and South range.

== Ecology ==
=== Wildlife ===
Devil's Lake is home to a diverse selection of wildlife. Naturally occurring fish include bass and panfish, while walleye, northern pike, and trout are stocked by the Wisconsin DNR. Depending on the season, many types of birds can also be seen on the banks of Devil's Lake. Some of the more commonly seen birds include loons, herons, geese, and ducks. The northern water snake can also be spotted swimming around Devil's Lake. Although the snake is not venomous, it can be aggressive if it feels endangered.

=== Water quality ===
Swimmer's itch (cercarial dermatitis) is a common problem at Devil's Lake, most apparent during the summer months. It is caused by a flatworm parasite hosted by snails. Seventeen species of snails are present in the lake, with three most commonly found snails--Physa skinneri, Gyraulus parvus, and Fossaria obrussa--hosting the parasite.

There have been reports of blue-green algae (cyanobacteria) blooming in Devil's Lake. The park advises visitors to stay alert for algae blooms, which can appear discolored, streaky, or with floating scum or globs on the surface.

=== Water temperature ===
The water temperatures of Devil's Lake varies significantly throughout a calendar year. The highest water temperatures are reported between July and August between 75 and 80 degrees Fahrenheit. The lowest water temperatures for the year are in January, with an average temperature of 35 degrees Fahrenheit. The lake freezes over in the winter, but ice thickness is unmeasured.

== Devils Lake activities ==
=== Boating, fishing, and swimming ===
The lake offers two beaches where guests can swim and relax: the North Shore and South Shore. Each beach provides picnic areas with grills and picnic tables, communal shelters containing bathrooms and concessions, and playgrounds. There are also boat rentals, where visitors can rent pedal boats, paddle boards, and kayaks. During the summer months, kayaking tours of the lake are offered.

Recreational fishing is apparent on the lakeshore and on boat. Two boat launches are offered on the southwest and northeast sides of Devil's Lake. However, to protect water quality, only electric-powered motors are allowed. The clear waters and unique rock formations also attract scuba-divers to the area.

=== Hiking ===
Devils Lake State Park offers 29 miles of hiking trails that vary based on difficulty level, length, and terrain. Among the 17 established trails, the most popular is the Tumbled Rocks Trail. It sits at the edge of the lake on the west end, stretching a mile long. The trail is paved, allowing it to be accessible for people with disabilities or visitors that wish to use a wheelchair, as well as ranked as "easy". Many visitors report to using this trail in order to find a spot to fish from or a rock jump off of. The parks most popular diving rock, Rock 8, can be accessed via the Tumbled Rocks trail. A second trail to highlight is the East Bluff Trail, with multiple overlooks and views, rock formations, and an abundance of wildlife. Rock formations pop up regularly throughout the trail, yet there are special appearances of the "Elephant Rock" and "Elephant Cave" along the way, two famous landmarks of the park. The trail continues for 1.7 miles, gaining over 500 feet of elevation and is expected to take hikers anywhere between 1.5 and 3 hours to complete.

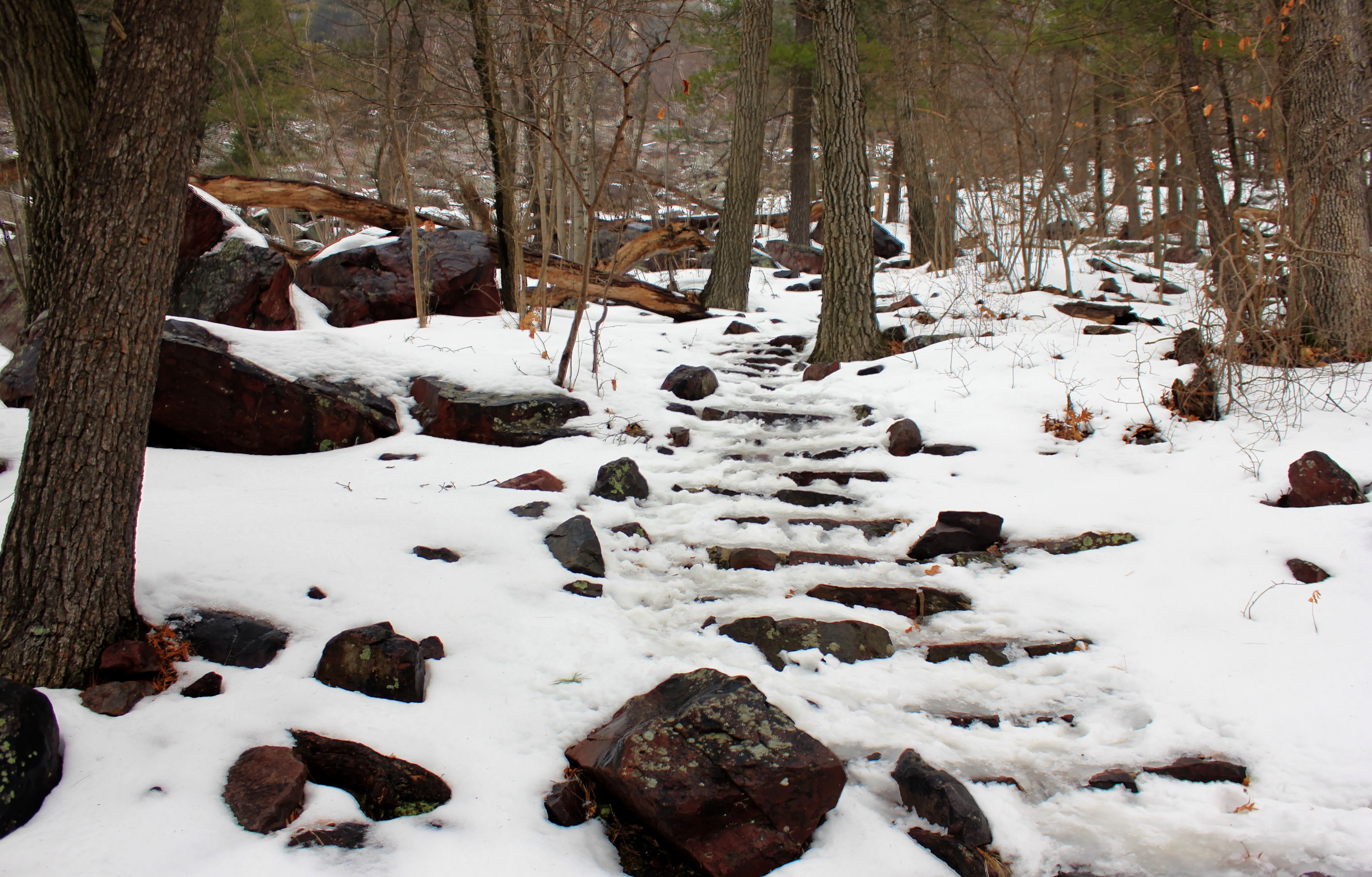
Snow covered stone steps on the way up Devil's Head

=== Winter activities ===
Although the trails are not maintained during the winter, they remain open, supporting numerous activities.

Cross country skiing is popular at Devils Lake State Park. There is one loop trail used for skiing that continues along Steinke Basin Loop. The trail is not tracked and conditions are not guaranteed to be great, yet visitors report that the overall experience is worth it.

The "multi use" Steinke Basin Loop trail is also quite frequently used for snowshoeing. Devils Lake State Park allows visitors to roam free without restriction.

== See also ==
- Devil's Lake State Park Official Website
- Ice Age Trail
