= Seafood pizza =

Variety of pizza with seafood toppings

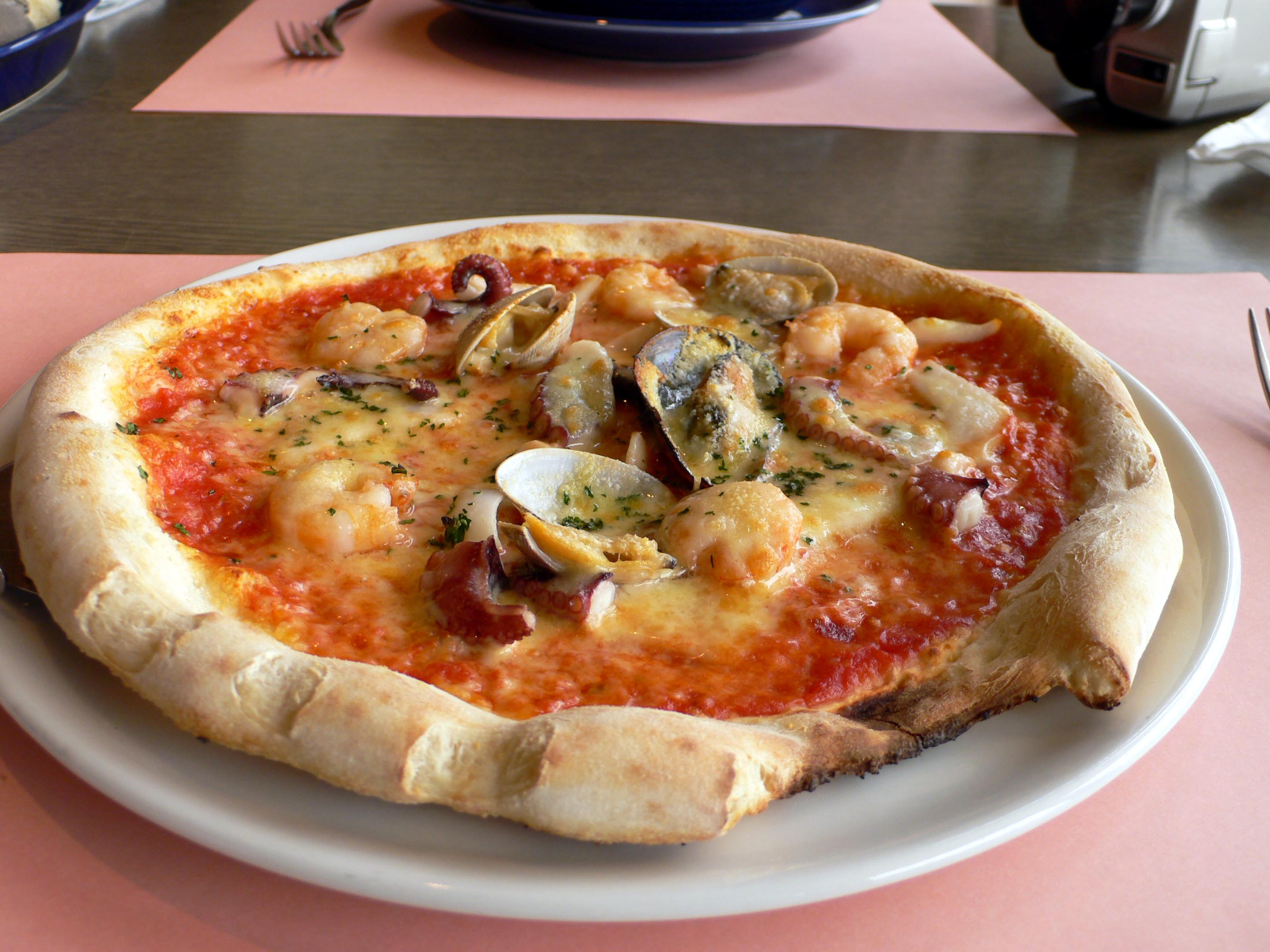
- A seafood pizza with clams, shrimp, and octopus
- Type: Pizza
- Place of origin: Italy
- Main ingredients: Seafood

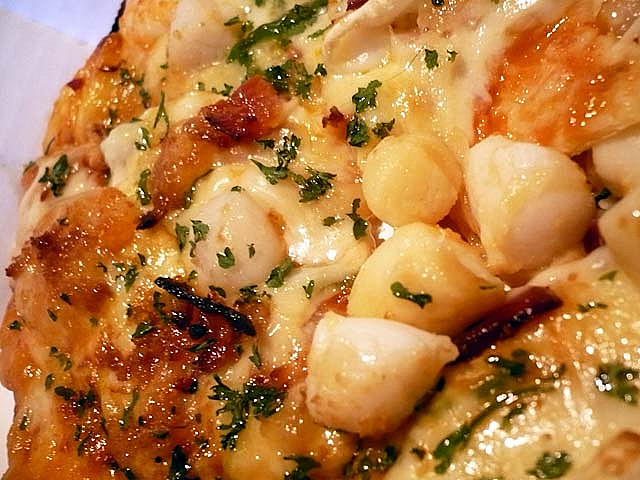
A close-up view of a seafood pizza prepared with scallops, shrimp, calamari, and many other ingredients

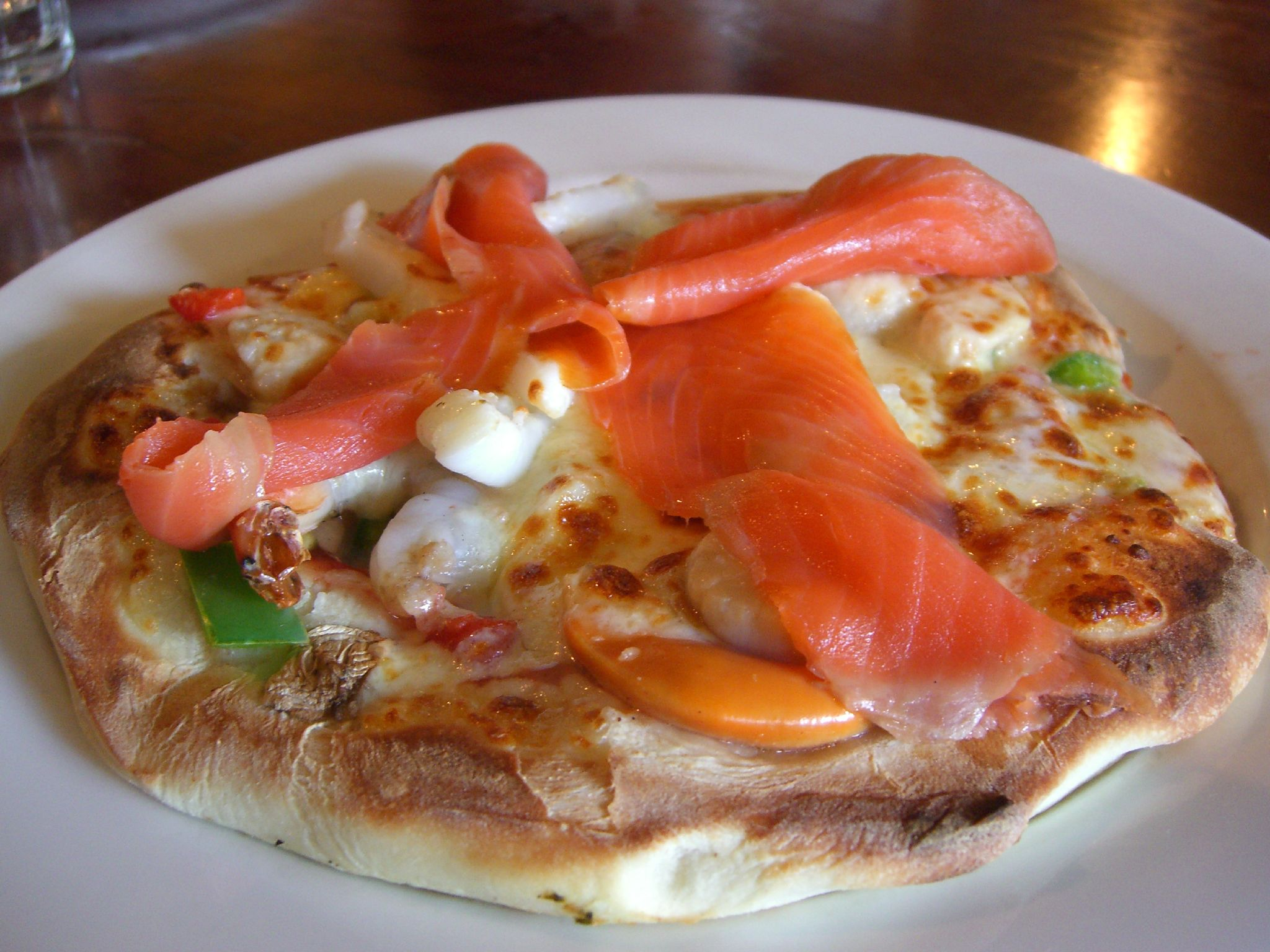
A seafood pizza prepared with salmon

Seafood pizza is a pizza prepared with seafood as a primary topping. Many types of seafood ingredients in fresh, frozen or canned forms may be used on seafood pizza. Some retail pizza chains, as well as smaller restaurants, offer seafood pizzas to consumers.

== Ingredients ==
Various seafood can be used to prepare the dish, such as fish (including salmon, tuna, anchovy), shellfish, clams, scallops, mussels, shrimp, squid, and sea snail, among others. Imitation seafood may also be used. Fresh or frozen seafood may be used, and some versions use canned seafood, such as canned tuna.

== Varieties ==
=== Pizza ai frutti di mare ===
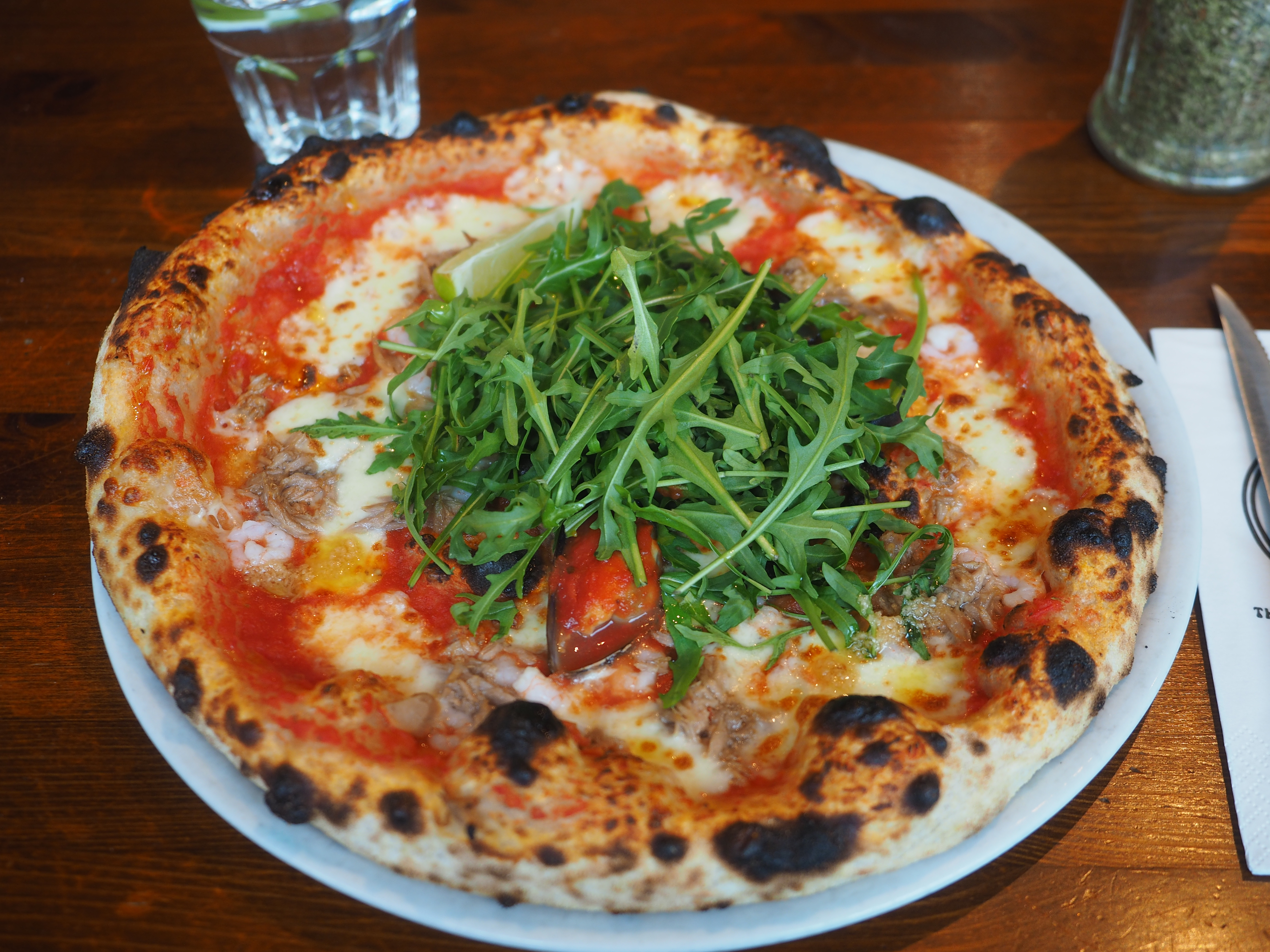
Pizza ai frutti di mare with mussels and shrimps

Pizza ai frutti di mare is an Italian type of pizza that may be served with scampi, mussels or squid. It typically lacks cheese, with the seafood being served atop a tomato sauce.

=== Tuna and onion pizza ===
A popular Italian variety is the tuna and onion pizza (pizza con tonno e cipolle), topped with tomato, mozzarella, canned tuna, red onion slices, and olive oil. This is also one of the most popular varieties of pizza in Brazil.

=== Pizza pescatore ===
A variety of seafood pizza is pizza pescatore ('fisherman's pizza'), which is prepared with mussels and squid.

=== Commercial varieties ===
==== Chain restaurants ====
Domino's offers a seafood pizza in Vietnam, which (as of December 2012) was the company's "best-selling product in Vietnam", and a tuna, sweetcorn, and red onion pizza in the UK.

Pizza Hut has offered a seafood pizza in Malaysia and India called "Seafood symphony". The Indian Pizza Hut version was prepared with fresh seafood from the waters of Kochi, India.

==== Smaller companies ====
Frank Pepe Pizzeria Napoletana in New Haven, Connecticut, is well known for its white clam pizza, featuring fresh littleneck clams.

==== World's most expensive pizza ====
The world's most expensive pizza listed by Guinness World Records is a 12-inch (30 cm) seafood pizza called "C6", prepared at Steveston Pizza Co. restaurant in Steveston, British Columbia, which costs C$450. The pizza includes lobster, caviar, tiger prawns, and smoked salmon. The title for world's most expensive pizza was previously held by a C$178 pizza prepared with white truffle by Gordon Ramsay. As of September 2014, Guinness World Records still lists the Gordon Ramsay pizza on their website.

There are several instances of more expensive pizzas, such as the US$4,200 "Pizza Royale 007" at Haggis restaurant in Glasgow, Scotland, which has caviar, lobster and is topped with 24-carat gold leaf, and the US$1,000 caviar pizza made by Nino's Bellissima pizzeria in New York City, New York.

== See also ==
- List of seafood dishes
- List of pizza varieties by country
