= Pizza Rossini =

Specialty of Pesaro

- The most traditional form of pizza Rossini
- Type: Pizza
- Place of origin: Italy
- Region or state: Pesaro, Marche
- Main ingredients: Flour, mozzarella, eggs, mayonnaise, tomato purée (homemade), water

Pizza Rossini is a specialty pizza originating in the Marche city of Pesaro, Italy. Created in the 1960s in a local pastry shop, this pizza was initially designed to accompany an apéritif and quickly became popular among Pesaro's inhabitants. The name "Rossini" pays tribute to the composer Gioachino Rossini, who was born in the city. Traditionally, pizza Rossini consists of a base of tomato purée and mozzarella, followed by the addition of toppings such as boiled eggs and mayonnaise.

== History ==
Pizza Rossini was born in Pesaro at the turn of the 1960s. Designed to accompany the apéritif, met with success among the inhabitants of Pesaro, to the point of motivating the city's pizza chefs to offer this novelty in their pizzerias; the name of the pizza is a tribute to the composer Gioachino Rossini, who was born in Pesaro.

== Composition ==
A pizza of this type is initially topped with tomato purée and mozzarella; after cooking in the oven, boiled eggs cut into slices are added with mayonnaise on top.

== See also ==
- List of pizza varieties by country
