= Pizza capricciosa =

Italian pizza dish

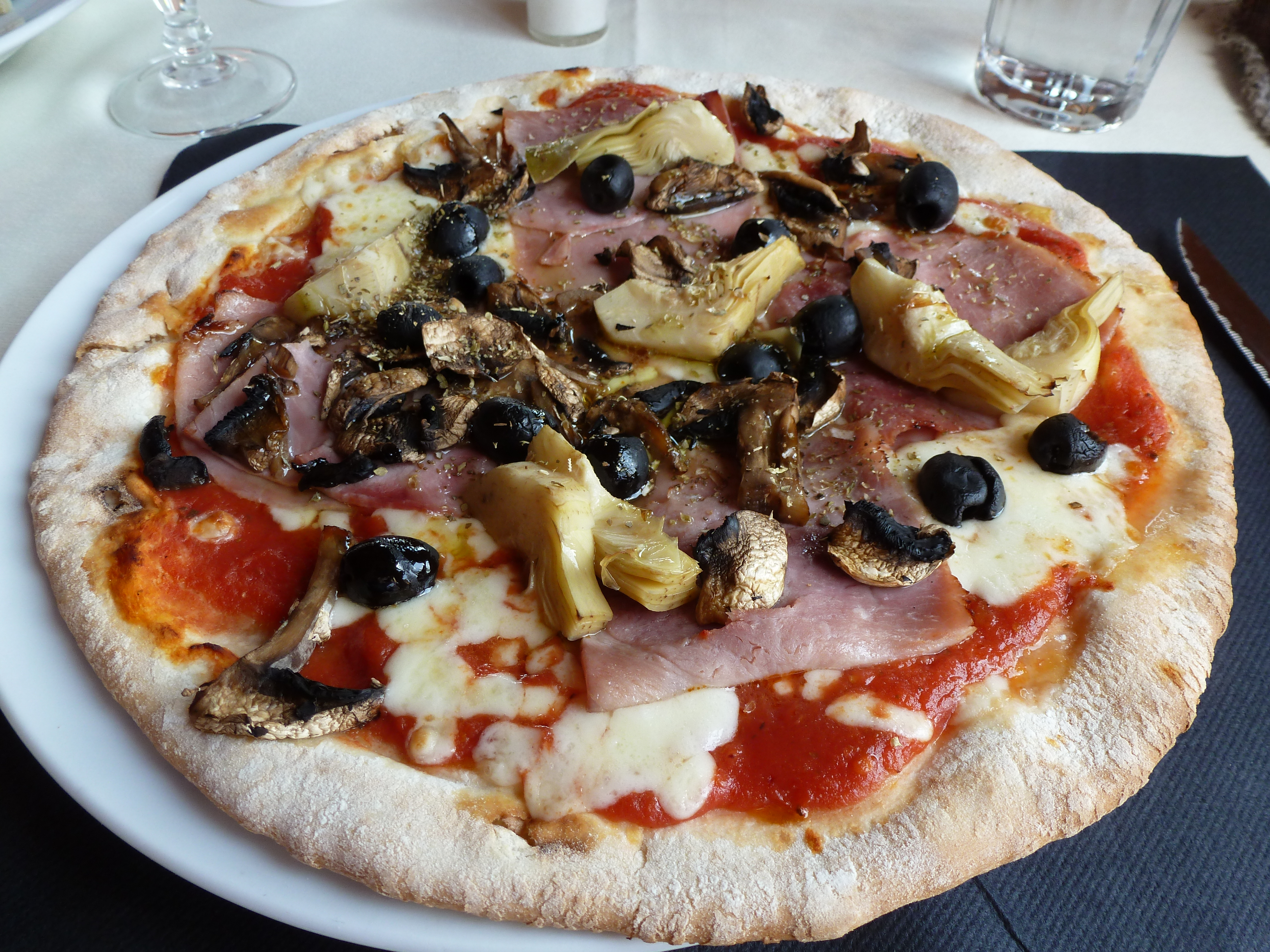
- Type: Pizza
- Place of origin: Italy
- Main ingredients: Mozzarella, prosciutto, mushrooms (usually champignons), green and black olives, artichokes, tomatoes
- Variations: Anchovies

Pizza capricciosa (Italian: [ˈpittsa kapritˈtʃoːza, -oːsa]) is a style of pizza in Italian cuisine prepared with mozzarella cheese, prosciutto, mushrooms (usually champignons), green and black olives, artichokes, and tomatoes. A variant includes anchovies. Pizza capricciosa was invented in the restaurant La Capricciosa in Rome in 1937, from which it gets its name. (Note: Note that while capricciosa means lit. 'capricious or whimsical' in Italian, the pizza was named after the restaurant La Capricciosa in Rome rather than being directly named capricious or whimsical itself.)

Although pizza capricciosa has similar ingredients to pizza quattro stagioni, they are arranged in a different order.

== See also ==
Media related to Pizza capricciosa at Wikimedia Commons

- List of pizza varieties by country

== Bibliography ==
- Pedrotti, Walter (2000). Pizze, focacce, torte salate (in Italian). Giunti Editore. pp. 19–20. ISBN 8844016311.
