= List of pizza varieties by country =

Pizza is a staple of Italian cuisine. It has become one of the most recognizable and popular dishes worldwide. Its widespread adoption into other cuisines, replacing the local traditional dishes, is traced to the early 20th century.

== Europe ==
=== Italy ===
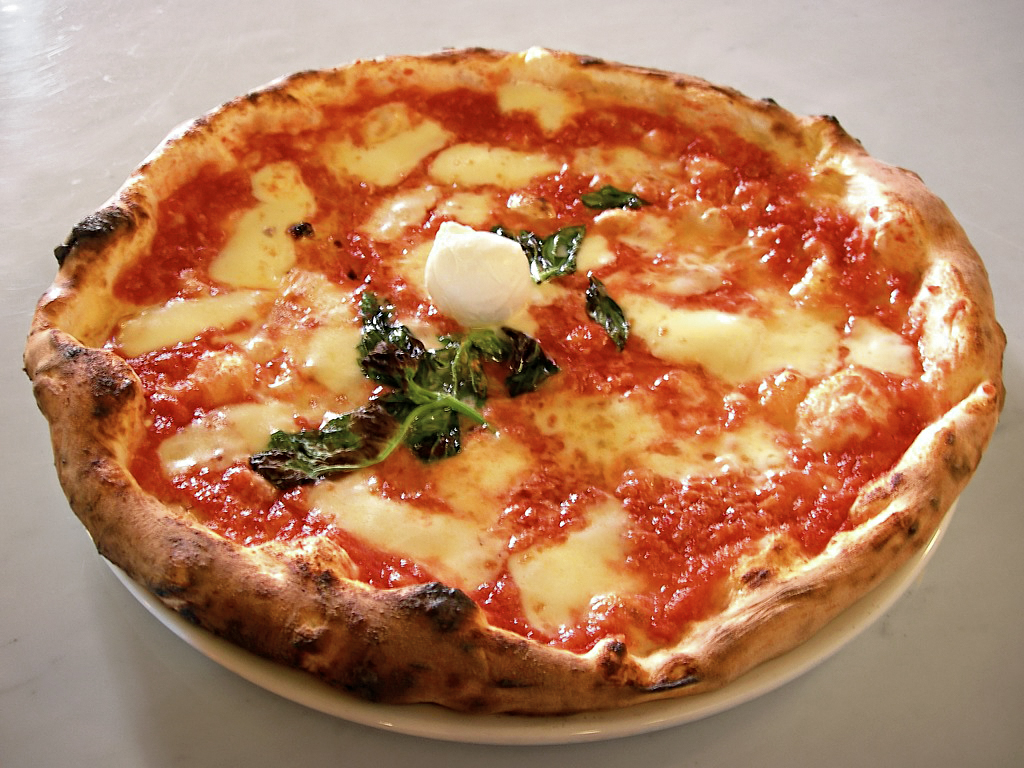
Pizza Margherita

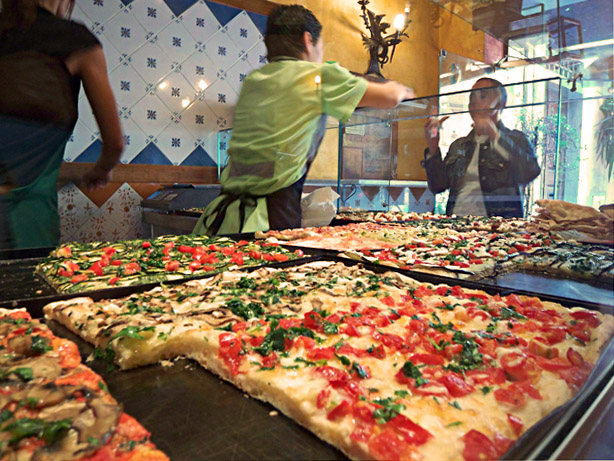
Pizza al taglio in Rome, Italy

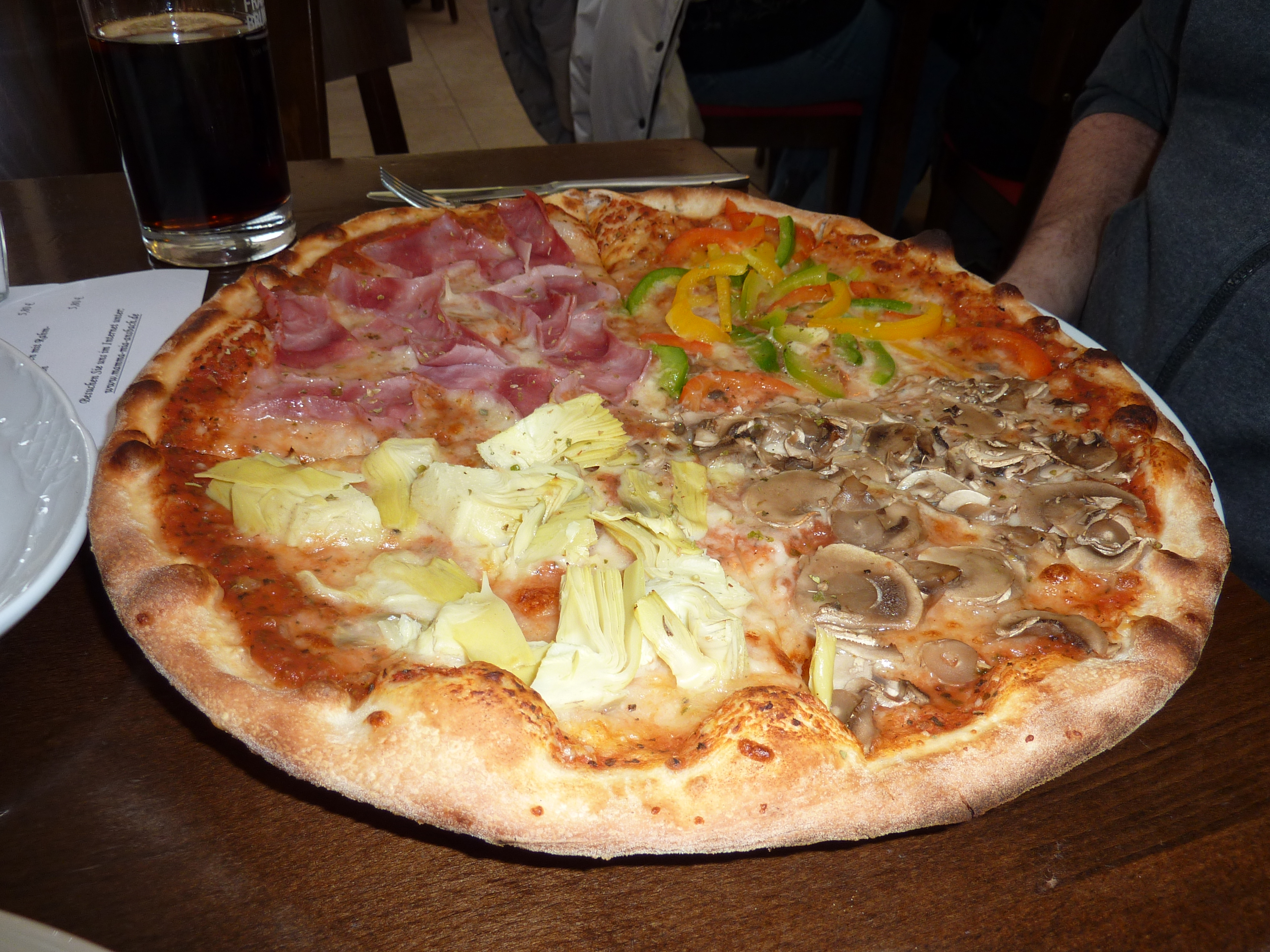
Pizza quattro stagioni

Authentic pizze napoletane ('Neapolitan pizzas') are typically made with tomatoes and mozzarella cheese. They can be made with ingredients such as San Marzano tomatoes, which grow on the volcanic plains to the south of Mount Vesuvius, and fiordilatte mozzarella made with cow's milk.

According to the rules proposed by the Associazione Verace Pizza Napoletana, the genuine Neapolitan pizza dough consists of wheat flour (type 0 or 00, or a mixture of both), natural Neapolitan yeast or brewer's yeast, salt and water. For proper results, strong flour with high protein content (as used for bread-making rather than cakes) must be used. The dough must be kneaded by hand or with a low-speed mixer. After the rising process, the dough must be formed by hand without the help of a rolling pin or other machine, and may be no more than 3 mm (0.12 in) thick. The pizza must be baked for 60–90 seconds in a 485 °C (905 °F) stone oven with an oak-wood fire. When cooked, it should be crispy, tender and fragrant. There are three official variants:

- pizza marinara, which is made with tomato, garlic, oregano and extra-virgin olive oil,
- pizza Margherita, made with tomato, sliced mozzarella, basil and extra-virgin olive oil, and
- pizza Margherita di bufala made with tomato, sliced buffalo mozzarella from Campania, basil and extra-virgin olive oil.

Pizza napoletana is a traditional speciality guaranteed (TSG) product in Europe.

Roman pizza, as well as pizza in many other parts of Italy, is available in two different styles. Take-away shops sell pizza rustica or pizza al taglio. This pizza is cooked in long, rectangular baking pans and relatively thick (1–2 cm (0.4–0.8 in)). The pizza is often cooked in an electric oven. It is usually cut with scissors or a knife and sold by weight. In pizzerias, pizza is served in a dish in its traditional round shape. It has a thin, crisp base quite different from the thicker and softer Neapolitan-style base. It is usually cooked in a wood-fired oven, giving the pizza its unique flavor and texture. In Rome, a pizza napoletana is topped with tomato, mozzarella, anchovies, oregano, capers and oil (thus, what in Naples is called pizza romana, in Rome is called pizza napoletana). Other types of Lazio-style pizza include:

- Pizza capricciosa
- Pizza quattro formaggi
- Pizza quattro stagioni
- Pizza Rossini
- Pizzetta
- Sicilian pizza

==== Legislation for traditional Italian pizza ====
There was a bill before the Italian Parliament in 2002 to safeguard the traditional Italian pizza, specifying permissible ingredients and methods of processing (e.g., excluding frozen pizzas). Only pizzas which followed these guidelines could be called "traditional Italian pizzas" in Italy. On 9 December 2009, the European Union, upon Italian request, granted traditional speciality guaranteed safeguard to traditional Neapolitan pizza, in particular to "Margherita" and "Marinara". The European Union enacted a protected designation of origin system in the 1990s.

=== Finland ===
Poro, formerly known as the Berlusconi pizza, is Kotipizza's product name for a pizza with smoked reindeer meat, tomato sauce, cheese, chanterelle mushrooms and red onion.

With Pizza Berlusconi, Kotipizza won the America's Plate International pizza contest in New York City in March 2008, beating the Italian-Americans, who came in second place, and the Australians in third.

=== Hungary ===
Hungarians enjoy most of the traditional pizza toppings, but there are some unique local varieties, including "Magyaros" ("Hungarian-style") pizza, which usually has toppings such as bacon, kolbász (Hungarian sausage), salami, hot peppers, and red onion. "White pizza" (see below) is also popular, especially because it is similar to Hungarian kenyérlángos or langalló (a type of flatbread often topped with sour cream, bacon and onions).

=== Iceland ===
While Iceland has many traditional American and Italian style pizza toppings, bananas are a common topping in the country.

=== Norway ===
Norwegians eat the most pizza in the world according to a 2004 survey by ACNielsen 2004, 5.4 kg/year per capita. 50 million frozen pizzas were sold that year, with consumption being 22,000 tons of frozen pizza, 15,000 tons of home-baked and 13,000 tons of restaurant-made pizzas.

=== Poland ===
According to thefirstnews.com, "...most ordered pizza in Poland is the capricciosa, while the favourite toppings in Poland are ham, salami, mushrooms, onions and bacon. Garlic dipping sauce is the favourite choice to accompany a pizza is with 68 percent choosing this and tomato sauce in second place with 14 percent."

=== Slovenia ===
Pizza was introduced to Slovenia in the 1970s. The country's first pizzeria, Pizzeria Parma in Ljubljana, opened in 1974. It became known for a distinctive thick-crust style of pizza with generous toppings, baked in a signature conveyor-belt oven. One of its best-known varieties is topped with ham, mushrooms, cheese, and an egg.

=== Sweden ===
The first pizza to be served in Sweden was in 1947 at the ASEA staff canteen in Västerås but it was not until 1968 that it became available to the general public at the Stockholm restaurant Östergök.

One Swedish speciality is the calskrove, a calzone-type pizza containing hamburgers and fries. This type of pizza became popular in Sweden in 2007. Some pizzas in Sweden can have unconventional toppings such as pineapple or banana (usually in combination with curry sauce). In 2019 a special type of pizza in Skottorp achieved international fame when its toppings included kiwifruit.

== Asia ==
=== South and East Asia ===
==== China ====
The presence of pizza restaurant chains in China has contributed to a significant increase in pizza consumption in the country. Pizza Hut opened its first store in China in 1990, and Pizza Hut and Domino's Pizza both expanded in the Chinese market in the 2000s. To fit with China's market demand and national culinary peculiarities Pizza Hut modified its pizza recipes to include local ingredients, such as crab sticks, tuna, soy sauce and corn. As of 2019, Pizza Hut had over 2,000 outlets in China.

==== India ====
Pizza is an emerging fast food in India. Domestic pizza brands include U.S. Pizza, Smokin' Joes and Pizza Corner. Branded pizza is available in most cities in India. India is the largest market for Domino's Pizza outside the US. Pizza brands feature greater "recipe localization" from pizza makers than many other markets such as Latin America and Europe, but similar to other Asian pizza markets. Indian pizzas are generally spicier and more vegetable-oriented than those in other countries. For instance, oregano spice packs are included with a typical pizza order in India instead of Parmesan cheese. In addition to spicier and more vegetable-oriented ingredients, Indian pizza also utilizes unique toppings such as pickled ginger.

==== Indonesia ====
In Indonesia, Pizza Hut is the largest pizza chain restaurant, first entering Indonesia in 1984, followed by Domino's and Papa Ron's Pizza.

However, there are also Asian Eastern pizzas which includes Indonesian fusion pizza that combine Indonesian favourite as pizza toppings – such as satay, balado and rendang.

- Balado pizza, spicy hot balado chili pepper pizza, chicken or beef.
- Rendang pizza, spicy and savoury beef rendang pizza.
- Satay pizza, beef or chicken satay pizza with peanut sauce.

==== Japan ====
American pizza chains entered Japan in the 1970s (e.g. Shakey's Pizza and Pizza Hut in 1973, Domino's in 1985). The largest Japanese pizza chain is Pizza-La. Local types of pizza are popular, with many using mayonnaise sauce, and sometimes other ingredients such as corn, potatoes, avocado, eel, or even honey or chocolate pizza (as a dessert). "Side orders" also often include items such as French fries, fried chicken, and baked pasta, as well as vegetable soups and green salads.

One of the unique pizza toppings found in Japan is squid. While seafood may be found on pizzas in most markets worldwide to some extent, having squid as the focal ingredient is unique to Japan.

Local crust variants also exist, for instance mochi pizza (crust made with Japanese mochi cakes).

==== Korea ====
Pizza is a popular food in South Korea, especially among younger people.

North Korea's first pizzeria opened in its capital Pyongyang in 2009.

==== Philippines ====
Pizza first arrived in the Philippines during the American period (1901–1946). Many pizza restaurant chains that set up shop in the Philippines (e.g. Pizza Hut, Domino's, and Shakey's Pizza) are American in origin. The typical Filipino-style pizza is similar to Hawaiian pizza due to their usage of pineapple toppings, although sometimes instead of pepperoni, ham or hotdog chunks are used. There are also variants using traditional Filipino dishes such as sardines, dried tinapa, bagnet, and longganisa as toppings.

==== Thailand ====
The Pizza Company Thailand introduced durian pizza in 2018 to mixed reviews. Thailand also has many independent pizza restaurants, particularly in Bangkok and tourists areas. Pizza can range from chains serving American-style pizza with western or Thai toppings, to quite authentic Neapolitan and Roman style pizza in Bangkok.

==== Iran ====
Iranian pizza, also known as Persian pizza, is a style of pizza characterized by its generous quantities of cheese and toppings. It is commonly prepared with ingredients such as minced meat, beef sausages, bell peppers, mushrooms and onions, seasoned with various herbs and spices. Iranian pizza is often made with a thick crust, and ketchup is commonly used as a condiment, sometimes instead of tomato sauce.

== North America ==
=== Canada ===
There are several regional pizza varieties, with Windsor-style pizza from Windsor, Ontario being the most recognizable.

=== Mexico ===
Pizza in Mexico is made with ingredients typical of Mexican cuisine. The usual toppings that can be found throughout Mexico are chorizo, jalapeño chili peppers, grilled or fried onions, tomato, chili pepper, shrimp, avocado, and sometimes beef, bell peppers, tripas, canned tuna or scallops. This pizza has the usual marinara sauce or white sauce and mozzarella cheese. Variations, substituting Pepper Jack cheese or Oaxaca cheese for mozzarella, are also popular.

=== United States ===
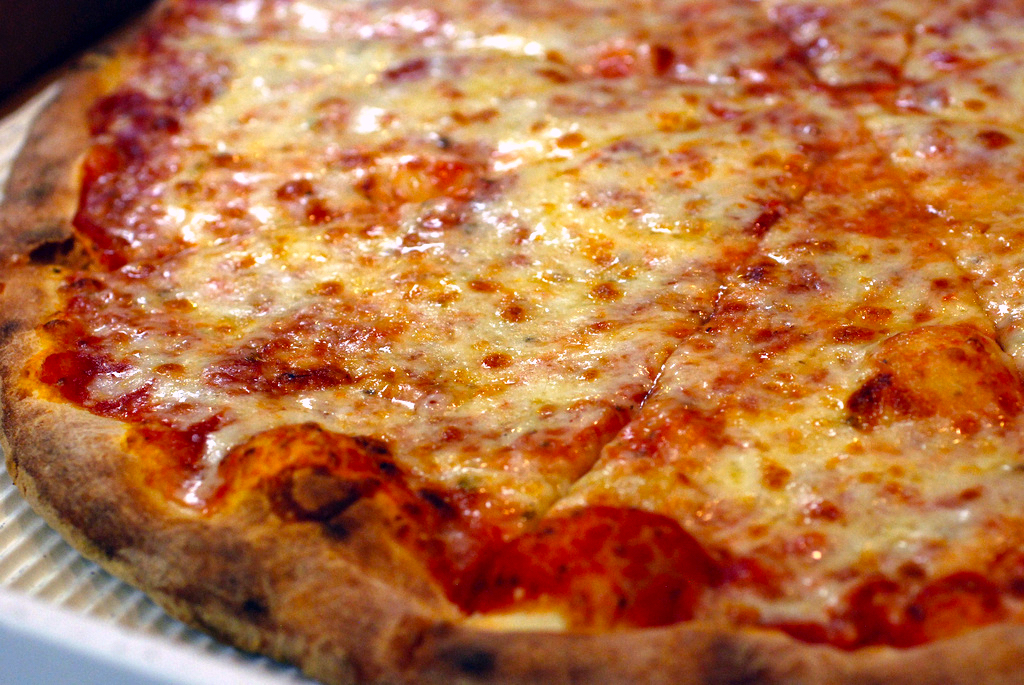
New York–style pizza

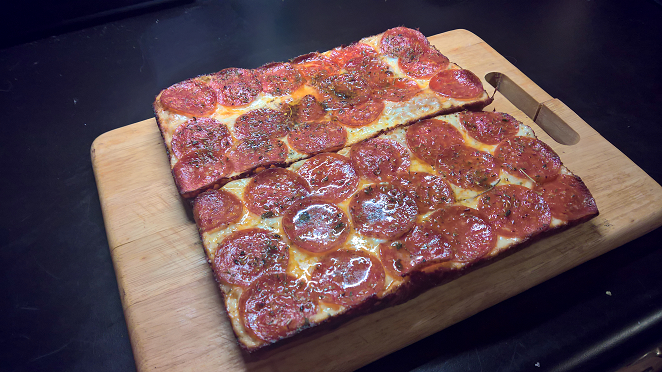
Detroit-style pizza

In 1905, the first pizza establishment in the United States was opened in New York City's Little Italy. Due to the influx of Italian immigrants, the U.S. has developed regional forms of pizza, some bearing only a casual resemblance to the Italian original. However, virtually every suburb and city in the United States does have reasonably authentic Neapolitan-style pizza restaurants.

The most renowned pizza variety is New York-style pizza, but other regional varieties include Detroit-style, Chicago deep dish, St Louis-style, California-style, Quad City-style, New England “Greek Style”, New Haven-style, Colorado mountain pie, Minneapolis-style, Columbus-style, Ohio Valley-style, Trenton tomato pie, Briar Hill-style, Altoona-style, Dayton-style, and Beach Pizza.

The jumbo slice is an oversized New York–style pizza sold by the slice to go, especially in the Adams Morgan neighborhood in Washington, D.C. The white clam pie is a pizza variety that originated at the Frank Pepe Pizzeria Napoletana restaurant in New Haven, Connecticut. Barbecue pizza was first made at Coletta's in Memphis, Tennessee, using pulled pork and barbecue sauce, now popular in the Southern United States. In California, the barbecue chicken pizza is popular, first invented by Ed LaDou in 1985.

== Oceania ==
=== Australia ===
Australian variety of pizza named The Aussie (also called Aussie Bob, Aussie Legend, Aussie Bite) features egg as a unique pizza topping, often paired with ham and bacon, and is attributed to Salvatore Della Bruna of Toto's Pizza House. It has been served in restaurants around Australia, including Domino's in 1996 and 2009.

=== New Zealand ===
The usual Italian varieties are available and independent restaurants are common, coexisting with franchise chains. New Zealand's first dedicated pizza franchise was opened by Pizza Hut in New Lynn in 1974, with Eagle Boys and Pizza Haven following in the mid-1990s and Domino's in 2003. One notable indigenous chain is Hell Pizza established in 1996 – which now has outlets worldwide – distinguishing itself by often-controversial marketing and using only free-range ingredients. Furthermore, Middle-Eastern bakeries and kebabs shops often sell pizza, which is often done in Turkish style.

In 2017, spaghetti pizza gained media attention when then Prime Minister of New Zealand Bill English posted a recipe to his Facebook account that included tinned spaghetti. The recipe included pineapple as a topping. Mixed responses on social media included support for spaghetti pizza as a simple and cheap family meal. In 2019, Domino's included a "Hawaiian Spaghetti Pizza" on the menu on its franchises in New Zealand.

== South America ==
=== Brazil ===
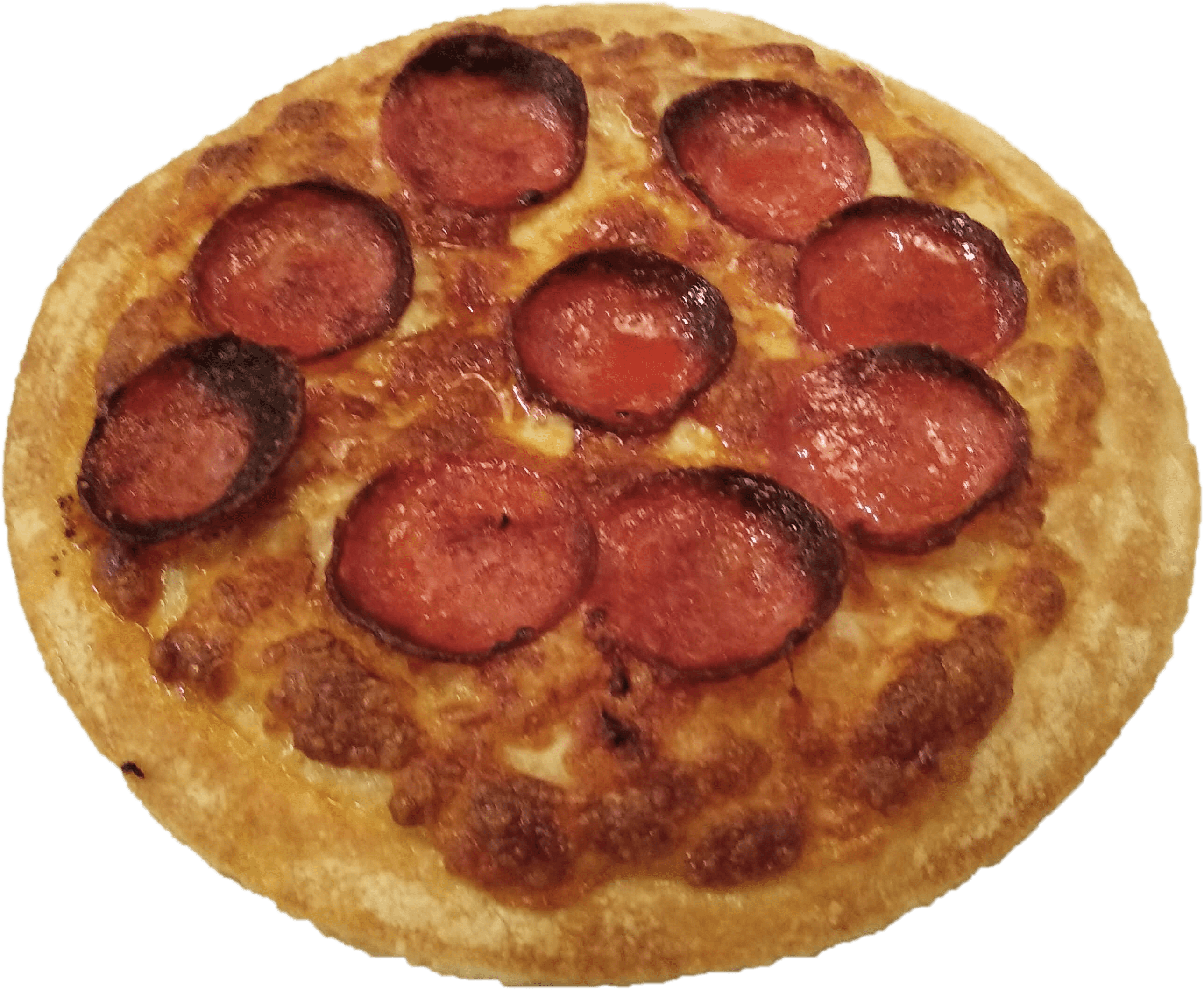
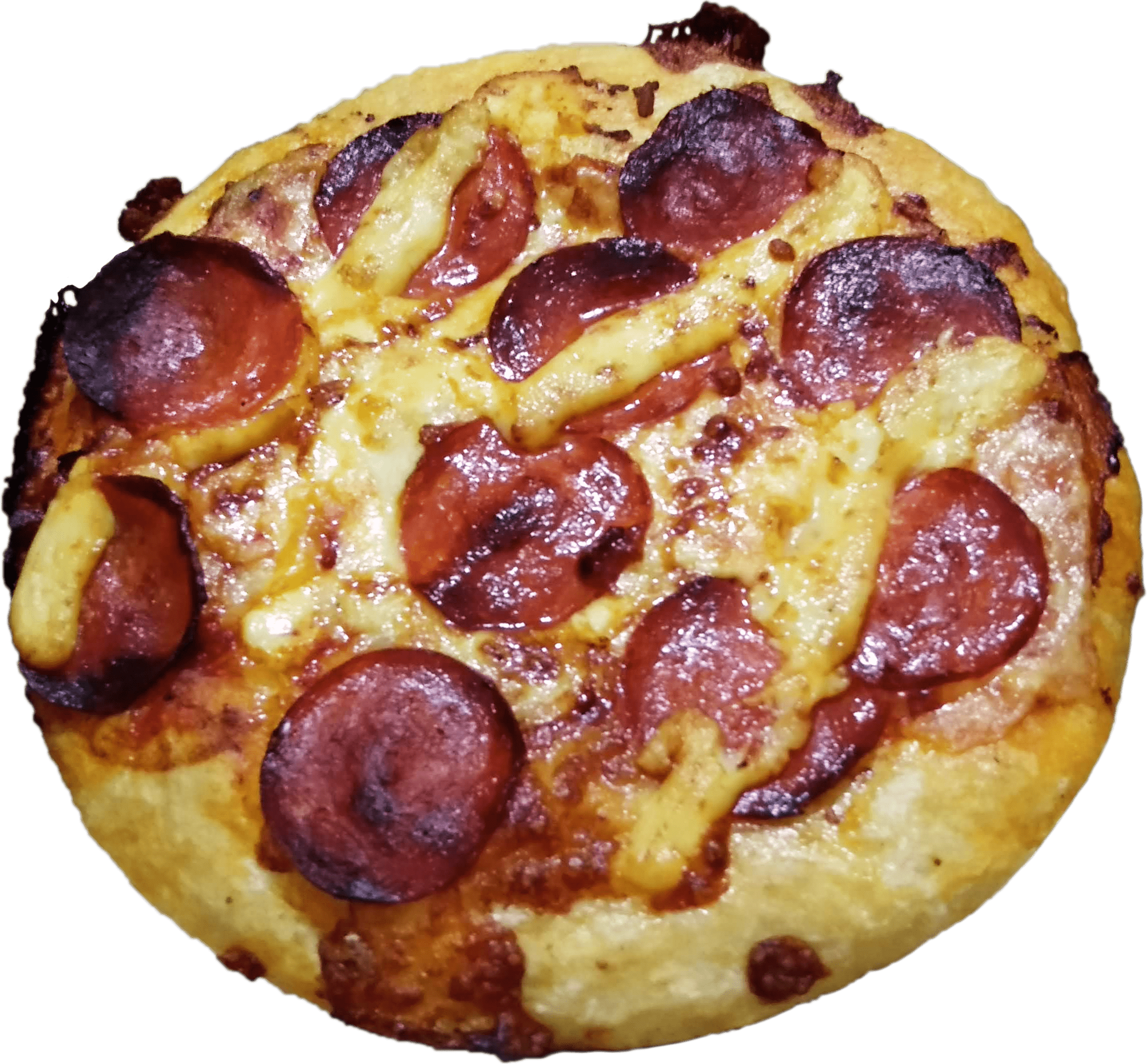
Two Brazilian pepperoni pan pizzas. The bottom pizza has requeijão streaks on top, and might therefore be referred to as a catuperoni pizza.

In 2007, São Paulo was the second largest consumer of pizza in the world, behind only New York City, with 1.4 million pizzas consumed daily. It also had 6,000 pizza establishments, out of a total of 25,000 in the country (24%).

The date 10 July is "Pizza Day" in São Paulo, marking the final day of an annual competition among pizzaioli. In São Paulo, almost every local neighborhood pizzeria uses wood-fired brick ovens.

Brazil is mostly liberal when it comes to pizza toppings. Apart from ketchup, commonly added to pizzas by customers in some regions and sometimes frowned upon by foreigners, Brazilian pizzas are sometimes very exotic, with choices such as chicken or beef Stroganoff pizza; cheeseburger pizza; French fries pizza; fettuccine pizza; among others.

Sweet pizzas are also very common in Brazil, and usually fall into one of two main categories: chocolate or banana. Chocolate pizzas are more versatile in their ingredients, being topped with chocolate sprinkles to mimic a brigadeiro, M&M's, strawberries or sometimes brownie chunks or even ice cream. Banana pizzas, on the other hand, are usually covered in sugar and cinnamon, and sometimes have a layer of mozzarella beneath the bananas.

Stuffed crusts are also available for sweet pizzas: they can be stuffed with a variety of chocolates, or even hazelnut and cocoa creams.

=== Uruguay ===
Popular varieties include pizza rellena (stuffed pizza), pizza por metro (pizza by the meter), and pizza a la parrilla (grilled pizza). While Uruguayan pizza largely derives from Neapolitan cuisine, yeast-leavened Sicilian pizza is common on events such as birthdays or reunions under the name pizza de cumpleaños (birthday pizza). The figazza derives from focaccia genovese (Genoan) and consists of a thick pizza dough topped with onions and sometimes olives and/or bell peppers; less common is the addition of mozzarella on top of the onion layer.

== See also ==
- List of pizza chains
