= Pizza quattro formaggi =

Italian pizza with four variants of cheese melted together

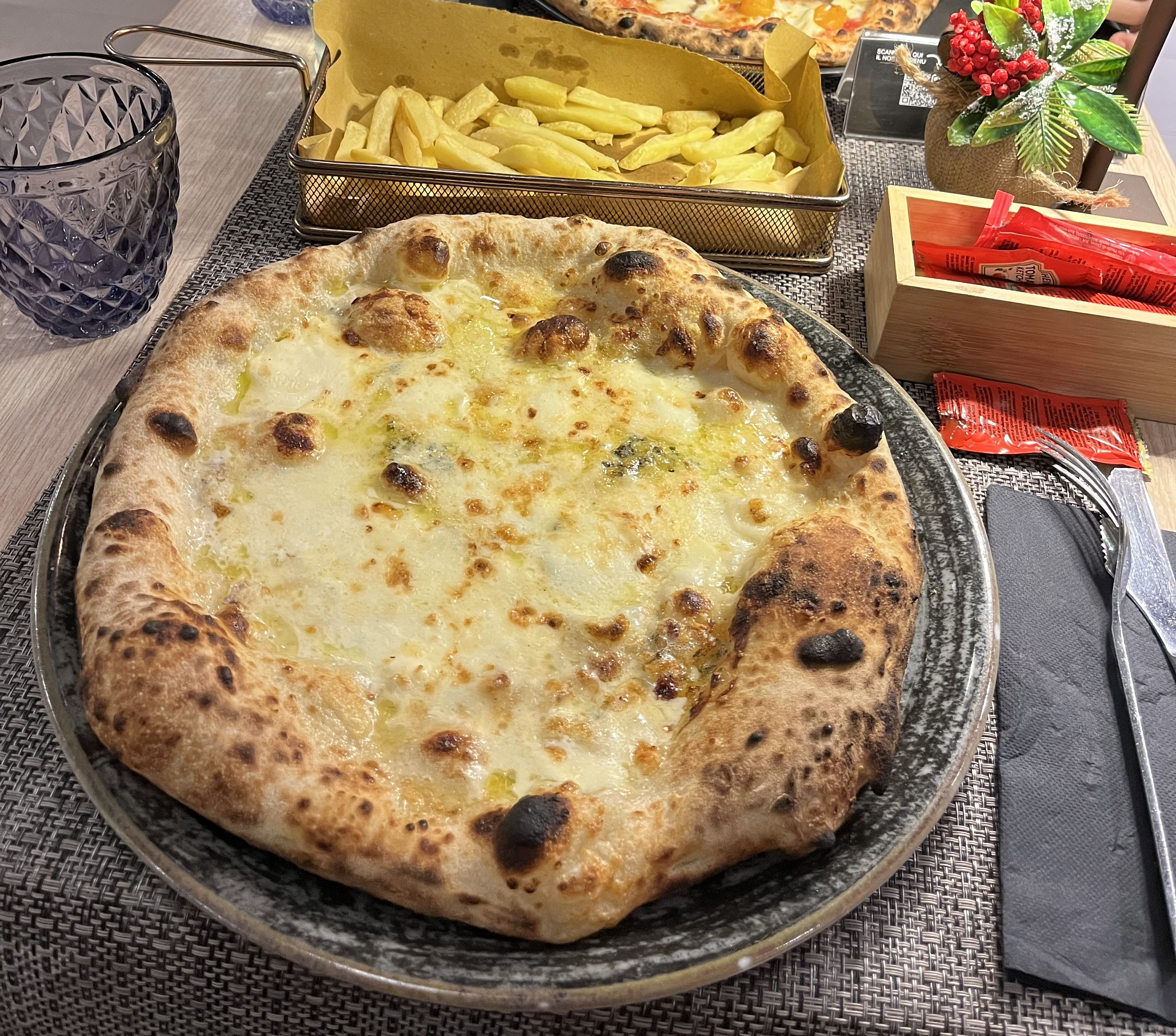
- Alternative names: Pizza ai quattro formaggi
- Type: Pizza
- Place of origin: Italy
- Main ingredients: Mozzarella, Gorgonzola, fontina, Parmesan

Pizza quattro formaggi (Italian: [ˈkwattro forˈmaddʒi]; lit. 'four-cheese pizza'), also known as pizza ai quattro formaggi, is a style of pizza in Italian cuisine that is topped with a combination of four types of cheese, usually melted together, with (rossa, lit. 'red') or without (bianca, lit. 'white') tomato sauce. It is popular worldwide, including in Italy, and is one of the iconic items from pizzerias' menus.

== History ==
Traditionally, the cheeses include mozzarella, as the fundamental component, which maintains humidity during cooking, partially protecting the other cheeses from the strong heat of the oven. Gorgonzola is almost invariably present, and the completing duo consists of other local cheeses, depending on the region, with fontina and Parmesan as the typical complements, but other variants include pecorino, Grana Padano, taleggio, smoked scamorza, provolone or caciocavallo. Beside mozzarella, mass-produced pizzas often use Parmesan, pecorino romano, asiago, and other Italian-style cheeses, although some use non-Italian cheeses such as edam, emmental, and blue cheese.

Unlike other pizzas, such as the Neapolitan or the Margherita, which have an old, rich, and documented history, the quattro formaggi, despite its popularity and preponderance, has a less clear origin, certainly due to its composition being so obvious. It is believed to originate from the Lazio region at the beginning of the 18th century. Conversely, more recent variants like quattro lati pizza have clearer origins in the history of gastronomy.

== See also ==
- List of pizza varieties by country
