= Pizza quattro stagioni =

Pizza with artichokes, mushroom, ham

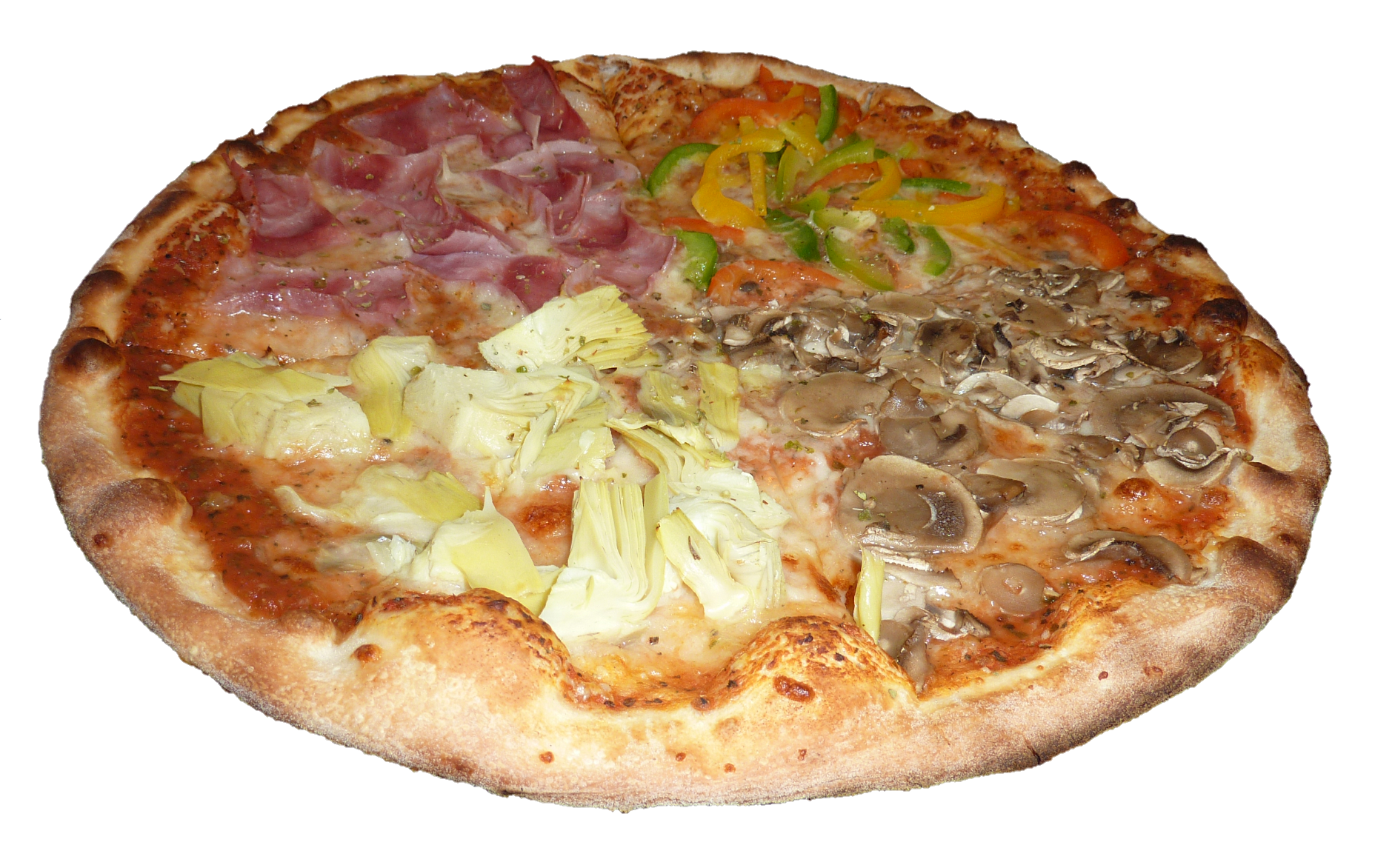
- Alternative names: Pizza 4 stagioni, pizza alle quattro stagioni, la quattro stagioni
- Type: Pizza
- Place of origin: Italy
- Region or state: Campania
- Main ingredients: tomato sauce, mozzarella, extra virgin oil, artichokes, prosciutto, mushrooms, olives

Pizza quattro stagioni (lit. 'four seasons pizza'), also known as pizza 4 stagioni, pizza alle quattro stagioni, or la quattro stagioni, is a style of pizza in Italian cuisine that is prepared in four sections with diverse ingredients, with each section representing one season of the year.

Artichokes represent spring (a symbol of a new awakening), prosciutto represent summer, mushrooms represent autumn (a symbol of the autumn forest floor's abundance) and black olives represent winter. It is a very popular pizza in Italy, and has been described as a "classic", "famous", and "renowned" Italian pizza. It is a variant of pizza capricciosa, with the same ingredients but mixed.

== Preparation ==
Standard classic Pizza quattro stagioni is typically prepared using a tomato sauce, mozzarella and extra virgin as the base. It is most often made by adding artichokes, mushrooms, prosciutto, and black olives to four separate sections of the pizza. Other ingredients may also be used. Fresh-cooked or canned artichoke hearts may be used. Some modern variations use cherry tomatoes and basil.

Some of the topping ingredients can be partially oven-dried so they do not make the pizza soggy. Baking it on a pizza stone can also prevent sogginess. The pizza may be finished with olive oil drizzled atop the pizza. It can be sliced into wedges or into its four sections. Pizza quattro stagioni can be vegetarian if prosciutto is substituted by a vegetarian option.

== Original Italian recipe ==
=== Base ===
| Tomato sauce | Mozzarella | Extra virgin oil |

=== Original toppings by seasons ===
| Artichokes | Prosciutto | Mushrooms | Black olives |
|---|---|---|---|
| sredina | | | |
| Spring | Summer | Autumn | Winter |

=== Variations ===
- Some modern international variations include sliced cherry tomatos and basil as the summer topping.

== See also ==
Media related to Pizza quattro stagioni at Wikimedia Commons

- List of pizza varieties by country
