= Pizza =

Italian dish

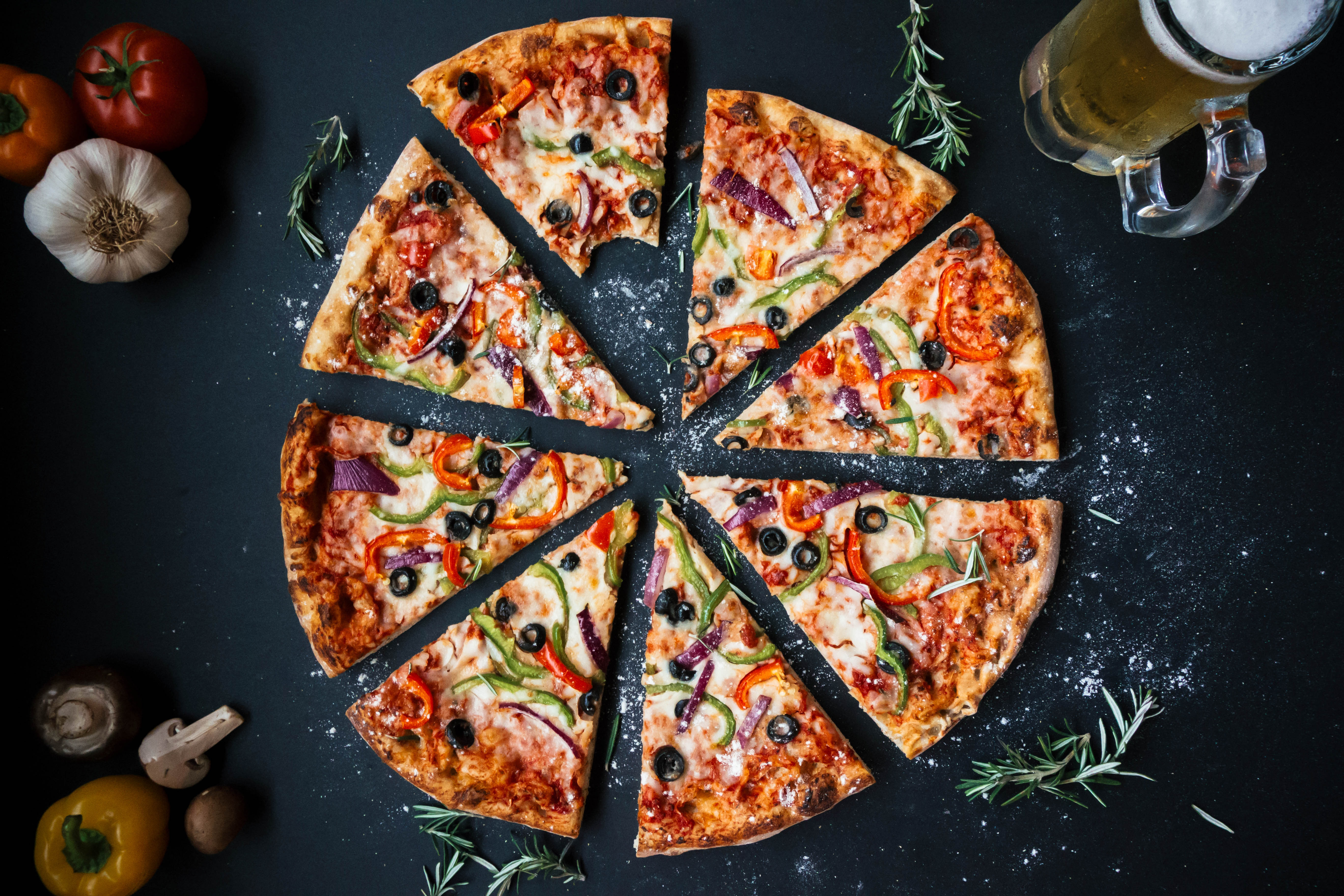
- A vegetarian pizza divided into eight slices
- Type: Flatbread
- Course: One course meal
- Place of origin: Italy
- Region or state: Naples, Campania
- Serving temperature: Hot or warm
- Main ingredients: Dough, sauce (usually tomato sauce), cheese (typically mozzarella)
- Similar dishes: Calzone, panzerotti

Pizza (Note: English: /ˈpiːtsə/ PEET-sə, Italian: [ˈpit.t͡sa], Neapolitan: [ˈpitt͡sə].) is an Italian dish typically consisting of a flat base of leavened wheat-based dough topped with tomato, cheese, and other ingredients, baked at a high temperature, traditionally in a wood-fired oven.

The term pizza was first recorded in AD 997, in a Latin manuscript from the southern Italian town of Gaeta, in Lazio, on the border with Campania. Raffaele Esposito is often credited with creating the modern version of pizza in Naples at the end of the 19th century. In 2009, Neapolitan pizza was registered with the European Union as a traditional speciality guaranteed (TSG) dish. In 2017, the art of making Neapolitan pizza was included on UNESCO's list of intangible cultural heritage.

Pizza and its variants are among the most popular foods in the world. Pizza is sold at a variety of restaurants, including pizzerias, Mediterranean restaurants, via delivery, and as street food. In Italy, pizza served in a restaurant is presented unsliced, and is eaten with the use of a knife and fork. In casual settings, however, it is typically cut into slices to be eaten while held in the hand. Pizza is also sold in grocery stores in a variety of forms, including frozen or as kits for self-assembly. Store-bought pizzas are then cooked using a home oven.

In 2017, the world pizza market was US$128 billion; in the US, it was $44 billion spread over 76,000 pizzerias. Between 2017 and March 2020, about 11% of the US population consumed pizza on any given day.

== Etymology ==
The oldest recorded usage of the word pizza is thought to be from May 997 AD, appearing in the Codex diplomaticus Caietanus, a notarial Latin document from the town of Gaeta, then still part of the Byzantine Empire. The text states that a tenant of certain property is to give the bishop of Gaeta duodecim pizze (lit. 'twelve pizzas'), a pork shoulder and kidney annually on Christmas Day, and twelve pizzas and a couple of chickens annually on Easter Sunday.

Suggested etymologies include:

- Byzantine Greek and Late Latin pitta > pizza, cf. Modern Greek pita bread and the Apulia and Calabrian (then Byzantine Italy) pitta, a round flat bread baked in the oven at high temperature sometimes with toppings. The word pitta can in turn be traced to either Ancient Greek πικτή (pikte), 'fermented pastry', which in Latin became picta, or Ancient Greek πίσσα (pissa, Attic: πίττα, pitta), 'pitch', or πήτεα (pḗtea), 'bran' (πητίτης, pētítēs, 'bran bread').
- The Etymological Dictionary of the Italian Language explains it as coming from dialectal pinza, 'clamp', as in modern Italian pinze, 'pliers, pincers, tongs, forceps'. Their origin is from Latin pinsere, 'to pound, stamp'.
- The Lombardic word bizzo or pizzo, meaning 'mouthful' (related to the English words bit and bite), which was brought to Italy in the middle of the 6th century AD by the invading Lombards. The shift b→p could be explained by the High German consonant shift, and it has been noted in this connection that in German the word Imbiss means 'snack'.

A person who makes pizza is known as a pizzaiolo.

The word pizza was borrowed from Italian into English in the 1930s; before it became well known, pizza was called "tomato pie" by English speakers. Some regional pizza variations still use the name tomato pie.

== History ==
Records of pizza-like foods can be found throughout ancient history from ancient Rome to the Middle Ages. In the 6th century BC, the Persian soldiers of the Achaemenid Empire during the rule of Darius the Great baked flatbreads with cheese and dates on top of their battle shields and the ancient Greeks supplemented their bread with oils, herbs, and cheese. An early reference to a pizza-like food occurs in the Aeneid, when Celaeno, queen of the Harpies, foretells that the Trojans would not find peace until they are forced by hunger to eat their tables (Book III). In Book VII, Aeneas and his men are served a meal that includes round cakes (such as pita bread) topped with cooked vegetables. When they eat the bread, they realize that these are the "tables" prophesied by Celaeno. In 2023, archeologists discovered a fresco in Pompeii appearing to depict a pizza-like dish among other foodstuffs and staples on a silver platter. Italy's culture minister said it "may be a distant ancestor of the modern dish". The first mention of the word pizza seemingly comes from a notarial document written in Latin and dating to 997 AD from Gaeta, demanding a payment of "twelve pizzas, a pork shoulder, and a pork kidney on Christmas Day, and 12 pizzas and a couple of chickens on Easter Day".

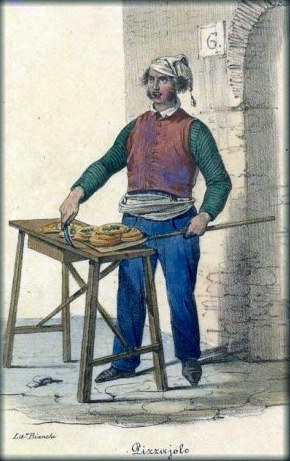
An illustration from 1830 of a pizzaiolo in Naples

Modern pizza evolved from similar flatbread dishes in Naples, Italy, in the 18th or early 19th century. Before that time, flatbread was often topped with ingredients such as garlic, salt, lard, and cheese. It is uncertain when tomatoes were first added and there are many conflicting claims, although it certainly could not have been before the 16th century and the Columbian Exchange. Pizza was sold from open-air stands and out of pizza bakeries until about 1830, when pizzerias in Naples started to have stanze with tables where clients could sit and eat their pizzas on the spot.

A popular legend holds that the archetypal pizza, pizza Margherita, was invented in 1889, when the Royal Palace of Capodimonte commissioned the Neapolitan pizzaiolo ('pizza maker') Raffaele Esposito to create a pizza in honor of the visiting Queen Margherita. Of the three different pizzas he created, the queen strongly preferred a pizza swathed in the colors of the Italian flag—red (tomato), white (mozzarella), and green (basil). Supposedly, this type of pizza was then named after the queen, with an official letter of recognition from the queen's "head of service" remaining to this day on display in Esposito's shop, now called the Pizzeria Brandi. Later research cast doubt on this legend, undermining the authenticity of the letter of recognition, pointing that no media of the period reported about the supposed visit and that both the story and name Margherita were first promoted in the 1930s–1940s.

Pizza was taken to the United States by Italian immigrants in the late 19th century and first appeared in areas where they concentrated. The country's first pizzeria, Lombardi's, opened in New York City in 1905. Italian Americans migrating from East to West brought the dish with them, and from there, the American version was exported to the rest of the world.

Pizza appeared in the United Kingdom after World War II when Italian immigrants opened up Italian restaurants in London. The dish really began to take hold in the UK when Peter Boizot, an English entrepreneur who had tasted Neapolitan pizza during a trip to Italy in 1948, opened London's first known pizzeria, PizzaExpress, in 1965. Boizot's chain expanded to over 500 outlets across the UK and Ireland, before expanding overseas.

The Associazione Verace Pizza Napoletana (lit. 'True Neapolitan Pizza Association') is a non-profit organization founded in 1984 headquartered in Naples that aims to promote traditional Neapolitan pizza. In 2009, upon Italy's request, Neapolitan pizza was registered with the European Union as a traditional speciality guaranteed (TSG) dish, and in 2017 the art of its making was included on UNESCO's list of intangible cultural heritage.

== Preparation ==
Pizza is sold fresh or frozen, whole or in portion-size slices. Methods have been developed to overcome challenges such as preventing the sauce from combining with the dough, and producing a crust that can be frozen and reheated without becoming rigid. There are frozen pizzas with raw ingredients and self-rising crusts.

In the US, another form of pizza is available from take and bake pizzerias. This pizza is assembled in the store, then sold unbaked to customers to bake in their own ovens. Some grocery stores sell fresh dough along with sauce and basic ingredients, to assemble at home before baking in an oven.

Pizza preparation

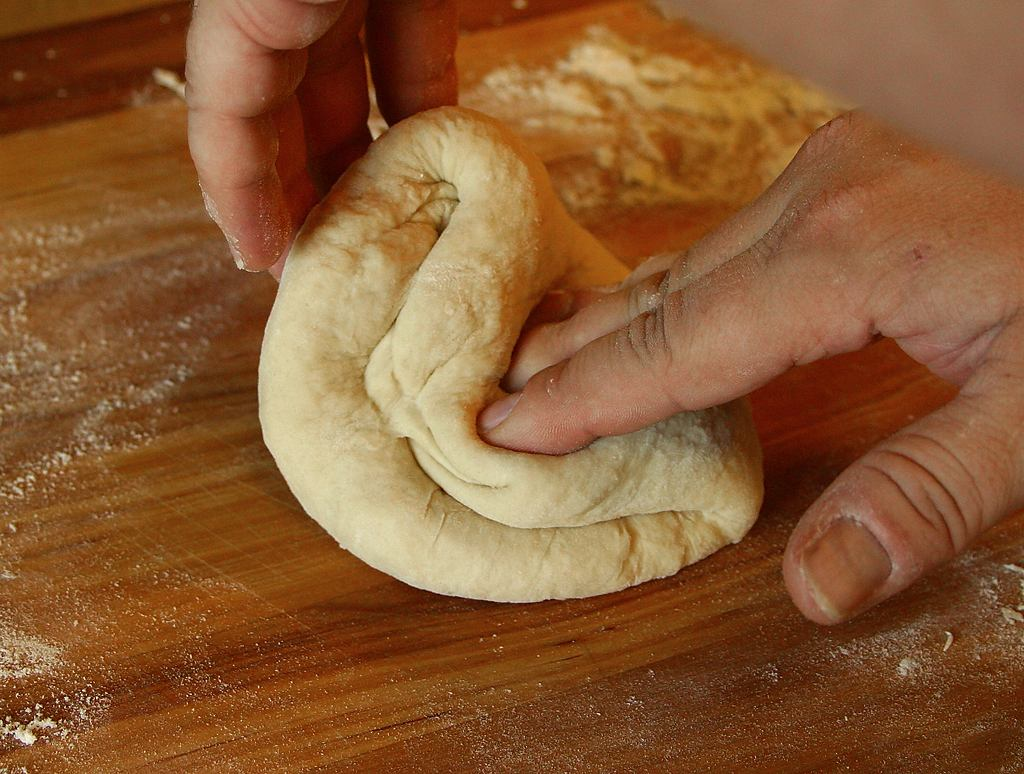
Pizza dough being kneaded before being left undisturbed and allowed time to proof

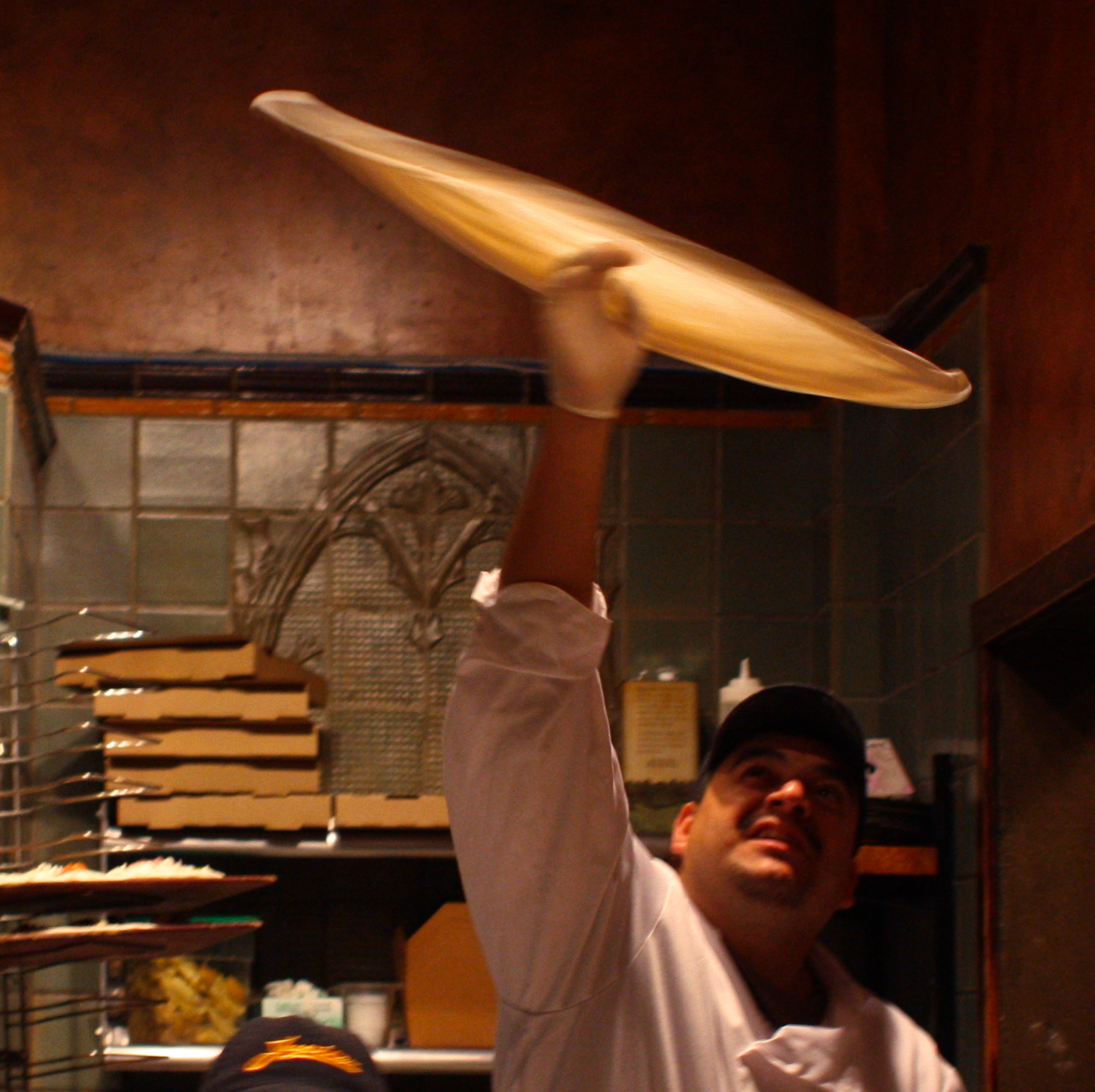
Tossing pizza dough to stretch it

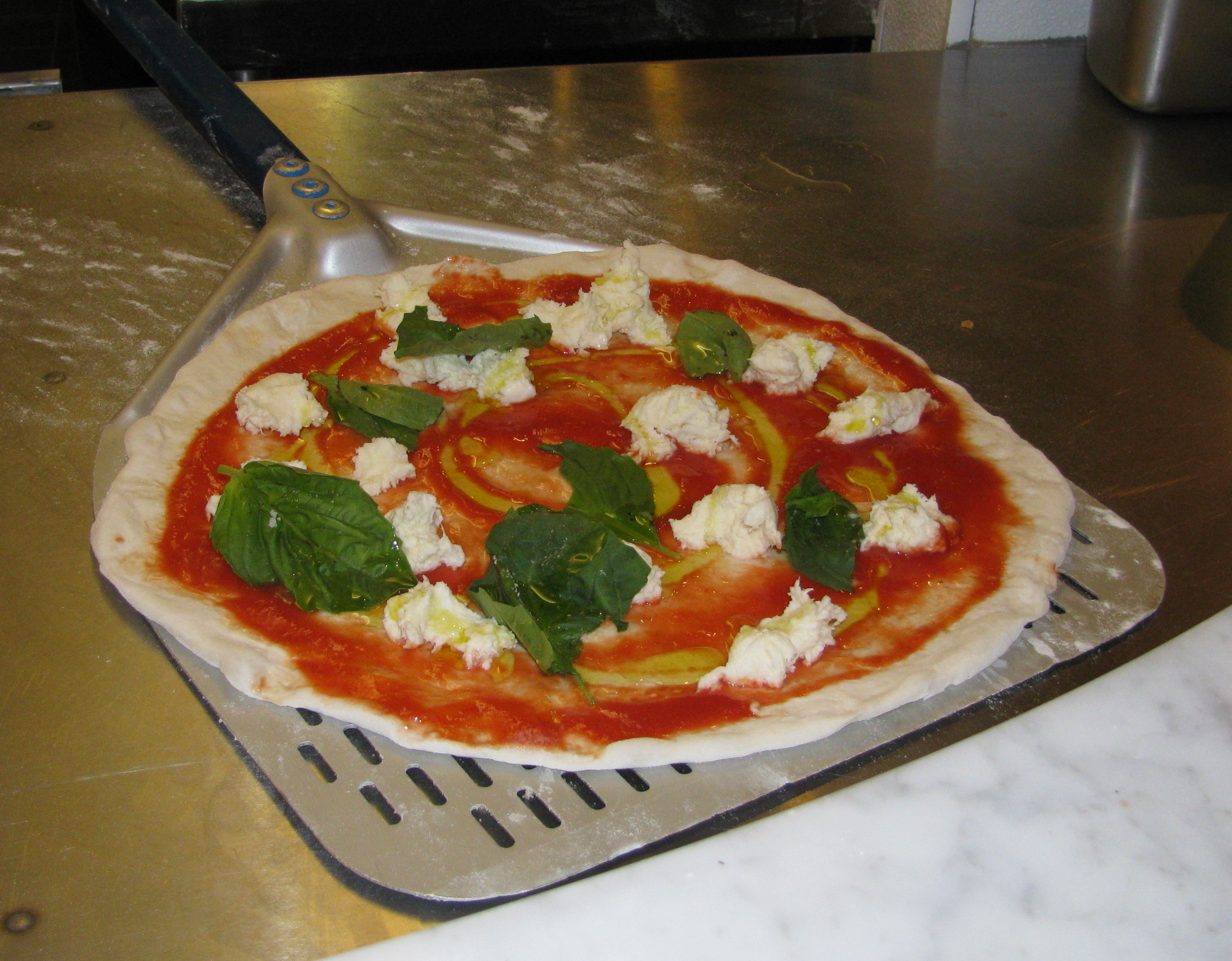
An unbaked Neapolitan pizza on a metal peel, ready for the oven

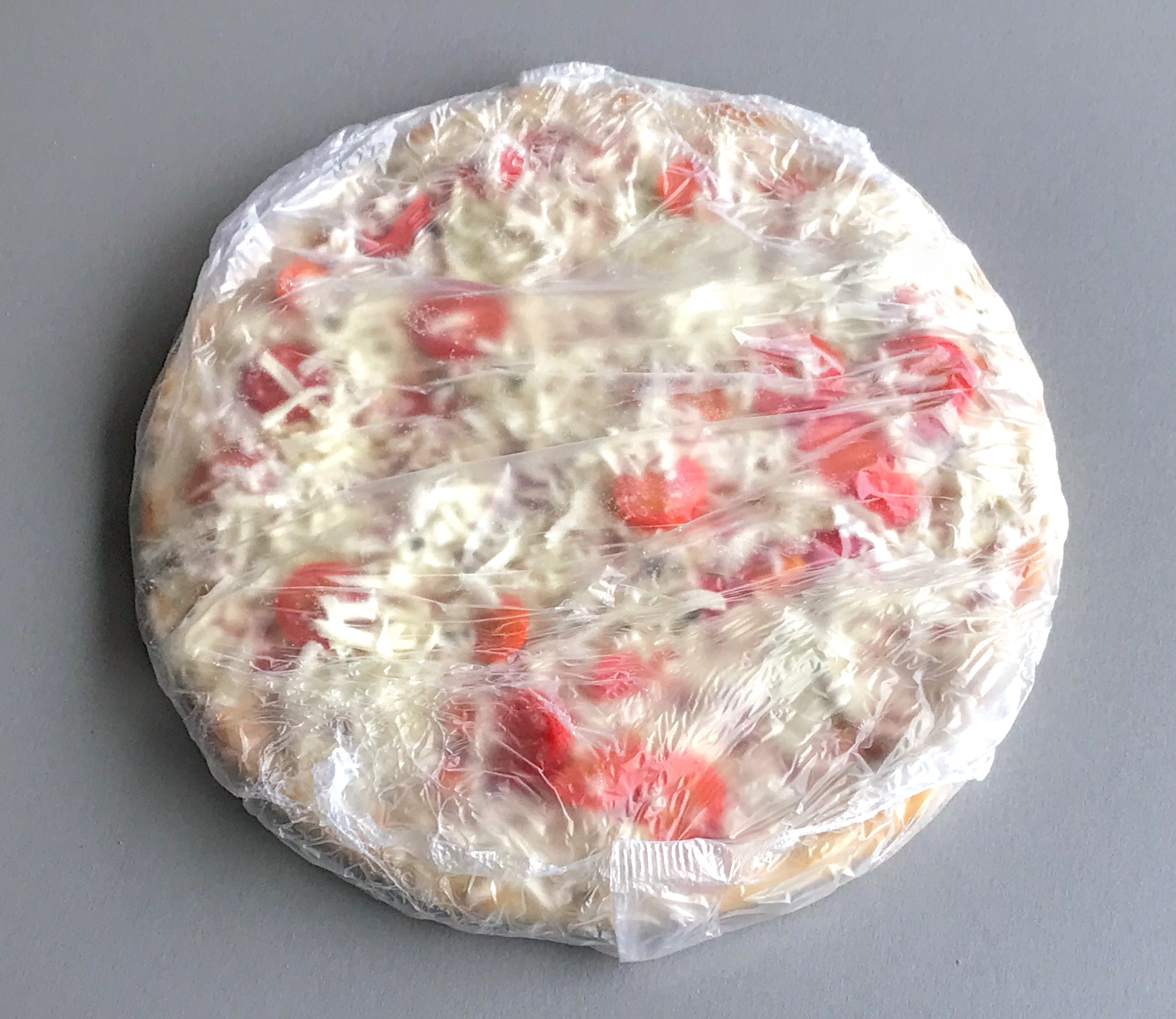
A wrapped, mass-produced frozen pizza to be baked at home

=== Baking ===
In restaurants, pizza can be baked in an oven with fire bricks above the heat source, an electric deck oven, a conveyor belt oven, or in traditional style in a wood or coal-fired brick oven. The pizza is slid into the oven on a long paddle, called "peel", and baked directly on hot bricks, a screen (a round metal grate, typically aluminum), or whatever the oven surface is. Before use, a peel is typically sprinkled with cornmeal to allow the pizza to easily slide on and off it. When made at home, a pizza can be baked on a pizza stone in a regular oven to reproduce some of the heating effect of a brick oven. Cooking directly on a metal surface results in too rapid heat transfer to the crust, burning it. Some home chefs use a wood-fired pizza oven, usually installed outdoors. As in restaurants, these are often dome-shaped, as pizza ovens have been for centuries, in order to achieve even heat distribution. Another variation is grilled pizza, in which the pizza is baked directly on a barbecue grill. Some types, such as Sicilian pizza, are baked in a pan rather than directly on the bricks of the pizza oven.

Most restaurants use standard and purpose-built pizza preparation tables to assemble their pizzas. Mass production of pizza by chains can be completely automated.

Pizza baking

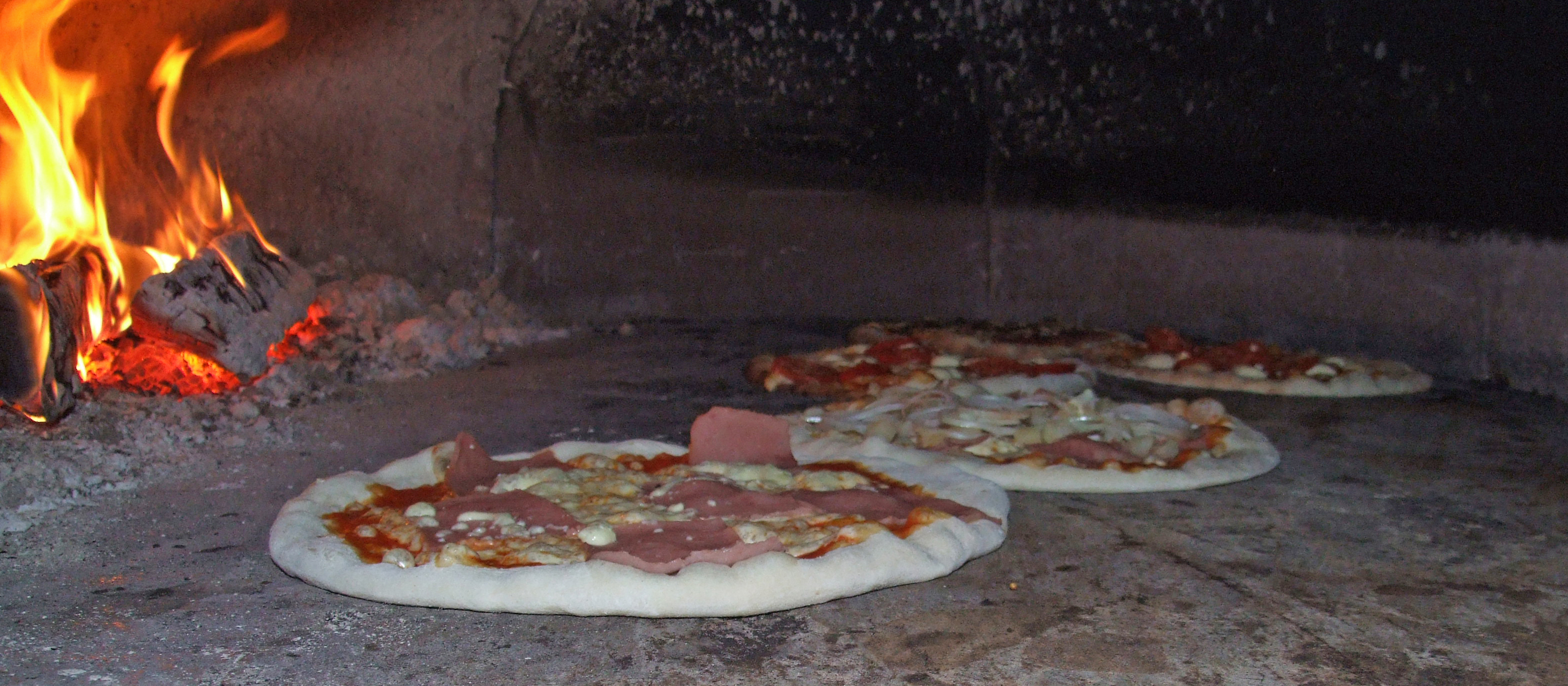
Pizzas baking in a traditional wood-fired brick oven

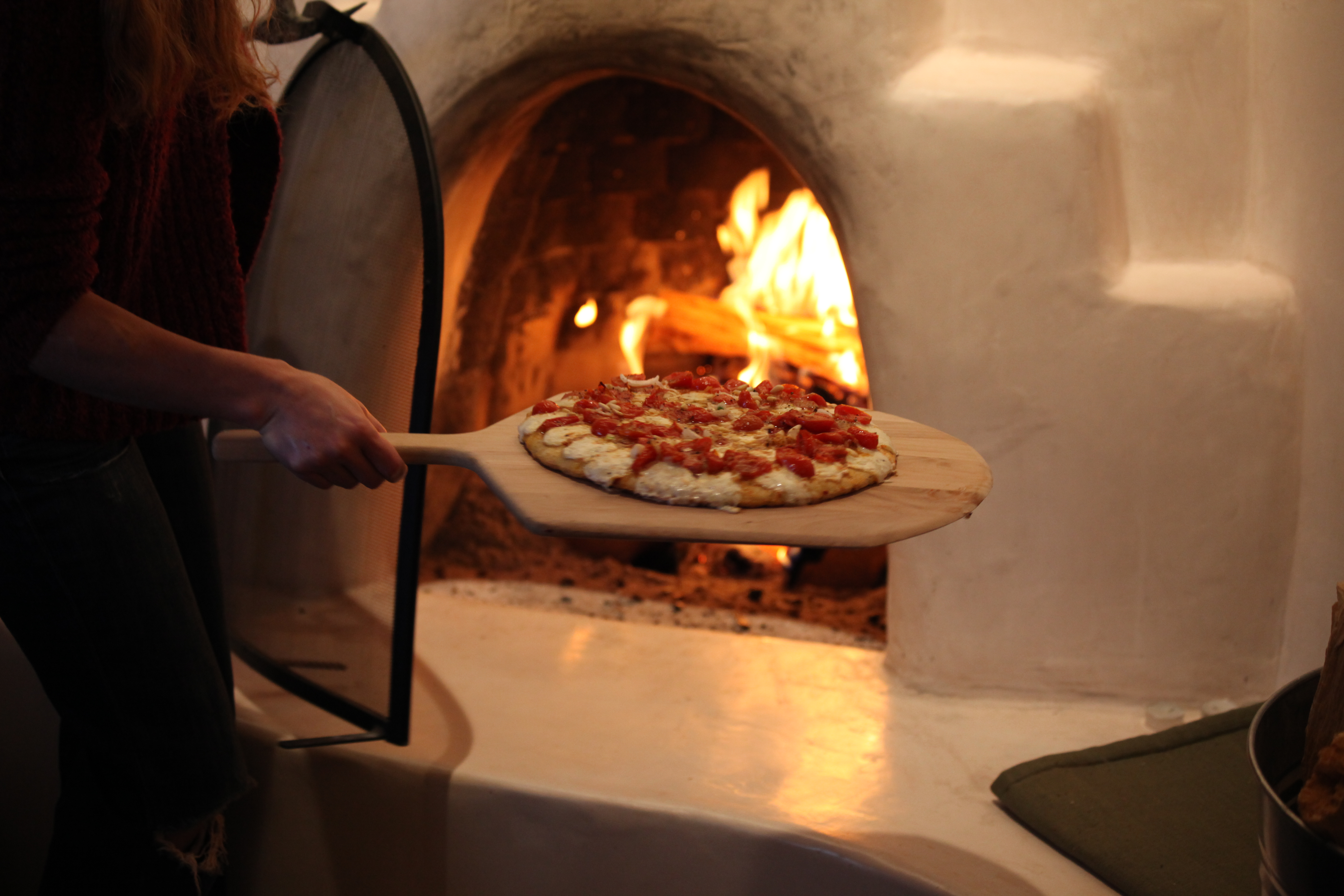
A pizza being removed with a wooden peel

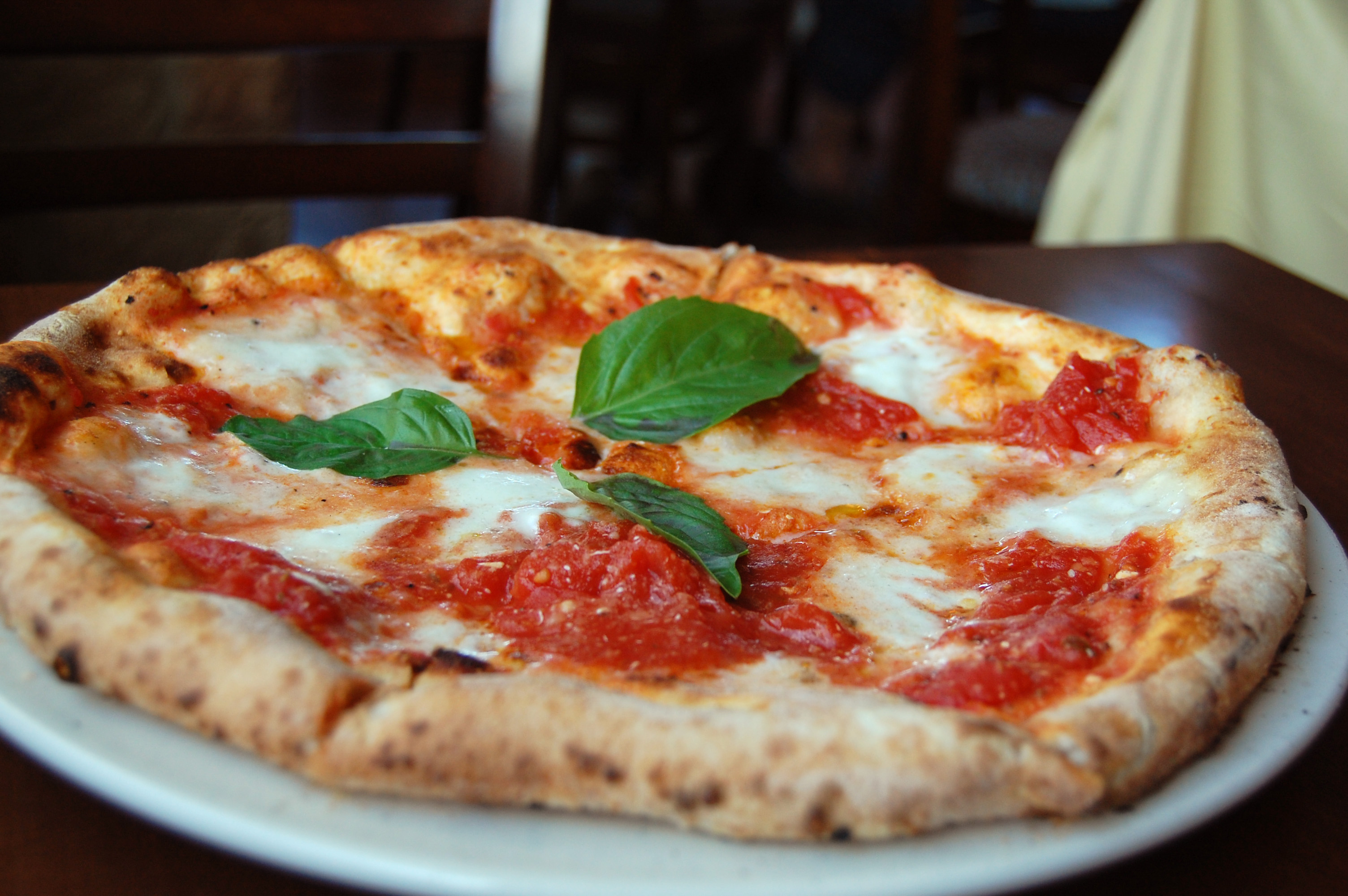
A pizza Margherita

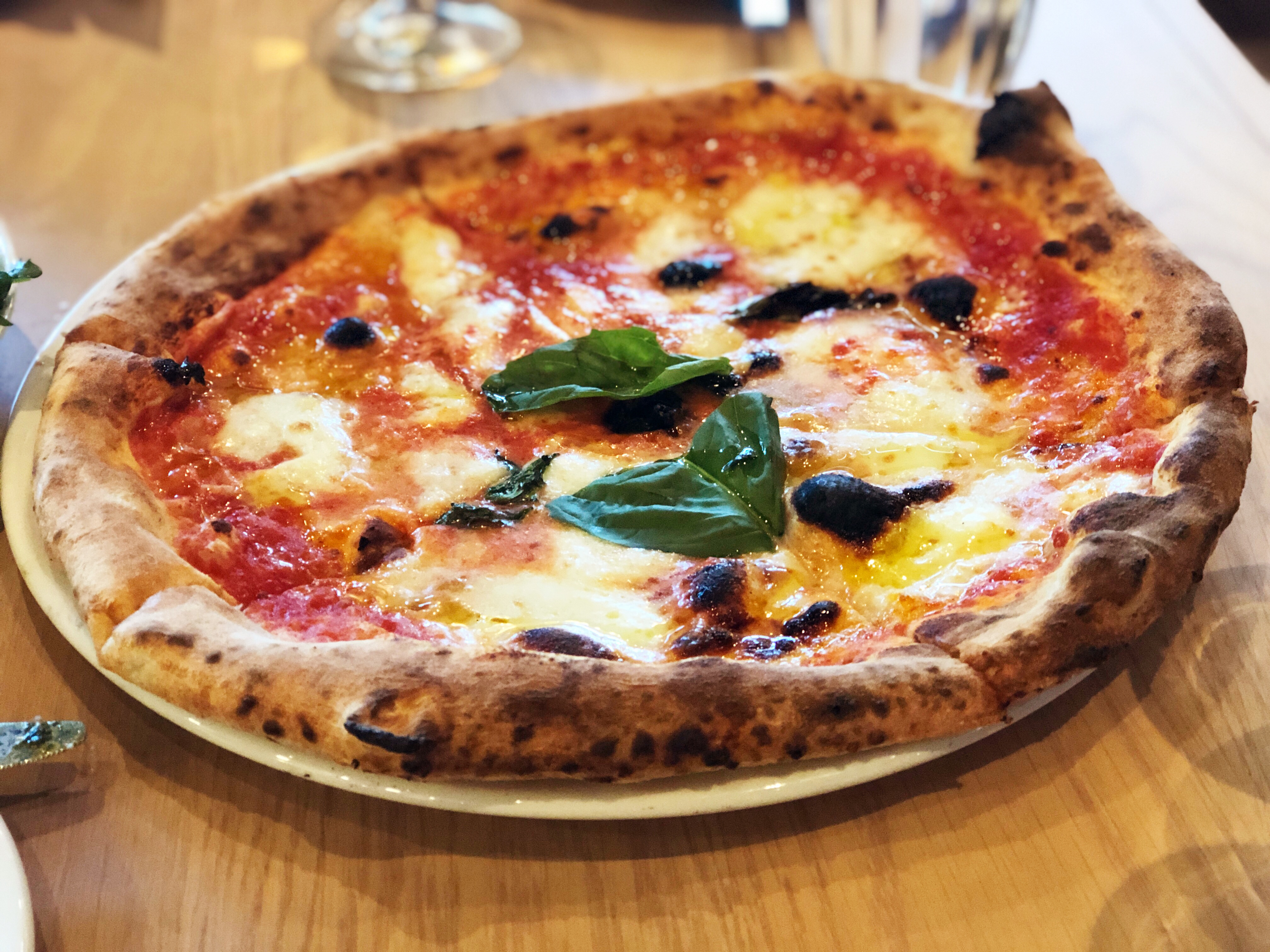
Charred crust on a pizza Margherita, an acceptable trait in artisanal pizza

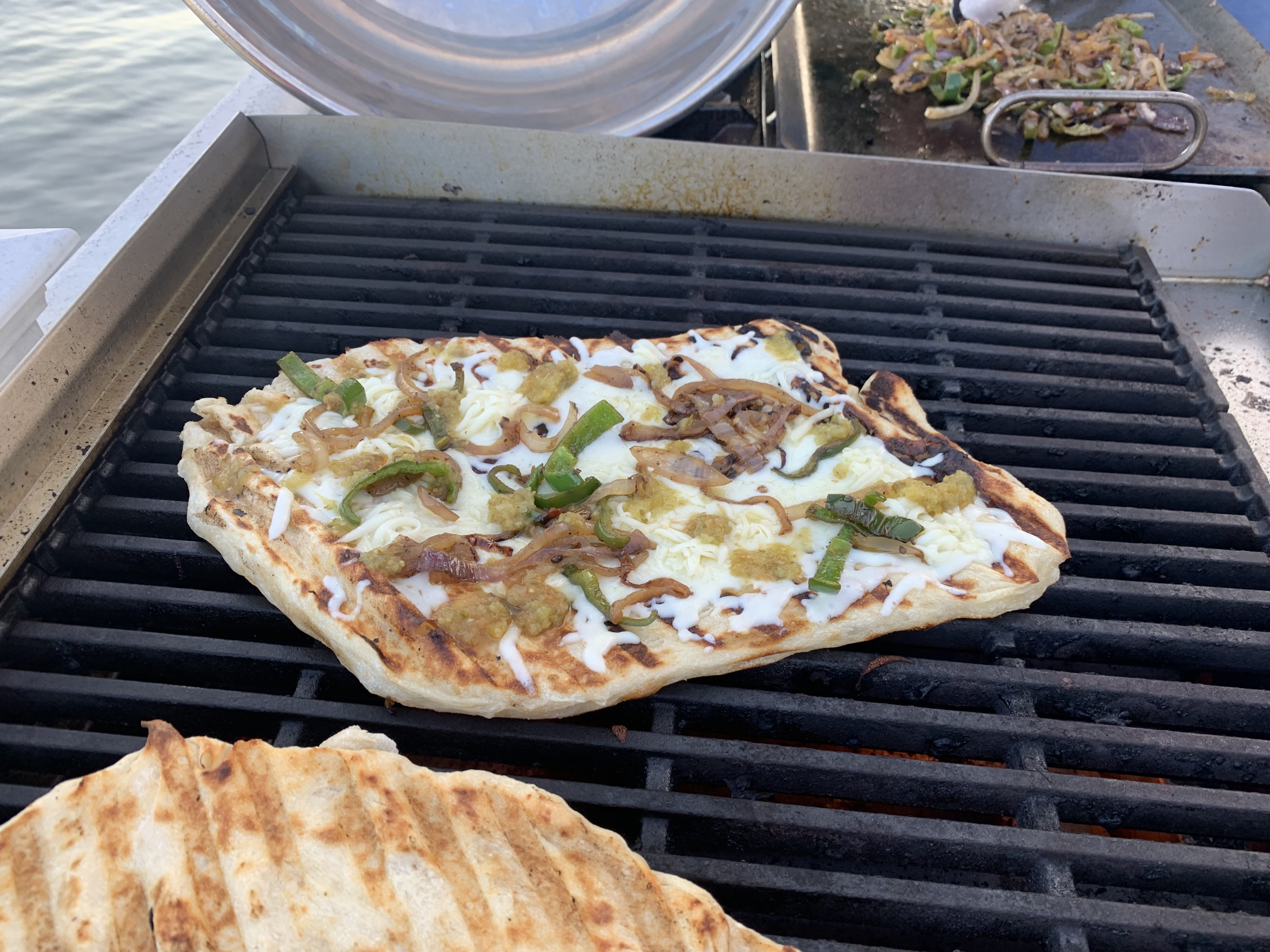
Pizza grilling on an outdoor gas range

=== Crust ===
The bottom of the pizza, called the "crust", may vary widely according to style—thin as in a typical hand-tossed Neapolitan pizza or thick as in a deep-dish Chicago-style. It is traditionally plain, but may also be seasoned with garlic or herbs, or stuffed with cheese. The outer edge of the pizza is sometimes referred to as the cornicione. Some pizza dough contains sugar, to help its yeast rise and enhance browning of the crust. The fermentation process can also alter the physical properties of pizza dough; studies of pizza dough have found that the microorganisms used for leavening and their fermentation conditions can affect dough elasticity and other rheological properties.

=== Cheese ===
Mozzarella is commonly used on pizza, with the buffalo mozzarella produced in the surroundings of Naples. Other cheeses are also used, particularly burrata, Gorgonzola, provolone, pecorino romano, ricotta, and scamorza. Less expensive processed cheeses or cheese analogues have been developed for mass-market pizzas to produce desirable qualities such as browning, melting, stretchiness, consistent fat and moisture content, and stable shelf life. This quest to create the ideal and economical pizza cheese has involved many studies and experiments analyzing the impact of vegetable oil, manufacturing and culture processes, denatured whey proteins, and other changes in manufacture. In 1997, it was estimated that annual production of pizza cheese was 1 million metric tons (1,100,000 short tons) in the US and 100,000 metric tons (110,000 short tons) in Europe.

== Varieties and styles ==
A great number of pizza varieties exist. These include pizzas defined by their toppings, their crust, their method of preparation, or all three. Pizza variations are often named after the region in which they first became prevalent, particularly in North America (such as New York–style pizza). Local varieties of pizza are often a staple of regional cuisines.

The following lists show some notable pizza varieties:

Italian varieties
Image	Name	Characteristic ingredients	Origin	First attested	Notes
	Pizza marinara	Tomato sauce, olive oil, oregano, garlic. No cheese.	Naples, Italy	1734	One of the oldest Neapolitan pizza.
	Pizza Margherita	Tomatoes, mozzarella, basil.	Naples, Italy	June 1889	The archetypical Neapolitan pizza.
	Pizza capricciosa	Artichokes, ham, mushrooms, olives, tomatoes.	Rome, Lazio, Italy	1937	Similar to pizza quattro stagioni, but with toppings mixed rather than separated.
	Pizza quattro stagioni	Artichokes, ham, mushrooms, olives, tomatoes.	Campania, Italy		The toppings are separated by quarter, representing the cycle of the seasons.
	Pizza quattro formaggi	Prepared using four types of cheese (Italian: [ˈkwattro forˈmaddʒi], 'four cheeses'): mozzarella, Gorgonzola and two others depending on the region.	Lazio, Italy	Its origins are not clearly documented, but it is believed to originate from the Lazio region at the beginning of the 18th century.	
	Seafood pizza	Seafood, such as fish, shellfish or squid.	Italy		Subvarieties include pizza ai frutti di mare (no cheese) and pizza pescatore (with mussels or squid).

Italian styles
Image	Name	Characteristics	Origin	First attested
	Calzone	Pizza folded in half turnover-style, baked.	Naples, Italy	
	Panzerotti	Similar to a calzone, but fried.	Apulia, Italy	
	Deep fried pizza (pizza fritta)	The pizza is deep fried (cooked in oil) instead of baked.	Naples, Italy	
	Pizzetta	Small pizza served as an hors d'oeuvre or snack.	Italy	

North American styles
Image	Name	Characteristics	Origin	First attested
	California-style pizza	Distinguished by the use of non-traditional ingredients, especially varieties of fresh produce.	California, U.S.	1980
	Chicago-style deep dish pizza	Baked in a pan with a high edge that holds in a thick layer of toppings. The crust is sometimes stuffed with cheese or other ingredients.	Chicago, U.S.	c. 1940s
	Detroit-style pizza	The cheese is spread to the edges and caramelizes against the high-sided heavyweight rectangular pan, giving the crust a lacy, crispy edge.	Detroit, U.S.	1946
	New Haven–style pizza	Distinguished by its thin, often oblong crust and characteristic charring.	New Haven, U.S.	1925
	New York–style pizza	Neapolitan-derived pizza with a characteristic thin foldable crust.	New York metropolitan area (and beyond)	Early 1900s
	St. Louis–style pizza	The style has a thin cracker-like crust made without yeast, generally uses Provel cheese, and is cut into squares or rectangles instead of wedges.	St. Louis, U.S.	1945
	Windsor–style pizza	Distinguished by the use of shredded pepperoni and canned mushrooms.	Windsor, Canada	1950s

=== By region of origin ===
==== Italy ====
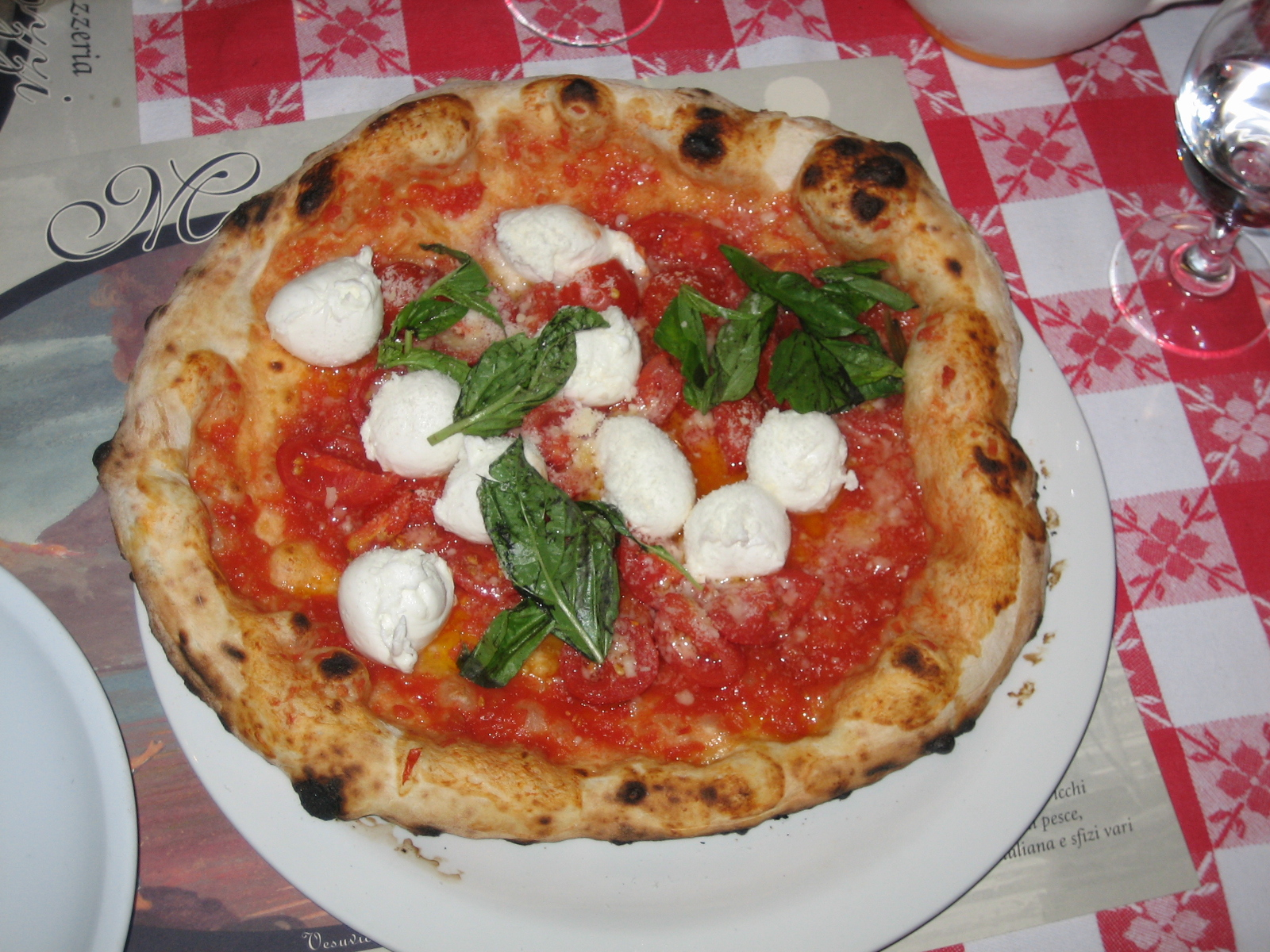
The ingredients of traditional pizza Margherita—tomatoes (red), mozzarella (white), and basil (green)—are held by popular legend to be inspired by the colors of the national flag of Italy.

Authentic Neapolitan pizza (Italian: pizza napoletana) is made with San Marzano tomatoes, grown on the volcanic plains south of Mount Vesuvius, and either mozzarella di bufala campana, made with milk from water buffalo raised in the marshlands of Campania and Lazio, or fior di latte. Buffalo mozzarella is protected with its own European protected designation of origin (PDO). Other traditional pizzas include pizza marinara, supposedly the most ancient tomato-topped pizza, and pizza capricciosa, which is prepared with mozzarella cheese, baked ham, mushroom, artichoke, and tomato.

A popular variant of pizza in Italy is Sicilian pizza, a thick-crust or deep-dish pizza originating during the 17th century in Sicily: it is essentially a focaccia that is typically topped with tomato sauce and other ingredients. Until the 1860s, Sicilian pizza was the type of pizza usually consumed in Sicily, especially in the Western portion of the island. Other variations of pizzas are also found in other regions of Italy, for example pizza al padellino or pizza al tegamino, a small-sized, thick-crust, deep-dish pizza typically served in Turin, Piedmont.

==== United States ====
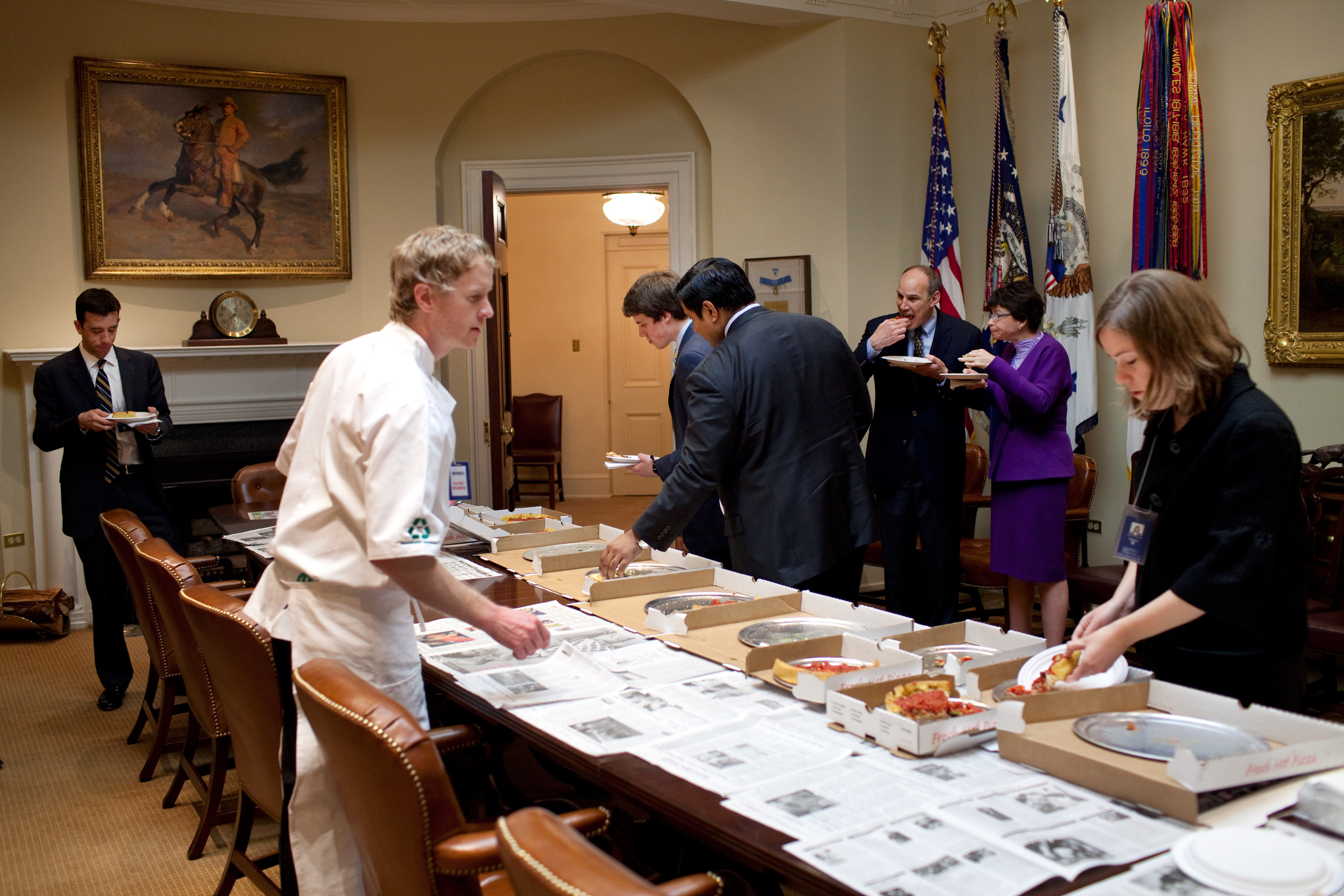
Pizza banquet in the White House serving Chicago-style pizza (2009)

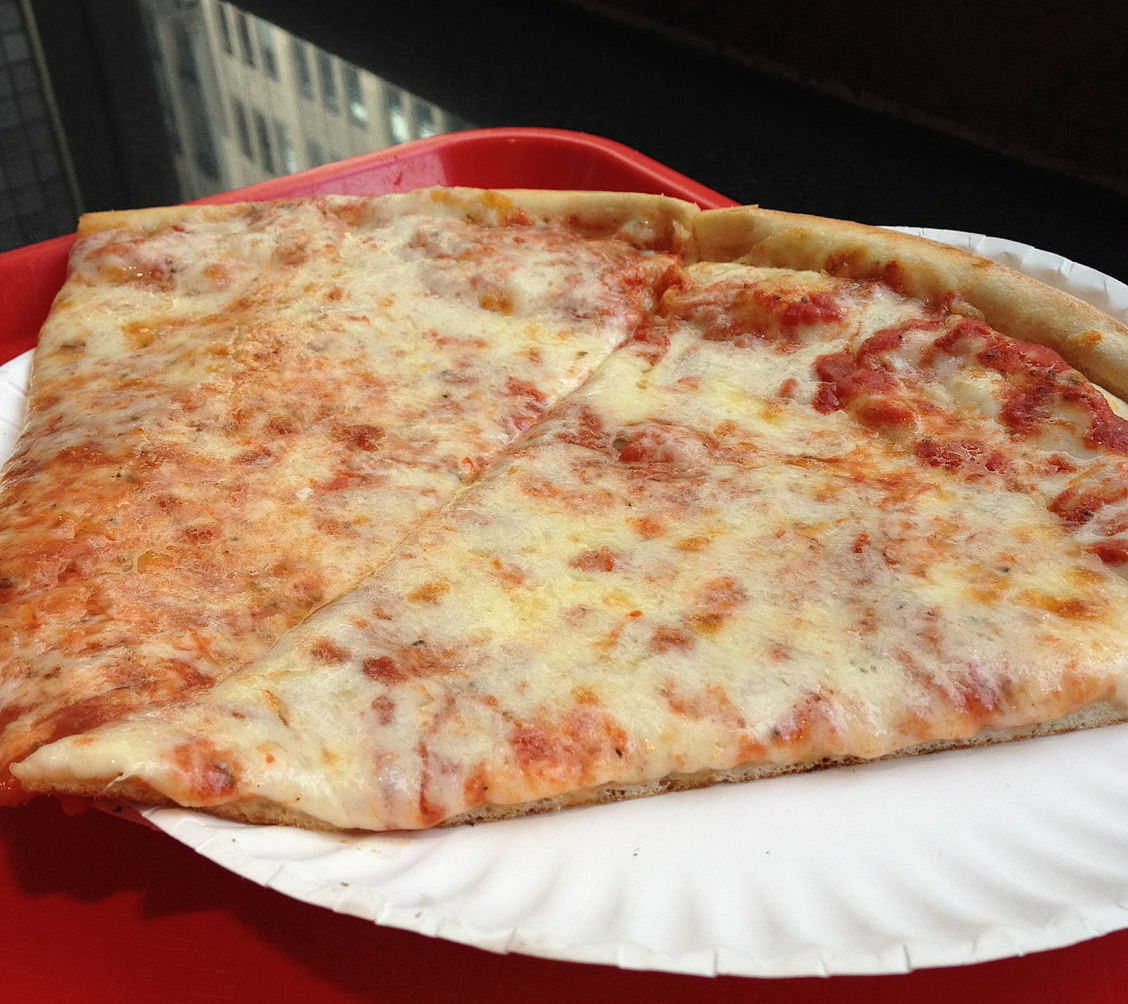
Caramelized crust of slices of New York–style pizza

The first pizzeria in the US was opened in New York City's Little Italy in 1905. Common toppings for pizza in the United States include anchovies, ground beef, chicken, eggplant, ham, mushrooms, olives, onions, peppers, pepperoni, pineapple, salami, sausage, spinach, steak, and tomatoes. A pizza with no toppings is called a "cheese pizza" or a "plain pizza". Distinct regional types developed in the 20th century, including Buffalo, California, Chicago, Detroit, Greek, New Haven, New York, and St. Louis styles. These regional variations include deep-dish, stuffed, pockets, turnovers, rolled, and pizza-on-a-stick, each with seemingly limitless combinations of sauce and toppings.

Between 2017 and March 2020, about 11% of the population consumed pizza on any given day. Pizza chains, pizzas from take and bake pizzerias, and chilled or frozen pizzas from supermarkets make pizza readily available nationwide. Pizza by the slice is available from a great variety of restaurants, and is particularly associated with New York City, where pizzerias are a cultural icon as well as major food purveyors.

==== Argentina ====
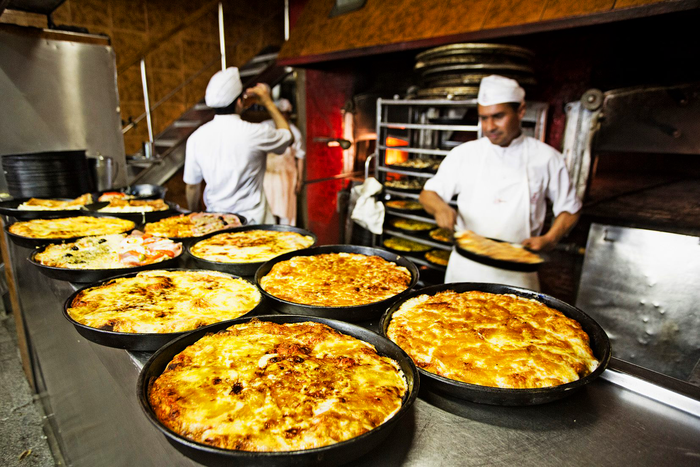
Traditional Argentine-style pizzas de molde being prepared at a pizzeria in Buenos Aires

Argentine pizza is a mainstay of the country's cuisine, especially of its capital Buenos Aires, where it is regarded as a cultural heritage and icon of the city. Argentina is the country with the most pizzerias per inhabitant in the world and, although they are consumed throughout the country, the highest concentration of pizzerias and customers is Buenos Aires, the city with the highest consumption of pizzas in the world (estimated in 2015 to be 14 million per year). As such, the city has been considered as one of the world capitals of pizza. The dish was introduced to Buenos Aires in the late 19th century with the massive Italian immigration, as part of a broader great European immigration wave to the country. Thus, around the same time that the iconic pizza Margherita was being invented in Italy, pizza were already being cooked in the Argentine capital. The impoverished Italian immigrants that arrived to the city transformed the originally modest dish into a much more hefty meal, motivated by the abundance of food in Argentina. In the 1930s, pizza was cemented as a cultural icon in Buenos Aires, with the new pizzerias becoming a central space for sociability for the working class people who flocked to the city.

The most characteristic style of Argentine pizza—which almost all the classic pizzerias in Buenos Aires specialize in—is the so-called pizza de molde (Spanish for 'pizza in the pan'), characterized by having a "thick, spongy base and elevated bready crust". This style, which today is identified as the typical style of Argentine pizza—characterized by a thick crust and a large amount of cheese—arose when impoverished Italian immigrants found a greater abundance of food in then-prosperous Argentina, which motivated them to transform the originally modest dish into a much more hefty meal suitable for a main course. The name pizza de molde emerged because there were no pizza ovens in the city, so bakers resorted to baking them in pans. Since they used bakery plates, Argentine pizzas were initially square or rectangular, a format associated with the 1920s that is still maintained in some classic pizzerias, especially for vegetable pizzas, fugazzetas or fugazzas.

Other styles of Argentine pizza include the iconic fugazza and its derivative fugazzeta or fugazza con queso (a terminology that varies depending on the pizzeria), or the pizza de cancha or canchera (a cheese-less variant). Most pizza menus include standard flavor combinations, including the traditional plain mozzarella, nicknamed "muza" or "musa"; the napolitana or "napo", with "cheese, sliced tomatoes, garlic, dried oregano and a few green olives", not to be confused with Neapolitan pizza; calabresa, with slices of longaniza; jamon y morrones, with sliced ham and roasted bell peppers; as well as versions with provolone, with anchovies, with hearts of palm, or with chopped hard boiled egg. A typical custom that is unique to Buenos Aires is to accompany pizza with fainá, a pancake made from chickpea flour.

=== Dessert pizza ===
The terms dessert pizza and sweet pizza are used for a variety of dishes resembling a pizza, including chocolate pizza and fruit pizza. Some are based on a traditional yeast dough pizza base, while others have a cookie-like base and resemble a traditional pizza solely in having a flat round shape with a distinct base and topping. Some pizza restaurants offer dessert pizzas.

== Nutrition ==
Many mass-produced pizzas by American pizza chains have been criticized as having an unhealthy balance of ingredients. Pizza can be high in salt and fat, and is high in calories. The USDA reports an average sodium content of 5,100 mg per 14 in (36 cm) pizza in fast food chains.

== Similar dishes ==
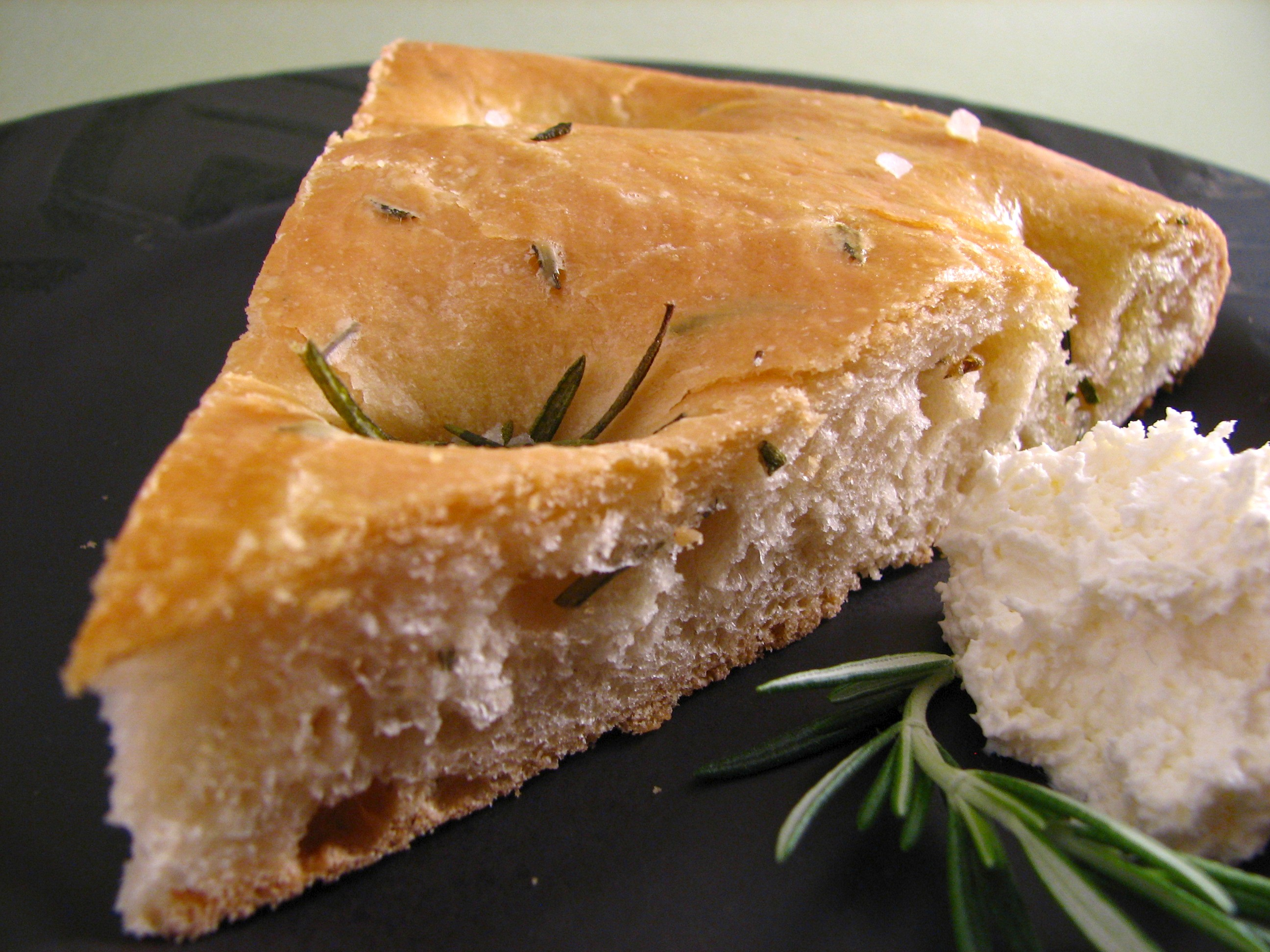
Focaccia al rosmarino

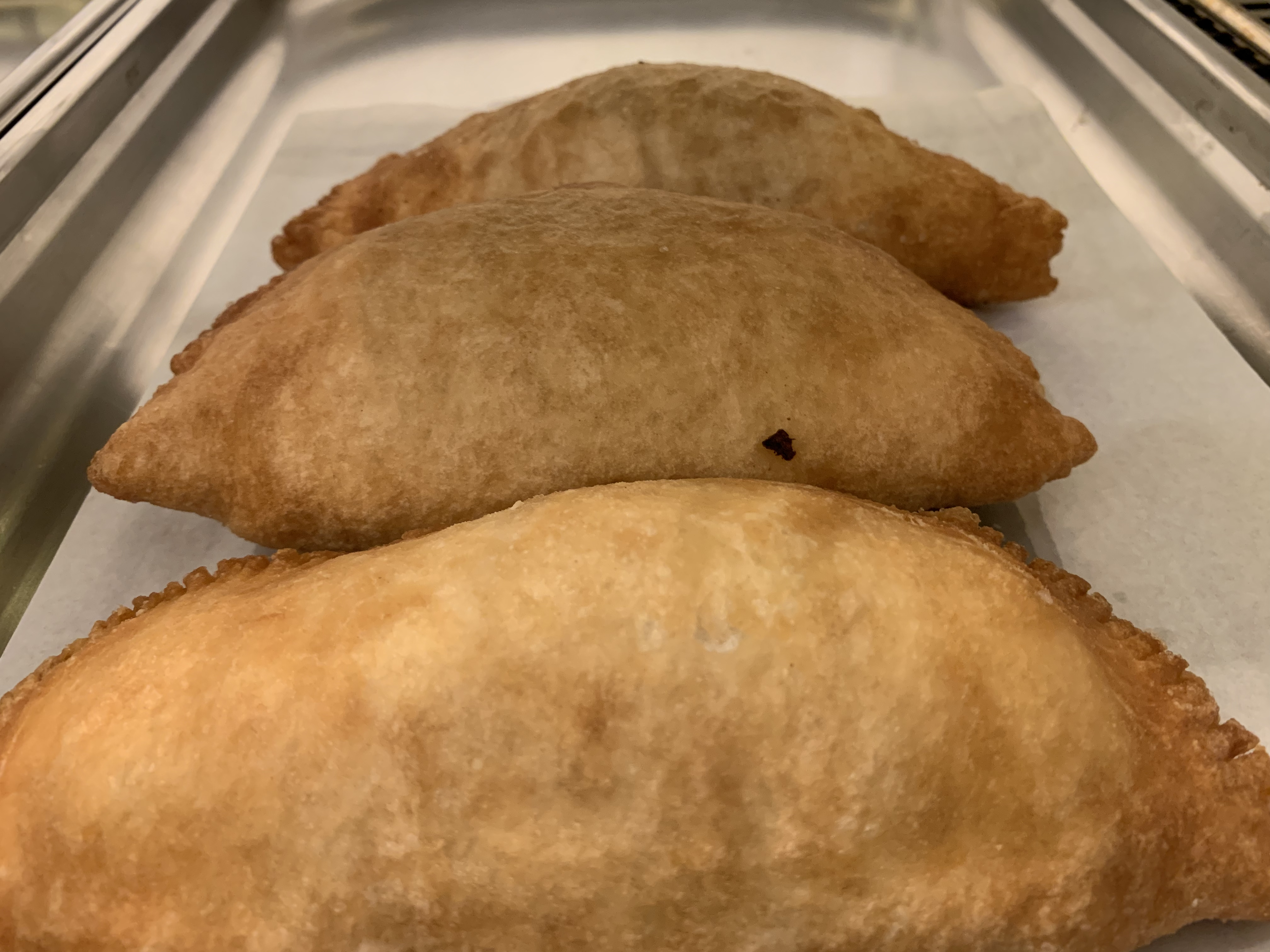
Panzerotti

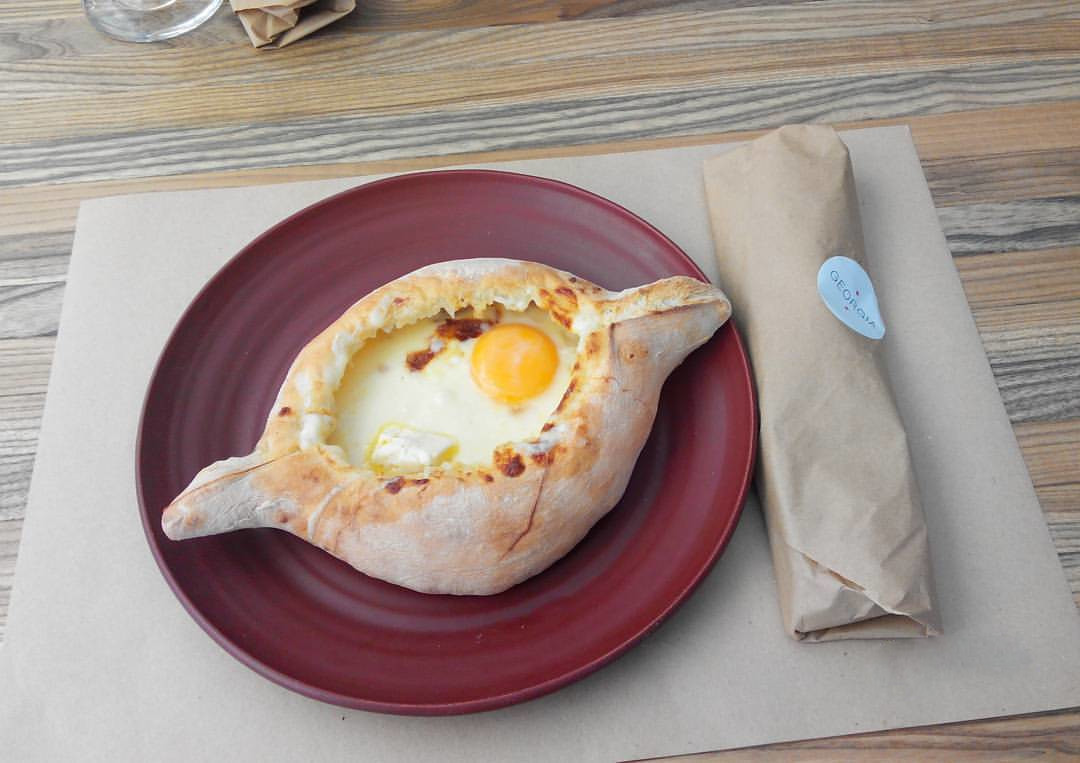
Khachapuri

- Calzone and stromboli are similar dishes that are often made of pizza dough folded (calzone) or rolled (stromboli) around a filling.
- Coca is a similar dish consumed mainly in Catalonia and neighboring regions, but that has extended to other areas in Spain, and to Algeria. There are sweet and savory versions.
- Farinata or cecina is a Ligurian (farinata) and Tuscan (cecina) regional dish. It is often baked in a brick oven, and typically weighed and sold by the slice.
- Flammekueche is a food speciality of the Alsace region.
- Focaccia is a flat leavened oven-baked Italian bread, similar in style and texture to pizza; in some places, it is called pizza bianca (lit. 'white pizza').
- Garlic fingers is an Atlantic Canadian dish, similar to a pizza in shape and size, and made with similar dough. It is garnished with melted butter, garlic, cheese, and sometimes bacon.
- Semsek is an Armenian dish made with dough thats shaped into a circle with braided edges. It is topped with a mixture of seasoned mixture of minced meat and puréed roasted vegetables such as tomatoes and peppers.
- Khachapuri is a Georgian dish that may resemble a cheese-filled bread, or a boat-shaped dough topped with cheese, butter and an egg.
- İçli pide, or simply pide, is a Turkish dish, similar to a pizza in being made of wheat-based dough topped with tomato, cheese, and other ingredients, and usually formed in a boat-like shape. It is sometimes sold as "Turkish pizza".
- Lahmacun is a Middle Eastern flatbread topped with minced meat; the base is very thin, and the layer of meat often includes chopped vegetables.
- Manakish is a Levantine flatbread dish.
- Matzah pizza is a Jewish pizza dish.
- Okonomiyaki, often referred to as "Japanese pizza", is a Japanese dish cooked on a hotplate.
- Panzerotti are similar to calzones, but fried rather than baked.
- Pastrmajlija (nicknamed Macedonian pizza) is a bread pie made from dough and meat. It is usually oval-shaped with chopped meat on top of it.
- Piadina is a thin Italian flatbread, typically prepared in the Romagna historical region.
- Pinsa (bread) is a flatbread with sauce applied after baking.
- Pissaladière is similar to an Italian pizza, with a slightly thicker crust and a topping of cooked onions, anchovies, and olives.
- Pizza bagel is a bagel with toppings similar to that of traditional pizzas.
- Pizza cake is a multiple-layer pizza.
- Pizza rolls are a frozen snack product.
- Pizza strips is a tomato pie of Italian-American origin.
- Sfiha is a Levantine flatbread with toppings.
- Wähe is a Swiss type of tart.
- Zanzibar pizza is a street food served in Stone Town, Zanzibar, Tanzania. It uses a dough much thinner than pizza dough, almost like filo dough, filled with minced beef, onions, and an egg, similar to Moroccan basṭīla.
- Zwiebelkuchen is a German onion tart, often baked with diced bacon and caraway seeds.

== See also ==
- List of baked goods
- List of pizza chains
- List of pizza varieties by country
- Pizza cheese – Cheese for use specifically on pizza
- Pizza delivery – Service in which a pizzeria delivers pizza to a customer
- Pizza farm – Farm split into sections like a pizza split into slices
- Pizza party – Social gathering at which pizza is eaten
- Pizza saver – Object used to prevent the top of a food container from collapsing
- Pizza theorem – Equality of areas of a sliced disk
- Pizza in the United States
