= Chocolate pizza =

Pizza prepared using chocolate

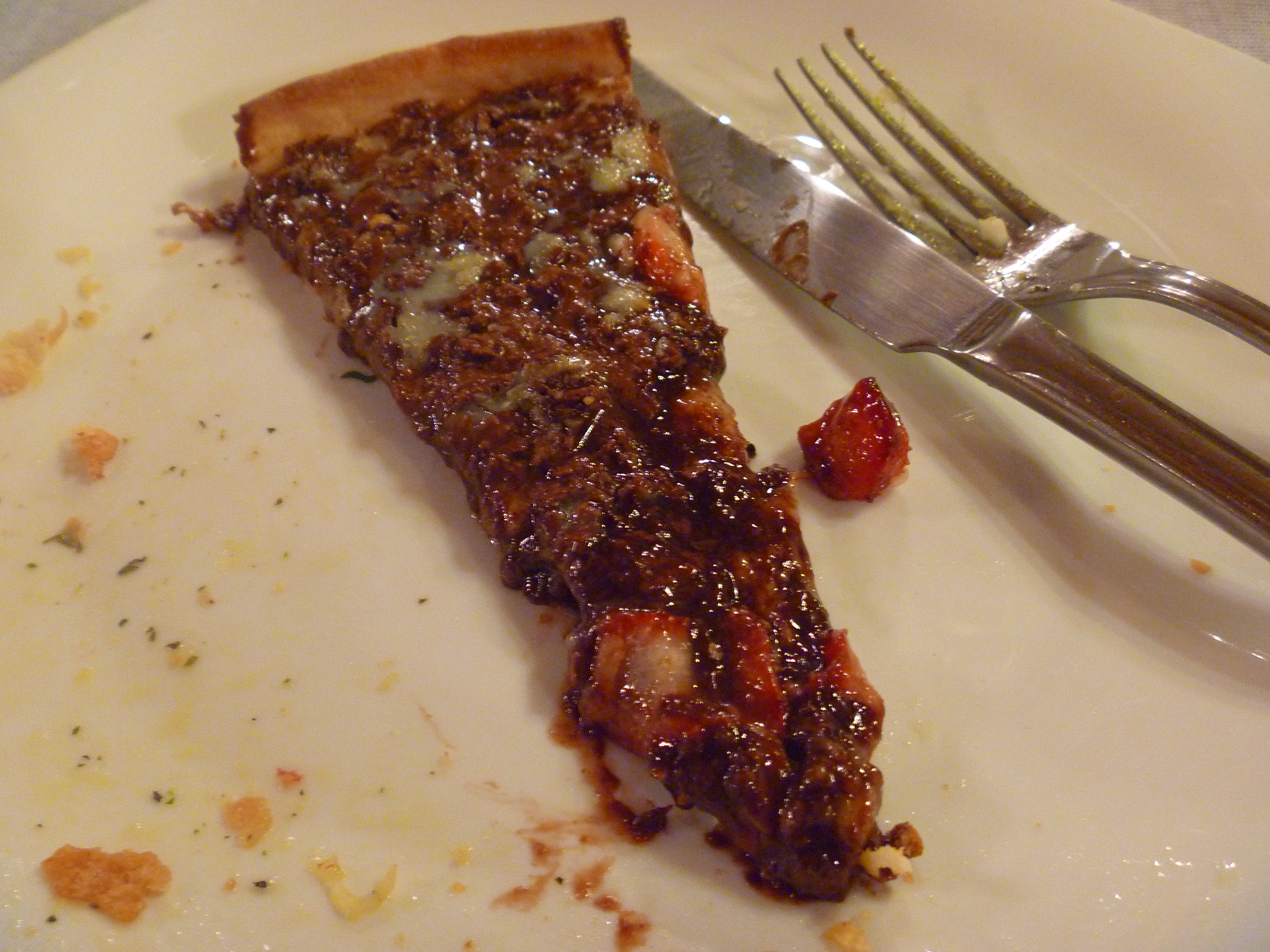
A slice of chocolate pizza in Brazil

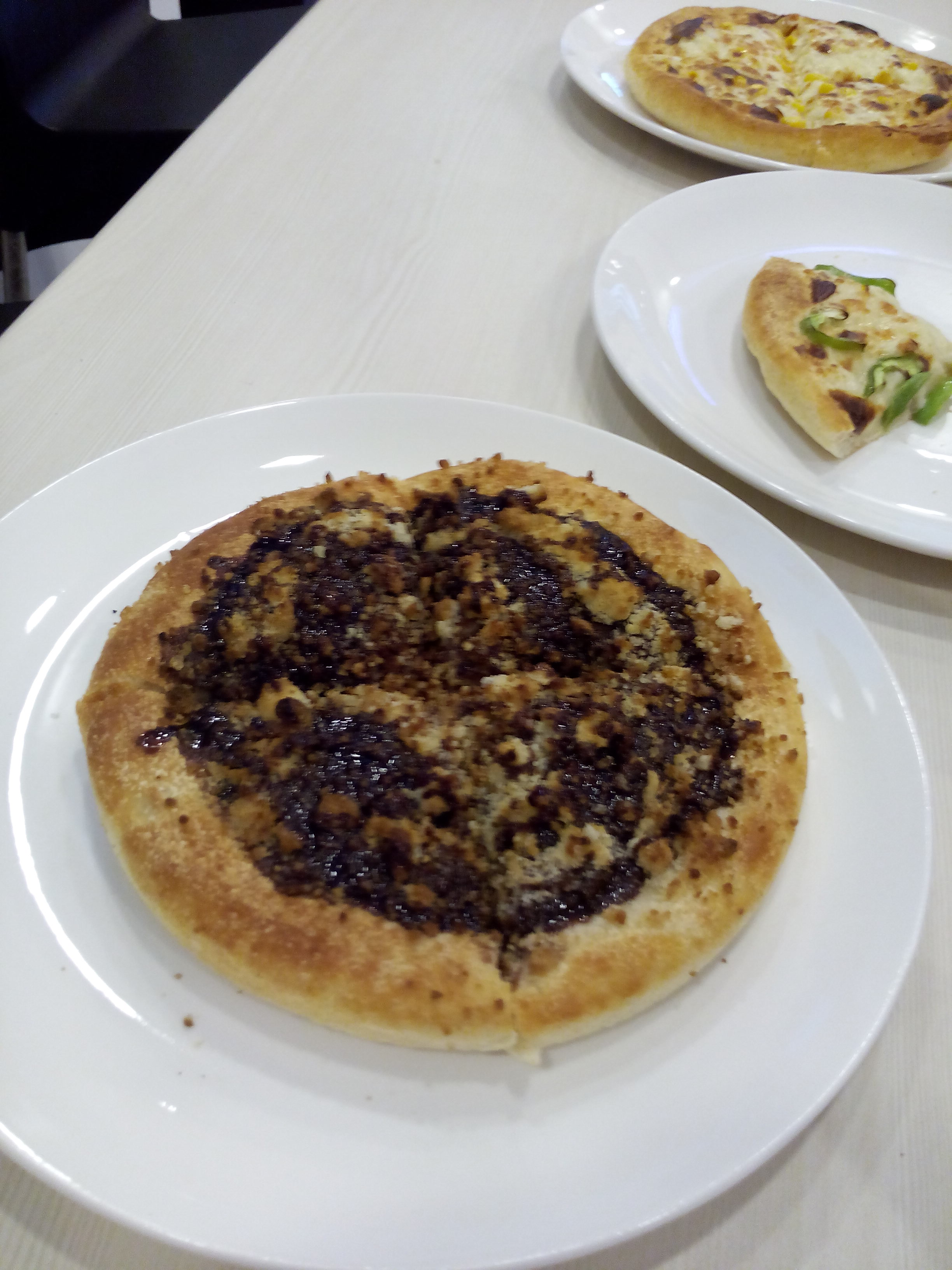
A personal-sized chocolate pizza

Chocolate pizza is a type of pizza prepared using chocolate as a primary ingredient. Various styles and preparation techniques exist. Chocolate pizza may be prepared as a dessert dish and as a savory dish. Some companies specialize in chocolate pizzas.

== Preparation ==
Some chocolate pizzas incorporate chocolate into the pizza dough. Chocolate pizza may be served as a sweet, dessert-style dish, or as a savory dish that includes chocolate. Chocolate pizza may be prepared using cooking chocolate as a spread before baking in the oven. Another variety is the use of a hazelnut spread after the pizza is baked. Chocolate pizza preparations have included icing sugar, banana, strawberries, marshmallows, sprinkles, Smarties, white chocolate chips and even ice cream.

== History ==
Chocolate pizza combines chocolate and pizza, two popular ingredients among school-aged children. The confluence of pizza and chocolate developed in parallel in several Western countries and has become a dessert purveyed in franchise and chain restaurants.

Chocolate pizza is also known as a Valentine's Day, Easter and Christmas holiday treat.

In Italy, pairing pizza with sweet flavors is very rare and considered "whimsical". Despite this norm, pizza bianca, stuffed with Nutella is sometimes eaten.

== Companies ==
Chocolate Pizza Company in the United States specializes in chocolate pizza. The company's headquarters is in Marcellus, New York. The Gourmet Chocolate Pizza Company in Cotgrave, Nottinghamshire, England, purveys chocolate pizza prepared with Belgian chocolate. These are dessert chocolate pizzas that are cold, with the chocolate shaped as a pizza. The Papa Murphy's take-and-bake pizza company purveys a S'mores Dessert Pizza, which is prepared with chocolate chips, marshmallows and a topping.

== See also ==
- Pizookie
- Sweet pizza in Brazil
