= Tomato pie =

Tomato pie may refer to a pie with tomatoes, such as:

- Southern tomato pie, a type of savory pie from the Southern United States
- Green tomato pie, a sweet pie made with green tomatoes

It may also refer to some types of pizza in the United States, such as:

- Sicilian pizza, a type of pizza that originated in Sicily
- New Haven-style pizza, specifically the "plain" kind with dough, sauce and minimal cheese
- Italian tomato pie, made of thick dough with tomato sauce on top
- Trenton tomato pie, a pizza in which tomato sauce is added after cheese and toppings

== See also ==
- List of tomato dishes
- List of pies
