= Robbinsville =

Robbinsville may refer to:

- Robbinsville, North Carolina
  - Robbinsville High School (North Carolina)
- Robbinsville Township, New Jersey
  - Robbinsville CDP, New Jersey
  - Trenton-Robbinsville Airport
  - Robbinsville High School (New Jersey)
- Four Thieves Gone: The Robbinsville Sessions, album by The Avett Brothers
