= Robbinsville, New Jersey (disambiguation) =

Robbinsville, New Jersey or Robinsville, New Jersey may refer to:

- Robbinsville Township, New Jersey, a township in Mercer County
  - Robbinsville Center, New Jersey, a census-designated place within Robbinsville Township
- Robinsville, New Jersey, an unincorporated community in Monmouth County
