= Windsor, New Jersey =

Populated place in Mercer County, New Jersey, US

- Census-designated place
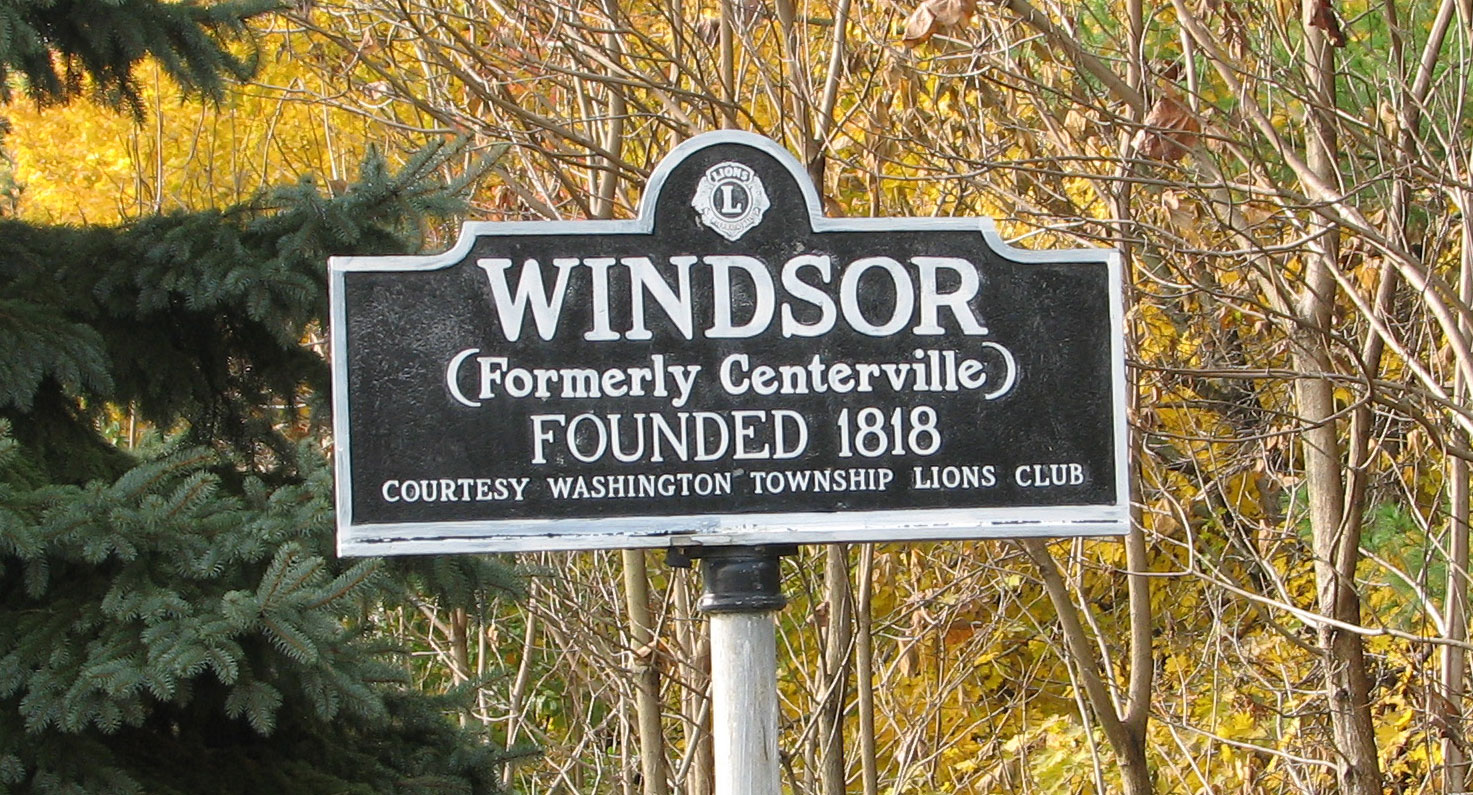
- Sign posted at the corner of Main and Church Streets in Windsor

- Location in Mercer County Location in New Jersey Location in the United States
- Coordinates: 40°14′32″N 74°34′53″W
- Country: United States
- State: New Jersey
- County: Mercer
- Township: Robbinsville
- Established: 1818

Area
  - Total: 1.15 sq mi (2.99 km^{2})
  - Land: 1.15 sq mi (2.97 km^{2})
  - Water: 0.0039 sq mi (0.01 km^{2})
- Elevation: 102 ft (31 m)

Population (2020)
  - Total: 330
  - Density: 287/sq mi (111/km^{2})
- ZIP Code: 08561
- FIPS code: 34-81620
- GNIS feature ID: 0881881

- Windsor Historic District
- U.S. National Register of Historic Places
- U.S. Historic district
- Location: Robbinsville Township, Mercer County, in the U.S. state of New Jersey
- NRHP reference No.: 88001710
- Added to NRHP: April 10, 1992

Historical population
| Census | Pop. | Note | %± |
|---|---|---|---|
| 2010 | 226 | | — |
| 2020 | 330 | | 46.0% |
2010 2020

Windsor is a small historic unincorporated community and census-designated place (CDP) located within Robbinsville Township (known as Washington Township until 2007) in Mercer County, in the U.S. state of New Jersey. The area is served as United States Postal Service ZIP Code 08561. As of the 2020 United States census, the CDP's population was 330, an increase of 104 (+46.0%) above the 226 counted at the 2010 census. The community, covering 570 acres (230 ha), was added to the National Register of Historic Places in 1992.

== History ==
Earliest mention of the local area in the 17th century refers to it as a wilderness with several Native American camps. Founded in 1818, it was named Centerville because it was the geographical center of the state. Until then, adjacent heavily wooded lands were called Magrilla (origins unknown).

In 1814, after the completion of the Bordentown and South Amboy stagecoach turnpike, William McKnight, director of the turnpike company, built a tavern at the intersection of the turnpike and present-day Windsor-Perrineville Road. A major thruway between New York City and Philadelphia, the turnpike was an improved route versus the Old York Road, originally the Tuckaraming Trail, a Native-American path prior to European settlement. In 1816 the local section of the stagecoach turnpike between New York and Philadelphia ran along Main Street. In late 1831, the Camden and Amboy Railroad was constructed through Centerville. The village became a stopover for rail travelers, and a thriving center for the bountiful farms and mills which serviced the growing population. It quickly became the largest village between Yardville (Sand Town) and Hightstown, and was renamed "Windsor" in 1846 to avoid any confusion with a Centerville post office in Hunterdon County.

Windsor was located within its namesake, Windsor Township, until 1797, at which point Windsor Township was divided into East Windsor and West Windsor townships, with the community of Windsor located in East Windsor. East Windsor was subsequently divided in 1860, with the southern portion including Windsor becoming Washington Township (present-day Robbinsville Township).

== Demographics ==
Windsor first appeared as a census designated place in the 2020 U.S. census.

Windsor CDP, New Jersey – Racial and ethnic composition Note: the US Census treats Hispanic/Latino as an ethnic category. This table excludes Latinos from the racial categories and assigns them to a separate category. Hispanics/Latinos may be of any race.
| Race / Ethnicity (NH = Non-Hispanic) | Pop 2020 | 2020 |
|---|---|---|
| White alone (NH) | 161 | 48.79% |
| Black or African American alone (NH) | 8 | 2.42% |
| Native American or Alaska Native alone (NH) | 0 | 0.00% |
| Asian alone (NH) | 128 | 38.79% |
| Native Hawaiian or Pacific Islander alone (NH) | 0 | 0.00% |
| Other race alone (NH) | 7 | 2.12% |
| Mixed race or Multiracial (NH) | 10 | 3.03% |
| Hispanic or Latino (any race) | 16 | 4.85% |
| Total | 330 | 100.00% |

Prior to 2020, the community was defined using the Zip Code Tabulation Area (ZCTA5 08561).

== Education ==
The school district covering the CDP is Robbinsville Township School District.

== Notable residents ==
People who were born in, residents of, or otherwise closely associated with Windsor include:

- Elijah C. Hutchinson (1855–1932), represented New Jersey's 4th congressional district from 1915–1923.
- Edmund Yard Robbins (1867–1942), philologist, who was a professor of Greek language and literature at Princeton University
