= Tomato pizza =

Tomato pizza may refer to:

- Any pizza topped with tomatoes
- Italian tomato pie, a thick-crusted baked good

== See also ==
- List of tomato dishes
