= Frank Eliason =

American corporate executive and author

- Born: Frank Eliason; November 9, 1972 (age 53); Philadelphia, Pennsylvania
- Education: Bucks County Community College
- Occupations: Executive vice president, U.S. Digital & Customer Experience for Zeno Group
- Board member of: Council of Better Business Bureaus; Society of Consumer Affairs Professionals
- Website: frankeliason.com

Frank Eliason (born November 9, 1972) is an American corporate executive and author. Referred to as "the most famous customer service manager in the US, possibly the world" by BusinessWeek, Eliason is best known for developing the use of social media in the practice of customer relations.

== Career ==
After a brief career in retail, Eliason worked for Vanguard Investments and the now-defunct Advanta Bank. He joined Comcast as executive support manager in 2007 during a period of high-profile public relations issues, including an incident in which 76-year-old Comcast customer Monica Shaw destroyed equipment in a Comcast office with a hammer after becoming frustrated by the service she received. Additionally, Bob Garfield, the host of NPR's On the Media and a columnist for Advertising Age, launched the website ComcastMustDie.com, which attacked the company's customer service. In 2008, Eliason, as part of the team selected to address the issues, created the Twitter account @ComcastCares and began directly responding to customer complaints, which positively impacted the public perception of Comcast. Eliason, who interacted with more than 10,000 Comcast customers via Twitter, was the subject of significant press attention; he was featured in The Wall Street Journal, ABC News, Wired, The Washington Post, BusinessWeek, Forbes and The Philadelphia Inquirer, among other publications, and became known as "Famous Frank" inside Comcast.

In July 2010, Eliason left Comcast to become global director of social media at Citi. At Citi, Eliason was recognized by trade magazine Bank Technology News as one of the Innovators of the Year (2011 and 2012), and in 2013 he was named by the Holmes Report as one of the 25 top innovators in the public relations industry.

Eliason was named executive vice president, US digital and customer experience for Zeno Group in October 2015.

He serves on the board of directors for the Council of Better Business Bureaus and the Society of Consumer Affairs Professionals.

== Personal life ==
Eliason, who grew up in Southampton, Pennsylvania, lives in Robbinsville Township, New Jersey. He and his wife Carolyn have three daughters: Robyn; Lily; and Gianna Rose, who died in 2004.

== Bibliography ==
- At Your Service: How to Attract New Customers, Increase Sales, and Grow Your Business Using Simple Customer Service Technique; April, 2012; Wiley; ISBN 978-1118217221; 216pp.
