= Mercer County Technical Schools =

School district in Mercer County, New Jersey, US

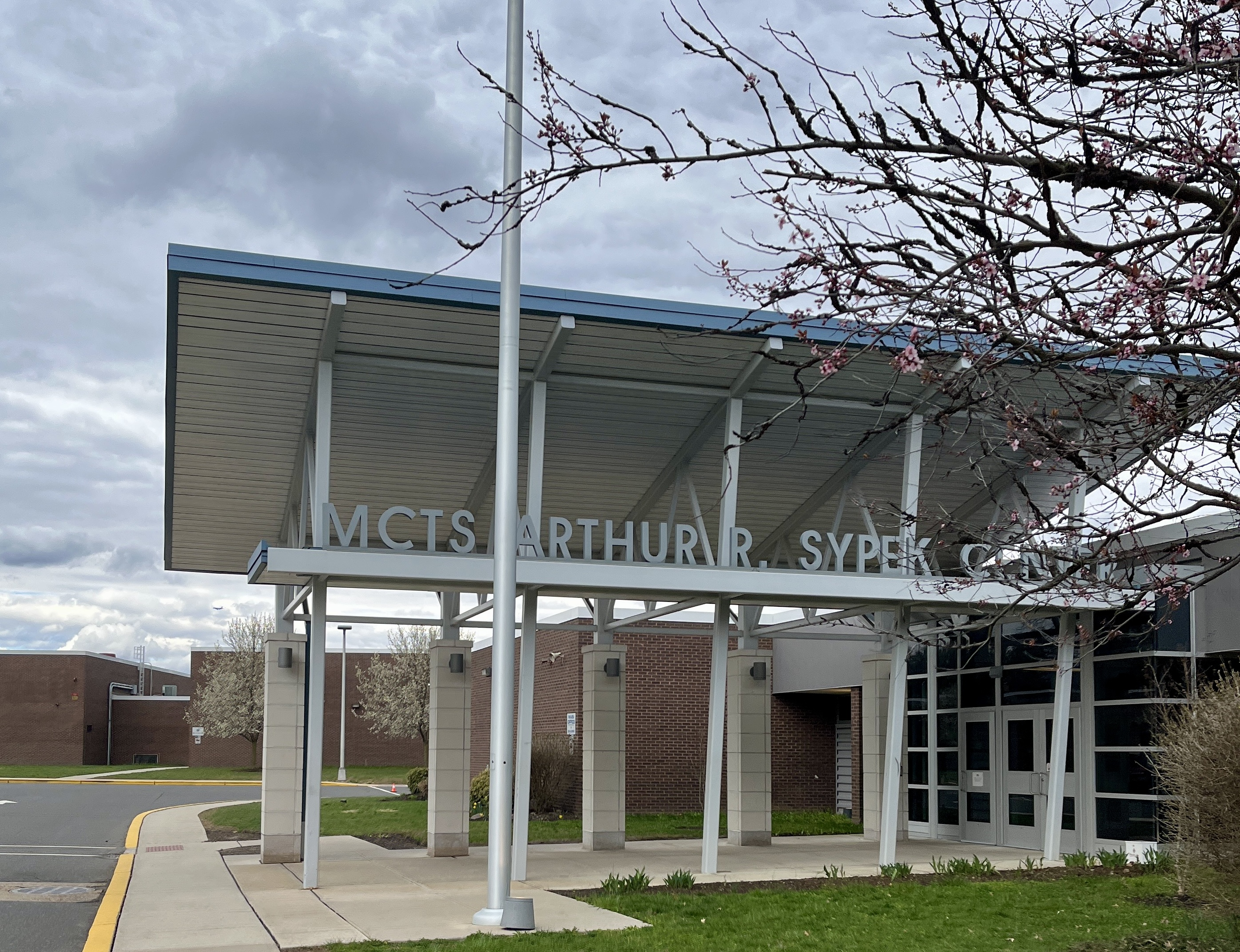
- Arthur R. Sypek Center in Pennington

Address
- 1085 Old Trenton Road West Windsor, Mercer County, New Jersey, 08690
- Coordinates: 40.24910°N 74.65420°W

District information
- Motto: Magic Happens Here
- Grades: 9-12 (Academy); 11-12 (Shared-Time)
- Superintendent: Matthew C. Carey
- Business administrator: Anisah Coppin
- Accreditation: Middle States Association of Colleges and Schools
- Schools: 2
- Budget: $18,428,000 (2023-24)
- NCES District ID: 3409950

Students and staff
- Enrollment: 356 full-time 108 shared time (as of 2023-24)
- Faculty: 44.5 FTEs
- Student–teacher ratio: 8:1
- District mascot: Wizard
- Colors: Blue; Green; Yellow

Other information
- Website: www.mcts.edu

Mercer County Technical Schools (MCTS), also known as the Area Vocational Technical Schools of Mercer County, is a public technical school district serving Mercer County, New Jersey. Its two campuses are located in West Windsor and Pennington. The district offers standard shared time technical programs for grades 11 and 12 and full-time academies for grades 9 through 12, as well as adult education programs.

== Schools ==
The district's academies and programs are split between two campuses, both located within Mercer County.

=== Assunpink Center ===
The Assunpink Center is located at 1085 Old Trenton Road in West Windsor, New Jersey.

==== Health Science Academy ====
The Assunpink campus has one full-time Academy, the Health Science Academy, which has a curriculum focused on health.

==== Shared time programs ====
As of 2024, there are seven shared-time programs at the Assunpink campus:

- Carpentry
- Diesel technology
- Electrician
- Computer game programming
- Heating, ventilation, air conditioning and refrigeration (HVAC-R) technology
- Pre-nursing
- Welding technology

=== Arthur R. Sypek Center ===
The Arthur R. Sypek Center is located at 129 Bull Run Road in Pennington, New Jersey.

==== Full-time academies ====
The Sypek campus has two full-time academies, the STEM Academy and the Culinary Arts Academy. The STEM Academy provides students with an education in science, technology, engineering, and mathematics, while the Culinary Arts Academy focuses on culinary education.

In 2024, NJ.com ranked the STEM Academy as the top high school in Mercer County based on data released by the New Jersey Department of Education. The school ranked 42nd in the state according to the same data.

==== Shared time programs ====
As of 2024, there are seven shared-time programs at the Sypek campus:

- Automotive mechanics technology
- Autobody collision and repair technology
- Criminalistics
- Cosmetology
- Culinary arts
- Graphic design
- Horticulture and turf care management

== Enrollment ==
Student body composition as of 2023
Race and ethnicity	Total
Hispanic	41.7%
White	26.6%
Black	21.9%
Asian	7.8%
Two or more Races	1.6%
American Indian/Alaska Native	0.3%
Native Hawaiian/Pacific Islander	0.1%
Sex	Total
Male	53%
Female	47%
Income	Total
Low-income (Note: The percentage of students who are eligible to participate in the Free Lunch and Reduced-Price Lunch Programs under the National School Lunch Act.)	35.7%

=== Admissions ===
The admissions process for the district is somewhat selective and competitive. The selection process aims to identify applicants who will benefit most from the educational opportunities provided. Admission criteria used include academic transcripts, attendance records, standardized test scores, and disciplinary records, in addition to an admissions test administered by the district.

Only eighth grade students can apply to one of the three full-time academies, and, if accepted, begin during their ninth grade year at the school. Transfer into the full-time academy programs after this period is not permitted as the academies have full curriculums from grades 9-12.

Rising eleventh grade students can apply for shared-time programs at the school, as they serve students in grades 11-12.

==== Sending school districts ====
The following public school districts within Mercer County serve as sending districts:

- East Windsor Regional School District
- Ewing Public Schools
- Hamilton Township School District
- Hopewell Valley Regional School District
- Lawrence Township School District
- Princeton Public Schools
- Robbinsville Public School District
- Trenton Public Schools
- West Windsor-Plainsboro Regional School District

== Administration ==
Core members of the district's administration are (as of 2024):

- Matthew C. Carey, Superintendent
- Dr. Charles Powell, Assistant Superintendent of Curriculum & Instruction
- Anisah Coppin, School Business Administrator / Board Secretary
- Nisha Goyal, Assistant School Business Administrator
- Dr. Phillip Crisostomo, Principal, Assunpink Center
- Jared Warren, Principal, Sypek Center
- Alan Munford, Director, Post-Secondary Services
- Ryan Haimer, Director, Special Services
- Michael Orfe, Director, Pupil Services

== Board of education ==
The district's board of education sets policy and oversee the fiscal and educational operation of the district through its administration. The board is composed of seven members: the county superintendent of schools, who serves on an ex officio basis, and six members who are appointed by the Mercer County Executive. Members appointed by the executive serve three-year terms of office on a staggered basis with the approval of the Mercer County Board of County Commissioners. The board appoints a superintendent to oversee the district's day-to-day operations and a business administrator to supervise the business functions of the district.
