= Caedan Wallace =

American football player (born 2000)

No. 77 – Miami Dolphins
- Position: Guard
- Roster status: Active

Personal information
- Born: April 18, 2000 (age 26); Robbinsville Township, New Jersey, U.S.
- Listed height: 6 ft 5 in (1.96 m)
- Listed weight: 314 lb (142 kg)

Career information
- High school: Robbinsville (NJ); Hun School (NJ)
- College: Penn State (2019–2023)
- NFL draft: 2024: 3rd round, 68th overall pick

Career history
- New England Patriots (2024–2025); Miami Dolphins (2026–present)

Career NFL statistics as of Week 17, 2025
- Games played: 10
- Games started: 2
- Stats at Pro Football Reference

Caedan Anson Wallace (born April 18, 2000) is an American professional football guard for the Miami Dolphins of the National Football League (NFL). He played college football for the Penn State Nittany Lions and was selected by the New England Patriots in the third round of the 2024 NFL draft.

== Early life ==
Wallace grew up in Robbinsville Township, New Jersey. He attended Robbinsville High School for two years before transferring to the Hun School of Princeton. He was team captain in his last two years and was a three-time All-Mid-Atlantic Prep League (MAPL) selection, also being chosen to USA Today's All-USA New Jersey first-team in 2018 and to the New Jersey Sportszone All-Offense team. He participated at the All-American Bowl and Polynesian Bowl. A four-star recruit, Wallace committed to play college football for the Penn State Nittany Lions.

== College career ==
Wallace redshirted as a true freshman at Penn State in 2019 and appeared in four games. He started seven games in the 2020 season and then started all 13 games in 2021. He entered the 2022 season as a starter but was injured seven games in. He returned for a final season in 2023. In his final year, Wallace was named honorable mention All-Big Ten Conference while starting all 13 games, allowing only a single sack. He declared for the 2024 NFL draft and ended his collegiate career with 40 starts, all at right tackle. He was invited to the East–West Shrine Bowl and the NFL Scouting Combine.

== Professional career ==
Pre-draft measurables
Height	Weight	Arm length	Hand span	Wingspan	40-yard dash	10-yard split	20-yard split	20-yard shuttle	Three-cone drill	Vertical jump	Broad jump
6 ft 4 7/8 in (1.95 m)	314 lb (142 kg)	34 in (0.86 m)	10 3/4 in (0.27 m)	6 ft 10 5/8 in (2.10 m)	5.15 s	1.74 s	2.98 s	4.78 s	7.73 s	31.0 in (0.79 m)	9 ft 8 in (2.95 m)
All values from NFL Combine/Pro Day

=== New England Patriots ===
Wallace was selected in the third round (68th overall) of the 2024 NFL draft by the New England Patriots. He signed his rookie deal on May 31, 2024.

Wallace made his first career NFL start in Week 3 against the New York Jets, playing left tackle in place of the injured Vederian Lowe. On October 4, Patriots head coach Jerod Mayo announced that Wallace would be placed on injured reserve. He was activated on December 27. As a rookie, Wallace appeared in six games and started in two of them.

In the 2025 season, Wallace appeared in four games.

=== Miami Dolphins ===
On August 10, 2026, the Patriots traded Wallace and a 2029 seventh-round draft pick to the Miami Dolphins in exchange for a 2028 sixth-round draft pick.
