= Papa's Tomato Pies =

Historic pizzeria

Coordinates: 40.21609°N 74.62379°W

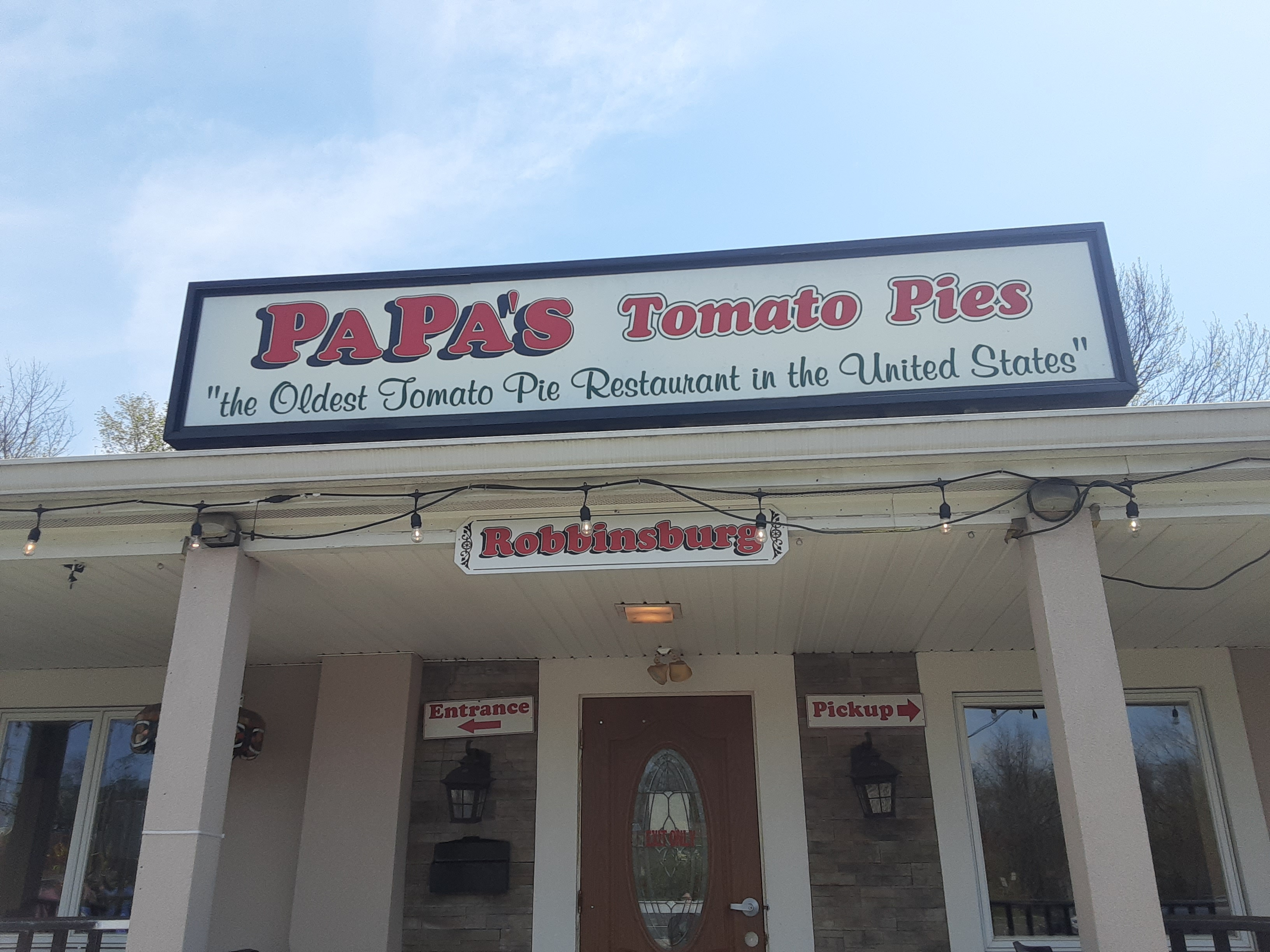
- Sign at current location
- Interactive map of Papa's Tomato Pies

Restaurant information
- Established: 1912
- Owner: Nick Azzaro
- Previous owner: Giuseppe "Joe" Papa
- Head chef: Nick Azzaro
- Food type: Italian
- Location: 19 Robbinsville-Allentown Road, Robbinsville, New Jersey, 08691, United States
- Website: www.papastomatopies.com

Papa's Tomato Pies is a historic pizzeria in Robbinsville, New Jersey. Founded by Giuseppe "Joe" Papa in 1912 on South Clinton Avenue in Trenton, the restaurant specializes in selling Trenton tomato pies. Papa's is the oldest family owned and longest continuously operating pizzeria in the United States, as well as the second oldest pizzeria in the United States after Lombardi's Pizza (Lombardi's closed for a decade from 1984 to 1994 and was reopened under new management).

== History ==
Papa's Tomato Pies was established by Giuseppe "Joe" Papa in 1912 on South Clinton Avenue in Trenton, New Jersey. Before opening his own restaurant, Papa learned the trade from Joe's Tomato Pies, which opened in 1910, and closed in the late 1980s.

A few years after opening, it moved to Butler Street and in 1945, the restaurant moved to 804 Chambers Street where it would remain until 2013.

During the 1950s and 1960s Papa's would remain open until 3 am serving late workers and patrons who just left local bars. Joe Papa's daughter, Teresa "Tessie" Papa, and her husband Dominik "Abie" Azzaro, eventually took over operations in the 1960s.

In 2013, Papa's moved to Robbinsville-Allentown Road in Robbinsville, New Jersey. Papa's is currently operated by Joe Papa's grandson, Nick Azzaro, a third generation Italian-American. Azzaro has been making pizza for over fifty years and has worked for Papa's since he was 14.

Papa's is also known for its signature mustard pie, which features a thin layer of spicy brown mustard under the cheese and sauce.

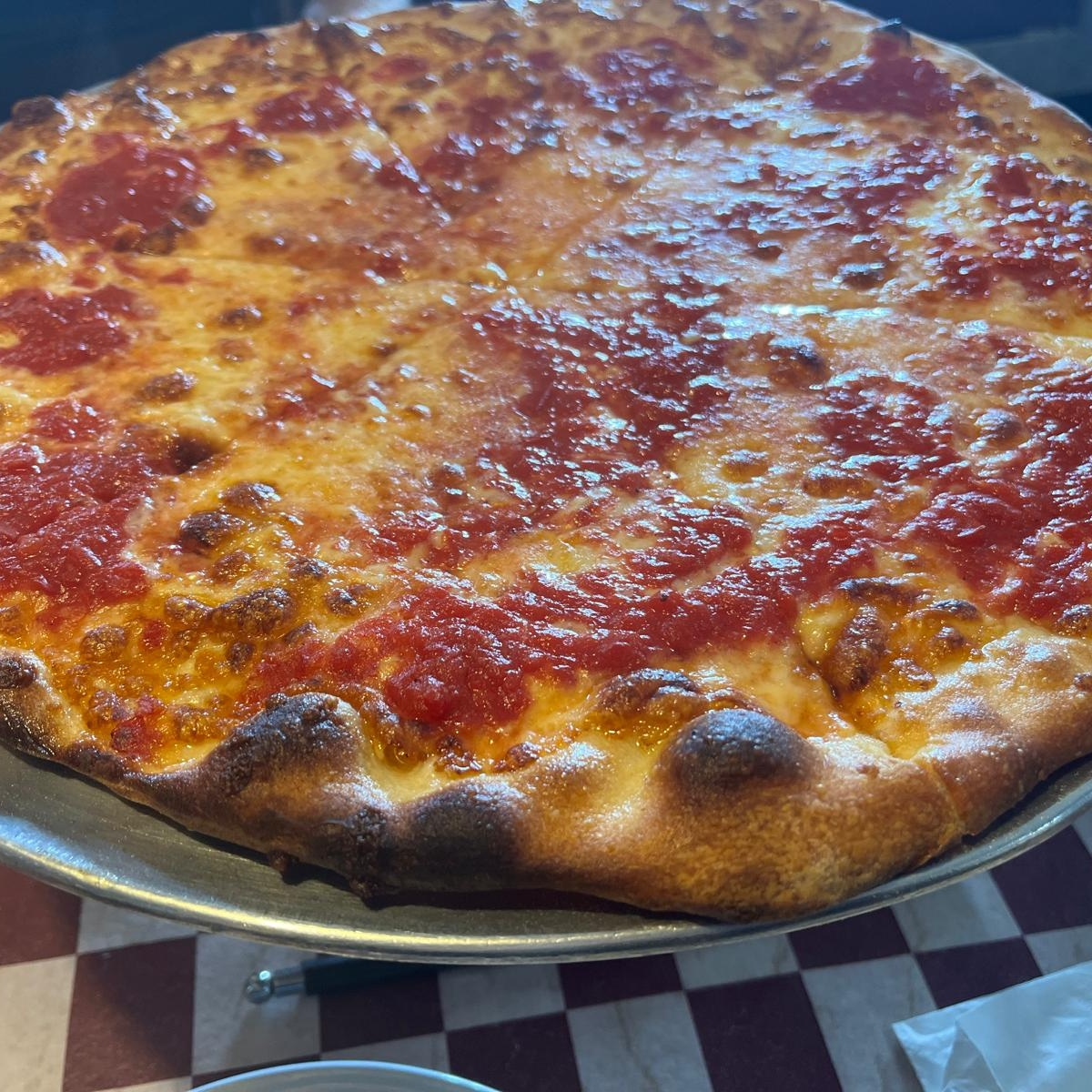
One of Papa's tomato pies

== Reception and accolades ==
In 2010, Papa's won the Munchmobile Pizza Patrol awards for the six best pizzas in New Jersey, winning the Award of Excellence.

In 2012, Papa's was ranked one of the 35 Best Pizzas in America.

== See also ==
- De Lorenzo's Tomato Pies
- Antica Pizzeria Port'Alba, oldest pizzeria in the world
