= De Lorenzo's Tomato Pies =

Coordinates: 40.21107°N 74.74982°W

- Interactive map of De Lorenzo's Tomato Pies

Restaurant information
- Established: 1947
- Food type: Italian
- Location: 2350 Route 33 #105, Robbinsville, New Jersey, 08691; 08629; 08611, United States
- Other locations: 530 Hudson St., Trenton, NJ*(closed); 1707 Yardley Langhorne Rd., Yardley, PA 19067
- Website: www.delorenzostomatopies.com

De Lorenzo's Tomato Pies is a pizzeria that sells Trenton tomato pies in Robbinsville, New Jersey. It was founded in 1936 by Alexander "Chick" De Lorenzo and officially established in 1947 in Trenton, New Jersey. Since then it expanded to another location in Robbinsville in late 2007 and closed its original location in Trenton. It is the third oldest pizzeria in New Jersey that sells tomato pies after Papa's Tomato Pies and Joe's Tomato Pies.

== History ==
Alexander "Chick" De Lorenzo established De Lorenzo's Tomato Pies in 1947. Zagat Survey reviews give it high marks for quality and taste, it is a top pick on review site Roadfood.com, and is now considered a landmark in New Jersey. De Lorenzo's Tomato Pies opens at 4:00 pm and primarily serves dinner. De Lorenzo's is closed on Mondays. Tomato pies are the featured item on the menu, but De Lorenzo's also offers salads and seasonal specials. De Lorenzo's offers many toppings such as: basil, garlic, anchovies, artichokes, black olives, broccoli, cherry peppers, hot peppers, mushrooms, onions, roasted peppers, spinach, sweet peppers, sausage, pepperoni, clams, homemade meatballs, and italian tuna. Lines can grow to over 50 people before the restaurant opens. F. Scott and Zelda New Jersey Restaurant and Wine Critics described De Lorenzo's as a never disappointing meal. Sam Amico, Alexander's grandson, has taken over the company after the passing of Alexander. F. Scott and Zelda praises the new ownership as "a world class establishment".

The restaurant was frequented by Supreme Court Justice Samuel Alito in his student days. Alito considered De Lorenzo's a favorite restaurant. Other past patrons include Frank Sinatra, Luciano Pavarotti, and Joe DiMaggio.

New York Times food critic, Karla Cook, gave the restaurant a "Very Good", citing the excellent quality of the clam pie, canned whole baby clams, and the pepperoni and mushroom as a classic. She was, however, critical of the atmosphere citing that it was too crowded.

In December 2011, the restaurant's ownership announced the impending closing of its original Trenton 530 Hudson Street location on January 15, 2012, as reported on NJ.com.

In 2018, De Lorenzo's opened a second location in Yardley, Pennsylvania.
