= Italian tomato pie =

Pizza-like baked good of Italian-American origin

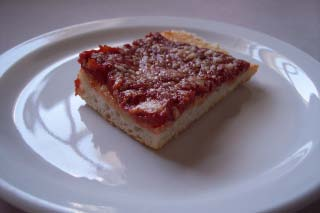
- Type: Pizza
- Region or state: Northeastern United States; Central Canada
- Main ingredients: Focaccia-like dough, tomato sauce

Italian tomato pie is an Italian-American and Italian-Canadian baked good consisting of a thick, porous, focaccia-like dough covered with tomato sauce. It may be sprinkled with Romano cheese or oregano. It is not usually served straight from the oven, but allowed to cool and then consumed at room temperature or reheated. Like Sicilian pizza, tomato pie is baked in a large rectangular pan and usually served in square slices, although in Rhode Island it is cut into rectangular strips like pizza al taglio. Tomato pie descends from and resembles the Italian sfincione, although it is not the same dish. For instance, sfincione may have toppings, is usually served hot, and has a crust more like brioche than focaccia.

A 1903 article in the New-York Tribune on the food of Italian-Americans described a "pomidore pizza", or tomato pie, made solely with dough, tomatoes, and powdered red pepper. The article also described a variant with a bologna topping called "salami pie" or bologna pie. Tomato pie has been sold by Iannelli's Bakery in Philadelphia since 1910. In Utica, New York, the family that would later found O'Scugnizzo's Pizzeria in 1914 sold tomato pies from their basement for several years prior, starting in 1910.

== Regional names ==
=== United States ===
- Philadelphia: tomato pie, church pie, gravy pie (as in "Italian gravy", i.e. tomato sauce)
- Rhode Island: bakery pizza, party pizza, pizza strips, red bread, strip pizza, red strips
- Utica: tomato pie

=== Canada ===
- Hamilton, Ontario: Roma pizza (after the name of a bakery), bread pizza, slab pizza
- Montreal: cold pizza, pizza bread, tomato pizza

== Gallery ==
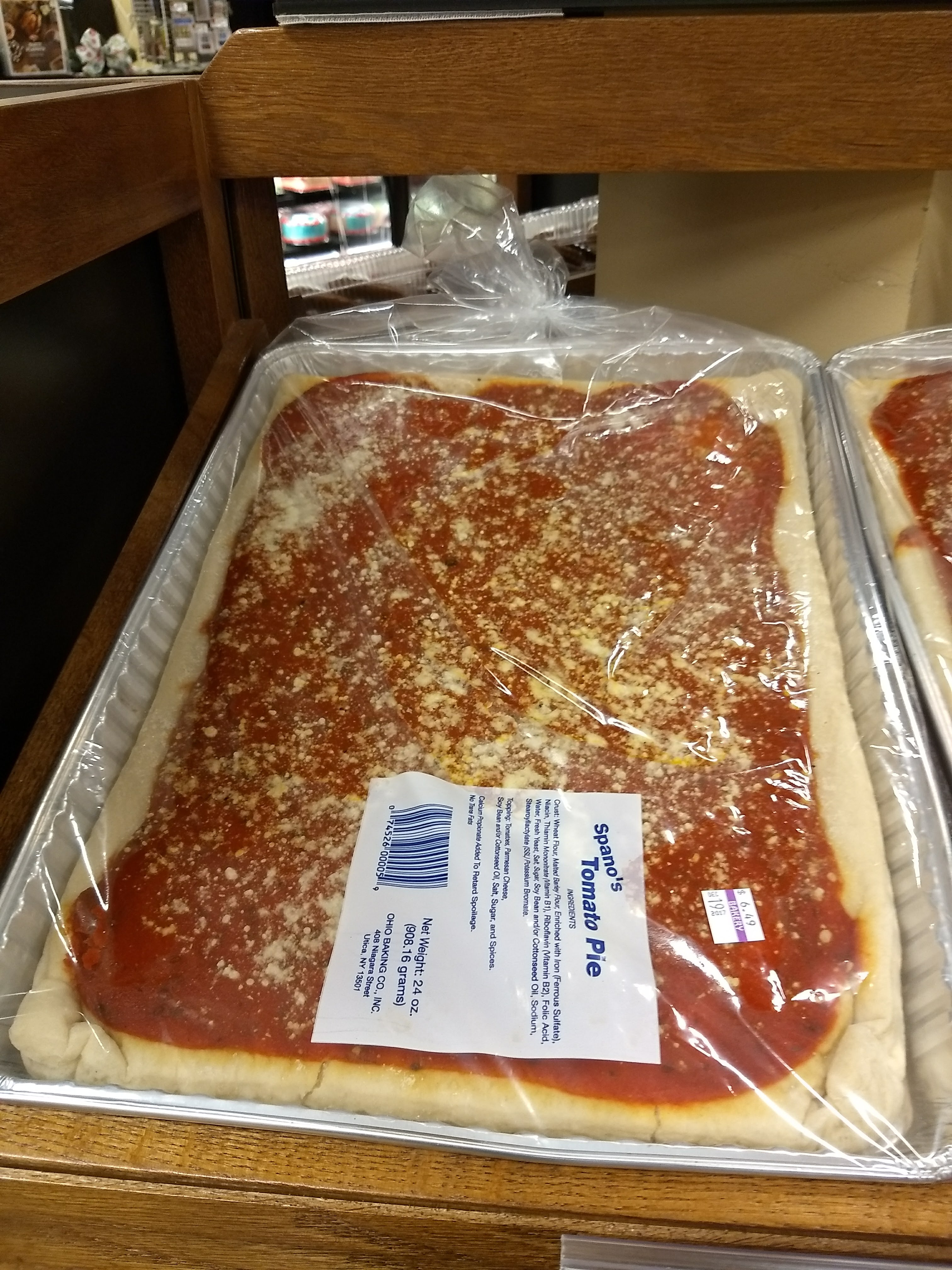
Italian tomato pie for sale in a grocery store near Utica, New York

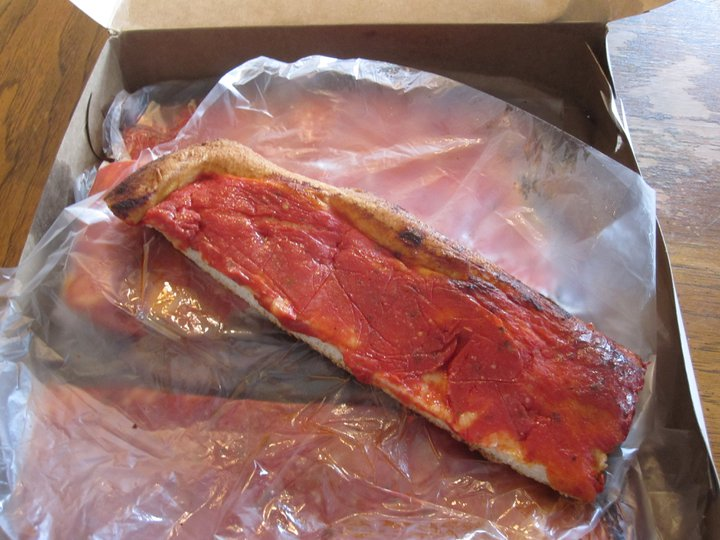
Rhode Island pizza strips

== See also ==
- List of tomato dishes
- Southern tomato pie
- Trenton tomato pie
