= Robbinsville Township, New Jersey =

Township in Mercer County, New Jersey, US

- Township
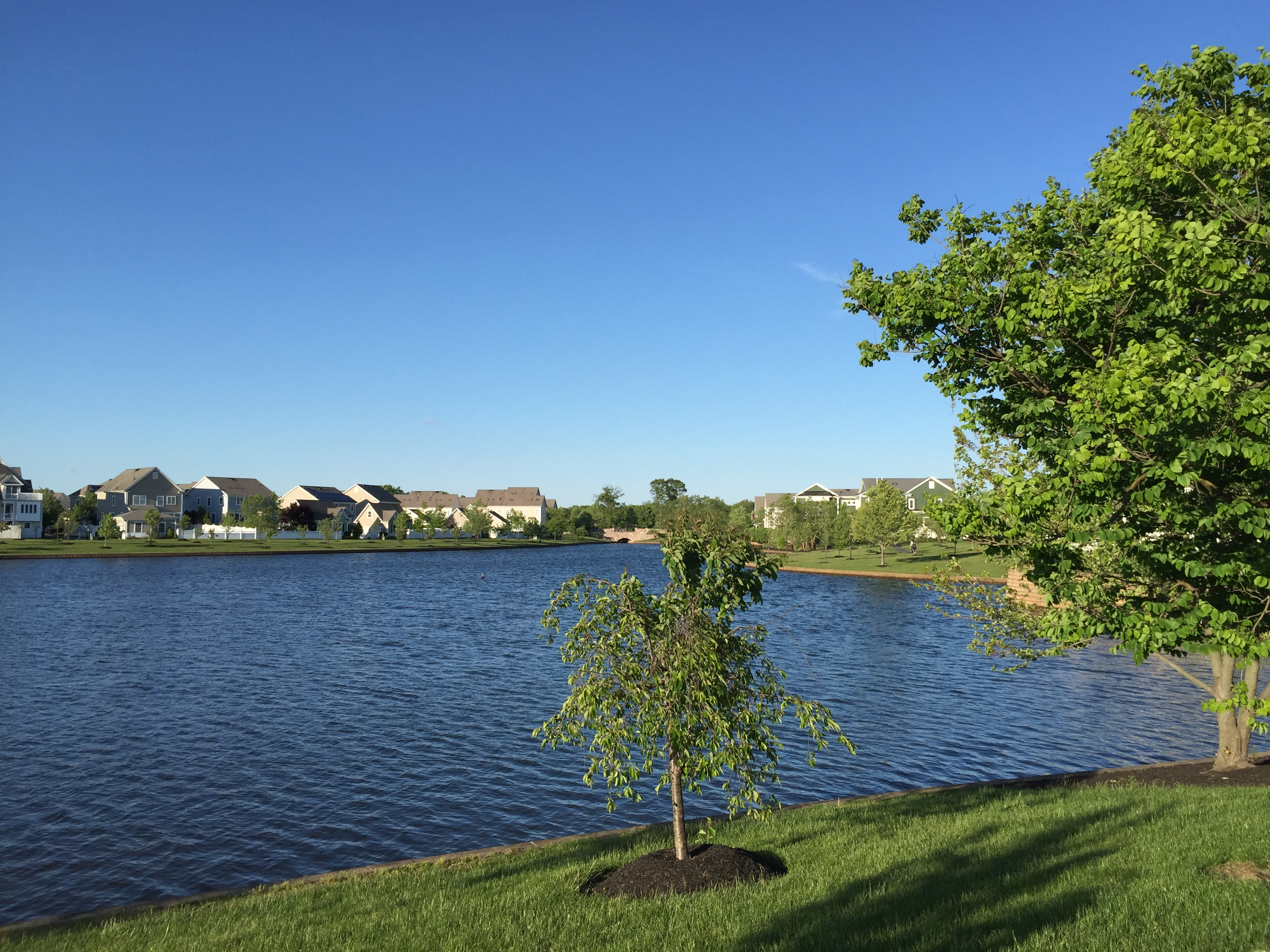
- Lakeside view of Robbinsville

- Logo of Robbinsville
- Motto: Be at the Center of it All
- Location of Robbinsville Township in Mercer County highlighted in red (right). Inset map: Location of Mercer County in New Jersey highlighted in orange (left).

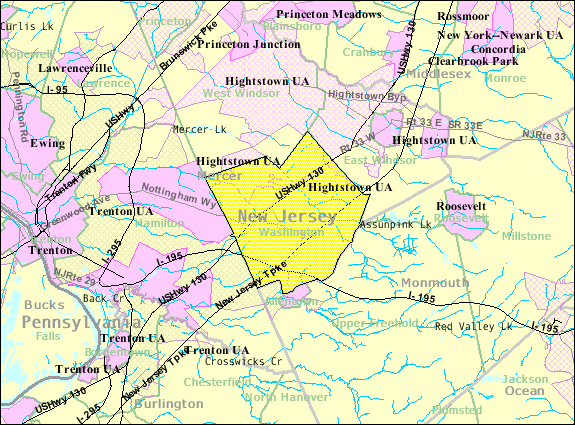
- Census Bureau map of Robbinsville Township, Mercer County, New Jersey
- Interactive map of Robbinsville Township, New Jersey
- Location in Mercer County Location in New Jersey Location in the United States
- Coordinates: 40°13′22″N 74°35′35″W
- Country: United States
- State: New Jersey
- County: Mercer
- Incorporated: March 15, 1859, as Washington Township
- Renamed: January 1, 2008, as Robbinsville Township
- Named for: George R. Robbins

Government
  - Type: Faulkner Act (mayor–council)
  - Body: Township Council
  - Mayor: Michael J. Todd
  - Administrator: Bruce R. Darvas
  - Municipal clerk: Michele Seigfried

Area
  - Total: 20.58 sq mi (53.30 km^{2})
  - Land: 20.44 sq mi (52.94 km^{2})
  - Water: 0.14 sq mi (0.36 km^{2}) 0.68%
  - Rank: 139th of 565 in state 5th of 12 in county
- Elevation: 121 ft (37 m)

Population (2020)
  - Total: 15,476
  - Estimate (2023): 15,361
  - Rank: 168th of 565 in state 9th of 12 in county
  - Density: 757.1/sq mi (292.3/km^{2})
  - Rank: 413th of 565 in state 11th of 12 in county
- Time zone: UTC−05:00 (Eastern (EST))
  - Summer (DST): UTC−04:00 (Eastern (EDT))
- ZIP Code: 08691
- Area code: 609
- FIPS code: 3402163850
- GNIS feature ID: 0882122
- Website: www.robbinsville-twp.org

Robbinsville Township is a township in Mercer County, in the U.S. state of New Jersey. It is located on the border of the New York metropolitan area and the Philadelphia metropolitan area. As of the 2020 United States census, the township's population was 15,476, its highest decennial count ever. Inspired by its central geographical location within New Jersey, Robbinsville's motto is Be at the Center of it All.

The township was incorporated as in 1859 as Washington Township. It changed its name to Robbinsville in 2008, the name of a settlement within the township, after the politician George R. Robbins.

Robbinsville has the only team to reach the Little League Softball World Series four times in seven years. It is home to the BAPS Swaminarayan Akshardham, one of the largest Hindu temples in the world.

== Geography ==
According to the United States Census Bureau, the township had a total area of 20.58 square miles (53.30 km^{2}), including 20.44 square miles (52.94 km^{2}) of land and 0.14 square miles (0.36 km^{2}) of water (0.68%).

Located at the cross-roads between the Delaware Valley region to the southwest and the Raritan Valley region to the northeast, the township is considered part of the New York Metropolitan area as defined by the United States Census Bureau, but borders the Philadelphia metropolitan area and is part of the Federal Communications Commission's Philadelphia Designated Market Area.

The township borders East Windsor, Hamilton Township, and West Windsor Township in Mercer County; and Allentown, Millstone Township and Upper Freehold Township in Monmouth County.

Unincorporated communities, localities and place names located partially or completely within the township include Allens Station, Carsons Mills, Hillside Terrace, Meadows Terrace, New Canton, New Sharon, Pages Corners, Robbinsville Center and Windsor.

== History ==
What is now Robbinsville Township was originally incorporated as Washington Township (named for George Washington) by an act of the New Jersey Legislature on March 15, 1859, from portions of East Windsor.

On November 6, 2007, voters approved by a vote of 1,816 to 693 a measure that changed the township's name from Washington Township (the name of five other municipalities in New Jersey) to Robbinsville, named after a settlement within the township. The official changeover took place January 1, 2008, as signs and other items with "Washington" on them began to be changed. It is named for George R. Robbins, who served in the United States House of Representatives from 1855 to 1859 and lived in the area.

== Demographics ==
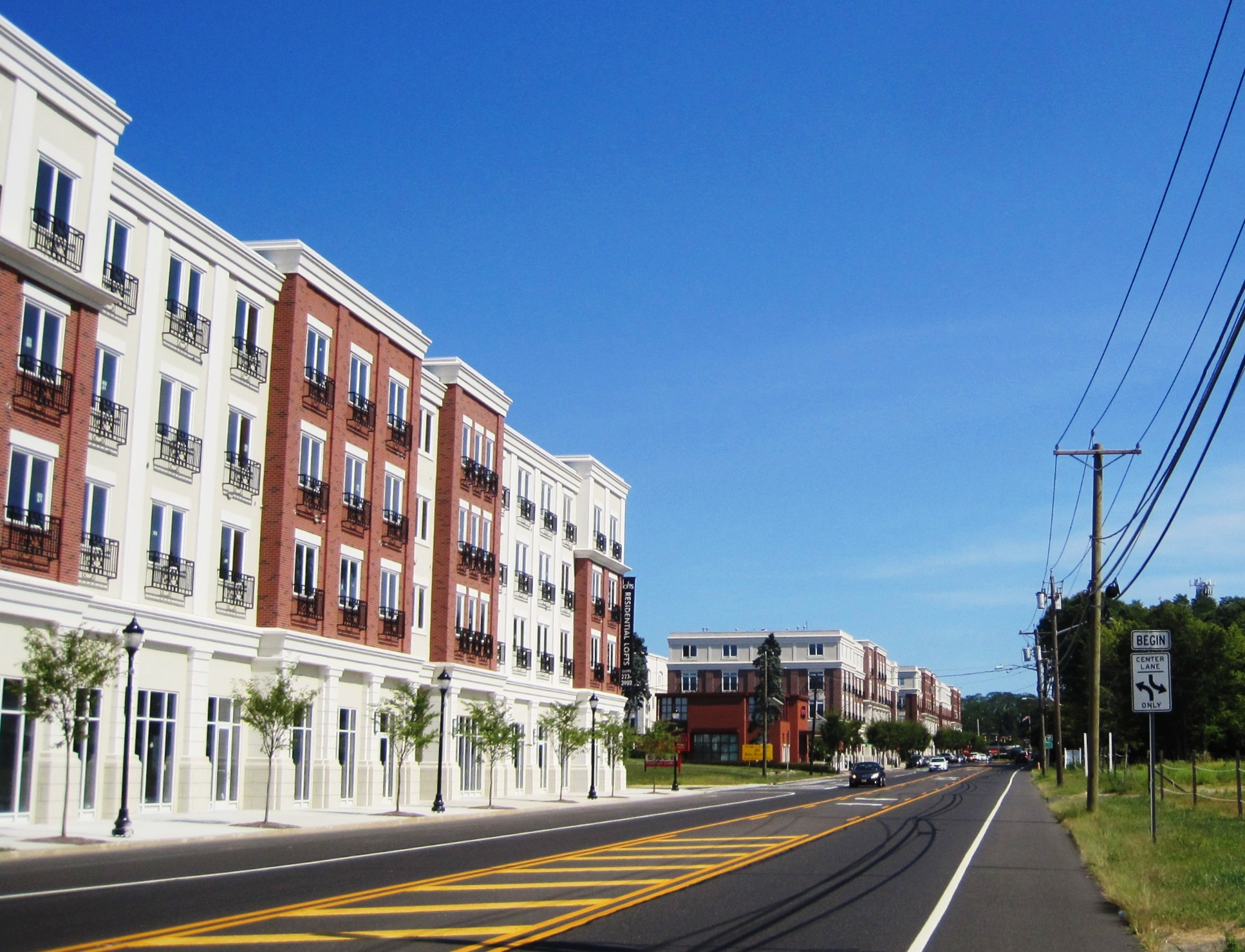
Robbinsville Town Center along Route 33.

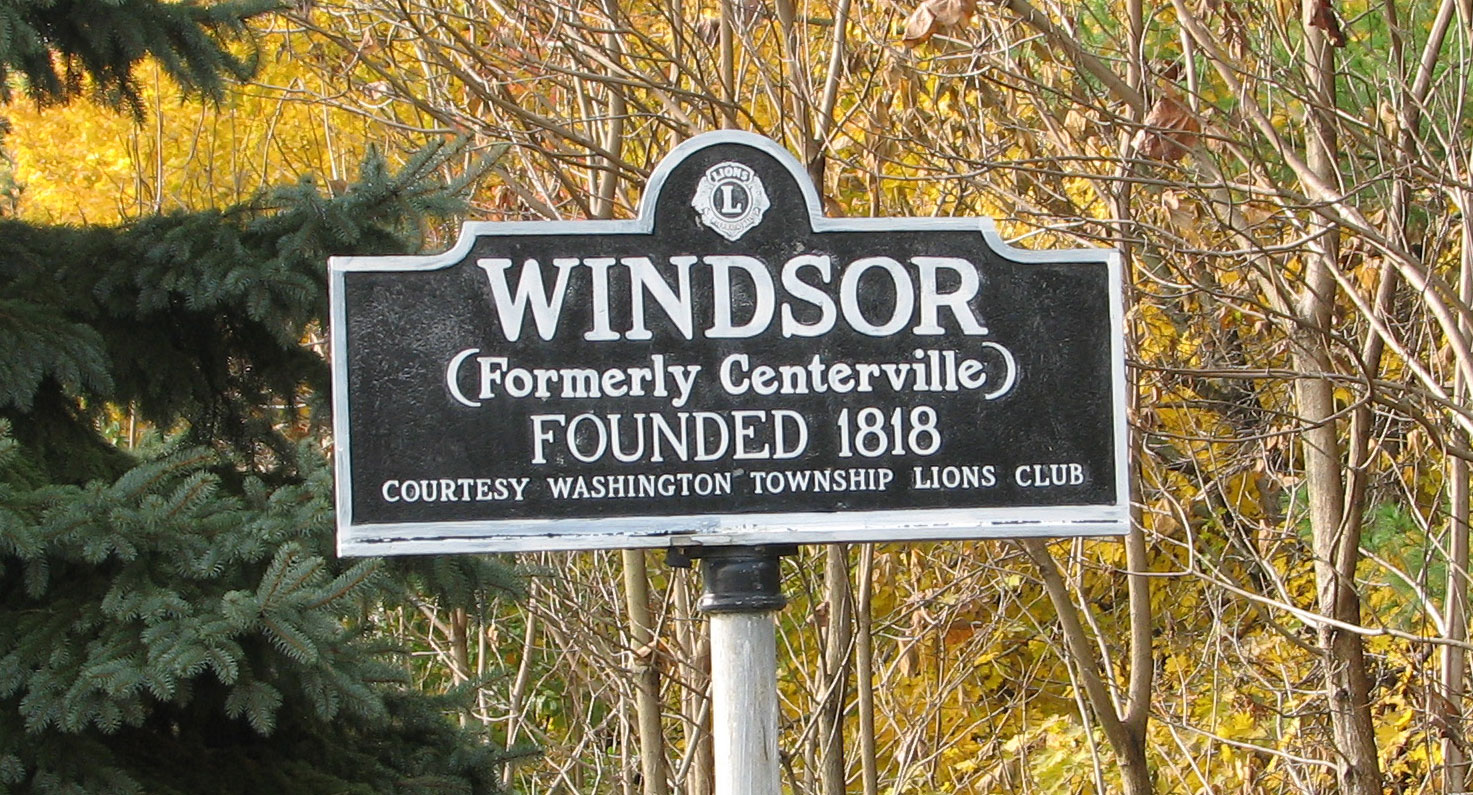
Sign posted at the corner of Main and Church Streets in the historic village of Windsor.

Historical population
Census	Pop.	Note	%±
1860	1,279		—
1870	1,294		1.2%
1880	1,281		−1.0%
1890	1,126		−12.1%
1900	1,157		2.8%
1910	1,090		−5.8%
1920	1,161		6.5%
1930	1,347		16.0%
1940	1,365		1.3%
1950	1,843		35.0%
1960	2,156		17.0%
1970	3,311		53.6%
1980	3,487		5.3%
1990	5,815		66.8%
2000	10,275		76.7%
2010	13,642		32.8%
2020	15,476		13.4%
2023 (est.)	15,361		−0.7%
Population sources: 1860–1920 1860–1870; 1870 1880–1890; 1890–1910 1910–1930; 1940–2000 2000; 2010 2020

=== 2010 census ===
The 2010 United States census counted 13,642 people, 5,087 households, and 3,591 families in the township. The population density was 671.5 per square mile (259.3/km^{2}). There were 5,277 housing units at an average density of 259.7 per square mile (100.3/km^{2}). The racial makeup was 81.59% (11,131) White, 3.12% (426) Black or African American, 0.10% (13) Native American, 12.67% (1,729) Asian, 0.00% (0) Pacific Islander, 0.71% (97) from other races, and 1.80% (246) from two or more races. Hispanic or Latino of any race were 4.13% (564) of the population.

Of the 5,087 households, 41.7% had children under the age of 18; 60.0% were married couples living together; 7.7% had a female householder with no husband present and 29.4% were non-families. Of all households, 25.8% were made up of individuals and 8.6% had someone living alone who was 65 years of age or older. The average household size was 2.66 and the average family size was 3.26.

28.7% of the population were under the age of 18, 4.3% from 18 to 24, 28.4% from 25 to 44, 28.8% from 45 to 64, and 9.7% who were 65 years of age or older. The median age was 39.2 years. For every 100 females, the population had 91.3 males. For every 100 females ages 18 and older there were 87.8 males.

The Census Bureau's 2006–2010 American Community Survey showed that (in 2010 inflation-adjusted dollars) median household income was $92,440 (with a margin of error of +/− $11,773) and the median family income was $124,816 (+/− $10,353). Males had a median income of $96,156 (+/− $4,577) versus $65,327 (+/− $8,597) for females. The per capita income for the borough was $44,149 (+/− $2,813). About 2.7% of families and 3.1% of the population were below the poverty line, including 3.7% of those under age 18 and 4.9% of those age 65 or over.

=== 2000 census ===
As of the 2000 United States census there were 10,275 people, 4,074 households, and 2,815 families residing in the township. The population density was 501.8 inhabitants per square mile (193.7/km^{2}). There were 4,163 housing units at an average density of 203.3 per square mile (78.5/km^{2}). The racial makeup of the township was 91.00% White, 2.89% African American, 0.14% Native American, 4.31% Asian, 0.55% from other races, and 1.11% from two or more races. Hispanic or Latino of any race were 2.72% of the population.

There were 4,074 households, out of which 36.0% had children under the age of 18 living with them, 59.8% were married couples living together, 7.3% had a female householder with no husband present, and 30.9% were non-families. 26.4% of all households were made up of individuals, and 7.4% had someone living alone who was 65 years of age or older. The average household size was 2.52 and the average family size was 3.09.

In the township the population was spread out, with 26.1% under the age of 18, 3.7% from 18 to 24, 37.9% from 25 to 44, 22.6% from 45 to 64, and 9.7% who were 65 years of age or older. The median age was 37 years. For every 100 females, there were 91.4 males. For every 100 females age 18 and over, there were 87.7 males.

The median income for a household in the township was $71,377, and the median income for a family was $90,878. Males had a median income of $61,589 versus $44,653 for females. The per capita income for the township was $35,529. About 2.5% of families and 3.7% of the population were below the poverty line, including 4.1% of those under age 18 and 5.0% of those age 65 or over.

== Government ==
=== Local government ===
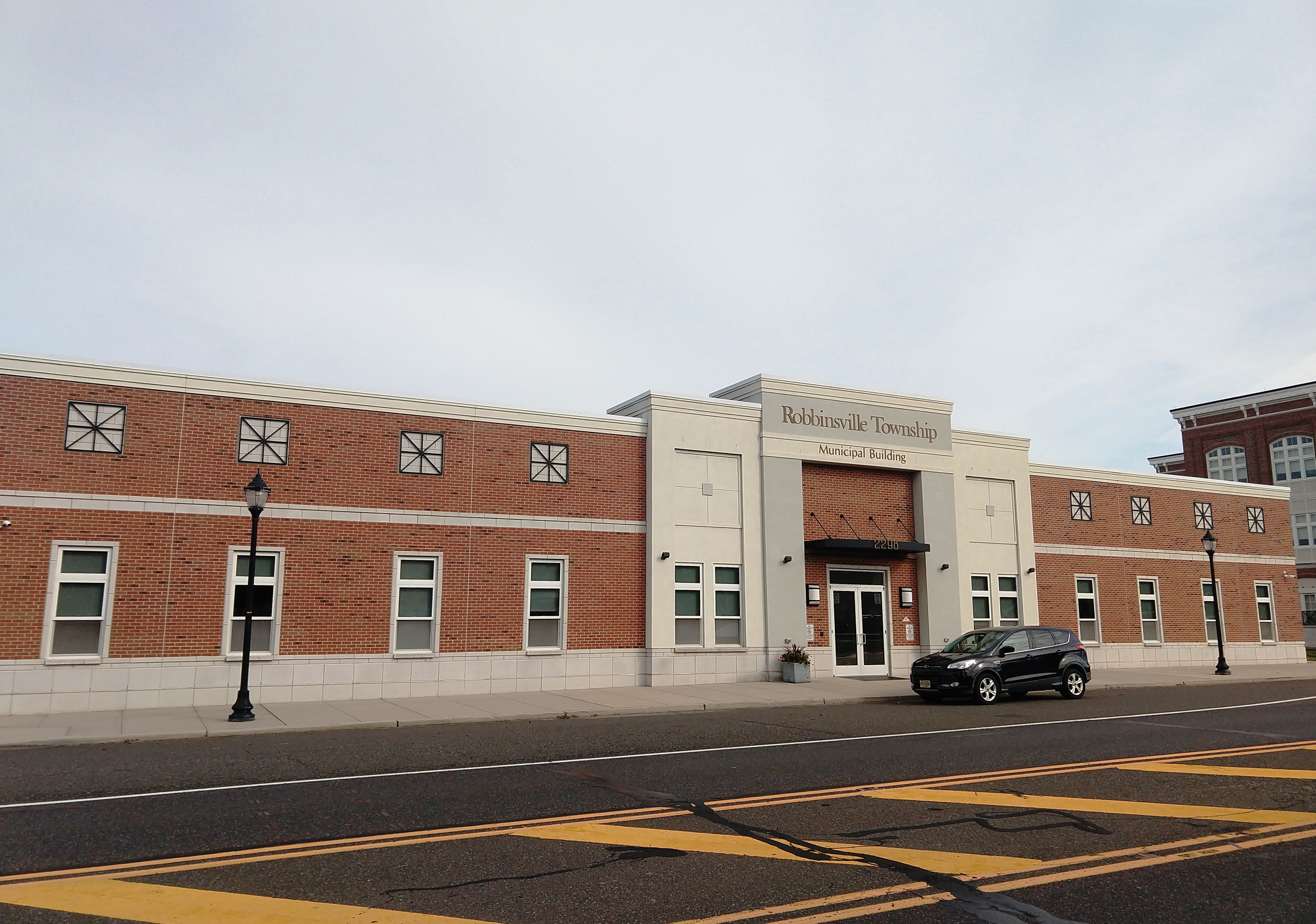
Robbinsville Township Municipal Building

In November 2004, township residents voted to change their form of government from a Township Committee to a Mayor-Council form under the Faulkner Act. The new form of government took effect as of July 1, 2005. The Mayor-Council form of government is used by 71 of the state's 564 municipalities. In this form, the governing body is comprised of the Mayor and the Township Council, each functioning as an independent branch of government, with all members elected at-large to four-year terms of office on a non-partisan basis as part of the November general election. The Mayor is the Chief Executive of the Township and heads its Administration. The Mayor may attend Council meetings but is not obliged to do so. The council is the legislative branch. Elections are held in odd-numbered years with three council seats up together and the two other seats (and the mayoral seat) up for election two years later. At the annual organizational meeting held during the first week of January of each year, the Council selects a President and Vice President to serve for one-year terms. The Council President chairs the meetings of the governing body. Following an ordinance passed in December 2011, municipal elections were shifted from May to November, with the terms of all township council members then serving extend by six months, to December 31.

As of 2026, the Mayor of Robbinsville Township is Michael J. Todd. Members of the Township Council are Council President Deborah Blakely (2030), Vice President Hal English (2030), Christine "Chris" Ciaccio (2028), Ravi Patni (2026) and Amit Chopra (2028).

In January 2021, Deborah Blakely was appointed to fill the term expiring in December 2023 that had become vacant following the resignation of Dan Schuberth. Blakely served on an interim basis until the November 2021 election. In the November 2021 general election, Michael Todd was elected to serve the balance of Schuberth's term of office, while Deborah Blakely ran for and won a full four-year term.

=== Federal, state, and county representation ===
Robbinsville Township is located in the 3rd Congressional District and is part of New Jersey's 14th state legislative district.

For the 119th United States Congress, New Jersey's 3rd congressional district is currently represented Herb Conaway (D, Delran Township). New Jersey is represented in the United States Senate by Democrats Cory Booker (Newark, term ends 2027) and Andy Kim (Moorestown, term ends 2031).

For the 2026–2027 session, the 14th legislative district of the New Jersey Legislature is represented in the State Senate by Linda R. Greenstein (D, Plainsboro Township) and in the General Assembly by Wayne DeAngelo (D, Hamilton Township) and Tennille McCoy (D, Hamilton Township).

Mercer County is governed by a County Executive who oversees the day-to-day operations of the county and by a seven-member Board of County Commissioners that acts in a legislative capacity, setting policy. All officials are chosen at-large in partisan elections, with the executive serving a four-year term of office while the commissioners serve three-year terms of office on a staggered basis, with either two or three seats up for election each year as part of the November general election. As of 2025, the County Executive is Daniel R. Benson (D, Hamilton Township) whose term of office ends December 31, 2027. Mercer County's Commissioners are:

Lucylle R. S. Walter (D, Ewing Township, 2026), Chair John A. Cimino (D, Hamilton Township, 2026), Samuel T. Frisby Sr. (D, Trenton, 2027), Cathleen M. Lewis (D, Lawrence Township, 2025), Vice Chair Kristin L. McLaughlin (D, Hopewell Township, 2027), Nina D. Melker (D, Hamilton Township, 2025) and Terrance Stokes (D, Ewing Township, 2027).

Mercer County's constitutional officers are: Clerk Paula Sollami-Covello (D, Lawrence Township, 2025), Sheriff John A. Kemler (D, Hamilton Township, 2026) and Surrogate Diane Gerofsky (D, Lawrence Township, 2026).

=== Politics ===
As of March 2011, there were a total of 8,361 registered voters in Robbinsville Township, of which 2,186 (26.1%) were registered as Democrats, 2,068 (24.7%) were registered as Republicans and 4,101 (49.0%) were registered as Unaffiliated. There were 6 voters registered as Libertarians or Greens.

United States presidential election results for Robbinsville
Year	Republican		Democratic		Third party(ies)	
Year	No.	%	No.	%	No.	%
2024	3,541	42.69%	4,515	54.43%	239	2.88%
2020	3,626	40.67%	5,168	57.97%	121	1.36%
2016	3,215	43.93%	3,777	51.61%	327	4.47%
2012	3,297	49.08%	3,332	49.61%	88	1.31%
2008	3,099	47.09%	3,406	51.76%	76	1.15%
2004	3,215	53.80%	2,718	45.48%	43	0.72%

In the 2024 presidential election, Democrat Kamala Harris received 54.4% of the vote (4,515 cast), ahead of Republican Donald Trump with 42.7% (3,541 votes), and other candidates with 2.9% (239 votes), among the 8,373 ballots cast by the township's 12,346 registered voters, for a turnout of 67.8%. In the 2020 presidential election, Joe Biden won the town 58.0% to 40.8%, a margin that was to the left of the state as a whole. In the 2016 election, Hillary Clinton won the town 51.6% to 43.9%.

Gubernatorial election results for Robbinsville
Year	Republican		Democratic		Third party(ies)	
Year	No.	%	No.	%	No.	%
2025	2,434	38.50%	3,856	60.99%	32	0.51%
2021	2,501	46.05%	2,846	52.40%	84	1.55%
2017	2,159	48.56%	2,190	49.26%	97	2.18%
2013	2,102	62.30%	1,228	36.40%	44	1.30%
2009	2,508	58.31%	1,503	34.95%	290	6.74%
2005	2,174	55.29%	1,602	40.74%	156	3.97%

In the 2021 New Jersey gubernatorial election, Democrat Phil Murphy received 52.4% of the votes cast (2,846), outrunning Republican Jack Ciattarelli with 46.1% (2,501 votes), and other candidates with 1.5% (84 votes). In the 2017 New Jersey gubernatorial election, Democrat Phil Murphy received 49.3% of votes cast (2,190 votes) in Robbinsville, ahead of Republican Kim Guadagno with 48.6% (2,159 votes), and other candidates with 2.2% (97 votes). In the 2013 gubernatorial election, Republican Chris Christie received 60.6% of the vote (2,102 cast), ahead of Democrat Barbara Buono with 35.4% (1,228 votes), and other candidates with 3.9% (136 votes), among the 4,433 ballots cast by the township's 9,076 registered voters (967 ballots were spoiled), for a turnout of 48.8%. In the 2009 gubernatorial election, Republican Chris Christie received 57.9% of the vote here (2,508 ballots cast), ahead of Democrat Jon Corzine with 34.7% (1,503 votes), Independent Chris Daggett with 6.0% (262 votes) and other candidates with 0.6% (28 votes), among the 4,331 ballots cast by the township's 8,379 registered voters, yielding a 51.7% turnout.

United States Senate election results for Robbinsville1
Year	Republican		Democratic		Third party(ies)	
Year	No.	%	No.	%	No.	%
2024	3,267	40.48%	4,606	57.07%	198	2.45%
2018	2,415	46.76%	2,557	49.51%	193	3.74%
2012	3,066	48.70%	3,106	49.33%	124	1.97%
2006	1,778	51.70%	1,557	45.27%	104	3.02%

United States Senate election results for Robbinsville2
Year	Republican		Democratic		Third party(ies)	
Year	No.	%	No.	%	No.	%
2020	3,743	43.10%	4,842	55.75%	100	1.15%
2014	1,637	50.26%	1,549	47.56%	71	2.18%
2013	1,153	49.83%	1,066	46.07%	95	4.11%
2008	3,211	52.75%	2,769	45.49%	107	1.76%

== Education ==
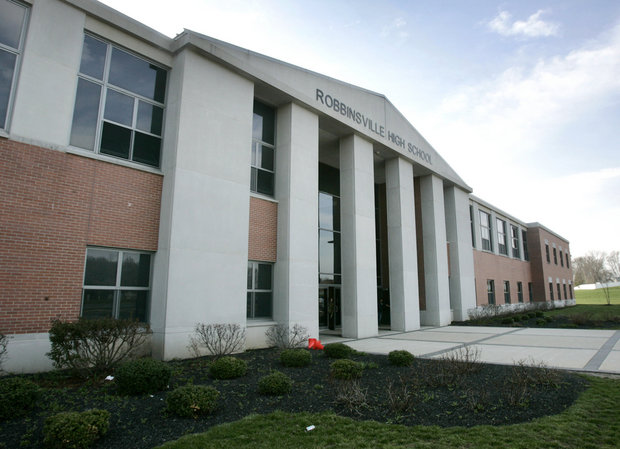
Robbinsville High School, located along Robbinsville Edinburg Road.

The Robbinsville Public School District serves students in kindergarten through twelfth grade. As of the 2022–23 school year, the district, comprised of three schools, had an enrollment of 3,073 students and 253.4 classroom teachers (on an FTE basis), for a student–teacher ratio of 12.1:1. Schools in the district (with 2022–23 enrollment data from the National Center for Education Statistics) are Sharon Elementary School with 1,005 students in grades PreK-4, Pond Road Middle School with 992 students in grades 5–8 and Robbinsville High School with 1,057 students in grades 9–12.

Prior to the 2006–07 school year, high school students went to Lawrence High School in Lawrence Township as part of a sending/receiving relationship with the Lawrence Township Public Schools. Robbinsville High School currently serves all of Robbinsville Township's high school students on site, and graduated its first class of 150 students in June 2008.

Eighth grade students from all of Mercer County are eligible to apply to attend the high school programs offered by the Mercer County Technical Schools, a county-wide vocational school district that offers full-time career and technical education at its Health Sciences Academy, STEM Academy and Academy of Culinary Arts, with no tuition charged to students for attendance.

== Development ==
Robbinsville Town Center, near the intersection of U.S. Route 130 and Route 33, is a mix of about 1,000 housing units, including loft-style condominiums, townhouses, duplexes, single-family homes, and real estate space.

Plans are underway to redevelop the portion of the township which lies to the south of Route 33, between the Hamilton Township border and U.S. Route 130. In December 2010, the state approved designating this property as an area in need of development, which allows the township to draft a plan and appoint a redeveloper to revive stalled construction projects there.

Robbinsville is home to a large warehouse colony, located on West Manor Way, just adjacent to the entrances and exit ramps to exits 7 and 8 off of Interstate 195. It is home to a variety of companies' distribution centers, including Scholastic Books, JDSU, Sleepy's, and Grainger Products. The Robbinsville Field House is a large membership gym located at the entrance to the warehouse colony near Route 526. An Amazon.com Fulfillment Center warehouse opened in the Matrix Business Park off of CR 539 in July 2014.

== Transportation ==
=== Roads and highways ===
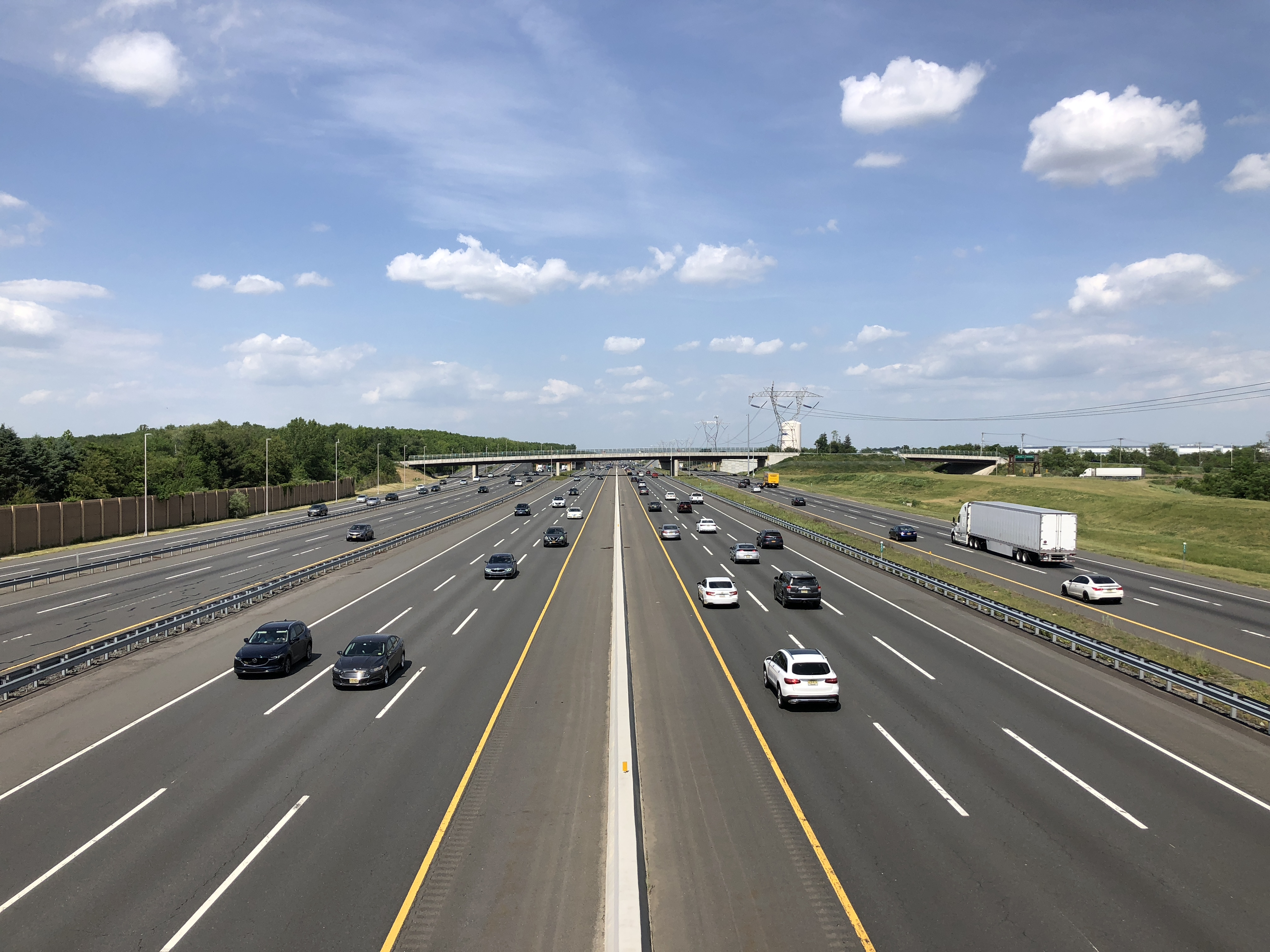
View northward of 14 lanes at Exit 7A of the New Jersey Turnpike (Interstate 95) as seen from the Interstate 195 (Central Jersey Expressway) overpass

As of May 2010, the township had a total of 100 miles (160 km) of roadways, of which 78.26 miles (125.95 km) were maintained by the municipality, 8.16 miles (13.13 km) by Mercer County, 8.37 miles (13.47 km) by the New Jersey Department of Transportation and 5.20 miles (8.37 km) by the New Jersey Turnpike Authority.

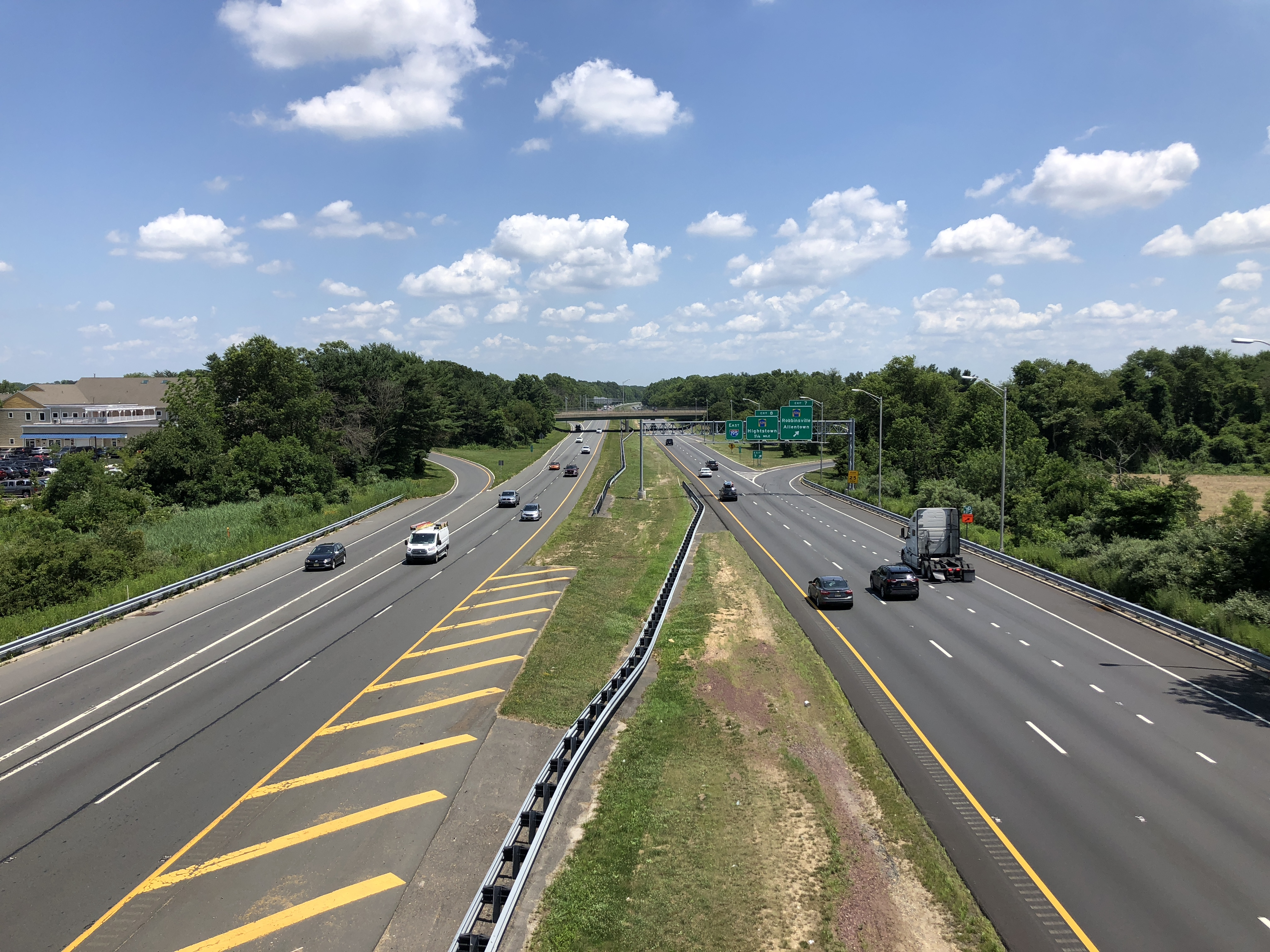
The east-west Interstate 195 (Central Jersey Expressway) is the largest highway providing access to local roads in Robbinsville.

Four major U.S./State/Interstate routes pass through the township: the New Jersey Turnpike (Interstate 95), Interstate 195 (the Central Jersey Expressway), U.S. Route 130 and Route 33. County routes that pass through include County Route 526 (which passes through the center of the township) and both County Route 524 and County Route 539 (Old York Road), which travel along the southeastern border of the township.

Interstate 195 is a major east–west artery that connects New Jersey's state capital of Trenton eastward to Robbinsville (at the New Jersey Turnpike's exit 7A) and then onward to the Garden State Parkway at Wall Township, thereby providing Robbinsville with direct access to the Jersey Shore region. Interchange 7A (for the Turnpike) is located within the township, with a 13-lane toll gate. Interstate 195 also provides access to Six Flags Great Adventure in Jackson Township.

=== Public transportation ===
NJ Transit provides bus service to and from Trenton on the 606 route.

Robbinsville Township is home to Trenton-Robbinsville Airport (identifier N87), an uncontrolled general aviation airport, with a 4,275-foot (1,303 m) long runway. The airport averages 30,000 aircraft operations per year.

== Sports ==
Robbinsville Township reached the Little League Softball World Series in four of the seven years from 2008 to 2014, the only program in the nation to do so. The team won the championship in 2014 with a 22–0 postseason record and a 4–1 win against Bossier City, Louisiana in the tournament final. That year, an ESPN article described the town as "arguably the biggest hotbed of girls' softball players in the country."

== Points of interest ==
=== Wineries ===
- Working Dog Winery

=== Restaurants ===
- Papa's Tomato Pies
- De Lorenzo's Tomato Pies

=== Religious institutions ===
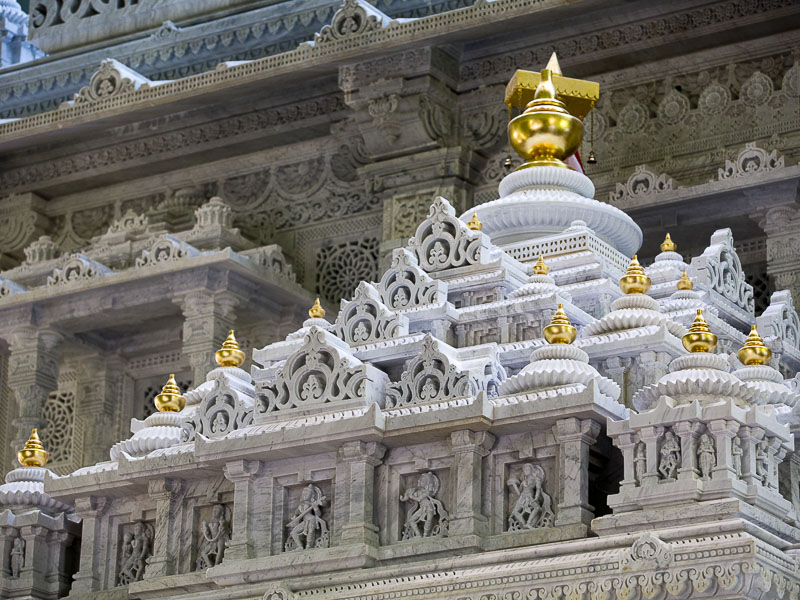
Swaminarayan Akshardham in Robbinsville is the second-largest Hindu temple in the world.

Swaminarayan Akshardham, a Hindu temple inaugurated in 2023, was constructed by 12,500 volunteers on a 180-acre (73 ha) site and has a spire reaching 191 feet (58 m). It is the largest Hindu temple outside of Asia and the second largest Hindu temple in the world.

== Climate ==
According to the Köppen climate classification system, Robbinsville Township has a Hot-summer Humid continental climate (Dfa).

Climate data for Robbinsville Twp (40.2220, -74.5910), 1991-2020 normals, extremes 1981-2024
Month	Jan	Feb	Mar	Apr	May	Jun	Jul	Aug	Sep	Oct	Nov	Dec	Year
Record high °F (°C)	71.8 (22.1)	77.6 (25.3)	88.1 (31.2)	95.1 (35.1)	95.4 (35.2)	97.8 (36.6)	102.2 (39.0)	101.3 (38.5)	97.5 (36.4)	93.7 (34.3)	82.7 (28.2)	75.5 (24.2)	102.2 (39.0)
Mean daily maximum °F (°C)	40.5 (4.7)	43.0 (6.1)	50.7 (10.4)	62.9 (17.2)	72.5 (22.5)	81.7 (27.6)	86.3 (30.2)	84.5 (29.2)	78.0 (25.6)	66.2 (19.0)	55.5 (13.1)	45.5 (7.5)	64.0 (17.8)
Daily mean °F (°C)	32.0 (0.0)	34.0 (1.1)	41.3 (5.2)	52.3 (11.3)	61.9 (16.6)	71.1 (21.7)	76.1 (24.5)	74.3 (23.5)	67.6 (19.8)	55.8 (13.2)	45.6 (7.6)	37.1 (2.8)	54.2 (12.3)
Mean daily minimum °F (°C)	23.5 (−4.7)	25.0 (−3.9)	31.9 (−0.1)	41.7 (5.4)	51.4 (10.8)	60.5 (15.8)	65.9 (18.8)	64.0 (17.8)	57.1 (13.9)	45.4 (7.4)	35.6 (2.0)	28.7 (−1.8)	44.3 (6.8)
Record low °F (°C)	−10.6 (−23.7)	−3.7 (−19.8)	3.7 (−15.7)	18.0 (−7.8)	32.4 (0.2)	40.6 (4.8)	47.7 (8.7)	42.1 (5.6)	36.0 (2.2)	24.5 (−4.2)	10.6 (−11.9)	0.2 (−17.7)	−10.6 (−23.7)
Average precipitation inches (mm)	3.50 (89)	2.64 (67)	4.26 (108)	3.65 (93)	3.99 (101)	4.47 (114)	4.89 (124)	4.44 (113)	4.10 (104)	3.90 (99)	3.27 (83)	4.26 (108)	47.37 (1,203)
Average snowfall inches (cm)	7.6 (19)	8.2 (21)	3.8 (9.7)	0.1 (0.25)	0.0 (0.0)	0.0 (0.0)	0.0 (0.0)	0.0 (0.0)	0.0 (0.0)	0.1 (0.25)	0.6 (1.5)	3.6 (9.1)	24.1 (61)
Average dew point °F (°C)	21.8 (−5.7)	22.6 (−5.2)	28.0 (−2.2)	37.5 (3.1)	49.3 (9.6)	59.5 (15.3)	64.4 (18.0)	63.7 (17.6)	57.8 (14.3)	46.3 (7.9)	35.2 (1.8)	27.5 (−2.5)	42.9 (6.1)
Source 1: PRISM
Source 2: NOHRSC (Snow, 2008/2009 - 2024/2025 normals)

== Ecology ==
According to the A. W. Kuchler U.S. potential natural vegetation types, Robbinsville Township would have a dominant vegetation type of Appalachian Oak (104) with a dominant vegetation form of Eastern Hardwood Forest (25).

== Notable people ==
People who were born in, residents of, or otherwise closely associated with Robbinsville Township include:

- Shobhan Bantwal (born 1950), Indian American writer
- Henry Charlton Beck (1902–1965), author, journalist, historian, ordained Episcopal minister and folklorist
- Ross Colton (born 1996), center for the Colorado Avalanche, who scored the series-clinching goal for the Tampa Bay Lightning in a 1–0 victory in Game 5 of the 2021 Stanley Cup Finals
- Frank Eliason (born 1972), corporate executive and author
- John Friedberg (born 1961), fencer who competed in the team sabre event at the 1992 Summer Olympics in Barcelona
- Elijah C. Hutchinson (1855–1932), represented New Jersey's 4th congressional district from 1915 to 1923
- Samantha Josephson (1997–2019), college student whose 2019 murder led to the passage of Sami’s Law
- Edmund Yard Robbins (1867–1942), philologist, who was a professor of Greek language and literature at Princeton University
- Robert "Bobby" Smith (born 1951), retired U.S. soccer defender and National Soccer Hall of Fame member, owner of Bob Smith Soccer Academy in Robbinsville Township
- Caedan Wallace (born 2000), NFL offensive tackle for the New England Patriots
