= Robbinsville Public School District =

School district in Mercer County, New Jersey, US

Address
- 155 Robbinsville-Edinburg Road Robbinsville Township, Mercer County, New Jersey, 08691
- Coordinates: 40.237371°N 74.615212°W

District information
- Grades: K-12
- Superintendent: Patrick Pizzo
- Business administrator: Nick Mackres
- Schools: 3

Students and staff
- Enrollment: 3,073 (as of 2022–23)
- Faculty: 253.4 FTEs
- Student–teacher ratio: 12.1:1

Other information
- District Factor Group: I
- Website: www.robbinsville.k12.nj.us
Ind.	Per pupil	District spending	Rank (*)	K-12 average	%± vs. average
1A	Total Spending	$14,969	4	$18,891	−20.8%
1	Budgetary Cost	11,104	3	14,783	−24.9%
2	Classroom Instruction	6,514	3	8,763	−25.7%
6	Support Services	1,566	6	2,392	−34.5%
8	Administrative Cost	1,133	2	1,485	−23.7%
10	Operations & Maintenance	1,379	15	1,783	−22.7%
13	Extracurricular Activities	475	53	268	77.2%
16	Median Teacher Salary	57,942	13	64,043
Data from NJDoE 2014 Taxpayers' Guide to Education Spending. *Of K-12 districts with 1,800-3,500 students. Lowest spending=1; Highest=68

The Robbinsville Public School District is a comprehensive community public school district serving students in pre-kindergarten through twelfth grade in Robbinsville Township (known as Washington Township until 2007), in Mercer County, in the U.S. state of New Jersey.

A new high school was established in the district, which started admitting its first students in 2004–05 as part of ending a sending/receiving relationship with the Lawrence Township Public Schools under which students had attended Lawrence High School.

As of the 2022–23 school year, the district, comprised of three schools, had an enrollment of 3,073 students and 253.4 classroom teachers (on an FTE basis), for a student–teacher ratio of 12.1:1.

The district is classified by the New Jersey Department of Education as being in District Factor Group "I", the second-highest of eight groupings. District Factor Groups organize districts statewide to allow comparison by common socioeconomic characteristics of the local districts. From lowest socioeconomic status to highest, the categories are A, B, CD, DE, FG, GH, I and J.

== History ==
In 1981, the-then Washington Township district filed a petition with the New Jersey State Board of Education seeking to terminate their sending/receiving relationship with the Upper Freehold Regional School District, noting that the departure of students from Washington Township would not adversely impact the racial balance at Allentown High School. After receiving approval, starting in the 1990–91 school year, students from Washington Township, began attending Lawrence High School, under which all of the township's students would leave Allentown High School by the end of the 1993–94 school year.

There was a great struggle in the community to get the high school approved, with a referendum passing in 2001 by a 51–49% margin to approve the construction of a $50 million high school building, while a separate ballot for a pool price at $4.4 million was rejected. The school was first opened in 2004 as a wing in the middle school housing ninth graders. The plan was to start with only freshmen and each year fill in an additional grade. In 2005, the new high school building opened.

The sending relationship with the Lawrence Township Public Schools ended with the final group of seniors who graduated in the 2006–07 school year. As of the 2007–08 school year, all four high school grades were housed on campus and the school graduated its first class of approximately 150 students.

== Schools ==
Schools in the district (with 2022–23 enrollment data from the National Center for Education Statistics) are:

Elementary school

- Sharon Elementary School with 1,005 students in grades PreK-4
  - Nicole Bootier, principal

Middle school

- Pond Road Middle School with 992 students in grades 5–8
  - Paul Gizzo, principal

High school

- Robbinsville High School with 1,057 students in grades 9–12
  - Thomas Brettell, principal

== Administration ==
Core members of the district's administration are:

- Kristy DeFazio, superintendent
- Nick Mackres, business administrator and board secretary

== Board of education ==
The district's board of education, comprised of nine elected members, sets policy and oversees the fiscal and educational operation of the district through its administration. As a Type II school district, the board's trustees are elected directly by voters to serve three-year terms of office on a staggered basis, with three seats up for election each year held (since 2012) as part of the November general election. The board appoints a superintendent to oversee the district's day-to-day operations and a business administrator to supervise the business functions of the district.
