= Lawrence High School (New Jersey) =

High school in Mercer County, New Jersey, US

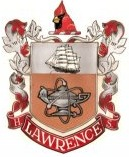

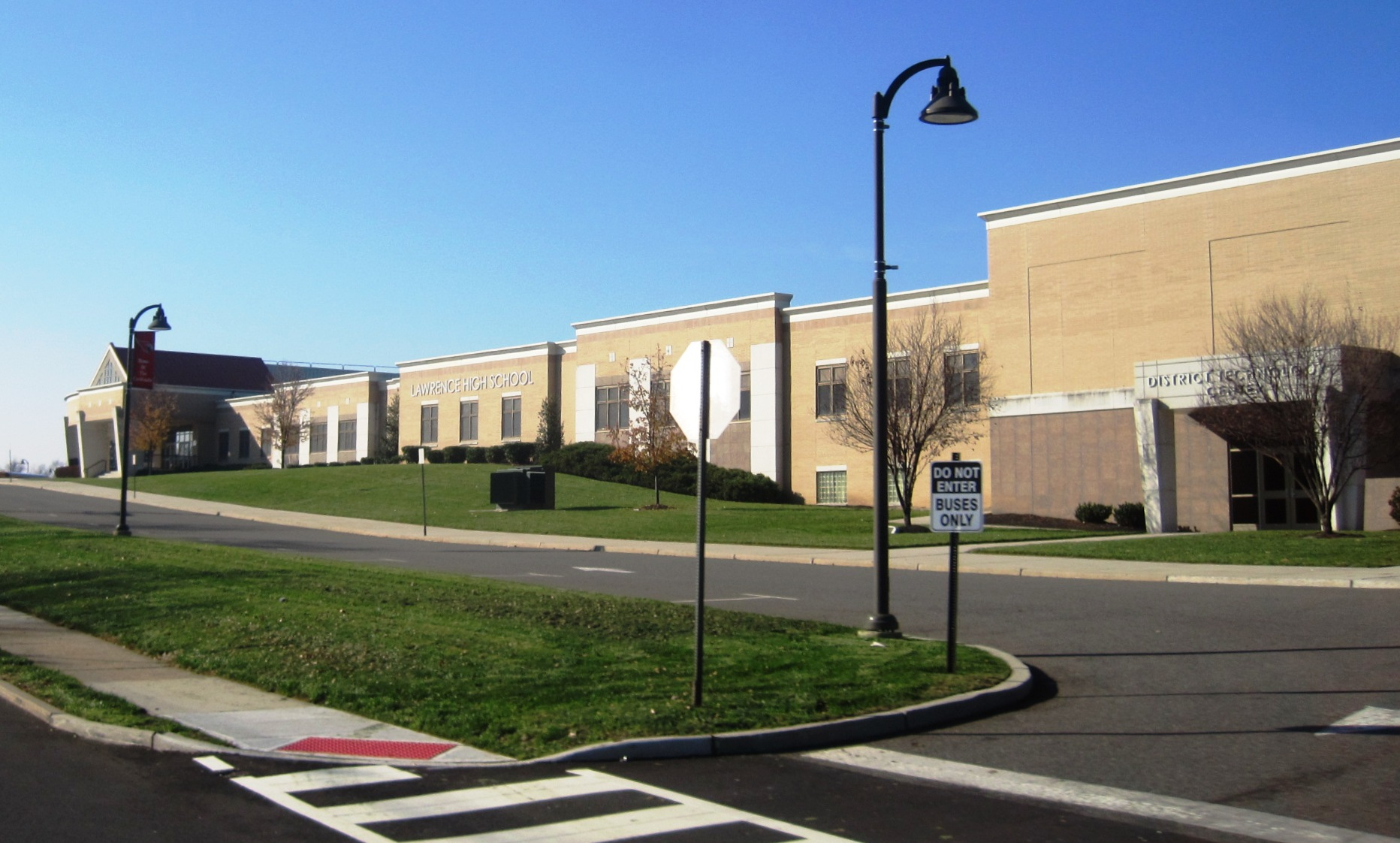

Location
- 2525 Princeton Pike (CR 583); Lawrence Township, Mercer County, New Jersey 08648; United States
- 40.264214°N 74.730573°W

Information
- Type: Public high school
- Established: 1966
- School district: Lawrence Township Public Schools
- NCES School ID: 340840003152
- Principal: David J. Adam
- Faculty: 98.0 FTEs
- Grades: 9-12
- Enrollment: 1,225 (as of 2024–25)
- Student to teacher ratio: 12.5:1
- Colors: Red and white
- Athletics conference: Colonial Valley Conference (general); West Jersey Football League (football)
- Team name: Cardinals
- Rivals: Notre Dame High School Hopewell Valley Central High School
- Publication: Tangents (literary/art magazine)
- Newspaper: The Lawrencian
- Facilities: full gymnasium auxiliary gymnasium cafeteria 5 tennis courts 3 park tennis courts full track stadium style seating swimming facility (6 lanes) w/ seating 2 soccer fields 3 baseball/softball fields 2 multipurpose fields large auditorium w/ stage
- Website: lhs.ltps.org

Lawrence High School (LHS) is a four-year comprehensive public high school in Lawrence Township, in Mercer County, in the U.S. state of New Jersey, serving students in ninth through twelfth grades as the lone secondary school of the Lawrence Township Public Schools. The school is located in the Lawrenceville section of the township. The school has been accredited by the Middle States Association of Colleges and Schools Commission on Elementary and Secondary Schools since 1992.

As of the 2024–25 school year, the school had an enrollment of 1,225 students and 98.0 classroom teachers (on an FTE basis), for a student–teacher ratio of 12.5:1. There were 364 students (29.7% of enrollment) eligible for free lunch and 93 (7.6% of students) eligible for reduced-cost lunch.

The school colors are red and white. The school mascot is the cardinal.

== History ==
Lawrence High School opened in 1966 and celebrated its 50th anniversary in the 2016–2017 school year.

Students from Plainsboro Township switched from Hightstown High School to Lawrence High School in 1979.

Students from Robbinsville Township (known as Washington Township until 2007) had attended Allentown High School exclusively until the start of the 1990-91 school year and switched over to Lawrence High School as part of a sending/receiving relationship which ended with the final graduating class of 2007, after which all students attended Robbinsville High School.

The Cranbury School District had sent students to Lawrence High School before they began a relationship with Princeton High School.

== Awards, recognition and rankings ==
The school was the 102nd-ranked public high school in New Jersey out of 305 schools statewide in New Jersey Monthly magazine's September 2018 cover story on the state's "Top Public High Schools" The school had previously been ranked in the top 75 and 100 in previous years' rankings.

The music program has been consistently rated one of the best "Communities in the Nation for Music Education" since 2005 by the NAMM Foundation.

== Curriculum ==
Lawrence High School offers numerous honors and Advanced Placement (AP) classes including Biology, Calculus, Chemistry, Economics, English, Environmental Science, European History, Music Theory, Physics, Statistics, Studio Art, United States Government and Politics, and United States History. The school also offers Cisco I and II, a certified networking course from Cisco Systems. LHS also offers many electives such as drafting, design and photography.

== Athletics ==
The Lawrence High School Cardinals compete in the Colonial Valley Conference, which is comprised of public and private schools in Mercer County and operates under the supervision of the New Jersey State Interscholastic Athletic Association (NJSIAA). With 842 students in grades 10–12, the school was classified by the NJSIAA for the 2019–20 school year as Group III for most athletic competition purposes, which included schools with an enrollment of 761 to 1,058 students in that grade range. The football team competes in the Valley Division of the 94-team West Jersey Football League superconference and was classified by the NJSIAA as Group IV South for football for 2024–2026, which included schools with 890 to 1,298 students. The school's most successful teams include football, golf, wrestling, soccer, swimming, diving, tennis, softball, cheerleading and cross-country.

The school participates as the host school / lead agency in a joint ice hockey team with Ewing High School and Hightstown High School. The co-op program operates under agreements scheduled to expire at the end of the 2023–24 school year.

The boys' soccer team won the Group II state championship in 1967 (defeating Northern Highlands Regional High School in the tournament final), 1969 (vs. Morris Knolls High School), 1970 (vs. Shore Regional High School), 1971 (vs. Point Pleasant Borough High School), 1973 and 1975 (vs. Garfield High School both years), 1980 (vs. Governor Livingston High School) and 1994 (vs. Scotch Plains-Fanwood High School), and won the Group III state title in 1968 (vs. Glen Rock High School); The nine state championships are tied for eighth-most of any program statewide and the streak of five consecutive titles from 1967 to 1971 is the longest for any public school. The program won its first state title in 1967 with a 3–2 win against Northern Highlands in the Group II championship game. The 1968 team finished the season with a record of 15-2-3 after winning the Group III title with a 2–1 win against Glen Rock in the championship game played at Princeton University. A 4–1 win against Garfield in the 1973 Group II championship led the team to a season record of 15-3-1.

The football team was undefeated in 1973. The 1974 football team, featuring future NFL quarterback Scott Brunner, was overshadowed by a defensive unit that had eight shutouts and only allowed six points all year, with a record of 8-0-1, as part of a three-year undefeated stretch from 1972 to 1974 in the pre-playoff era where the team won 21 games and had one tie. The football team won the Colonial Valley Conference titles in 2004, 2005 and 2006. In 2006, the team made it to the state playoffs as the top seed, only to be knocked off by 8th-seeded Moorestown High School at home 19–14 in the first round of the tournament. In 2007, the team made it to state playoffs once again but were defeated by Middletown South at home in the first round, 16–6. The football team won the WJFL Patriot division title in 2013, made the state playoffs and defeated Allentown High School and Carteret High School to advance to the Central Jersey Group III Championship where they were defeated by Hopewell Valley Central High School.

The girls' spring / outdoor track team was the Group II state champion in 1979.

The boys' track team won the Group II winter / indoor track state championship in 1984 (as co-champion). The girls team won the Group II state title in 1987.

The boys' swimming team won the Public Central B sectional title in 2000 and 2008. The girls team won the Public Central A title in 2006.

The boys' wrestling team was the CVC Valley Division champions most recently in the 2003–04 season.

The boys' track and field Team was the CVC Patriot Division champions in 2010, 2011 and co-champions in 2013. Lawrence Girls track and field team were the 2014 CVC Patriot Division Co-Champions.

In 2012, the softball team won their first state sectional title in program history, winning the Central Jersey Group III title with a 3–2 win over Manasquan High School.

In 2019, the tennis team won the Group II state championship with a 3–2 win against Northern Valley Regional High School at Demarest in the tournament final.

== Administration ==
The school's principal is David J. Adam. His core administration team includes three assistant principals and the director of athletics.

== Noted alumni ==
- Ifa Bayeza (born Wanda Williams), playwright, producer and conceptual theater artist
- Brett Brackett (born 1987), tight end for the Jacksonville Jaguars
- Scott Brunner (born 1957), former professional quarterback who played in the NFL for the New York Giants
- Luke Elliot (born 1984), singer-songwriter and composer
- Dan Lavery (born 1969), musician who has been nominated for two Grammy Awards as part of the band Tonic
- Glenn "Mooch" Myernick (1954–2006), former professional soccer player and United States Soccer captain; in 1999, he was named by The Star-Ledger as one of the top ten New Jersey high school soccer players of the 1970s
- John Nalbone (born 1986), tight end who has played for the Philadelphia Eagles
- Patricia Russo (born 1952), former CEO and chairman of Alcatel-Lucent
- John Schneider (born 1980, class of 1998), professional baseball coach for the Toronto Blue Jays
- Jon Stewart (born 1962), comedian, director and host of Comedy Central's The Daily Show

== Notable faculty ==
- Teller (born Raymond Joseph Teller in 1948), silent half of Penn and Teller taught Latin at the school.
