= Robbinsville High School (New Jersey) =

High school in Mercer County, New Jersey, US

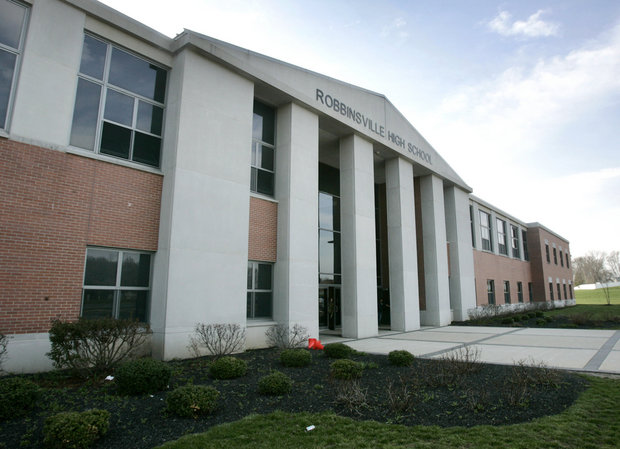
- Front entrance of Robbinsville High School, Robbinsville, New Jersey

Location
- 155 Robbinsville Edinburg Road; Robbinsville Township, Mercer County, New Jersey 08691; United States; 40.237371°N 74.615212°W

Information
- Type: Public high school
- Motto: Respect Achievement Vision Experience aNd Success (RAVENS)
- Established: 2005
- School district: Robbinsville Public School District
- NCES School ID: 341710000549
- Principal: Tom Brettell
- Faculty: 79.2 FTEs
- Grades: 9-12
- Enrollment: 1,046 (as of 2024–25)
- Student to teacher ratio: 13.2:1
- Colors: Black; Red; White
- Athletics conference: Colonial Valley Conference (general); West Jersey Football League (football)
- Team name: Ravens
- Newspaper: The Raven Report
- Website: rhs.robbinsvillek12.gov

Robbinsville High School is a comprehensive community public high school serving students in ninth through twelfth grades from Robbinsville Township, in Mercer County, in the U.S. state of New Jersey, operating as the lone secondary school of the Robbinsville Public School District. The school is accredited by the New Jersey Department of Education.

As of the 2024–25 school year, the school had an enrollment of 1,046 students and 79.2 classroom teachers (on an FTE basis), for a student–teacher ratio of 13.2:1. There were 47 students (4.5% of enrollment) eligible for free lunch and 28 (2.7% of students) eligible for reduced-cost lunch.

== Demographics ==
In the 2023–2024 school year, the student body was diverse, with the following racial and ethnic composition: White: 53.3 Asian 37.2% Hispanic 5.2% Black or African American 2.2% Two or more races 2.0%

== Awards, recognition and rankings ==
The school was the 59th-ranked public high school in New Jersey out of 339 schools statewide in New Jersey Monthly magazine's September 2014 cover story on the state's "Top Public High Schools," using a new ranking methodology. The school had been ranked 110th in the state of 328 schools in 2012, after being ranked 109th in 2010 out of 322 schools listed. Schooldigger.com ranked the school 43rd out of 389 public high schools statewide in its 2012 rankings, which was based on the combined percentage of students classified as proficient or above proficient on the mathematics (94.4%) and language arts literacy (98.1%) components of the High School Proficiency Assessment (HSPA).

The New Jersey State Interscholastic Athletic Association recognized Robbinsville High School as the Group I winner of the Seventh Annual ShopRite Cup in 2009–10, based on the overall performances of the school's athletic teams which included first-place finishes in boys' cross country and girls' soccer, second place in girls' cross country, third-place finishes in indoor track & field, baseball (tie) and wrestling (tie), along with finishing fourth in both girls' indoor relays and girls' outdoor track and field, with bonus points awarded for not having any disqualifications during the three sports seasons.

== History and facilities ==
There was a great struggle in the community to get the high school approved, and when it was approved, the vote was extremely close, with a referendum passing in 2001 by a 51-49% margin to approve the construction of a $50 million high school building, while a separate ballot for a pool price at $4.4 million was rejected. The school was first opened in 2004 as a wing in the middle school to house ninth graders. The plan was to start with only freshmen and each year fill in an additional grade. In 2005, the new high school building opened.

By the 2006–07 school year, only students in 12th grade from Robbinsville Township were attending Lawrence High School in Lawrence Township, as part of the final year of a sending/receiving relationship with the Lawrence Township Public Schools. With the start of the 2007–08 school year, the sending relationship had ended. As of 2008, Robbinsville High School serves all of Robbinsville Township's high school students on site. The school graduated its first class of 150 students in June 2008.

The school features a large common area with an atrium to serve as a cafeteria as well as several other purposes, an attached music wing, a central hallway which connects the commons area to the four main wings, the kitchen, the black box theater, the 1,000-seat auditorium with a 12-foot-deep (3.7 m) opera pit, the gymnasium wing (including a main gym, auxiliary gym, the weight room, locker rooms, and the trainer's office), and the main office as well as administrators offices on the first floor and contains much technology including a recording studio. Outside, there is a rubberized turf football field along with a track, an aerial obstacle course, and numerous sports fields for all seasons.

The foundations of two tennis courts had shifted over time, leading to cracking and instability and were shut down sometime before 2022. As of June 2026, these courts are yet to see any signs of repair, maintenance, or even demolition, especially considering the school's ongoing budgetary issues.

== Curriculum ==
Robbinsville High School offers a diverse curriculum to its students covering an art department, business department, English/ language arts department, family and consumer science department, health department, mathematics department, music and performing arts department, science department, social studies department, technology department, and world languages department. Students may also take classes at nearby colleges, typically Mercer County Community College.

=== Advanced Placement ===
Robbinsville High School offers advanced placement college credit in the following courses:

- Advanced Placement Art History
- Advanced Placement Biology
- Advanced Placement Calculus
- Advanced Placement Chemistry
- Advanced Placement Chinese Language and Culture
- Advanced Placement Computer Science
- Advanced Placement French Language
- Advanced Placement English Language and Composition
- Advanced Placement English Literature and Composition
- Advanced Placement Music Theory
- Advanced Placement Psychology
- Advanced Placement Physics 1
- Advanced Placement Physics 2
- Advanced Placement Spanish Language
- Advanced Placement Statistics
- Advanced Placement United States History
- Advanced Placement World History

== Extracurricular activities ==
Extracurricular activities and clubs offered at the high school include:

- Agriculture Club
- Art Club
- Automotive Club
- Black Culture Club
- Chinese Club
- The RHS Choir
- Dance Team
- Debate Team
- Drama Club
- Friends of Rachel Club
- Future Business Leaders of America (FBLA)
- Future Educators of America
- Gender-Sexuality Alliance Club
- Improv Club
- Interact Club
- Language Honor Society
- Literary Magazine
- Marching Band (including Color Guard)
- Math Club
- Model U.N.
- Multicultural Club
- Mock Trial
- National Honor Society
- Robotics Team
- Rocketry and Aerospace Club
- Science Olympiad
- Senior One Acts
- Ski Club
- Spanish Club
- Robbinsville Asian American Dance Association / Hindu Club (RAADA)
- Red Cross Club
- RHS Executive Council (Student Body Government)
- Class Councils (Class Governments)
- Technology Student Association
- Tri-M Music Honor Society

=== Debate team ===
The debate team finished an undefeated season in 2010 and was named Colonial Valley Conference champions. In 2011 the debate team renewed their title as champions.

=== Raven Regiment ===
The Raven Regiment received the "Best Visuals" award at the NJ State Marching Band Competition in 2009, and won fourth out of 23 bands at the Northern States Marching Band Competition in 2010. In their 2011 season, the Regiment took seventh out of 21 at Nationals in Allentown, Pennsylvania. The band also moved up from an IA class to a IIA class band.

In 2012, the Raven Regiment was the only New Jersey band invited to perform at the second annual Pearl Harbor Day Parade in Honolulu, Hawai'i.

In 2014, the band received the award for "Best Color Guard" at the USBands IIA state championships. They later placed fifth out of 18 bands at the National Championships.

The Raven Regiment moved up from a IIA to a IIIA class band in 2015.

In 2018, the Raven Regiment won first place out of nine bands at the USBands New Jersey State Championships (IIIA) in Glassboro, New Jersey, on October 28. The following week, the Raven Regiment placed second out of 16 bands at the USBands A Class National Championships (III) in Allentown, Pennsylvania, on November 4.

In 2022, the Raven Regiment moved up from a IIIA to an IVA class band.

In 2024, the Raven Regiment performed the Grade 2 show Breakout, written by composer Randall Standridge. The band placed 2nd out of 9 at the USBands New Jersey State Championships (IVA) in South Brunswick, New Jersey, on October 26. The following week, the Raven Regiment placed fourth out of 11 bands at the USBands A Class National Championships (IVA) in Allentown, Pennsylvania, on November 3.

In 2025, the Raven Regiment performed the Grade 3 show Mechanize, written by John Mapes and Ian Grom. The band placed 6th out of 10 at the USBands New Jersey State Championships (IVA) on their home turf, Robbinsville, on November 1. The following week, the Raven Regiment placed 4th out of 5 bands at the USBands A Class National Championships (IVA) in Allentown, Pennsylvania, on November 8.

In 2026, the Raven Regiment is set to perform the Grade 2-3 show Hocus Pocus, written by Michael J. Miller and Jason Palmer.

=== Robotics ===
With the assistance of a NASA 2008 rookie grant, Nemesis-FIRST Robotics Competition team 2590 won the "Rookie All Star," "Highest Scoring Rookie," and "Finalist" awards, and received the Entrepreneurship Award in 2009, 2012 and the 2012 Chairman's Award at the Lenape District. Nemesis won the 2012 Montreal Regional and the Lenape District and has placed in the top 10 at the New Jersey; Boston; and the Washington, DC, regionals and awarded the 2010 "Industrial Design" Award and 2011, 2012 "NJ Best Website Award" and were semifinalists at the World Championship in St. Louis. As a Project Lead the Way High School, qualified students earn three college credits for successful completion of projects-based pre-engineering classes that teach fundamental problem-solving and critical-thinking skills. In 2011, RHS gained national recognition as an Exemplary Career and Technical Education (CTE) program by the National Association of State Directors of CTE for the implementation of PLTW and the FIRST Robotics Team.

In 2013 Nemesis won the Chairman's Award and also ranked first in the Mid-Atlantic. They finished the season as quarter-finalists in the Archimedes Division of the FIRST World Championship. In 2014 they went further to win first place in the Archimedes Division and then became Einstein Field semifinalists.

=== Theater department ===
During autumn, a dramatic play is performed. In the spring, the school performs a musical, and then a series of acts named the "Senior One Acts" where the seniors direct one-act plays with other students as performers & crew members. Students from the theatre department have also participated in a competition hosted by the Speech and Theatre Association of New Jersey, and the New Jersey State Thespian Festival. Other activities include an improvisation club as well as a drama club, and a competition of Shakespearean acts in the spring.

The Theatre Department has given many performances including:

- And Never Been Kissed (Fall 2004), Once Upon a Mattress (Spring 2005)
- A Midsummer Night's Dream (Fall 2005), Grease (Spring 2006)
- Pride and Prejudice (Fall 2006); Kiss Me, Kate (Spring 2007)
- Noises Off (Fall 2007), Back to the 80s (Spring 2008)
- The Laramie Project (Fall 2008), Joseph and the Amazing Technicolor Dreamcoat (Spring 2009)
- Romeo & Juliet (Fall 2009), Guys and Dolls (Spring 2010)
- The Adventures of Alice in Wonderland (Fall 2010), Copacabana (Spring 2011)
- Is He Dead? (Fall 2011), Thoroughly Modern Millie (Spring 2012)
- The Odyssey (Fall 2012), Nine to Five (Spring 2013)
- As You Like It (Fall 2013), Into the Woods (Spring 2014)
- You Can't Take It with You (Fall 2014), Legally Blonde (Spring 2015)
- A Murder Is Announced (Fall 2015), Seussical (Spring 2016)
- Peter and the Starcatcher (Fall 2016), Bring It On: The Musical (Spring 2017)
- Midsummer/Jersey (Fall 2017), The Drowsy Chaperone (Spring 2018)
- She Kills Monsters (Fall 2018), Disney's Beauty and the Beast (Spring 2019)
- The Crucible (Fall 2019), Guys and Dolls (Spring 2020)
- Romeo & Juliet (Fall 2020), Emma: A Pop Musical (Spring 2021)
- Puffs (Fall 2021), Mamma Mia! (Spring 2022)
- Heartwood (Fall 2022), Pippin (Spring 2023)
- Clue: On Stage (Fall 2023), Chicago (Spring 2024)
- Almost, Maine (Fall 2024); The Wedding Singer (Spring 2025)
- The Outsiders (Fall 2025); The Addams Family (musical) (Spring 2026)
- Romeo & Juliet (Fall 2026)

== Athletics ==
The Robbinsville High School Ravens compete in the Colonial Valley Conference, which is comprised of high schools located in Mercer County, Monmouth County and Middlesex County, and operates under the supervision of the New Jersey State Interscholastic Athletic Association (NJSIAA). With 740 students in grades 10–12, the school was classified by the NJSIAA for the 2019–20 school year as Group IV for most athletic competition purposes, which included schools with an enrollment of 486 to 758 students in that grade range. The football team competes in the Valley Division of the 94-team West Jersey Football League superconference and was classified by the NJSIAA as Group III South for football for 2024–2026, which included schools with 695 to 882 students.

The school participates as the host school / lead agency for joint cooperative ice hockey and boys' / girls' swimming teams with Allentown High School. These co-op programs operate under agreements scheduled to expire at the end of the 2023–24 school year.

Interscholastic sports offered at Robbinsville High School include:

- boys' and girls' tennis
- cross country
- cheerleading
- track
- football
- wrestling
- field hockey
- ice hockey
- boys' and girls' basketball
- baseball
- softball
- boys' and girls' soccer
- golf*
- swimming*
- boys' and girls' lacrosse
- boys' and girls' cheerleading

* The golf and swim teams were indefinitely discontinued in the 2025-2026 school year.

=== Baseball ===
In 2008, the baseball team turned a 2007 season total of two wins into a 16–14 record, a Group I Central Jersey sectional championship and a spot in the state final before losing to Lyndhurst High School in the tournament final. In 2009, the team advanced to the state tournament, but lost 9–7 to David Brearley High School. The 2010 team won a school-record 23 games and the program's second Central Jersey Group I sectional championship. The 2011 team went 25–4 and won their first-ever Mercer County Tournament championship, defeating Steinert High School for only the second time in school history (the first being earlier that season).

=== Cross country ===
The boys' cross country team qualified for the state finals in 2006 and 2007, and won the Group I state championship in 2009. The girls' cross country team was second in Central Jersey Group I and qualified for states in 2007 and 2009.

The girls won the Group I state title in 2008 with Megan Flynn as the individual Group I winner that season.

=== Field hockey ===
The girls' field hockey team qualified for the 2007 North II Group I tournament, ending their regular season with a record of 12–4, and placed as the #3 seed in the tournament. The field hockey team secured the 4th seed in the 2007 Mercer County Tournament, and advanced to the semi-finals before falling to Stuart Country Day School 2–1 in overtime, and advanced to the sectional semi-finals again in 2011.

=== Football ===
In 2007, the varsity football team finished the regular season with a 6–3 record and qualified for the NJSIAA playoffs, losing to Asbury Park High School, the eventual Group I Champions, by a 41–0 score in the first round of the Central Jersey, Group I tournament.

In 2019, the varsity football team won the West Jersey Football League division championship on the road against Haddon Township High School with a final score of 8–2, finishing the regular season undefeated at 9–0 for the first time.

=== Ice hockey ===
The boys' ice hockey team won the Patriot Division and went to the Mercer County quarterfinals, NJSIAA Public B first round as well as winning the Mercer County Tournament two years in a row (2023 and 2024).

=== Soccer ===
The girls' soccer team won the Group I state title in 2008 (defeating Waldwick High School in the championship game) and 2009 (vs. Cresskill High School). The girls' soccer team made it to the 2006 state playoff tournament for Central Jersey Group I, defeating Middlesex High School 2–1 in the first round, before falling to Metuchen High School by 2–0 in the semifinals.

The 2008 team won the Group I state title with a 3–0 win against Waldwick High School in the playoff finals.

The 2009 team finished the season with a record of 19–3–1 after defeating Cresskill by a score of 3–0 in the championship game, to become the first public school in two decades to win consecutive Group I titles.

The 2022 boys soccer team won the Group III state title, the program's first, by defeating West Morris Mendham High School in 4–2 in penalty kicks in the championship game, after ending regulation and overtime tied at 1–1.

=== Softball ===
The softball team has won state championships in Group II in 2011 (against runner-up Pequannock Township High School in the tournament final), 2013 (vs. Hanover Park High School), 2017 and 2018 (vs. Ramsey High School both years) and 2021 (vs. Verona High School); the program's five state titles are tied for eighth-most in the state.

The 2011 team won the Group II state championship with a 2–1 win against Pequannock Township High School in the final game of the tournament, capping off a season in which the team finished 24-0 and had won the Mercer County Tournament.

In 2013, the softball team won the NJSIAA Group II softball championship for the second time in three years. That year, the softball team became "the first from Mercer [County] to reach three straight state finals and the third from the county to win two state titles."

In 2017, the softball team won the Group II state championship, defeating previously unbeaten Ramsey High School by a score of 2–0 in the tournament final, to win the program's third state championship. The team advanced to the inaugural New Jersey State Interscholastic Athletic Association softball Tournament of Champions as the third seed, losing to sixth-seeded Group I champion Cedar Grove High School by a score of 2–1 in the first round.

The 2018 team repeated as Group II champion, defeating Ramsey for the second straight year by a score of 6–2 in the finals at Kean University and went into the Tournament of Champions as the second seed, falling to Immaculate Conception High School of Lodi in the semifinals by a score of 12–2 to finish the season at 26–2.

=== Swimming ===
In 2012, the girls' swim team earned the Patriot Division title. The RHS swim team is a co-ed team; however, in 2013 the team successfully gained enough members for separate-gender swim teams. The swim program was discontinued in the 2025-2026 school year.

=== Track and field ===
In 2008, the girls' track and field team won both the NJSIAA Group I Central Jersey sectional championship and the Group I state championship. The girls' team won the track and field Central Jersey Group I title for the third time in four years, and the boys also won the sectional championships in 2011. In 2009 the girls' team came in second in sectionals and in 2007 in third. In 2012 the girls' team won their division for the first time. In 2013 the girls' spring track team won the County Championship for the first time.

=== Wrestling ===
In 2010, the wrestling team won the Central Jersey Group I state sectional championship.

== Administration ==
The school's principal is Tom Brettell. His core administration team includes the two assistant principals.

== Notable alumni ==
- Samantha Josephson, murder victim
- Caedan Wallace (born 2000), football player (did not graduate; transferred to Hun School of Princeton after sophomore year)
