= Trenton tomato pie =

Type of Italian tomato pie

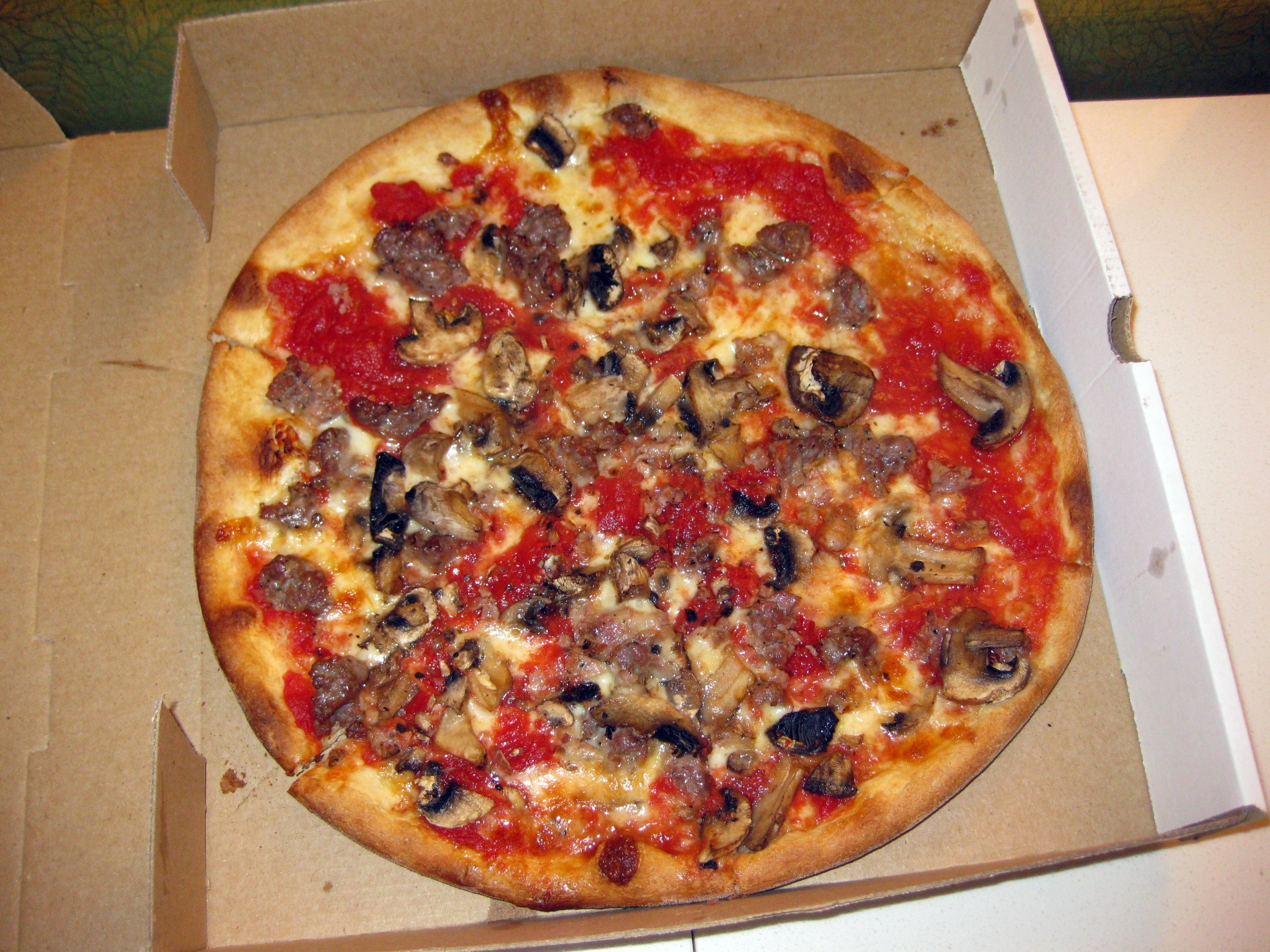
- Sausage and mushroom Trenton tomato pie
- Alternative names: New Jersey tomato pie
- Type: Pizza
- Place of origin: United States
- Region or state: Trenton, New Jersey
- Main ingredients: Pizza dough, tomato sauce, cheese

Trenton tomato pie or New Jersey tomato pie is a type of circular, thin-crust Italian tomato pie created in Trenton, New Jersey, United States, around the early 20th century in which cheese and other toppings are added on first, then the sauce.

== Preparation ==
The distinction between pizza and Trenton tomato pies is in the process of making the pie. Unlike the thicker square Italian tomato pie, Trenton tomato pie is often circular, of the thin-crust variety and includes cheese. In this style of tomato pie, the mozzarella and toppings are placed on the pie first followed by the tomato sauce placed on top.

== History ==
The first tomato pies in the United States were sold in New York City at Lombardi's which opened in 1905. Joe's Tomato Pie (now defunct), which opened in 1910, was the first Trenton-styled tomato pie. Papa's Tomato Pies, whose proprietor learned the trade at Joe's, was opened two years later in 1912.

The Trenton region is home to the two oldest currently operating New Jersey tomato pie restaurants in the United States, Papa's and De Lorenzo's. Trenton tomato pies have expanded across the region. In 1991, Palermo's opened in Bordentown, New Jersey. In September 2017, Classico Tomato Pies opened in West Windsor and won best Trenton tomato pie by the Bridgewater Courier News.

== See also ==
- Pizza in the United States
- Italian tomato pie
- Sicilian pizza
- List of tomato dishes
- Pizza
