= Robbinsville Center, New Jersey =

Populated place in Mercer County, New Jersey, US

- Census-designated place
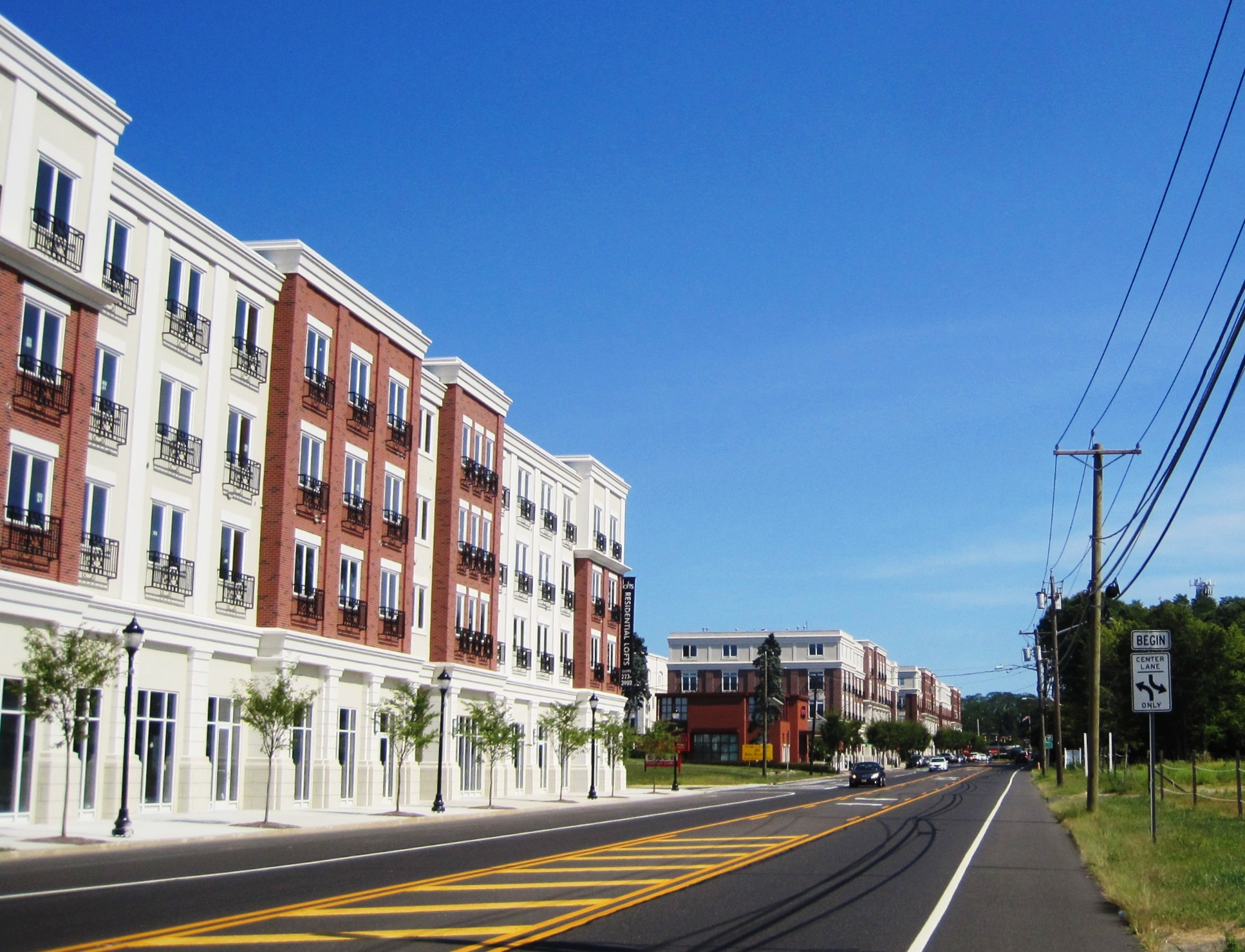
- Robbinsville Town Center

- Location in Mercer County and the state of New Jersey

- Location within Mercer County, New Jersey Location within New Jersey Location within the United States
- Coordinates: 40.219971°N 74.630225°W
- Country: United States
- State: New Jersey
- County: Mercer
- Township: Robbinsville

Area
  - Total: 0.658 sq mi (1.70 km^{2})
  - Land: 0.641 sq mi (1.66 km^{2})
  - Water: 0.017 sq mi (0.044 km^{2}) 2.58%
- Elevation: 108 ft (33 m)

Population (2020)
  - Total: 3,164
  - Density: 4,936/sq mi (1,906/km^{2})
- Time zone: UTC– 05:00 (Eastern (EST))
  - Summer (DST): UTC– 04:00 (EDT)
- ZIP Code: 08691 (Robbinsville)
- Area codes: 609/640 and 732/848
- FIPS code: 34-63858
- GNIS feature ID: 02612511

Robbinsville Center is a census-designated place (CDP) located within Robbinsville Township (known as Washington Township until 2007) in Mercer County, in the U.S. state of New Jersey. As of the 2020 census, it had a population of 3,164. Prior to 2020, the CDP was known as Robbinsville, with a population of 3,041 at the 2010 census. The area is served as United States Postal Service ZIP Code 08691.

The CDP includes the area of the township developed as a part of the Robbinsville Town Center. The CDP also includes the largely undeveloped land bordered by the Hamilton Township border, U.S. Route 130, and New Jersey Route 33, though there are some plans to develop this area as well.

== Geography ==
According to the U.S. Census Bureau, the CDP has a total area of 0.658 square miles (1.704 km^{2}), of which 0.641 square miles (1.660 km^{2}) are land and 0.017 square miles (0.044 km^{2}), or 2.58%, are water. The CDP occupies 3.1% of the total area of Robbinsville Township. The community sits on a low ridge which drains northeast to Miry Run, a northwest-flowing tributary of Assunpink Creek; and southwest to Edges Brook, a tributary of Back Creek which flows southwest to Crosswicks Creek. The entire community is within the Delaware River watershed.

== Demographics ==
Historical population
Census	Pop.	Note	%±
2010	3,041		—
2020	3,164		4.0%
U.S. Decennial Census; 2010 2020

The community first appeared as a census designated place under the name Robbinsville in the 2010 U.S. census.

=== Racial and ethnic composition ===
Robbinsville Center CDP, New Jersey – Racial and ethnic composition Note: the US Census treats Hispanic/Latino as an ethnic category. This table excludes Latinos from the racial categories and assigns them to a separate category. Hispanics/Latinos may be of any race.
Race / Ethnicity (NH = Non-Hispanic)	Pop 2010	Pop 2020	% 2010	% 2020
White alone (NH)	2,120	1,719	69.71%	54.33%
Black or African American alone (NH)	88	112	2.89%	3.54%
Native American or Alaska Native alone (NH)	4	2	0.13%	0.06%
Asian alone (NH)	635	1,063	20.88%	33.60%
Native Hawaiian or Pacific Islander alone (NH)	0	0	0.00%	0.00%
Other race alone (NH)	3	18	0.10%	0.57%
Mixed race or Multiracial (NH)	64	91	2.10%	2.88%
Hispanic or Latino (any race)	127	159	4.18%	5.03%
Total	3,041	3,164	100.00%	100.00%

=== 2020 census ===
As of the 2020 census, Robbinsville Center had a population of 3,164. The median age was 41.2 years. 27.0% of residents were under the age of 18 and 10.9% of residents were 65 years of age or older. For every 100 females there were 87.9 males, and for every 100 females age 18 and over there were 83.1 males age 18 and over.

100.0% of residents lived in urban areas, while 0.0% lived in rural areas.

There were 1,270 households in Robbinsville Center, of which 44.4% had children under the age of 18 living in them. Of all households, 53.1% were married-couple households, 14.3% were households with a male householder and no spouse or partner present, and 28.7% were households with a female householder and no spouse or partner present. About 28.9% of all households were made up of individuals and 11.9% had someone living alone who was 65 years of age or older.

There were 1,342 housing units, of which 5.4% were vacant. The homeowner vacancy rate was 0.2% and the rental vacancy rate was 9.1%.

=== 2010 census ===
The 2010 United States census counted 3,041 people, 1,237 households, and 756 families in what was then known as the Robbinsville CDP. The population density was 4,016.0 per square mile (1,550.6/km^{2}). There were 1,325 housing units at an average density of 1,749.8 per square mile (675.6/km^{2}). The racial makeup was 73.13% (2,224) White, 3.06% (93) Black or African American, 0.13% (4) Native American, 20.91% (636) Asian, 0.00% (0) Pacific Islander, 0.36% (11) from other races, and 2.40% (73) from two or more races. Hispanic or Latino of any race were 4.18% (127) of the population.

Of the 1,237 households, 37.7% had children under the age of 18; 51.8% were married couples living together; 6.5% had a female householder with no husband present and 38.9% were non-families. Of all households, 34.1% were made up of individuals and 14.2% had someone living alone who was 65 years of age or older. The average household size was 2.41 and the average family size was 3.18.

26.7% of the population were under the age of 18, 2.7% from 18 to 24, 37.2% from 25 to 44, 21.2% from 45 to 64, and 12.2% who were 65 years of age or older. The median age was 37.1 years. For every 100 females, the population had 83.1 males. For every 100 females ages 18 and older there were 78.3 males.

== Education ==
The school district covering the CDP is Robbinsville Township School District.
