= Lawrence Township Public Schools =

School district in Mercer County, New Jersey, US

Address
- 2565 Princeton Pike Lawrenceville, Mercer County, New Jersey, 08648; United States
- Coordinates: 40.266668°N 74.728126°W

District information
- Grades: Pre-K to 12
- Superintendent: Ross Kasun
- Business administrator: Tom Eldridge
- Schools: 7

Students and staff
- Enrollment: 3,707 (as of 2020–21)
- Faculty: NA FTEs
- Student–teacher ratio: NA:1

Other information
- District Factor Group: GH
- Website: www.ltps.org
| Ind. | Per pupil | District spending | Rank (*) | K-12 average | %± vs. average |
|---|---|---|---|---|---|
| 1A | Total Spending | $18,576 | 50 | $18,891 | −1.7% |
| 1 | Budgetary Cost | 14,557 | 52 | 14,783 | −1.5% |
| 2 | Classroom Instruction | 8,463 | 41 | 8,763 | −3.4% |
| 6 | Support Services | 2,690 | 79 | 2,392 | 12.5% |
| 8 | Administrative Cost | 1,257 | 22 | 1,485 | −15.4% |
| 10 | Operations & Maintenance | 1,834 | 70 | 1,783 | 2.9% |
| 13 | Extracurricular Activities | 255 | 55 | 268 | −4.9% |
| 16 | Median Teacher Salary | 63,001 | 39 | 64,043 |
Data from NJDoE 2014 Taxpayers' Guide to Education Spending. *Of K-12 districts with more than 3,500 students. Lowest spending=1; Highest=103

The Lawrence Township Public Schools is a comprehensive community public school district that serves students in pre-kindergarten through twelfth grade from Lawrence Township, in Mercer County, in the U.S. state of New Jersey.

As of the 2020–21 school year, the district, comprising seven schools, had an enrollment of 3,707 students and NA classroom teachers (on an FTE basis), for a student–teacher ratio of NA:1.

The district is classified by the New Jersey Department of Education as being in District Factor Group "GH", the third-highest of eight groupings. District Factor Groups organize districts statewide to allow comparison by common socioeconomic characteristics of the local districts. From lowest socioeconomic status to highest, the categories are A, B, CD, DE, FG, GH, I and J.

Students from Robbinsville Township (known as Washington Township until 2007) had attended Lawrence High School as part of a sending/receiving relationship that ended following the opening of Robbinsville High School, with the final group of Robbinsville seniors graduating in the 2006–07 school year.

== Awards and recognition ==
For the 1999–2000 school year, Lawrence Middle School was named a "Star School" by the New Jersey Department of Education, the highest honor that a New Jersey school can achieve.

Lawrence Township Public Schools have been consistently named one of the "Best Communities for Music Education" in the nation by the NAMM Foundation since 2005.

== Schools ==
Schools in the district (with 2020–21 enrollment data from the National Center for Education Statistics) are:

Elementary schools

- Eldridge Park Elementary School with 203 students in grades K-3
  - Amy E. Amiet, principal
- Ben Franklin Elementary School with NA students in grades PreK-3
  - Geoffrey Hewitt, principal
- Lawrenceville Elementary School with 286 students in grades PreK-3
  - Kristin Burke, principal
- Slackwood Elementary School with 219 students in grades K-3
  - Ebony Lattimer, principal
- Lawrence Intermediate School with 807 students in grades 4-6
  - Sharin Rello, principal

Middle school

- Lawrence Middle School with 603 students in grades 7-8
  - Mindy Milavsky, principal

High school

- Lawrence High School with 1,167 students in grades 9-12
  - David J. Adam, principal

== Administration ==
Core members of the district's administration are:

- Ross Kasun, superintendent of schools
- Tom Eldridge, business administrator and board secretary

== Board of education ==
The district's board of education is comprised of nine members who set policy and oversee the fiscal and educational operation of the district through its administration. As a Type II school district, the board's trustees are elected directly by voters to serve three-year terms of office on a staggered basis, with three seats up for election each year held (since 2013) as part of the November general election. The board appoints a superintendent to oversee the district's day-to-day operations and a business administrator to supervise the business functions of the district.
