= Green tomato pie =

Sweet pie made with green tomatoes

Green tomato pie is a pie in American cuisine that can be made like other fruit pies by sprinkling sugar, flour, cinnamon and other spices or raisins over sliced tomatoes and pieces of butter, or by simply cooking the ingredients on the stovetop before baking in a pastry-lined dish.

Green tomato pie was commonly made as a mock apple pie or mock mincemeat pie in the 19th century. When cinnamon and cloves are added to the filling, the unripe tomatoes are said to resemble tart apples or rhubarb. The mincemeat variation is made by cooking green tomatoes with sugar and apples, vinegar, raisins and spices until thickened; this sweet pie is said to be indistinguishable in flavor from traditional mincemeat pie. Some versions add orange peel, jelly, fruit juice or butter.

The pastry for the pie crust may be made with bacon drippings.

== History ==
Green tomato pies, and cooking with underripe green tomatoes in general, were more common in 19th-century American cooking than they are in the present day, and this sweet pie is less common than the savoury southern tomato pie. The cookbook Buckeye Cookery (1877) has a recipe for a basic green tomato pie and a similar recipe is found in the White House Cook Book (1887).

19th-century recipes for green tomato pie were made similar to apple pie, with sliced tomatoes and sugar baked in a pastry crust, sometimes with water, flour, molasses, cinnamon and lemon zest or vinegar added. Green tomatoes were a common substitute for apples during the summer in the 19th century, and are more consistent in tartness and texture than apples.
