= Southern tomato pie =

Pie from the Southern United States

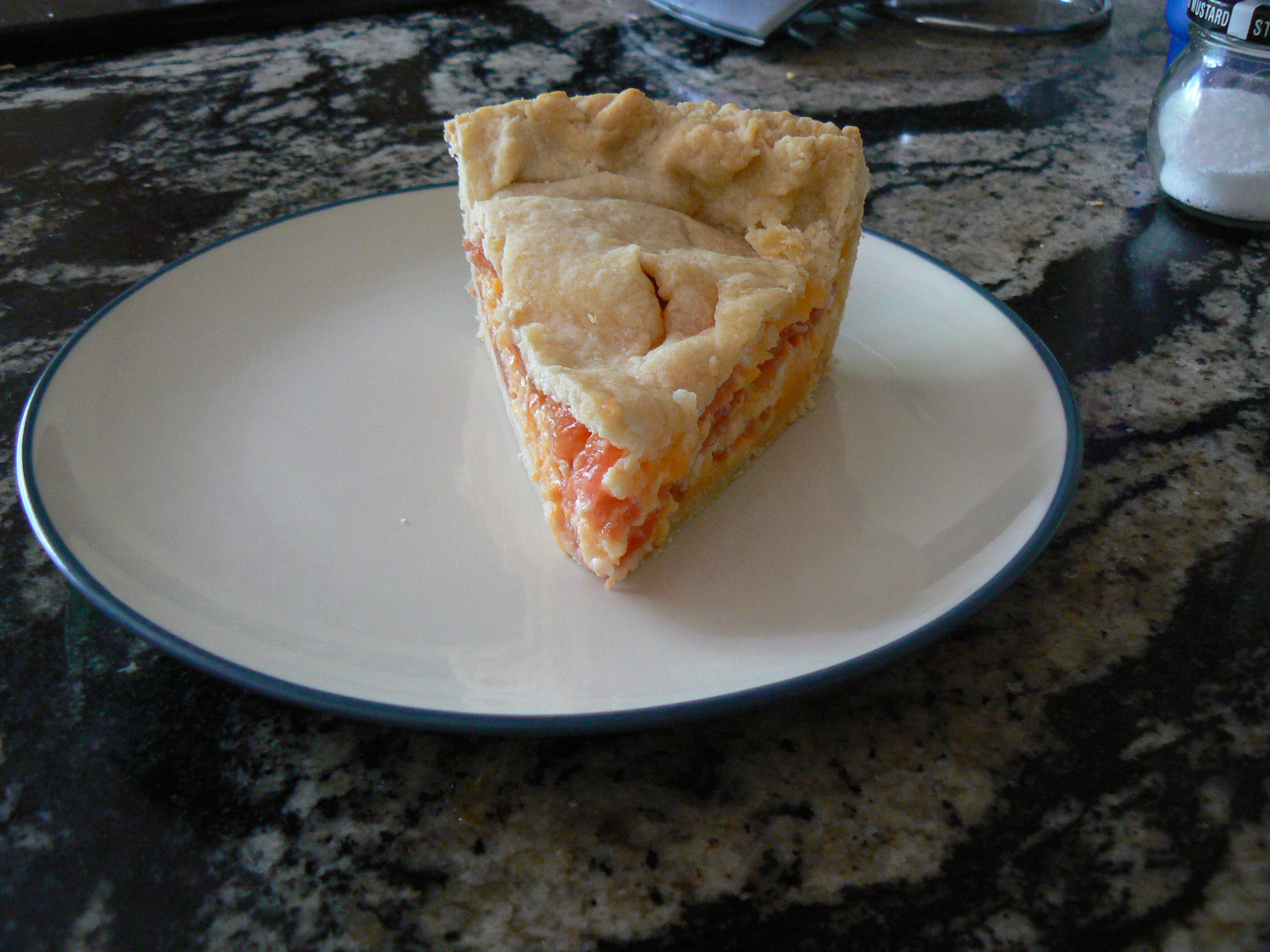
A slice of Southern tomato pie

The Southern tomato pie is a tomato dish from the Southern United States. It consists of a pie shell with a filling of tomatoes (sometimes with basil or other herbs), covered with a topping of grated cheese mixed with either mayonnaise or a white sauce. It is considered a summer dish, to be made when tomatoes are in season.

A sweet version called green tomato pie uses buttered and sugared green tomatoes, with a recipe dating at least as far back as 1877. The taste has been compared to that of green apple pie. The sweet version is less common than the savory Southern tomato pie.

== See also ==
- List of pies, tarts and flans
- List of tomato dishes
- Pie in American cuisine
- Pizza
