= Thin-crust pizza =

Thin-crust pizza may refer to any pizza baked with especially thin or flattened dough, and, in particular, these types of pizza in the United States:

- Tavern-style pizza, sometimes known by combinations of some or all the words "Chicago," "tavern," "style," and "thin crust," or these related styles:
  - St. Louis-style pizza
  - Minnesota-style pizza
  - Columbus-style pizza
- New Haven-style pizza
- New Jersey thin-crust pizza
- New York-style pizza
