= Pizza in the United States =

American cuisine variety

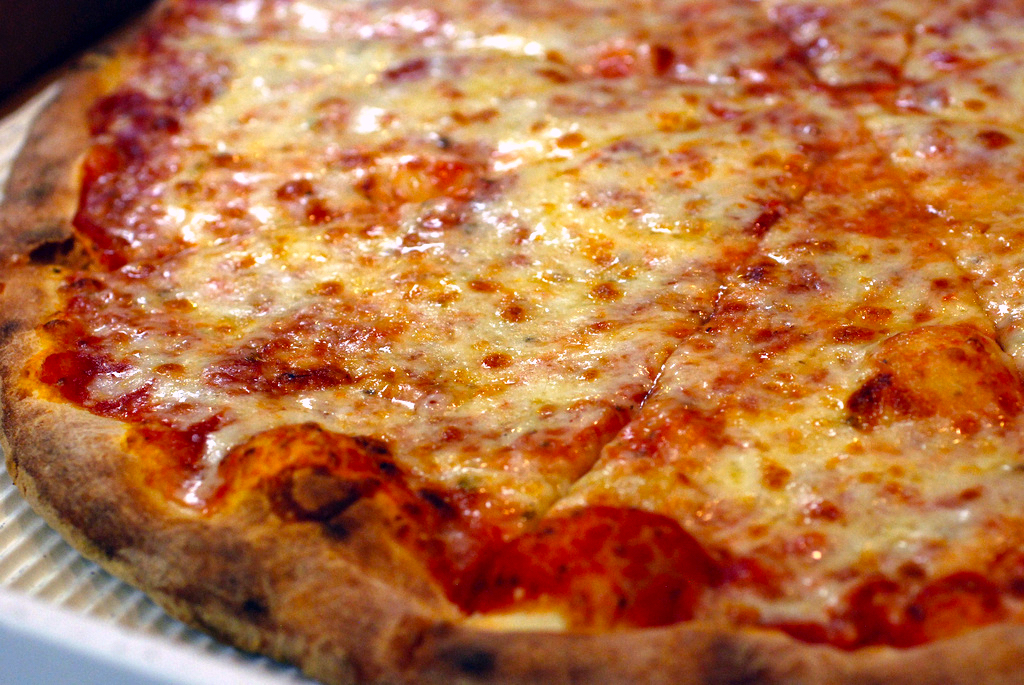
New York–style pizza, the original pizza in the United States

Pizza was introduced to the United States in the 1890s along with waves of Italian immigrants who settled primarily in the larger cities of the Northeast, such as New York, Philadelphia, Boston, New Jersey, New Haven and Baltimore. Pizza and pizzerias rapidly grew in popularity in the late 1940s.

During the latter half of the 20th century, pizza became an iconic food with considerable acceptance in the United States. Numerous regional variations have evolved, with many bearing only a casual resemblance to the Italian original. Pizza is a popular item produced by many small restaurants as well as several large pizza restaurant chains. The United States pizza restaurant industry was worth $37 billion in 2015.

== History ==
Pizzerias in the U.S. opened in New York City's Little Italy in 1894, 1903, and 1905, producing a Neapolitan-style pizza. Other early locations included San Francisco, Trenton, Boston, Baltimore, and New Haven, Connecticut.

The word pizza was borrowed into English in the 1930s; before it became well known, pizza was generally called "tomato pie" by English speakers. Some regional pizza variations still use the name tomato pie.

Distinct regional types developed in the 20th century, including Buffalo, California, Chicago, Detroit, Greek, New Haven, New York, and St. Louis styles.

Thirteen percent of the United States population consumes pizza on any given day.

== Ingredients ==
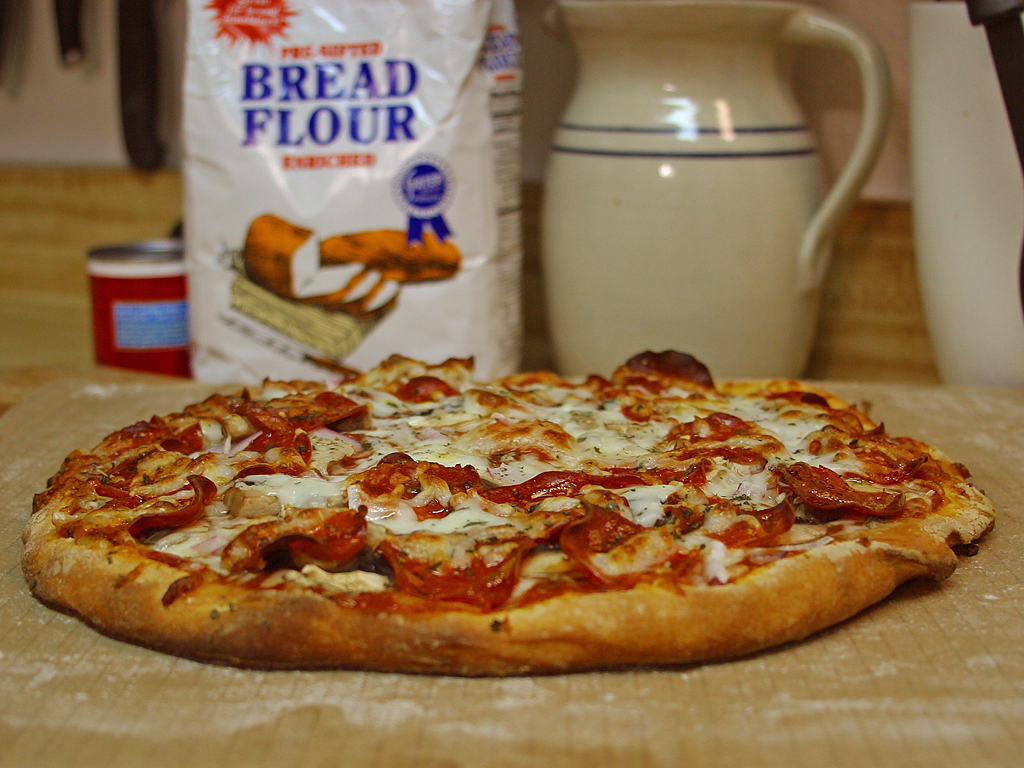
Pepperoni is the most popular topping for pizza in the United States.

American pizza (particularly thin-crust) is made with a very high-gluten flour (often 13–14% protein content) of the type also used to make bagels; this allows the dough to be stretched thinly and thrown vigorously without tearing. Unlike Italian pizza, American pizza often has vegetable oil or shortening mixed into the dough. This can range from a small amount in relatively lean doughs, such as New York–style, to a very large amount in some recipes for Chicago-style deep-dish dough.

The most common cheese used on US pizzas is mozzarella. Other popular cheeses include parmesan, provolone, romano, and ricotta.

== Variations ==
- Altoona-style pizza is a distinct type of pizza created in the city of Altoona, Pennsylvania, by the Altoona Hotel. The definitive characteristics of Altoona-style pizza are a Sicilian-style pizza dough, tomato sauce, sliced green bell pepper, salami, topped with American cheese, and pizzas cut into squares instead of wedges.
- Beach pizza from New England beach communities is known for its thin crust, sweet tomato sauce, and shredded mozzarella cheese or sliced provolone.
- Brier Hill-style pizza from Youngstown, Ohio, is characterized by a thick sauce, bell peppers and Pecorino Romano cheese.
- Buffalo-style pizza from Buffalo, New York, is known for its thick, chewy crust, sweet tomato sauce, cup-and-char pepperoni, and square-cut slices.
- California-style pizza is distinguished by the use of non-traditional ingredients, especially varieties of fresh produce. Some typical California-style toppings include Thai-inspired chicken pizza with peanut sauce, bean sprouts, and shaved carrots, taco pizzas, and pizzas with chicken and barbecue sauce as toppings.

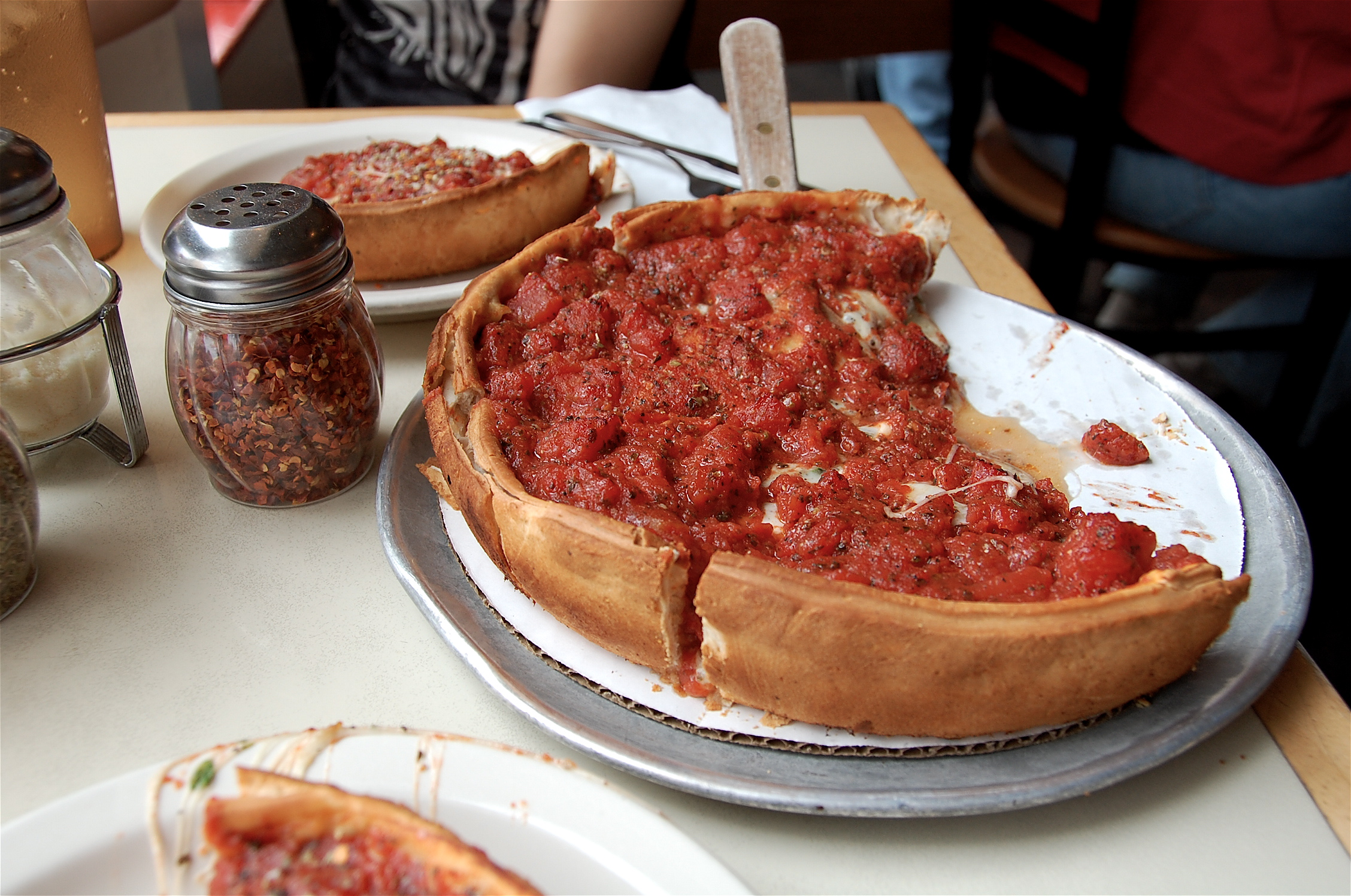
Chicago-style deep-dish pizza

- Chicago-style pizza is distinguished by a thick moist crust formed up the sides of a deep-dish pan and sauce as the last ingredient, added atop the cheese and toppings. Stuffed versions have two layers of crust with the sauce on top.
- Colorado-style pizza is distinguished by a thick braided, whole-wheat crust topped with a sweet tomato sauce and heavy toppings. It is traditionally served by the pound with a side of honey.
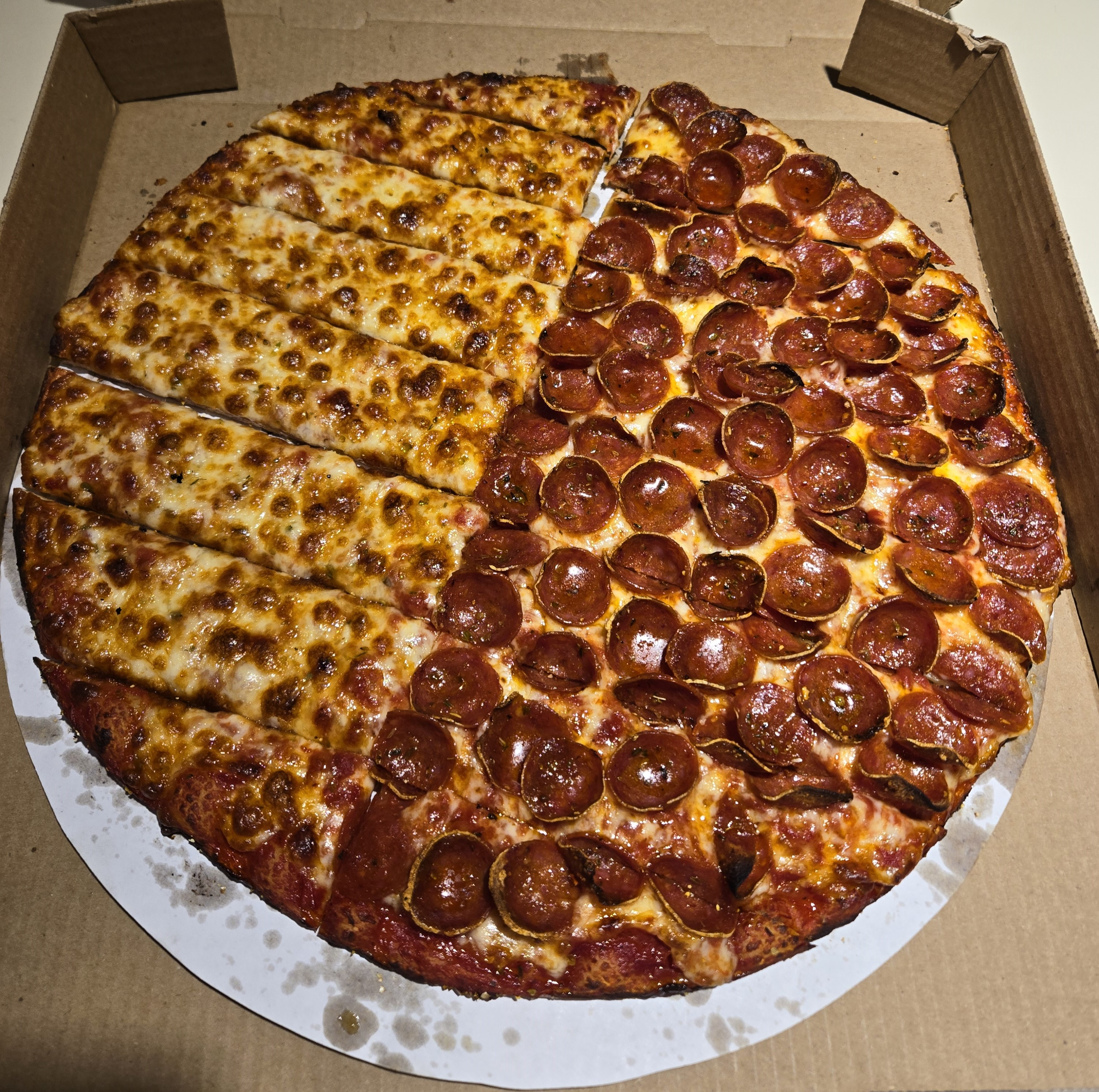
- Columbus-style pizza
  Columbus-style pizza has a circular shape, pieces cut into short or long rectangles, thin but crispy or bubbly crust, dense toppings that cover the surface, and, usually, provolone cheese and a slightly sweet sauce.
- Dayton-style pizza has a thin, crisp, salty crust dusted on the bottom with cornmeal and topped with a thin layer of thick unsweetened sauce. Cheese and other topping ingredients are heavily distributed and spread edge-to-edge with no outer rim of crust, and the finished pizza is cut into bite-size squares.

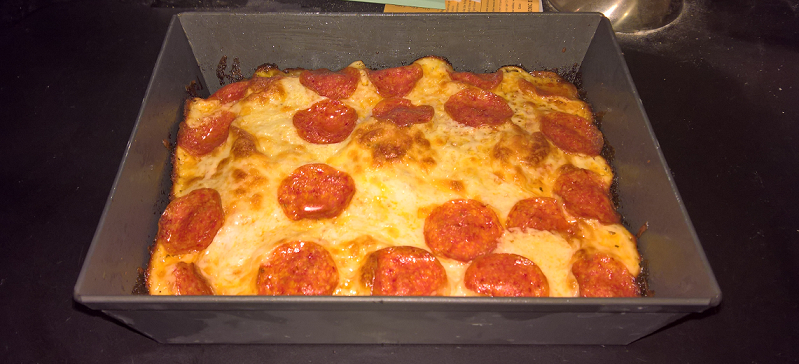
Detroit-style pizza

- Detroit-style pizza is a rectangular pan pizza with a thick crust that is crispy and chewy. It is traditionally topped with Wisconsin brick cheese that goes all the way to the edges and caramelizes against the high-sided heavyweight rectangular pan. This style of pizza was originally baked in rectangular steel trays designed for use as automotive drip pans or to hold small industrial parts in factories.
- Grandma pizza is a thin, square pizza, typically with cheese and tomatoes. It is reminiscent of pizzas baked at home by Italian housewives without a pizza oven, and was popularized on Long Island.
- Greek pizza is a variation popular in New England; its name comes from it being typical of the style of pizzerias owned by Greek immigrants. It has a thick, chewy crust and is baked in a pan in the pizza oven, instead of directly on the bricks. Plain olive oil is a common part of the topping, as well as being liberally used to grease the pans and crisp the crust. A significantly different variation in other parts of the country includes using feta cheese, Kalamata olives, and Greek herbs such as oregano.
- Maryland-style pizza is a rectangular pie with biscuity crust, sweet tomato sauce, and smoked provolone.
- Minneapolis-style pizza or Minnesota-style pizza is a circular thin-crust pizza, cut into squares, with spicy sauce, and hearty toppings. It is popular in the Twin Cities metropolitan area.
- New Haven–style pizza has a thin crust that varies between chewy and tender (depending on where it is made), baked in coal-fired brick ovens till charred, offset by the sweetness of tomatoes and other toppings. Also known as "apizza" (pronounced as "ah-beets" in the local dialect), it has tomato sauce and only grated Pecorino Romano cheese; mozzarella is considered a topping.
- New Jersey thin-crust pizza is a distinct style prevalent in Central and Northern New Jersey. Characterized by an extremely thin crust, it is cooked partially or entirely in a shallow pan or deck oven. It is commonly served in local bars and taverns in individual sizes, though larger sizes up to 18 inches are found in some taverns.

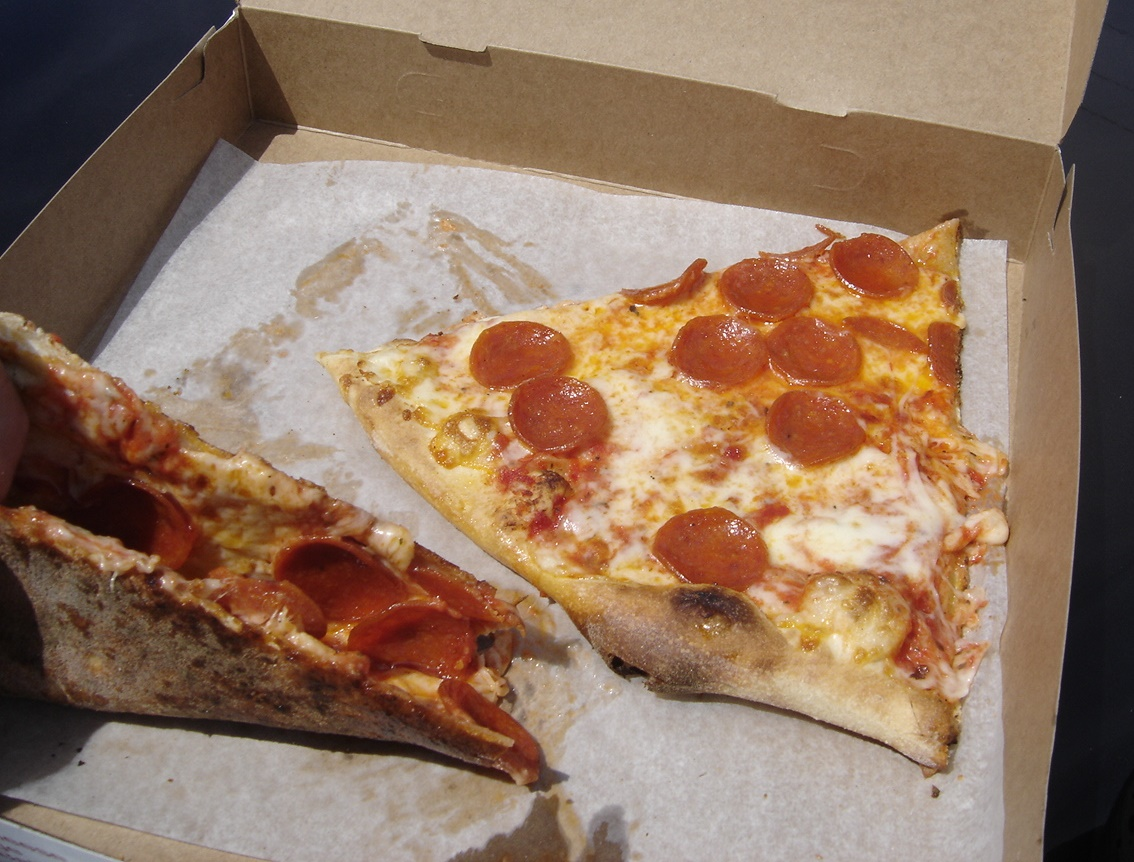
New York–style pizza with its characteristic thin foldable crust

- New York–style pizza is a Neapolitan-style thin-crust pizza developed in New York City by immigrants from Naples, Italy, where pizza was created. It is traditionally hand-tossed, moderately topped with southern Italian-style marinara sauce, and liberally covered with mozzarella cheese. It is often sold in generously sized, thin, and flexible slices, typically folded in half to eat. This style of pizza tends to dominate the Northeastern states and is particularly popular in New York, New Jersey, and Connecticut. Jumbo slices of a similar pie are particularly popular in Washington, D.C.
- Ohio Valley–style pizza is pizza that was developed in Steubenville, Ohio, and has made its way up the Ohio River to Pittsburgh, Pennsylvania. It uses a square pizza dough that rises thick but maintains a light consistency. The crust and bottom are crunchy. The sauce on this style of pizza is either savory or sweet, depending upon individual recipe and the pizza is baked without toppings. Immediately after being removed from the oven cold toppings are put on the hot pizza, including the cheese, in prodigious amounts. Most of the cheese melts, but not all. The other toppings used remain cold on top of the cheese.
- Pan pizza is a deep-dish style like Chicago and Detroit styles. A variation of moderate thickness was popularized by Pizza Hut.

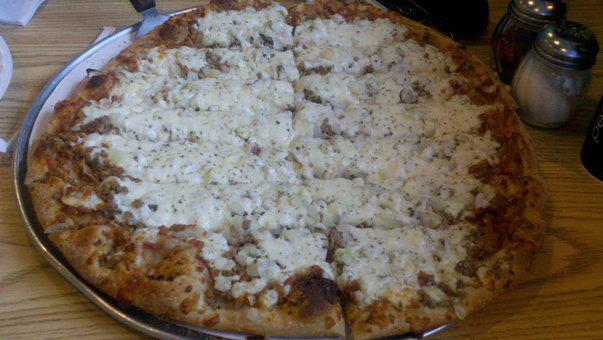
An example of Quad City-style pizza

- Quad City–style pizza is a pizza style developed in the Quad Cities metro area on the Illinois–Iowa border. It features a thin dough that incorporates seasoning that is heavy on malt, lending a toasted, nutty flavor. The smooth, thin sauce contains both red chili flakes and ground cayenne, and is more spicy than sweet. It is topped heavily with lean, fennel-flecked Italian sausage that is ground twice and spread in crumbles from edge to edge.
- Richmond-style pizza is a thick sourdough crust pizza with exotic toppings. It originated at Bottoms Up Pizza in Shockoe Bottom. Richmond style pizza is known for its exotic toppings like Bottoms Up Chesapeake Pizza that features real crab meat and old bay.
- Sheet pizza, also known as Roman pizza, is any thin-crust style baked on a baking sheet. It is typically rectangular (like the sheet) and served for events with a large number of people.
- South Shore Bar pizza is distinguished by a thin crust, almost cracker-like, and is baked, or at least partly baked, in a shallow pan for an oily crust. Cheese covers the entire pizza, including the crust, leaving a crispy edge where the cheese meets the pan or oven surface. Bar pizzas are usually served in a bar or pub and are usually small in size (around 10" in diameter). This style of pizza is popular in the Boston area, particularly the South Shore.

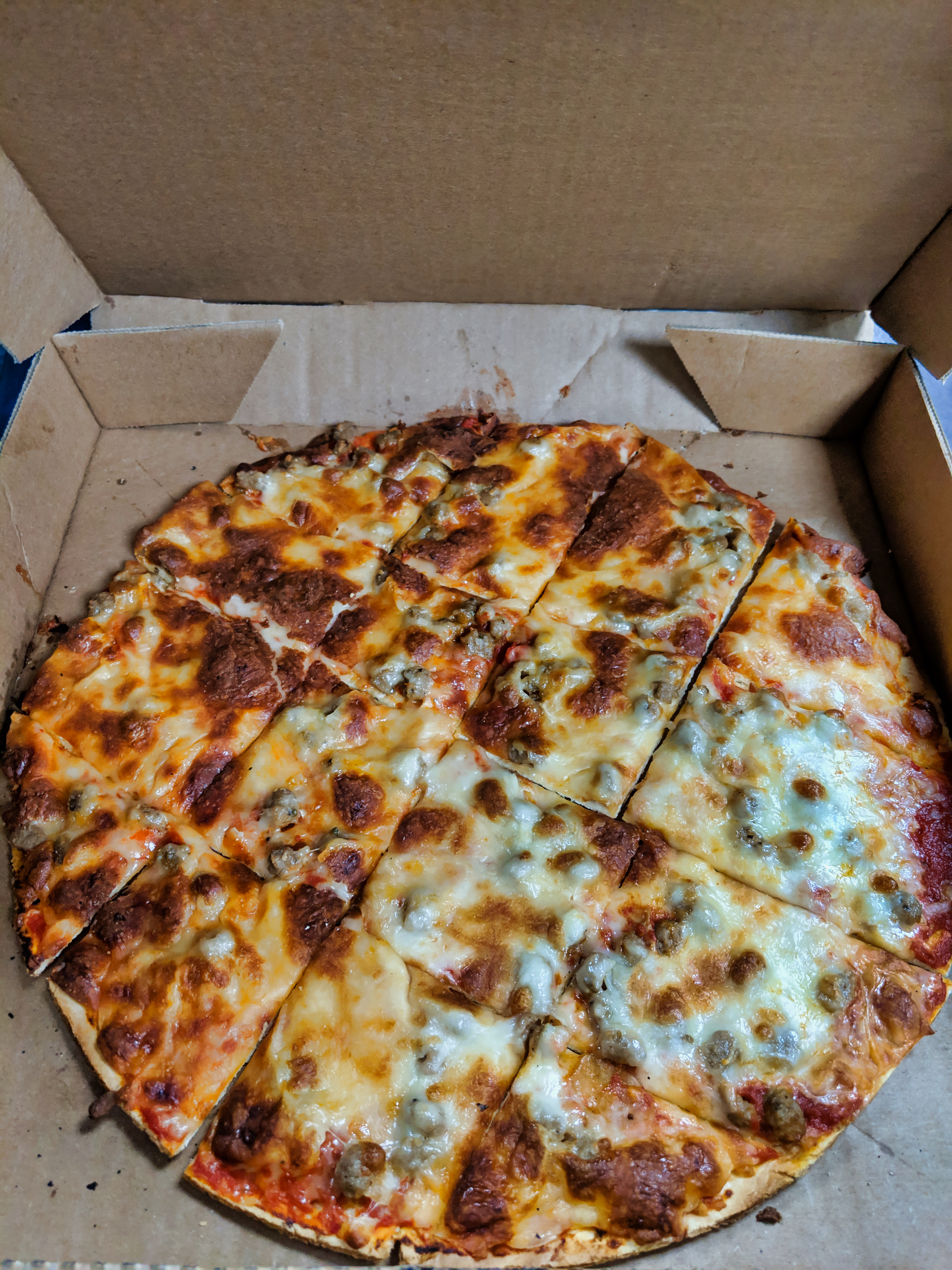
St. Louis–style pizza

- St. Louis–style pizza is a variant of thin-crust pizza popular around St. Louis and southern Illinois notable for its use of distinctive Provel cheese instead of (or, rarely, in addition to) mozzarella. Its crust is thin enough to become very crunchy in the oven, sometimes being compared to a cracker, and toppings are usually sliced instead of diced. Although round, St. Louis-style pies are always cut into small squares.
- Italian tomato pie is a square-cut thick-crust pizza topped with chunky tomato sauce and sprinkled with pecorino romano cheese, very similar to Sicilian sfinciuni. Also known as party pizza, pizza strips, gravy pie, church pie, red bread, strip pizza, and bakery pizza. Popular in several areas around the Northeast, especially Rhode Island, Philadelphia and Utica, New York.
- Trenton tomato pie or New Jersey tomato pie is a circular thin-crust pizza where the cheese and toppings are placed before the sauce. Named after Trenton, New Jersey.

== See also ==
Media related to Pizzas in the United States at Wikimedia Commons

- Italian-American cuisine
- List of pizza varieties by country
- Mexican Pizza – created by the U.S.-based chain Taco Bell
