= Cassano's Pizza King =

American pizzeria chain

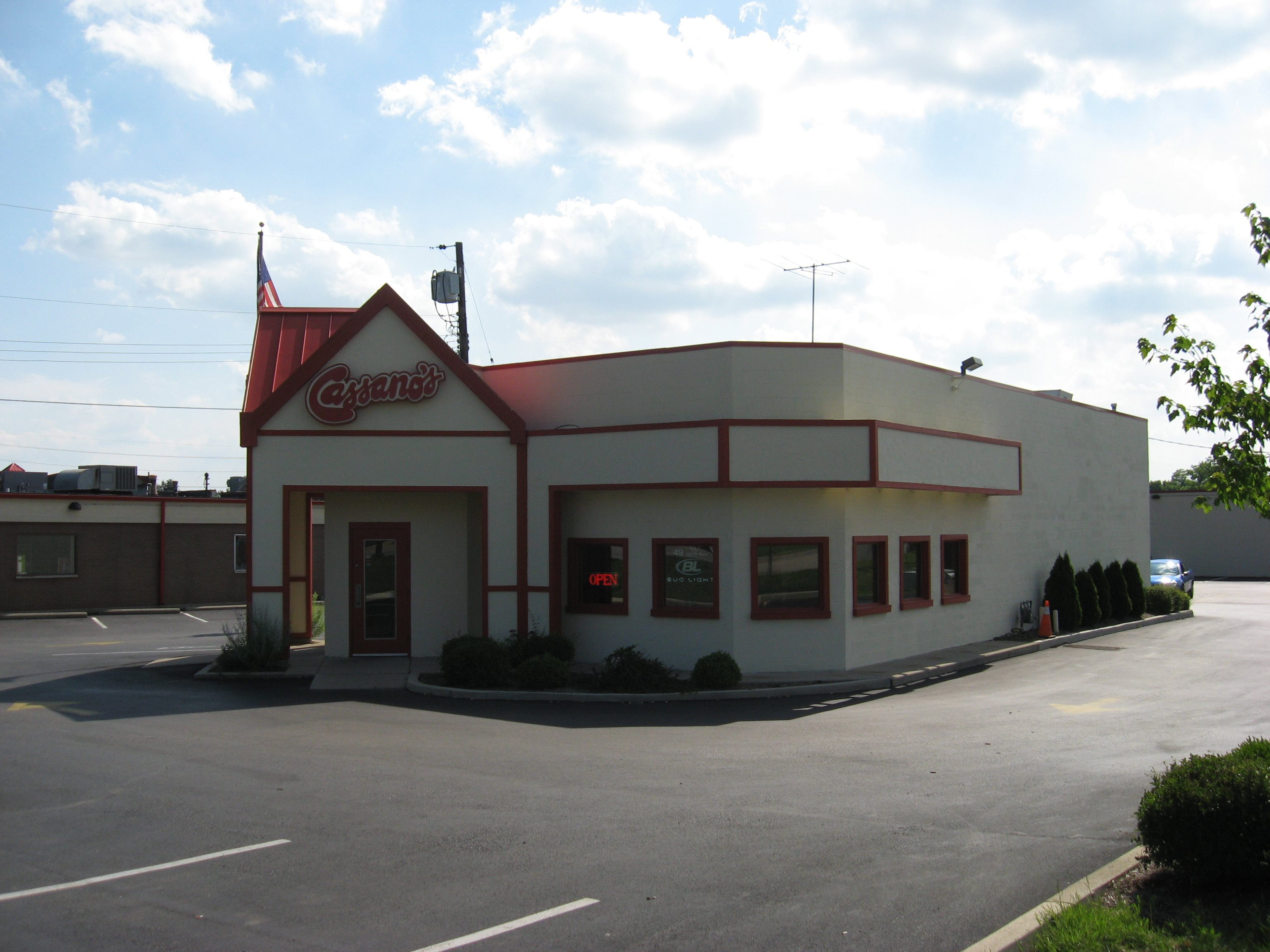
- Former Cassano's location in Springboro, Ohio
- Type: Private
- Industry: Food wholesale
- Founded: Dayton, Ohio, USA (June 4, 1953; 73 years ago)
- Headquarters: Dayton, Ohio, USA
- Key people: Vic Cassano, Sr. (Co-founder, d. 2002), Vic Cassano Jr. (d. 2010)
- Products: Pizza, Subs, Salads
- Website: www.cassanos.com

Cassano's Pizza King, currently [when?] operating under the brand Cassano's, is a pizzeria chain based in Dayton, Ohio, which produces Dayton-style pizza. Established on June 4, 1953, by the grocer Victor "Vic" J. Cassano, Sr. (June 4, 1922 – January 1, 2002) and his mother-in-law Caroline "Mom" Donisi, the company currently (2005) operates 34 Cassano's Pizza King restaurants in the Dayton area, and has three other western Ohio franchises (in Russells Point, Fairfield and Sidney), plus a franchise in Quincy, Illinois, and another in Hannibal, Missouri. The company also operates dozens of Cassano's Pizza Express kiosks in gas stations, convenience stores and hotels, and sells frozen pizza dough under the name Cassano's Fresh Frozen Dough Company.

From the mid-1980s to 1997, the chain operated under the name Cassano's Pizza and Subs, and this branding is still present (as of 2007) on signage and menus at some locations.

In the mid-1970s, Cassano's was ranked by the National Restaurant Association as one of the top four pizza chains in the United States.

In 2016, Cassano's Pizza King, Ohio Historical Marker, was designated by the Ohio History Connection at Kettering, Ohio.

== Fare ==
Cassano's traditional pizza, "Dayton Style Pizza" shares similar characteristics with St. Louis-style pizza and tavern-style pizza; it is characterized by its unusually salty, crispy, distinctively flavored thin crust, and is typically cut into small rectangular pieces rather than wedges (party cut instead of pie cut). This style of pizza is also characteristic of Cassano's local rival, Marion's Piazza, also based in Dayton which is adjacent to Cassano's base.

== Expansion and downsizing ==
Cassano's franchises have also previously operated in Pennsylvania, Kentucky, Indiana, West Virginia, Michigan, and other U.S. states. The chain had grown to over 100 locations when it was sold to Vic Cassano, Jr. (March 19, 1945 – May 28, 2010), who subsequently sold the company to Greyhound Food Management, Inc. (a subsidiary of Greyhound) in 1986. At the time, the chain had 48 locations, but Greyhound planned a massive expansion, with 100 to 150 new restaurants planned each year in order to compete with Domino's Pizza. Over an 18-month period, Greyhound briefly opened 33 delivery-only restaurants, using Columbus, Ohio, as a test market. However, the more-expensive Cassano's pizza, which competed well against dine-in restaurants, was too high-priced for the delivery-only market and could not compete against Domino's. Greyhound changed classic menu items and failed to deliver on its promises to refurbish older Cassano's stores and inject fresh capital into marketing. The planned expansion did not occur beyond Columbus, and the then-chairman of Greyhound, John Teats, ordered every new Cassano's unit to be closed on the same day.

In 1989, Cassano Jr. and Greyhound executive Randy Leasher repurchased the company. Acting on "bad advice", the pair continued to have difficulty with the company. In 1995, the company had 43 restaurants, 13 franchises and 563 employees. Cassano's filed for Chapter 11 bankruptcy protection that year. The company's wholesale dough business, which started in 1994, brought Cassano's $3 million in 1998, and Cassano's Pizza Express operations was launched in 1999, but overall business continued to decline, with only 29 restaurants remaining in January 1999.

In May 2000, Leasher resigned as company president without explanation. Pizza Marketplace later reported the Leasher had been forced out after Cassano Jr. learned Leasher had written a $90,000 company check to himself. In October 2000, following an investigation by the Kettering Police Department (at Cassano Jr.'s behest) and county prosecutors, Leasher pleaded guilty to two charges related to the embezzlement of $700,000 from the company.

Determined to reaffirm the company in Dayton and turn Cassano's around, Cassano Jr. obtained assistance from Mark Heistand, a turnaround consultant at Financial Resource Associates Inc. (KY), and the Tri-State Association for Corporate Renewal (TACR), a nonprofit organization that offers information and assistance to companies involved in crisis situations. In their first year of collaboration, Heistand and Cassano Jr. negotiated with vendors who were owed thousands of dollars, paid off overdue rent, and made cash flow equal to receipts.

More locations had to be closed; only 27 full-service locations remained by mid-2001, at which point the chain began to expand again, growing to 29 restaurants at the end of 2001, 33 by August 2002, and 38 by July 2003. Although the company reported a 28 percent increase in orders for its traditional pizzas between March 2003 and March 2004, and an overall 20 percent-per-year increase in business in the first three years of regrouping, the number of restaurants had dropped to 34 by July 2004.

== New growth ==
A $1 million, 2,000-square-foot (190 m^{2}) call center was created at the company's headquarters in 2004 in order to provide the public with a single phone number through which to order pizza. The call center, one of only six pizzeria chain call centers in the United States, is attributed to a 20 percent growth in Cassano's business in its first year of operation. At the time of its opening, Vic Cassano Jr. stated his intention to renovate or relocate every store, and to provide delivery service to the 10 to 15 percent of Dayton-area homes not yet covered.

In 2005, one new restaurant opened, and total sales increased by "double digits", according to Vic Cassano Jr.

In 2006, plans were announced to open four new pizzerias in the Dayton-area suburbs Englewood and Huber Heights, and nearby cities Brookville and Wilmington. It was also announced that the West Carrollton store would be "rebuilt".

In 2007, the chain had 33 locations, and Cassano Jr. announced plans to spend $1 million on machines to upgrade the company's dough operation. Also announced was the intention to add two new stores in the Dayton suburbs of Moraine and Englewood, and to move an existing Englewood store to a new location. Plans for 2008 included replacing the Smithville Road pizzeria and building another store elsewhere.

Vic Cassano Jr. died on May 28, 2010, at age 65.

In 2010, several restaurants in the chain were relocated or renovated, and online ordering capability was added to the company's web site. Plans were also announced to offer frozen pizzas online. The company at this time had 500 employees, 32 company-owned locations, and 7 franchise locations.

In early 2011, the chain announced plans to open another location in Piqua, Ohio. In late 2011, Pizza Today magazine ranked the company 81st in the U.S. by gross sales, at $26 million, not counting franchises. The magazine had ranked the company at #94 the previous year.

== Dough sales ==
Cassano's pizza dough is manufactured at a Kettering facility and flash-frozen before being shipped to restaurants. Since 1994, frozen dough is also sold under the auspices of Cassano's Fresh Frozen Dough Company to other companies, such as caterers, at wholesale prices.

== See also ==
- List of pizza chains of the United States
