= Pan pizza =

Pizza baked in a pan

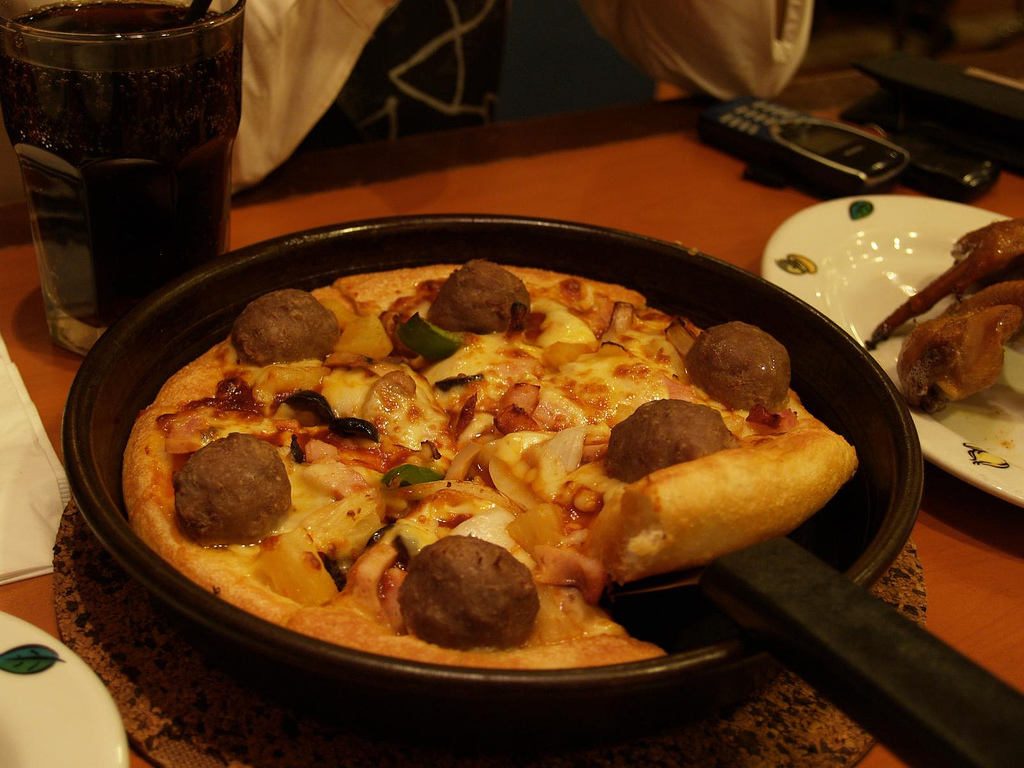
- Type: Pizza
- Place of origin: Italy

Pan pizza is a pizza baked in a deep dish pan or sheet pan. Turin-style pizza, Italian tomato pie, Sicilian pizza, Greek pizza, Chicago-style pizza, and Detroit-style pizza may be considered forms of pan pizza. Pan pizza also refers to the thick style popularized by Pizza Hut in the 1960s. The bottoms and sides of the crust become fried and crispy in the oil used to coat the pan.

== History ==
A notable early version of pan pizza is sfinciuni, born in Sicily circa 1650.

Another version is the pizza al Padellino from the city of Turin, in northern Italy, with historical references since the beginning of the 20th century.

In 1958 Dan and Frank Carney opened a pizza parlor in Wichita, Kansas, which would later become Pizza Hut. At first, the brothers focused on a thin-crust pizza which included cheese, pepperoni or sausage. The pizza parlor franchised into Pizza Hut in 1959 and added a thicker-crust pan pizza.

Other pizza companies also later included pan pizza. In 1989, Domino's introduced its deep-dish or pan pizza. Its introduction followed market research showing that forty percent of pizza customers preferred thick crusts. The new product launch cost approximately $25 million, of which $15 million was spent on new sheet-metal pans with perforated bottoms. The pan pizza recipe was reformulated in 2012.

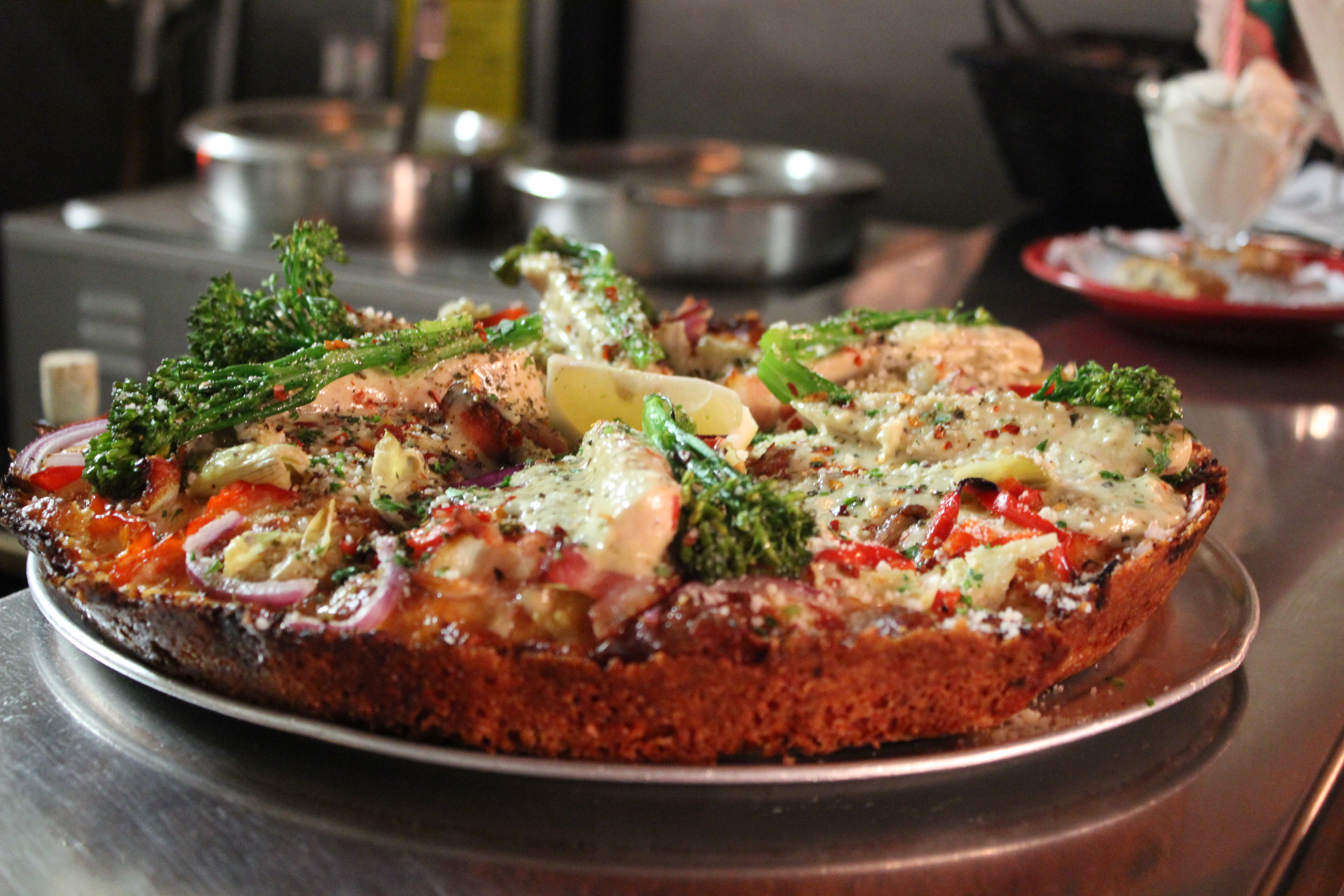
Tony Gemignani's Capo's Dillinger,
2014 World's Best Pan Pizza

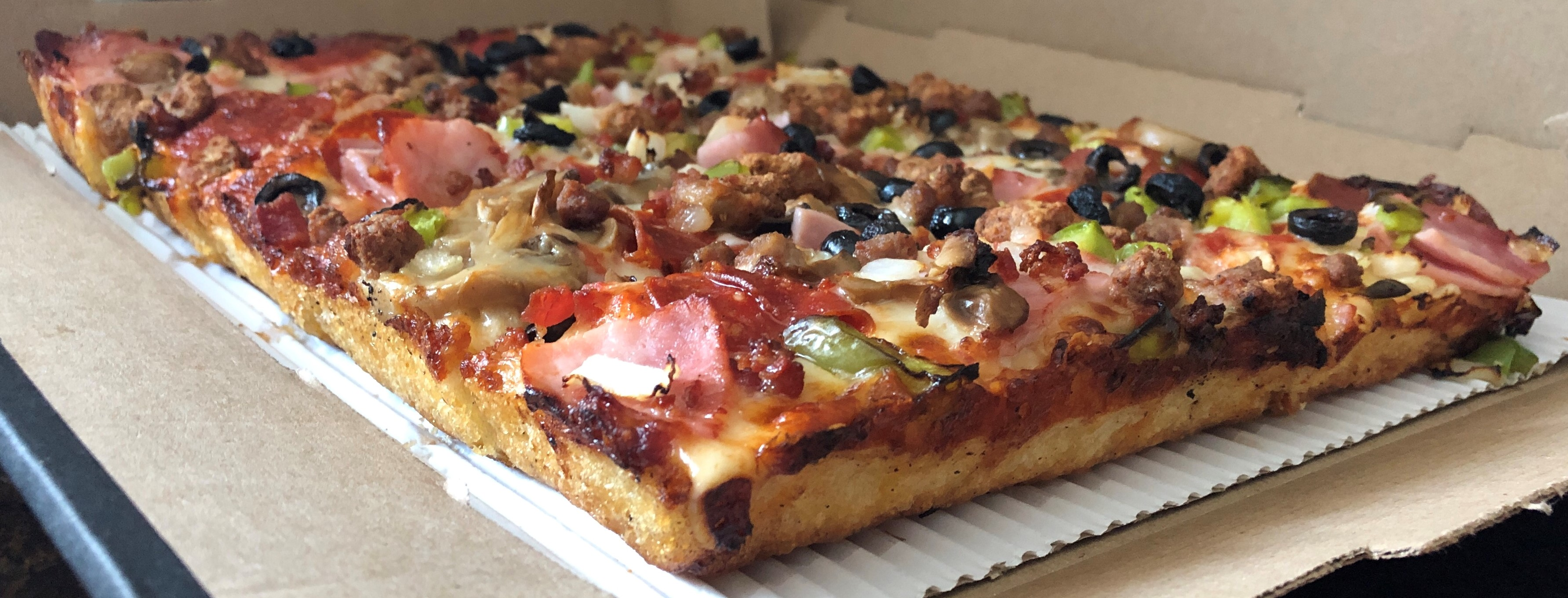
Detroit-style pizza

== See also ==
- Pizza in the United States
- List of tomato dishes
- Stuffed crust pizza
