= Leona's Pizzeria & Restaurant =

Chicago restaurant chain

- Interactive map of Leona's Pizzeria & Restaurant

Restaurant information
- Established: 1950
- Owner: Billy Marino
- Previous owner: Leona Pianetto Molinaro Szemla
- Location: 3877 N Elston Ave, Chicago, Illinois, 60618, United States
- Other locations: 8315 Ogden Ave, Lyons, IL 60534

Leona's Pizzeria & Restaurant is a Chicago-style pizzeria in Chicago founded by Leona Pianetto Molinaro Scemla in 1950.

== History ==
Pianetto worked at Pat's Pizza with her brother Pat Pianetto until a disagreement led her to leave and start her own business. The original location was at 928 W. Belmont in the Lakeview neighborhood on Chicago's north side. The restaurant serves tavern-style pizza and deep-dish pizza and other Italian cuisine. Leona's was a pioneer in the pizza delivery business. In the 1950s Pianetto purchased a small fleet of cars and mounted them with neon signs for delivery. At one time the business had more than 140 delivery drivers.

During the 1970s and 1980s the restaurant expanded under the direction of Leona's grandson Leon Toia. Eventually the chain had more than 12 locations throughout the Chicago area. In 2013, the Pianetto family was looking to downsize and began seeking a possible buyer for the brand, selling to Tania Makrakis in late 2013. Under Makrakis' ownership Leona's shrunk to two locations by 2021 after the effects of the COVID-19 pandemic and other factors resulted in a shift in the industry. In 2024, Leona's announced the closure of the Elston Ave location, planning to share a storefront with Roma's Italian Beef in Six Corners.

In May 2022, the Leona's brand was acquired by Billy Marino. Marino 's father drove a delivery car for Leona's in the 1950s.
