= Grove Street Playhouse =

Off-Broadway theatre in the West Village

- Interactive map of Grove Street Playhouse
- Address: 39 Grove Street; New York City; United States
- Coordinates: 40.73277°N 74.00444°W
- Type: Off-Broadway

Construction
- Opened: 1905

The Grove Street Playhouse, also known during its existence as the Courtyard Playhouse, was an off-Broadway theatre located on Grove Street in the West Village. As the Grove Street Playhouse, it ran from 1995 to 2002.

== Building history ==
The building was constructed in 1905 and had a number of uses throughout its history. It was first an Italian tile factory.

In 1953, the Village Arts Company settled into the space, and in 1958 the Opposite Theater Company took over. The Courtyard Players first used the former tile factory as a theatre in 1968. The space further grew into a hub for children's theatre when the Little People's Theater Company moved from 45th Street to 39 Grove Street in 1974. The 74-seat playhouse lived on the ground floor of the building, part of a four-story apartment building.

Subsequently, also known as Miss Majesties, it became the oldest children's theatre company in New York City. It took the name The Courtyard Playhouse when it was owned by Robert Stark. Later, in 1995, it became The Grove Street Playhouse under the artistic director Marilyn Majeski.

The building struggled with building violations issued by the city of New York. The Buildings Department issued violations in 1985 and 1986 related to zoning, claiming the building was not zoned for commercial use and demanding its closure. In 1991, the Environmental Control Board issued another violation, but a later ruling by the board declared the playhouse was a legal tenant. In 1999, all violations were cleared after Majeski was able to definitively prove "that theater use existed in this building prior to the zoning change effective in 1962, and that such use has been continuous." Majeski added a subplot to the theater's production of The Emperor's New Clothes about her frustrations dealing with city bureaucracy.

Grove Street Playhouse closed in 2002 due to problems renewing the lease. These problems had been ongoing, with a 1999 New York Times article noting a contentious relationship with landlord Felix Bernardo. As of 2021, Emmett's on Grove, a tavern-style pizza restaurant, occupied the space.

== Productions ==
In 1994, at the Courtyard Playhouse, a production of Sleeping Beauty was so popular it saved the theater from bankruptcy. Notable productions at the Grove Street Playhouse included Private Life, a fictional play about Noël Coward, and the musical Queen of Hearts, a biomusical about Princess Diana by Claudia Perry and Stephen Stahl.
