= Donatos Pizza =

Pizza restaurant chain in the United States

Donatos Pizzeria, LLC
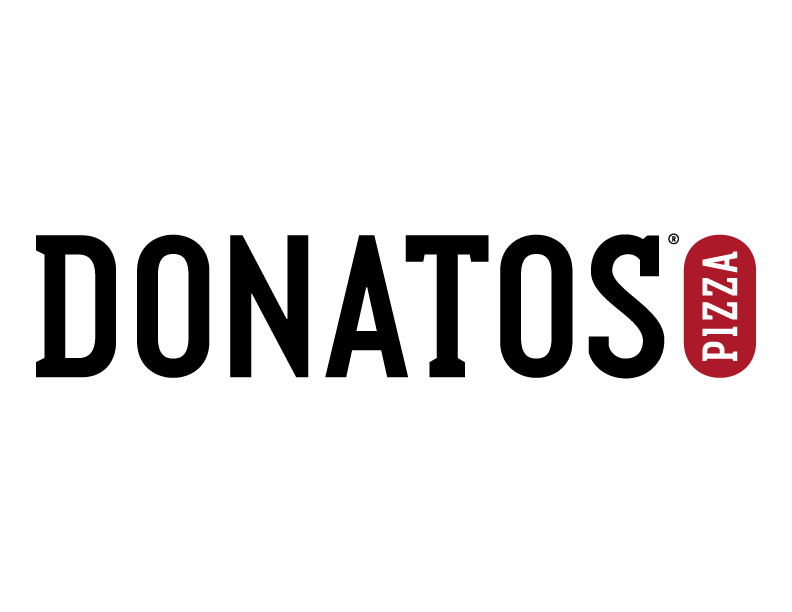

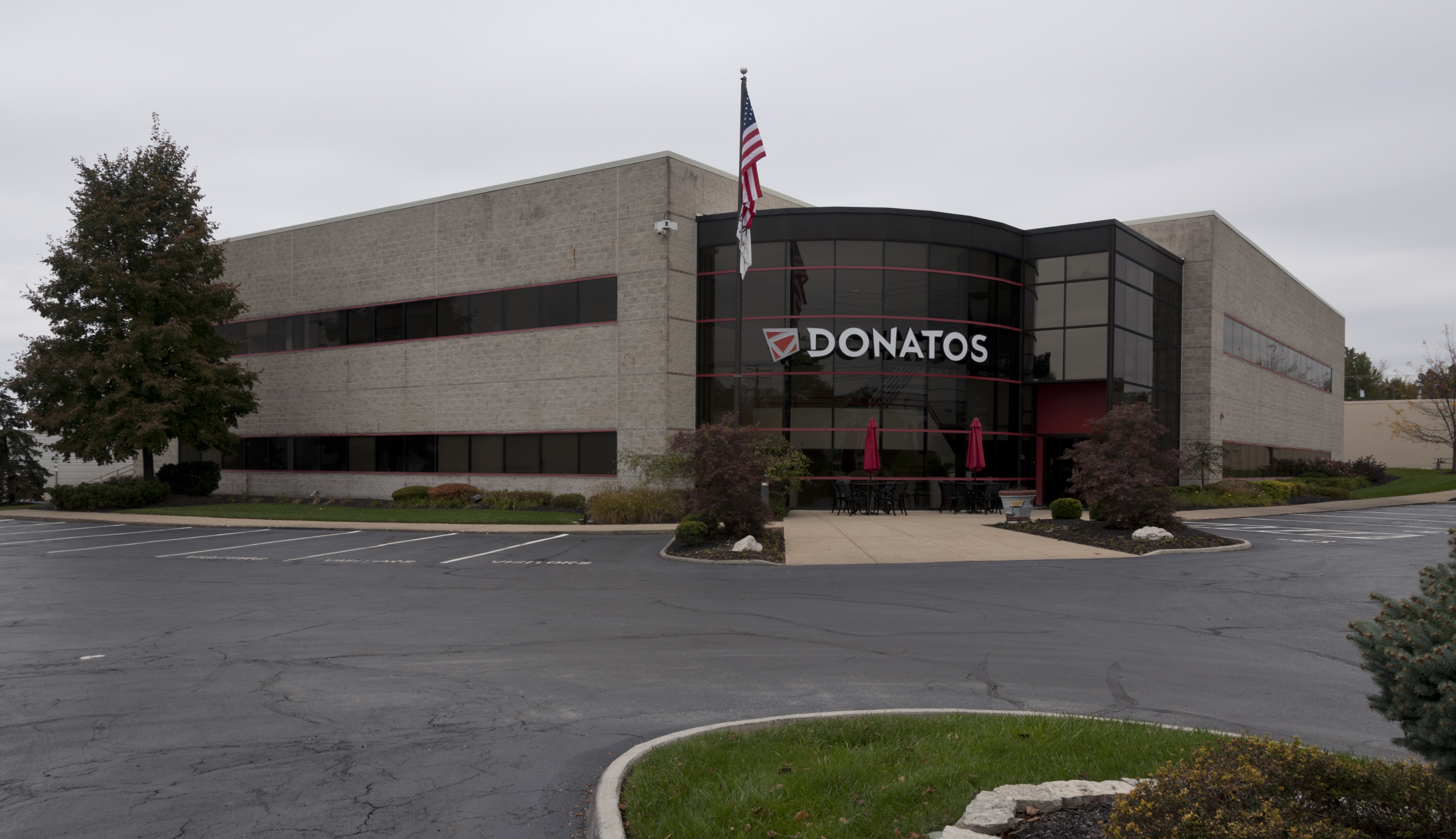
- Donatos Pizza headquarters in Gahanna, Ohio
- Trade name: Donatos Pizza
- Type: Private
- Industry: Restaurant
- Founded: 1963; 63 years ago
- Founder: Jim Grote
- Headquarters: Gahanna, Ohio, U.S.
- Number of locations: 449 Stores (December 2025)
- Key people: Jane Grote Abell (chairwoman); Kevin King (CEO)
- Products: Pizza, subs, salads
- Website: donatos.com

The original Donatos Pizza restaurant on Thurman Avenue in Columbus is still one of the chain's busiest and most successful locations.

Donatos Pizzeria, LLC, doing business as Donatos Pizza, is an American pizza restaurant chain headquartered in Gahanna, Ohio, United States that specializes in Columbus-style pizza. Donatos and its franchise partners operate over 400 stores in thirty U.S. states. Donatos Pizza is also served in nearly 300 non-traditional locations nationwide, including select Red Robin restaurants.

== History ==
In 1963, Ohio State sophomore Jim Grote purchased the original Donatos located on the south side of Columbus, Ohio, for $1,300. Grote had been working at the restaurant since he was thirteen. He kept the name Donatos, which originally had an apostrophe. Donato is a conjugation of the Latin word, dono, which means to give.

In 1991, the Donatos Pizza in Zanesville, Ohio, opened as the company's first franchise location. As of 2023, there are about three dozen franchisees operating more than 170 Donatos Pizza locations in twelve states: Alabama, Florida, Georgia, Indiana, Kentucky, Ohio, Oklahoma, Pennsylvania, South Carolina, Tennessee, Virginia, and Texas.

In 1999, Donatos was purchased by McDonald's in an attempt to enter the pizza industry. (Note: Although before McDonald's acquired the company, McDonald's had first entered the pizza industry by introducing McDonald's Pizza (which in the 1980s, renamed McPizza) in the late 1970s. But just a year after the company acquired Donatos, McPizza was discontinued due to that it took 11 minutes to cook a pizza, and McDonald's wanted to keep its reputation for fast service. McDonald's had still been in the pizza industry until 2003.) A majority interest in Donatos was repurchased by Jim Grote and daughter Jane Grote Abell in 2003 as McDonald's sought to refocus on its core business. During this period Donatos also had operations in Munich, Germany.

In 2017, Donatos founder Jim Grote led a $1 million seed round in BeeHex, the 3D-food printing company with NASA origins.

In 2018, Donatos partnered with Red Robin to sell pizzas in their restaurants. This followed a foray into pizza by Red Robin in 2017 with a test run of Round Table Pizza at a Red Robin store near Portland, Oregon. After launching at 4 Red Robin restaurants in the summer of 2018, Donatos was served in 25 restaurants by February 2020, with plans to expand into 100 additional Red Robin restaurants in 2020 and another 150 per year in 2021 and 2022, bringing Donatos to about 425 of Red Robin's 570 restaurants by the end of 2022. The Donatos partnership costs about $145,000 per store, which includes the installation of a pizza oven in the kitchen. Donatos makes its secret-recipe dough in a facility in Ohio and ships fresh dough to restaurants all over the country, where the pizzas are made in Red Robin kitchens exactly the same way they would be made in a Donatos restaurant.

== Products ==
Donatos is known for its thin-crust pizza "loaded Edge to Edge" with toppings, particularly its large pepperoni pizza that includes 100+ pepperoni slices. In 2009, Donatos launched a hand-tossed pie-cut crust option. In 2004, the company introduced Donatos take-and-bake pizza in Kroger supermarkets.

== In popular culture ==
In 2013, Jane Grote Abell, the chairwoman of Donatos and daughter of its founder Jim Grote, was featured in an episode of Undercover Boss.

== See also ==
- List of pizza chains of the United States
