= Colorado-style pizza =

Style of pizza

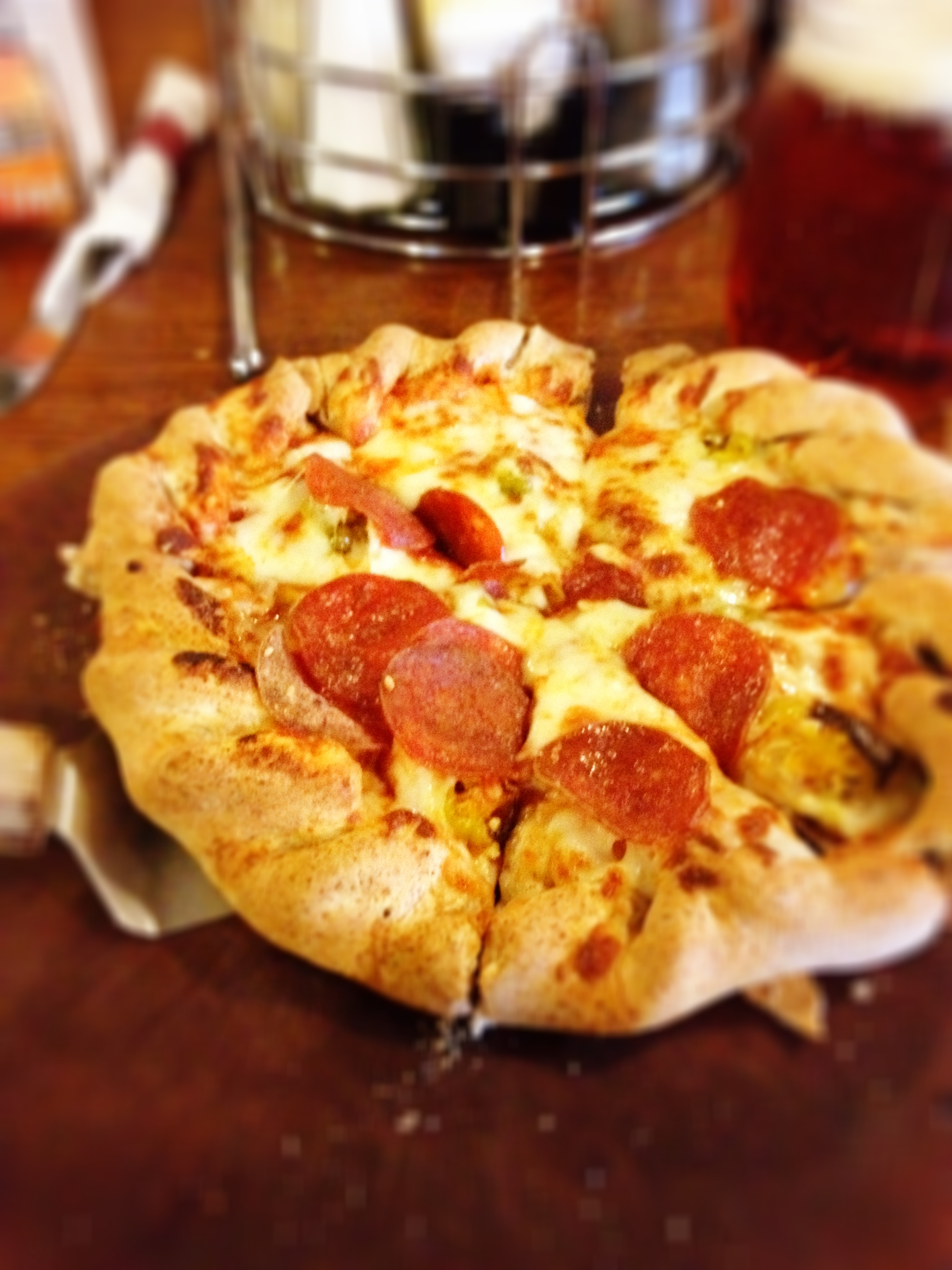
- Colorado-style pepperoni pizza
- Alternative names: Colorado pizza, Colorado mountain pie
- Type: Pizza
- Place of origin: United States
- Region or state: Colorado
- Created by: Chip Bair
- Main ingredients: Pizza dough, tomato sauce, cheese, honey

Colorado-style pizza, also called Colorado mountain pie, is a trademarked name for pizza served at the Beau Jo's pizza restaurant chain in Colorado. The restaurant's pizza is made with a thick, braided crust topped with heavy amounts of sauce and cheese. The restaurant serves it by the pound, with a side of honey as a condiment.

== History ==
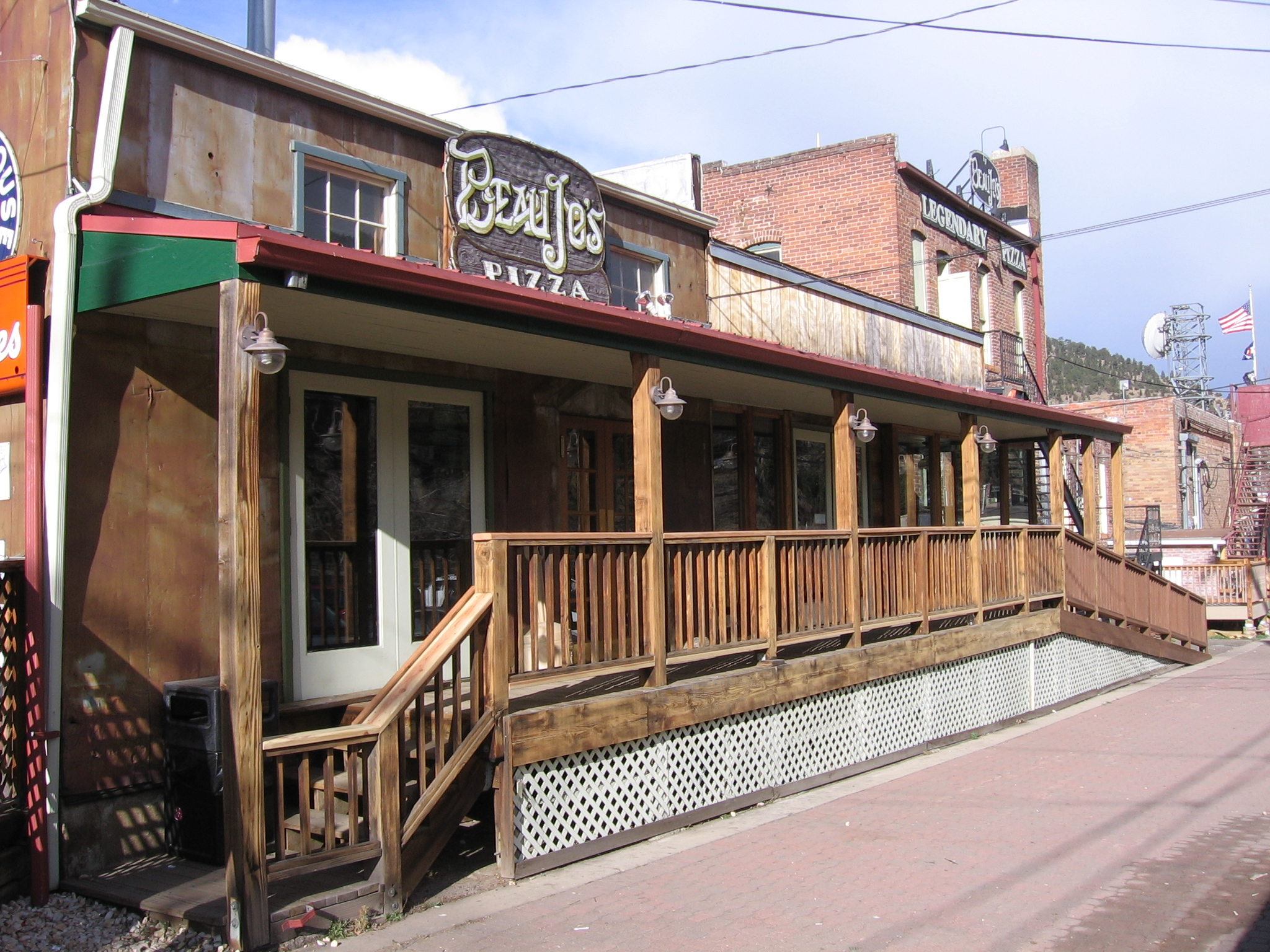
Beau Jo's Pizza in Idaho Springs

Colorado-style pizza was invented by Chip Bair after he purchased the Beau Jo's pizza restaurant in Idaho Springs, Colorado, in 1973. Bair wanted to create a new style of pizza and thought that a braided crust would be visually appealing to customers. The pizza was successful, and Beau Jo's became a regional chain.

While some other pizza restaurants within Colorado and outside the state also sell pizza with thick crust or with honey on the side, they cannot call it Colorado-style pizza or mountain pies, as both names are trademarked by Beau Jo's. This has limited the spread of the recipe and its status as a distinct regional style.

== Description ==
Beau Jo's Colorado-style pizza is made with a thick, braided whole-wheat crust that has been sweetened by adding honey to the dough. It is topped with a sweet tomato sauce and heavy amounts of whole milk Mozzarella cheese and other optional toppings. The braided crust makes the pizza more stable and prevents the thick toppings from becoming messy. It has some similarities to Chicago-style pizza, but is sweeter and has a shorter cooking time.

Beau Jo's pies are sold by the pound due to the weight of each slice's toppings, ranging from one to five pounds since 1973. Honey is provided as a side for dipping the pizza crust in, which Beau Jo's calls a "built in dessert".

== See also ==
- List of pizza varieties by country
- Pizza in the United States
