= New Jersey thin-crust pizza =

Regional pizza traditions in New Jersey

New Jersey thin-crust pizza refers to several regional pizza traditions in New Jersey, including Trenton tomato pie and North and Central Jersey thin-crust.

== Regional traditions ==
=== Trenton tomato pie ===
The Trenton tomato pie developed in Mercer County during the early 20th century. The style is characterized by placing mozzarella cheese directly onto the dough base before topping it with crushed tomatoes or sauce. The tradition began with the opening of Joe's Tomato Pies in 1910, followed by Papa's Tomato Pies in 1912.

A thin-crust sausage and pepper pizza from Federici's Family Restaurant in Freehold.

=== North and Central Jersey thin-crust ===
Thin-crust pizza is a longstanding style served in taverns and pizzerias throughout North and Central Jersey. While frequently sold in drinking establishments, pizza historian Scott Wiener notes that not every pizza served in a tavern constitutes a classic "bar pie." Wiener defines a true bar pie by its personal size—averaging 10 inches in diameter—as well as being rolled out, topped to the outer edge, and baked in a greased pan. In contrast, many historic New Jersey tavern pizzerias produce larger, shared thin-crust pies baked directly in deck or brick ovens.

== Notable establishments ==
=== North Jersey ===
- Patsy's Tavern (Paterson): Established in 1931, Patsy's is a Paterson pizzeria known for its thin-crust pizza baked in brick ovens.
- Kinchley's Tavern (Ramsey): Operating as a tavern since 1937, Kinchley's introduced thin-crust pizza in 1947 and serves round pies cut into square portions.
- Star Tavern (Orange): Star Tavern is an Essex County tavern known for serving some of New Jersey's best thin-crust pizza since 1945.

=== Central Jersey and the Jersey Shore ===
A commemorative T-shirt from Pete & Elda's "Whole Pie Challenge."

- Federici's Family Restaurant (Freehold): Established in 1921, Federici's is a Monmouth County restaurant known for its thin-crust pizza.
- Vic's Bar & Restaurant (Bradley Beach): Founded by Vittorio "Vic" Giunco, Vic's has served thin-crust pizza since 1947.
- Pete & Elda's (Neptune City): Operating since 1961, Pete & Elda's is known for its thin-crust pizza and its "Whole Pie Challenge," which awards a commemorative T-shirt to customers who finish an 18-inch pie in 30 minutes.

== In popular culture ==
=== Bruce Springsteen ===
Federici's in Freehold is mentioned in musician Bruce Springsteen's 2016 autobiography Born to Run. A longstanding belief that the restaurant's founders were related to E Street Band organist Danny Federici was disputed in 2018, when former bandmate Vini Lopez stated that the families were unrelated.

== See also ==
- Pizza in the United States
- Trenton tomato pie
- Tavern-style pizza
- New York-style pizza
