= Marion's Piazza =

American pizzeria chain

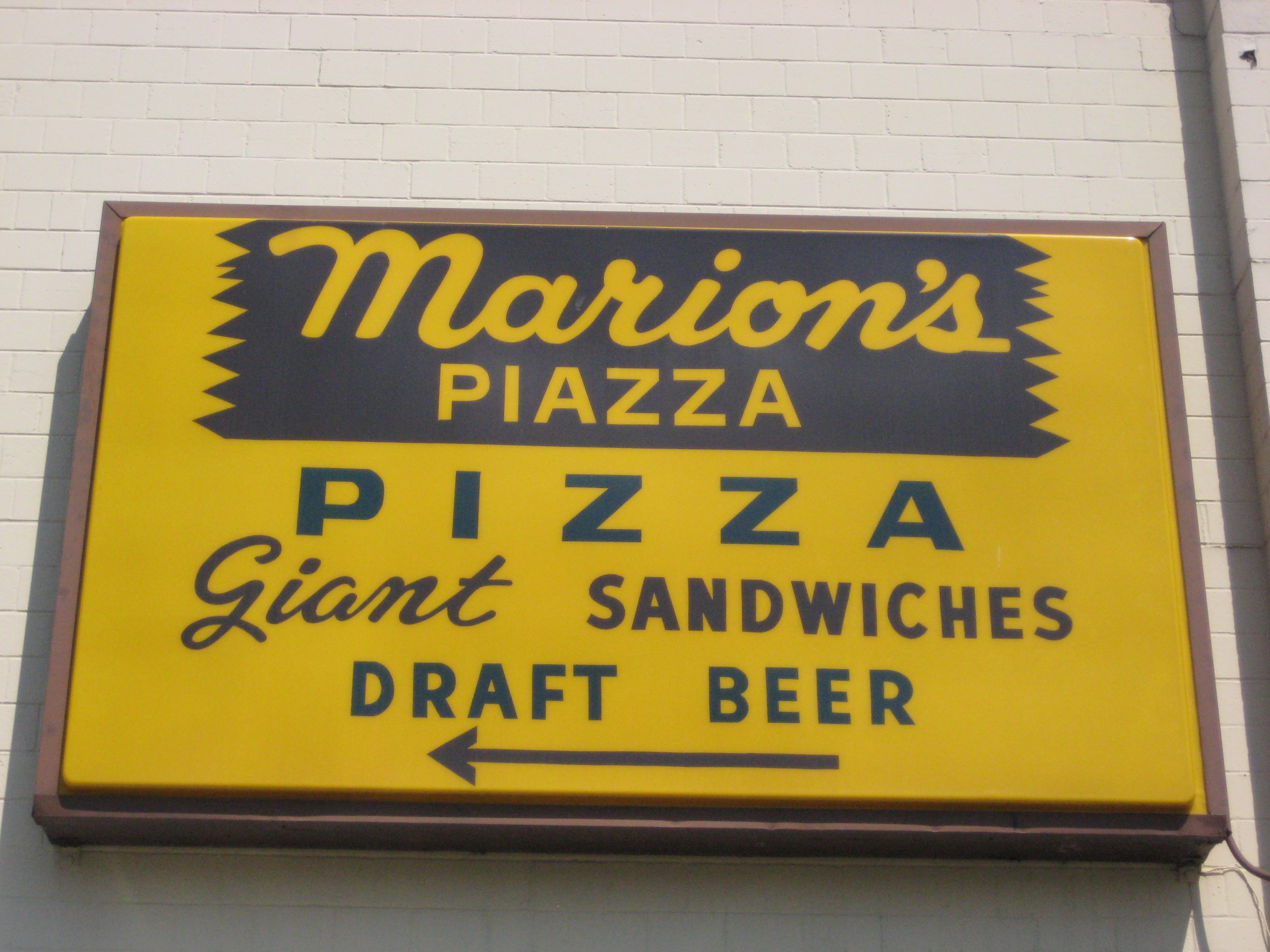
- Signage for Marion's Piazza
- Type: Private
- Industry: Restaurant
- Founded: August 19, 1965; 61 years ago in Dayton, Ohio, United States
- Founder: Marion Glass
- Headquarters: Dayton, Ohio, United States
- Number of locations: 9
- Area served: Southwest Ohio
- Products: Pizza, subs, pasta, salads
- Owner: Carol Glass Pollock
- Website: marionspiazza.com

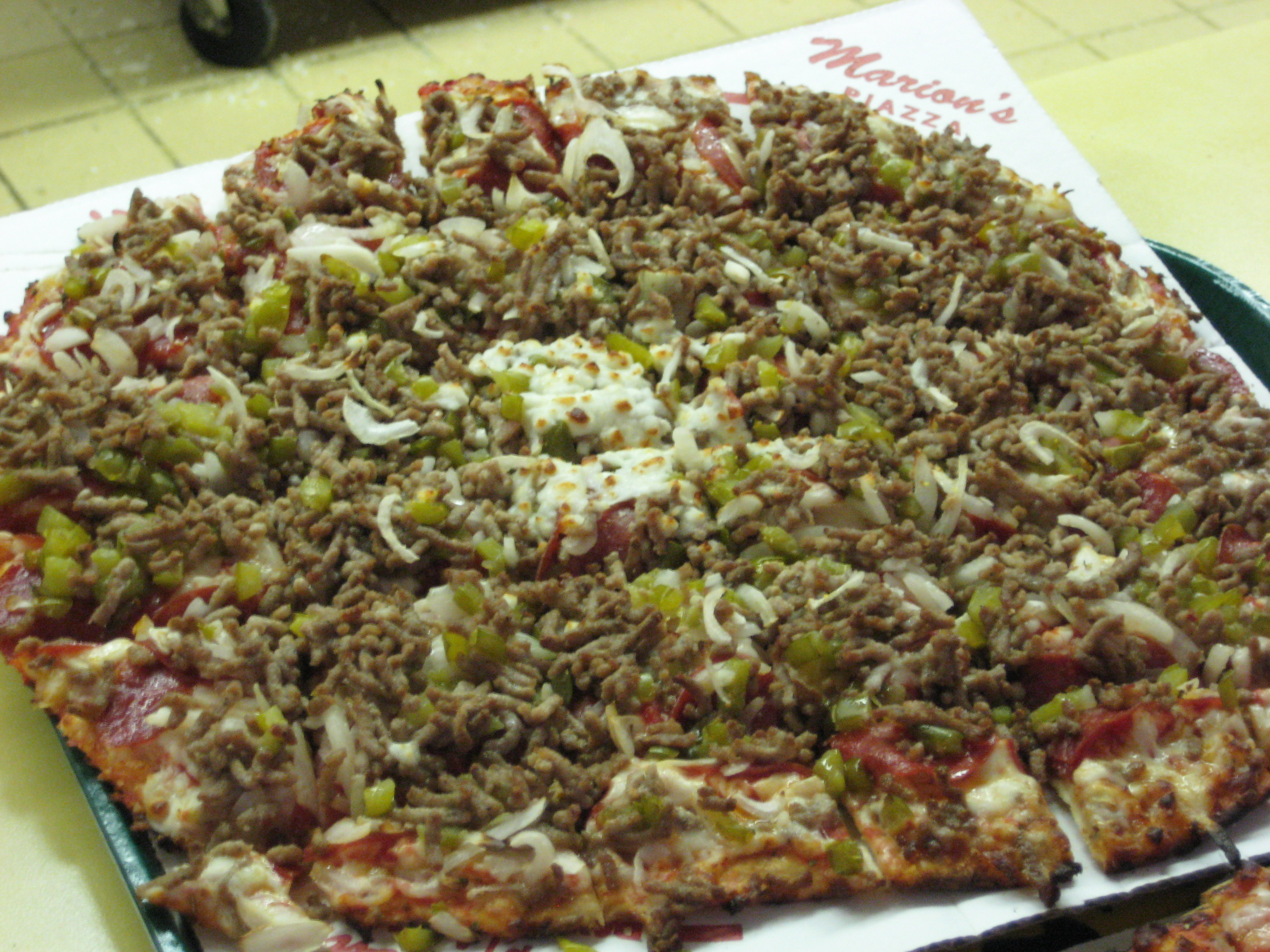
Deluxe Pizza with extra cheese, with characteristic small square slices

Marion's Piazza is a pizzeria chain based in Dayton, Ohio. Established in 1965 by Marion Glass, the company operates nine restaurants throughout the greater Dayton area. Marion's son, Roger Glass, took over as CEO after Marion's death in 2006 and continued to manage the company until his own death in August 2022.

The pizzeria produces Dayton-style pizza. In 2017, it was recognized by the trade publication Pizza Today as the independent pizza chain with highest sales. Roger Glass, the CEO, noted that the company had won the award four of the previous five years.

== History ==
The company was founded on August 19, 1965, by Marion Glass. Glass was an owner of three franchises for the larger Dayton-area Cassano's Pizza King chain. Glass said he wanted his own restaurant because he wanted to offer a dining-room experience as opposed to the mostly delivery and carry-out options.

His departure from Cassano's came a year after what the Dayton Daily News dubbed the "pizza wars". A fellow Cassano's franchisee, Ron Holp, broke off and opened his own restaurant, which led to a lawsuit between Holp and Cassano's, in which Holp was accused of stealing pizza dough from the company. After Holp won the case, Glass asked if he could buy dough for Marion's. While Holp would not sell it, his wife showed Glass how to make the dough.

As of 2018 the chain was selling a million pizzas yearly. PMQ magazine, a trade journal of the pizza industry, named them to its hall of fame.

== 1965 price promotions ==
Every 5 years, for one day only, Marion's Piazza sells their traditional menu items at the original 1965 price (e.g., a small cheese pizza for $0.80 and a large deluxe pizza for $2.50).

== Kenley Players cast parties ==
One of the distinct characteristics of every Marion's Piazza location is the photos found on the walls. From 1966 to 1995, the Kenley Players would hold cast parties at Marion's after their summer theatre performances. Today, the walls are filled with black and white photographs of the parties. Many of the photos are autographed by the celebrities. The photographs include celebrities such as Paul Lynde, Desi Arnaz, Jr., Sandy Duncan, Sally Field, McLean Stevenson, Barry Williams, Gary Sandy, Loni Anderson, Robert Goulet, Mickey Rooney, William Shatner, Tim Conway, Morgan Fairchild, Dom DeLuise, Joyce DeWitt, Billy Crystal, Bill Bixby, Karla DeVito, Rip Taylor, and George Hamilton among others. The photos serve as memorial of Marion's tradition in the Dayton area.

== See also ==
- St. Louis-style pizza – similar to Marion's square-slice pizza
