= Dayton-style pizza =

Type of thin crust pizza

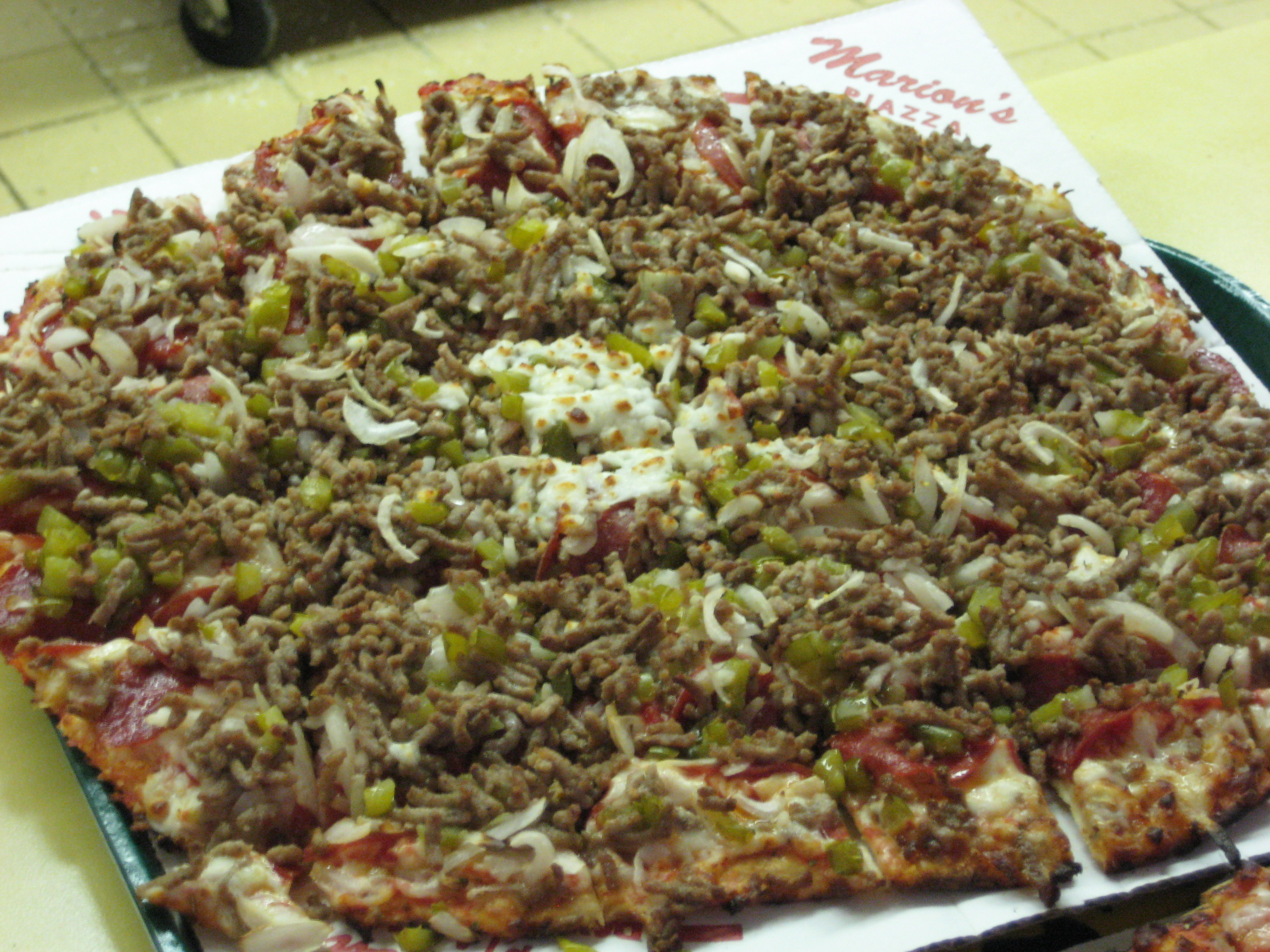
Dayton-style pizza

Dayton-style pizza has a thin, crisp, salty crust, sometimes described as a "cracker crust", dusted on the bottom with cornmeal and topped with a thin layer of thick unsweetened sauce. Cheese and other topping ingredients are heavily distributed and spread edge-to-edge with no outer rim of crust, and the finished pizza is cut into bite-size squares. The style shares some characteristics with other Midwestern pizza styles, which tend to be thin-crusted and square-cut.

Larger chains include Cassano's Pizza King and Marion's Piazza. Cassano's opened its first restaurant in 1953 and Marion's in 1965. Marion's eventually became more popular in the city; as of 2018 it was selling a million pizzas yearly. Donatos, a regional chain based in Columbus, serves pizza that has been mistaken for Dayton-style pizza, but it has no connection to Dayton.

The first Cassano's was Dayton's first pizza shop and was carryout-only. Pizza was unfamiliar to many in the Midwest before World War II, and women customers told Cassano's owner Vic Cassano that they found it messy to eat; his response was to develop the small square cut that is one of the style's ubiquitous characteristics. The bite-size cut also allowed those unfamiliar with pizza to try a small piece instead of committing to an entire slice. The cut is called a party cut or hors d'oeuvre cut. The squares are cut smaller than the "tavern cut" used for other midwestern pizza styles.

The first Marion's was Dayton's first eat-in pizza restaurant. Marion Glass had operated a Cassano's franchise in the early 1960s.

Ron Holp, who had operated a Cassano's franchise from 1960 through 1964, opened his own pizza shop, Ron's Pizza, in 1963, according to the Dayton Daily News sparking the "Dayton Pizza Wars". Cassano sued Holp, claiming that Holp was using Cassano's dough in his own shop. After the lawsuit was settled in Holp's favor, Glass, then also operating a Cassano's franchise, convinced Holp to share his dough recipe so that Glass could open his own restaurant serving the style.

Cincinnati Enquirer dining editor Polly Campbell called the style "similar to the more famous St. Louis style, but ... better". Laughing Squid called the style unique.
