= Buffalo-style pizza =

Style of pizza from Buffalo, New York

- Square-cut slice of Buffalo-style pizza
- Type: Pizza
- Place of origin: United States
- Region or state: Buffalo, New York
- Main ingredients: Pizza dough, sweet tomato sauce, mozzarella, cup-and-char pepperoni

Buffalo-style pizza is a thick, chewy crust pizza dish with a heavy layer of mozzarella cheese and sweet tomato sauce that originated in Buffalo, New York.

Buffalo-style pizza emerged in the mid-20th century, roughly during the 1940s and 1950s, as Italian-American pizzerias in Western New York adapted traditional Sicilian and New York pizza styles into something heartier and more shareable. Its signature traits—thicker crust, sweeter sauce, cup-and-char pepperoni, and square-cut slices—became especially popular after World War II as neighborhood pizza shops spread throughout Buffalo and nearby towns. There is no single inventor officially credited with creating Buffalo-style pizza, since it evolved gradually through local pizzerias rather than being introduced by one restaurant alone.

The reception of Buffalo-style pizza in Buffalo has been strongly tied to local identity and pride, where it is considered a signature comfort food alongside Buffalo wings and beef on weck.
