= Quad City–style pizza =

Style of pizza

Quad City–style Pizza
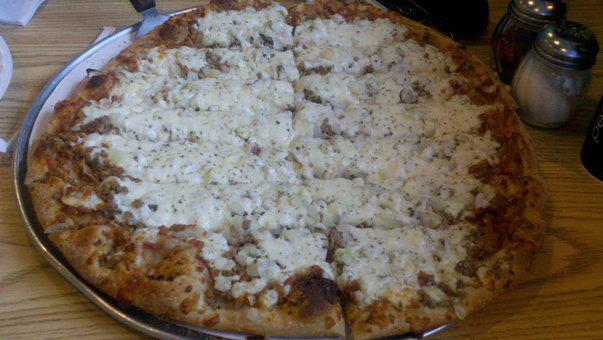
- This style of pizza usually has most of the toppings under the cheese.
- Type: Pizza
- Place of origin: United States
- Region or state: Quad Cities
- Created by: Tony Maniscalco Sr. of Tony's Pizzeria (1952)
- Main ingredients: Pizza dough with malt, tomato sauce with red chili flakes and cayenne, sausage, cheese

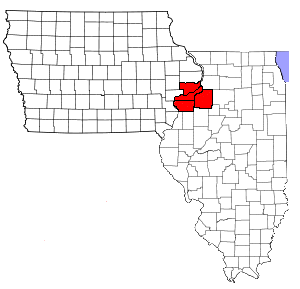
Location of the Quad Cities

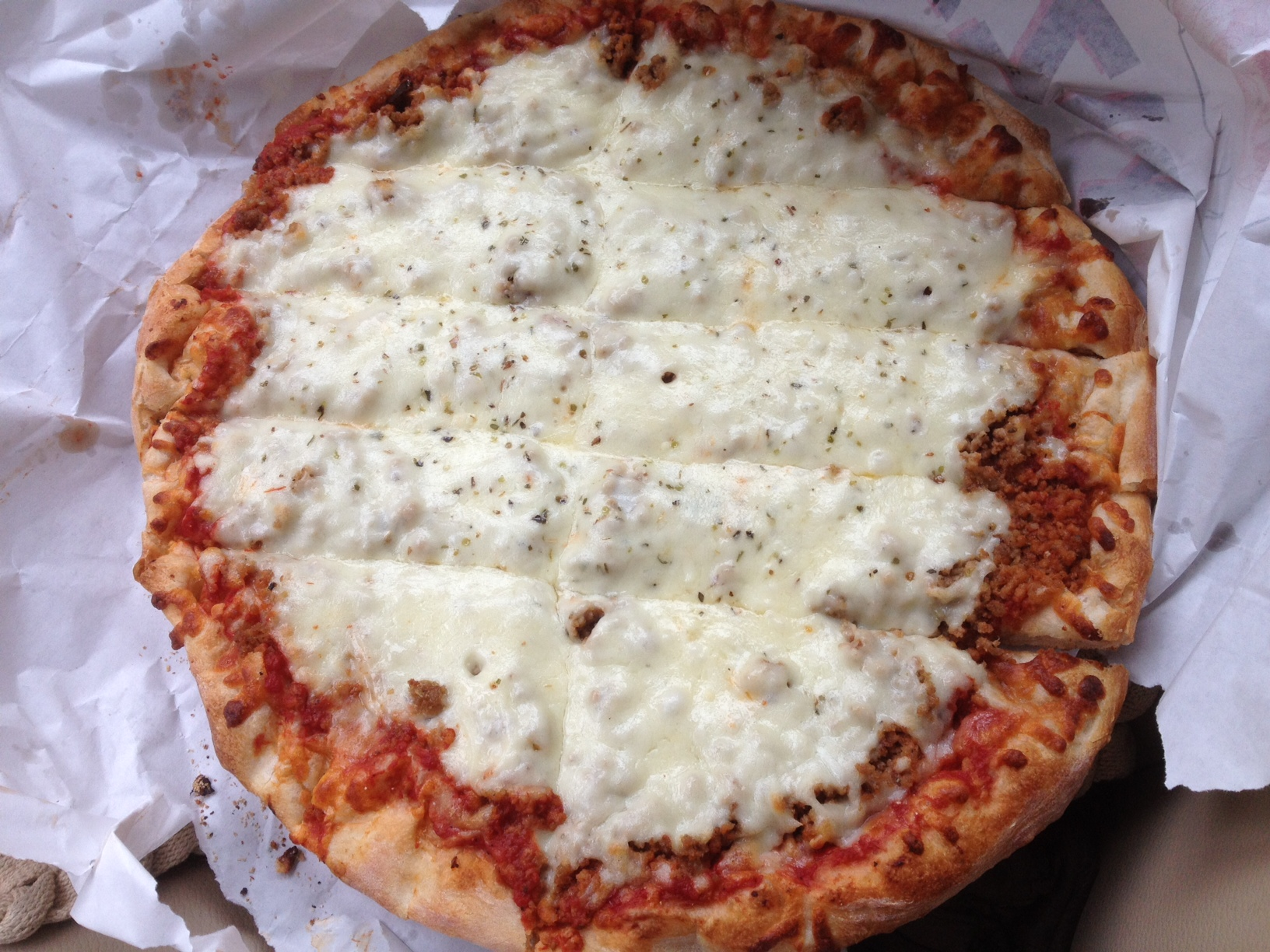
Sausage pizza from Fat Boy's Pizza of Davenport, Iowa

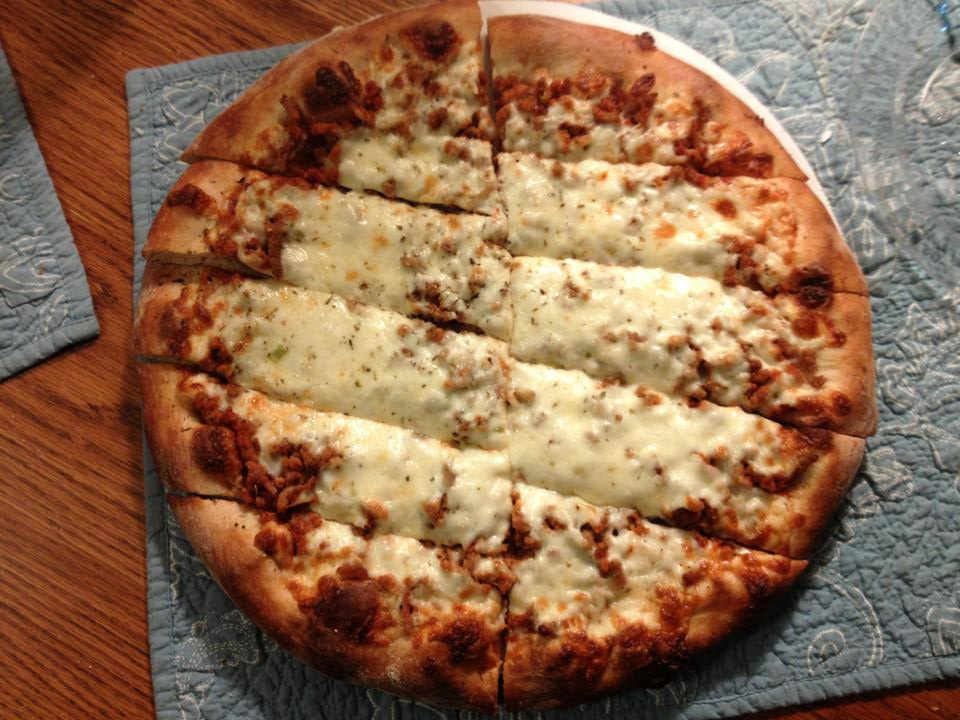
Sausage pizza from Harris Pizza (Davenport, Iowa location)

Quad City–style pizza is a variety of pizza originating in the Quad Cities region of the states of Illinois and Iowa in the United States.

== Characteristics ==
Characteristics of Quad City–style pizza include malt in the crust, tomato sauce made with red chili flakes or cayenne pepper, toppings placed under the cheese, and being cut into strips instead of triangular slices.

== History ==
The first person to bring pizza to the Quad Cities was Tony Maniscalco Sr. in 1952. Born of two immigrant parents from Sicily, Maniscalco came to the Quad Cities from Calumet City, Illinois, where he was a butcher by trade. He developed "Quad Cities Style Pizza" using a base recipe from the Bacino family.

== Preparation ==
Quad City–style pizza dough contains a "spice jam", with a heavy amount of malt, which lends it a toasted, nutty flavor. The pizzas are hand-tossed to be stretched into an even quarter-inch thin crust with a slight lip ringing the edge. The sauce contains both red chili flakes and ground cayenne pepper, and the smooth, thin tomato spread is more spicy than sweet. The sausage is typically a thick blanket of lean, fennel-flecked Italian sausage, sometimes ground twice and spread from edge to edge. The pizzas are cooked using a special gas oven with an average cooking time of about 12 minutes. The pizza is cut into strips, as opposed to being cut in triangular slices. An average 16-inch pizza has about 14 strips, and a 10-inch pizza has about 10 strips.

== By region ==
The dish originates in the Quad Cities region of the United States.

The dish has been prepared in other areas of the United States, including Mahtomedi, Minnesota; Acworth, Georgia; Harrisburg, North Carolina (Pub 49); Mesa, Arizona; West Des Moines, Iowa; Northwest and Central Indiana and Chicago, Illinois.

The Outsiders Pizza Company now sells a frozen version of the Quad City–style pizza nationwide through major retail store chains.

== See also ==
- Detroit-style pizza
- Italian tomato pie
- Sicilian pizza
- List of pizza varieties by country
- List of regional dishes of the United States
