= Greek pizza =

Pizza variant in New England

- Greek-style pizza
- Type: Pizza
- Place of origin: United States
- Region or state: New England
- Main ingredients: Pizza dough, cheese, (sometimes) tomato sauce

In the cuisine of the United States, Greek pizza is a style of pizza crust and preparation where the pizza is proofed and cooked in a metal pan rather than stretched to order and baked on the floor of the pizza oven. A shallow pan is used, unlike the deep pans used in Sicilian, Chicago, or Detroit-styled pizzas. Its crust is typically spongy, airy, and light, like focaccia but not as thick. The crust is also rather oily, due to the coating of oil applied to the pan during preparation.

In the United States, Greek-style pizza is common in New England and parts of eastern New York State, and restaurants serving the style are often identified by the epithet pizza house or house of pizza.

== History ==
Greek pizza was invented by Costas Kitsatis, aka Constantinos Kombouzis, aka "Charlie", a Greek from Albania, at his restaurant Pizza House that was located at 86 Truman St., New London, Connecticut, in 1955. His system consisted of preparing a full day's supply of crusts in 10-inch pans in the morning rather than tossing and stretching the dough to order.
