= Minnesota-style pizza =

Regional style of pizza

Minnesota–style pizza
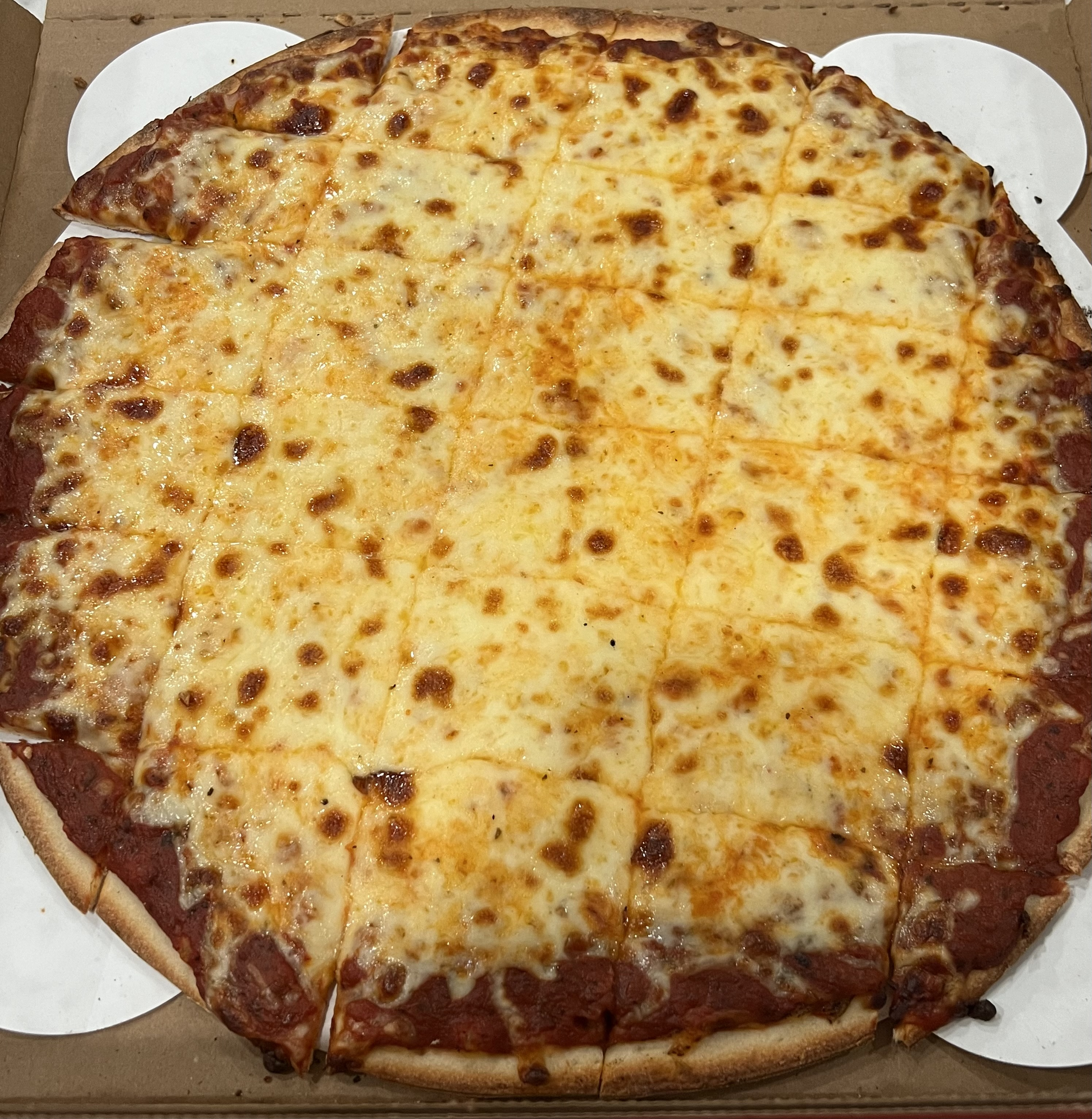
- Type: Pizza
- Course: Main course
- Place of origin: United States
- Region or state: Minnesota
- Main ingredients: Unleavened pizza dough, typically spicy tomato sauce, mozzarella, hearty toppings

Minnesota-style pizza is a circular thin-crust pizza, cut into squares, with spicy sauce, and hearty toppings.

== History ==
Minnesota-style pizza was likely inspired by the tavern style of pizza that became popular in Chicago in the mid-20th century.

During the 1950s and 60s, several pizzerias in Minnesota began selling flat crust pizzas cut into squares. These early pizzerias included Red's Savoy Inn and Mama's Pizza in Saint Paul; Broadway Pizza in Minneapolis; Sammy's Pizza in Hibbing, which opened in 1954.

Red's Savoy Inn adopted a Minnesota-style pizza brand name, "'Sota style", beginning in 2017.

Carbones, a pizza chain, also sells Minnesota-style pizza in the Twin Cities area.

== Characteristics ==
Minnesota-style pizza's defining characteristic, as compared to tavern-style pizza, is its somewhat spicy tomato sauce. PMQ Pizza Magazine called Red Savoy's "passive-aggressive". In addition, Minnesota-style pizza crusts are tend to be slightly softer. However, like tavern style the slices are cut into squares.

Toppings are often generous.

== See also ==
- Cuisine of Minnesota
- Pizza in the United States
