= Columbus-style pizza =

American regional pizza style of Columbus, Ohio

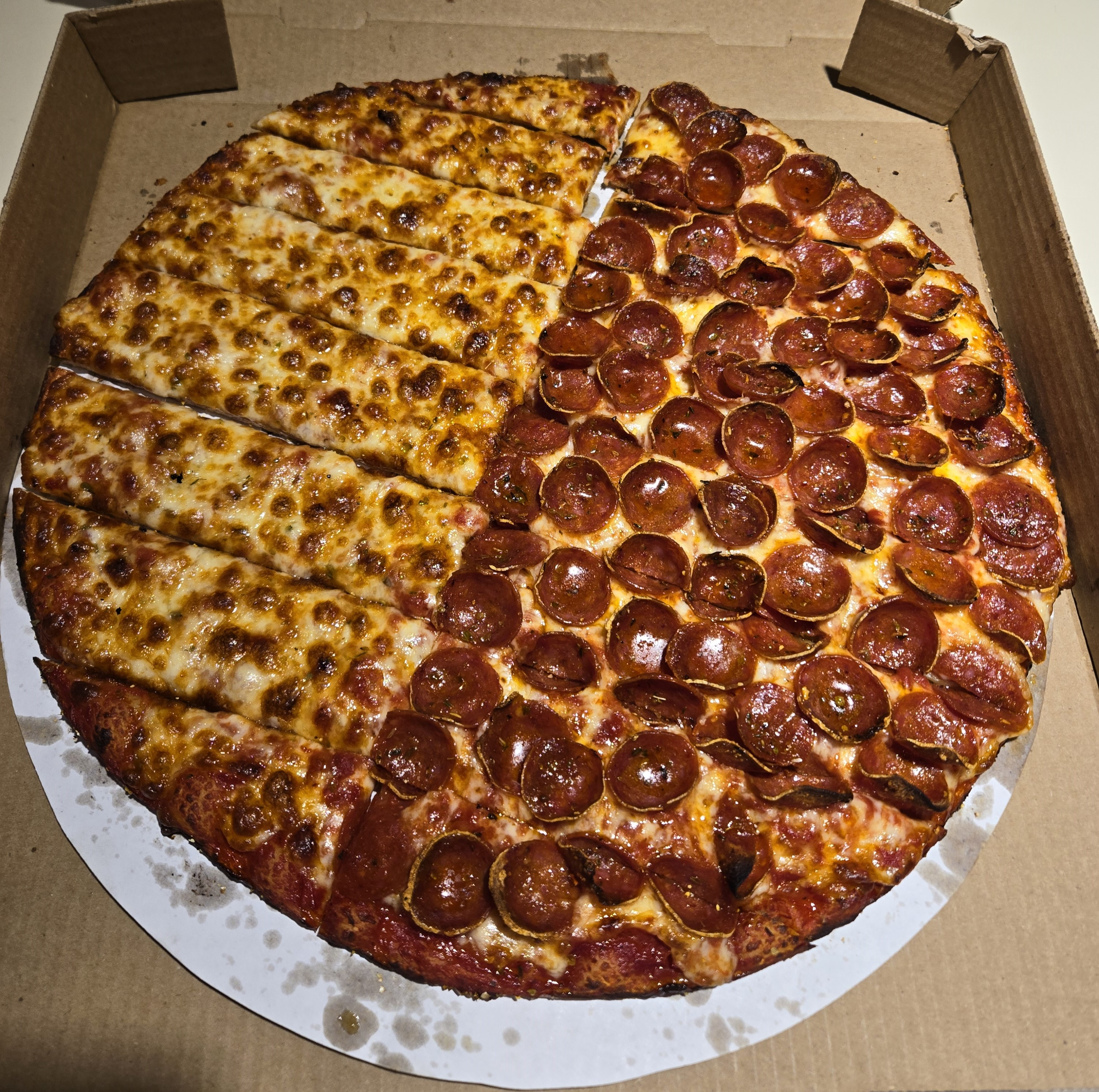
Pizza with provolone cheese and abundant cup-and-char pepperoni on one half

Columbus-style pizza is an American regional pizza style associated with Columbus, Ohio. It has a circular shape, pieces cut into short or long rectangles, thin or no crust, dense toppings that cover the surface, and, usually, provolone cheese and a slightly sweet sauce. It was developed in the early 1950s by Jimmy Massey and Romeo Sirij.

== Components ==
The crust of a Columbus-style pizza is thin, but it has yeast, unlike some similar styles such as St. Louis–style pizza. Crust recipes and preparation methods vary among pizzerias, so the texture of a crust ranges from slightly bubbly to crispy to dense and crunchy. There is generally no raised ring of bare crust around the edge, as sauce and toppings are loaded as close to the edge as practical. Sauce is placed on the crust before toppings, and the sauce tends to be on the sweeter side compared to other pizza styles. Oregano and garlic feature prominently in pizza sauce, and different sauce flavors are a key differentiator from one Columbus pizzeria to another.

Cheese placed on the sauce tends to be provolone, smoked provolone or a blend of mozzarella and provolone, and, if no additional toppings are used, it covers the pizza completely. If other toppings are used, they are used generously, with pepperoni completely covering the surface, for example. Several Columbus pizzerias grind their own sausage to old family recipes.

== Preparation and packaging ==
Pizzas are usually prepared in shallow, circular pans. For this reason, some pizzerias use cornmeal under the crust to prevent sticking to the pan. Most traditional Columbus pizzerias use an electric or gas deck oven, which requires skill, careful observation and a longer baking time than a conveyor oven but allows for higher capacity and more control over the doneness of the bake.

Pizzas are almost always sliced into rectangular pieces. These can be anything from small, bite-size squares to long, thin rectangles. The long rectangle cut style was more popular in the first few decades, but smaller squares later became more popular. Pizzas were originally placed in tented paper bags for takeout, but as pizza boxes were introduced and improved, those supplanted the paper bags due to stackability and heat retention.
