= Pepperoni =

American variety of spicy salami

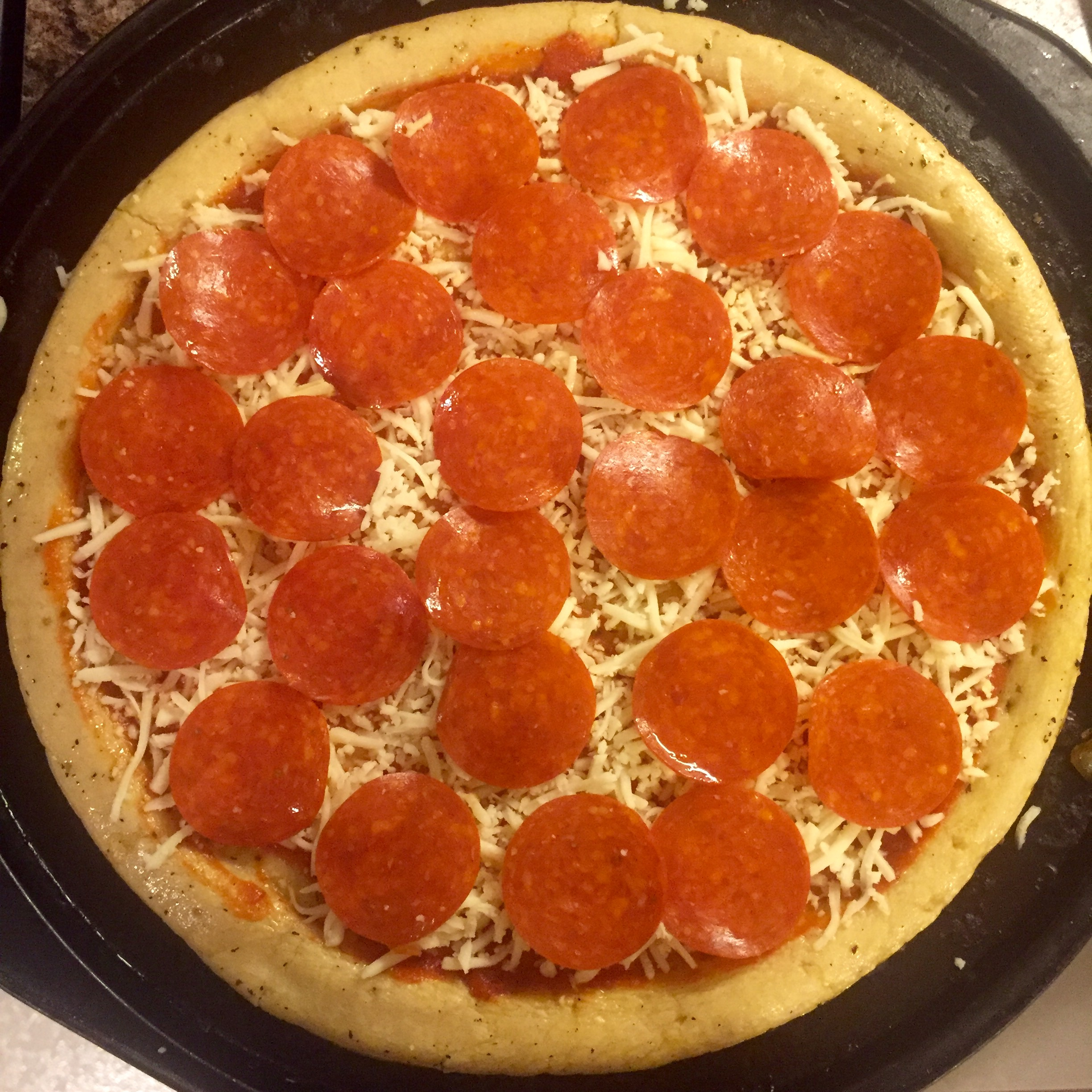
- Pepperoni topping on pizza, ready for the oven
- Place of origin: United States
- Main ingredients: Pork, beef
- Ingredients generally used: Spices
- Food energy (per 100 g serving): 460 kcal (1,900 kJ)
Nutritional value
(per 100 g serving)
- Protein: 23 g
- Fat: 40.2 g
- Carbohydrate: 4 g

Pepperoni is an American variety of spicy salami made from cured pork and beef seasoned with paprika and chili peppers.

Before cooking, pepperoni is characteristically soft, slightly smoky, and bright red. Sliced pepperoni is one of the most popular pizza toppings in American pizzerias.

Traditional pepperoni with natural casing curls into "cups" in the pizza oven's intense heat. Commercialization of the production of pepperoni with the casing removed created slices that lay flat on the pizza. The curled "cup and char" style of pepperoni remains popular in some cities.

== Etymology ==
The term pepperoni is a borrowing of peperoni, the plural of peperone, the Italian word for bell pepper. The first use of pepperoni to refer to a sausage dates to 1916 at the latest. In Italian, the word peperoncino refers to a chili pepper.

== History ==
The first printed mention of pepperoni was in 1888 in the Times of London. In 1919 it was mentioned as being available in New York City. It is a cured dry sausage, with similarities to the spicy salamis of southern Italy on which it is based, such as salsiccia or soppressata. The main differences are that pepperoni is less spicy, has a finer grain (akin to spiceless salami from Milan), is usually softer in texture, and is usually produced with the use of an artificial casing.

== Production ==
Pepperoni, pork
Nutritional value per 100 g (3.5 oz)
- Energy: 1,940 kJ (460 kcal)
- Carbohydrates: 4 g
- Fat: 40.2 g
- Protein: 20.35 g
- ^{†}Percentages estimated using US recommendations for adults.

Pepperoni is made from pork or from a mixture of pork and beef. Turkey meat is also commonly used as a substitute, but the use of poultry in pepperoni must be appropriately labeled in the United States. It is typically seasoned with paprika or other chili pepper.

Prior to cooking, pepperoni is characteristically soft, slightly smoky, and bright red. Curing with nitrates or nitrites (usually used in modern curing agents to protect against botulism and other forms of microbiological decay) also contributes to pepperoni's reddish color, by reacting with heme in the myoglobin of the proteinaceous components of the meat.

== Serving ==
Sliced pepperoni is one of the most popular pizza toppings in American pizzerias. According to Convenience Store Decisions, in 2009 Americans consumed 251.7 million pounds (114.2 million kilograms) of pepperoni annually, on 36% of all pizzas produced nationally.

Pepperoni is also used as the filling of the pepperoni roll, a popular regional snack in West Virginia and neighboring areas.

In the Canadian province of Nova Scotia, deep fried pepperoni served on its own (usually with a honey mustard dipping sauce) is common pub food.

== Cup and char ==
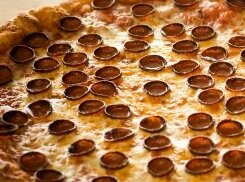
Cup and char pepperoni

Pepperoni has a tendency to curl up from the edges in the heat of a pizza oven; historically, all pepperonis showed at least some of this tendency to curl in the oven.

As commercial suppliers became the main suppliers to pizza shops, they developed a sausage stuffing technique that resulted in a pepperoni that does not curl. An additional benefit of non-curling pepperoni is that it eliminates the small deposits of hot grease that formed in the cupped pepperoni, therefore also eliminating any possible liability for customers who burn themselves on it.

The original style became known as "cup and char" pepperoni and remains popular in parts of the Midwest and Great Lakes areas, particularly around Cleveland, Ohio, and Buffalo, New York, and regained popularity in other areas in the 2010s. It is more expensive to produce.

== See also ==
- List of sausages
