= Tavern-style pizza =

Pizza with thin, crunchy crust and square slices

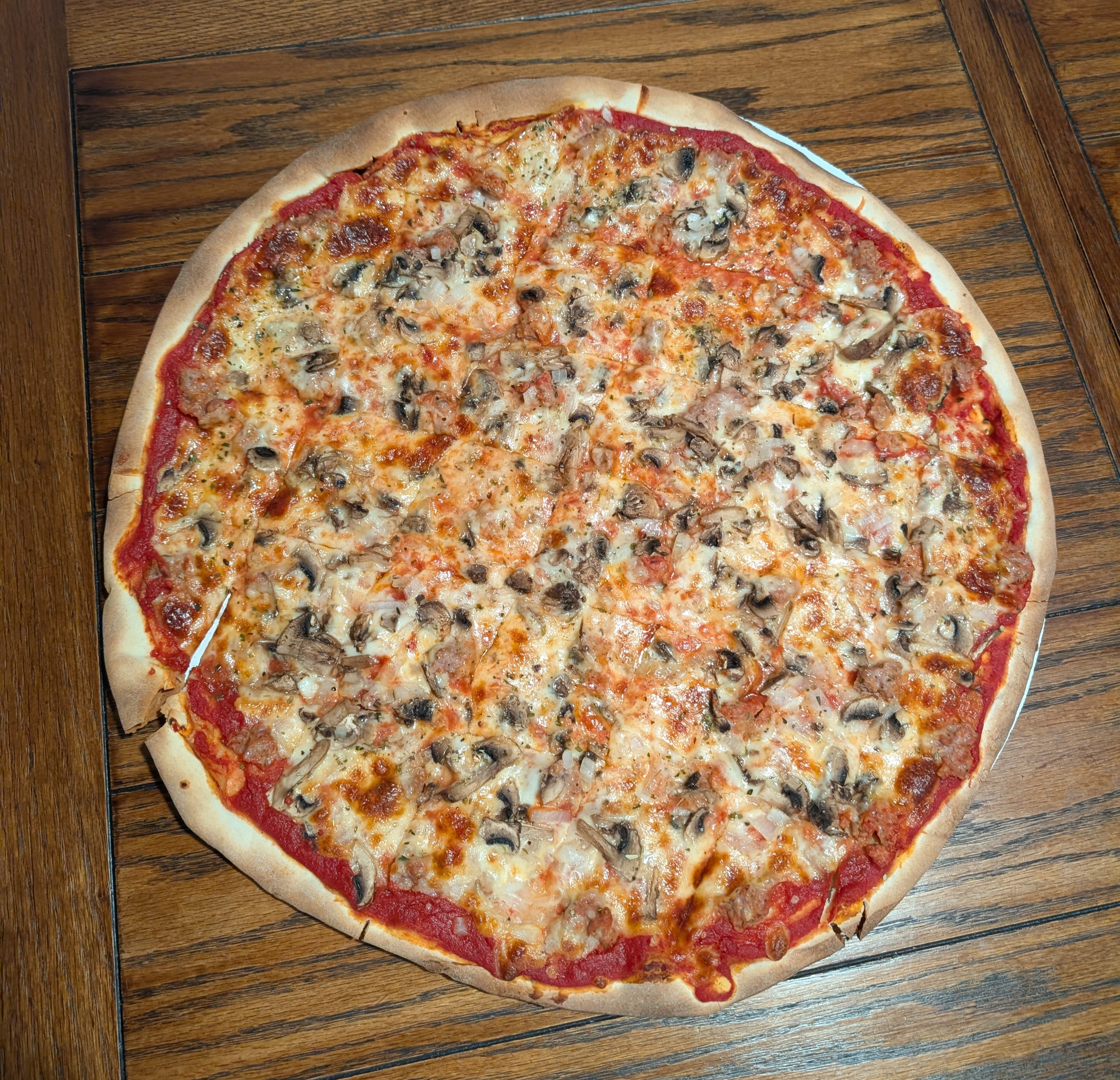
Tavern-style pizza from Caradaro Club in Milwaukee, Wisconsin

Tavern-style pizza, also known as party cut or thin crust, (Note: Various other names exist, especially combinations of some or all the words "Chicago," "tavern," "style," and "thin crust.") is a type of pizza that has both a thin crust firm enough to have a noticeable crunch and slices cut into squares, as opposed to wedges.

== Nomenclature ==
The name "tavern style" as an umbrella term for this style of pizza likely emerged from early- or mid-2000s Chicago internet forums. Its use expanded into media outlets in the 2010s and became widespread after that—although not without some controversy, including over 170,000 members in a Facebook group devoted to its dislike of the term.

Prior to the 2000s, tavern-style pizza was often just called "pizza," "thin crust," or other more local names. Tony Troiano, the owner of a Chicago pizza restaurant, told Block Club Chicago in 2026 that "tavern was never a style. You never heard people say 'tavern-style' or really any kind of style. It was always a cut." Bill Rogers, a Northwestern University professor of American literature, posited that "tavern style" was a retronym, "invented to distinguish something old and traditional from something new, a variation on that original that becomes prominent."

== Characteristics ==
Although regional styles can vary, tavern-style pizzas across the Midwestern United States typically have a crispy and thin crust. In Milwaukee, this is referred to as a "cracker" crust; crusts on Minnesota-style pizza tend to be a bit softer. Unlike hand-tossed pizzas common on the east coast of the United States or in Italy, the dough is rolled out before baking.

Prior to cooking, the crust is topped with a seasoned tomato sauce, cheese, and toppings like sausage. Immediately prior to service, the pizzas are cut into squares instead of the classic triangle.

== History ==
=== Purpose ===
The name "tavern-style" comes from how the pizzas were originally served in taverns. According to at least one origin story, the pizza tempted customers into lingering at the establishment, at which point they would be more likely to order more alcohol. Other bars might serve peanuts or other salty snacks for the same purpose.

According to one narrative, the pizza's signature square slices were created so that a customer could hold that in one hand and a beer in the other. Another theory is that they made it possible for taverns without plates to instead set the pizza on napkins.

=== Creation ===
Claims to originating the style have come from residents of Milwaukee and of Chicago.

==== Milwaukee ====
Milwaukee's claim dates to a restaurant named Caradaro Club, which opened in 1945. It was the first establishment in the city to serve pizza. The classic story is that Caradaro's co-owner Joe Todaro and his wife Agatha married Neapolitan pizza's thin crust with Sicilian pizza's rectangle slices. They were influenced by Anthony Paterno, who sold Italian foods in Milwaukee and Chicago and baked pizza in the latter. He allowed Joe to look at his operations but would not give them a dough recipe. As a result, Todaro's wife innovated Caradaro's especially thin and crispy crust, which by 2026 measured about 1.5 millimetres (0.059 in) thick. Caradaro then popularized their pizza by handing out free individual square slices to people walking by the restaurant.

Of those pizzas, Todaro's son later recalled:

My father used cake flour because it was finer. It had yeast, and he put baker's malt into it for the flavor and he used lard and olive oil. The consistency of the crust was a little bit more than crackers but it was flaky and it had a nice flavor. We didn’t make round pizza, they were oblong and you’d cut them into squares. ... And sauce (was) crushed tomatoes with, if they put anything in it, salt. You put a little oregano on and mozzarella cheese goes over that. And then on top of the mozzarella cheese, you put toppings, and in those days all we had was pepperoni and sausage, olives, mushrooms and onions. The guy ... that was making the sausage for us, he used pork butts (and) my father was very particular about how much fat was in them.

==== Chicago ====
Restaurants in Chicago may have begun serving something like tavern-style pizza beginning in the 1930s. At the least, people were consuming thin- or thinner-crust pizzas from places like Granato's Pizzeria Napolitana. However, Chicago reporter Monica Eng found that a contemporary Chicago Tribune article described Granato's pizza as having an English muffin-like crust, which she believed would be a much "spongier texture" than the later thin tavern style.

Today, a number of individual Chicago restaurants have claims to originating the style between 1946 and 1950. Eng hypothesized that the first tavern-style pizza in Chicago was baked in 1946 by the-then Vito's Tavern, later renamed to Vito and Nick's Pizzeria. Rose George, the owner of the restaurant as of 2023, has stated that her father got the idea during his military service in Italy during World War II. He wrote home to his mother and asked if she could create a thin crust for what would become the restaurant's pizza.

Another contender for the first tavern-style pizza in Chicago is the Home Run Inn in South Lawndale, which opened in 1947. Eng identified at least four additional restaurants that could have originated the style: Italian Fiesta in Hyde Park, Father and Son in Logan Square, Marie's Pizza and Liquor in Albany Park, and Candlelite in Rogers Park.

=== Elsewhere ===
Many other tavern-style pizza establishments also opened in the US Midwest in the 1940s. Notable examples include:

- Wells Brothers in Racine, Wisconsin, which started using a thin crust pizza with cornmeal on the bottom in that decade
- Riverside Pizza in Iron River, Michigan, established in 1946 and known for making pizzas with a "sweet and tangy" sauce; they have been voted as the best pizzas in the state's Upper Peninsula

== Regional varieties ==
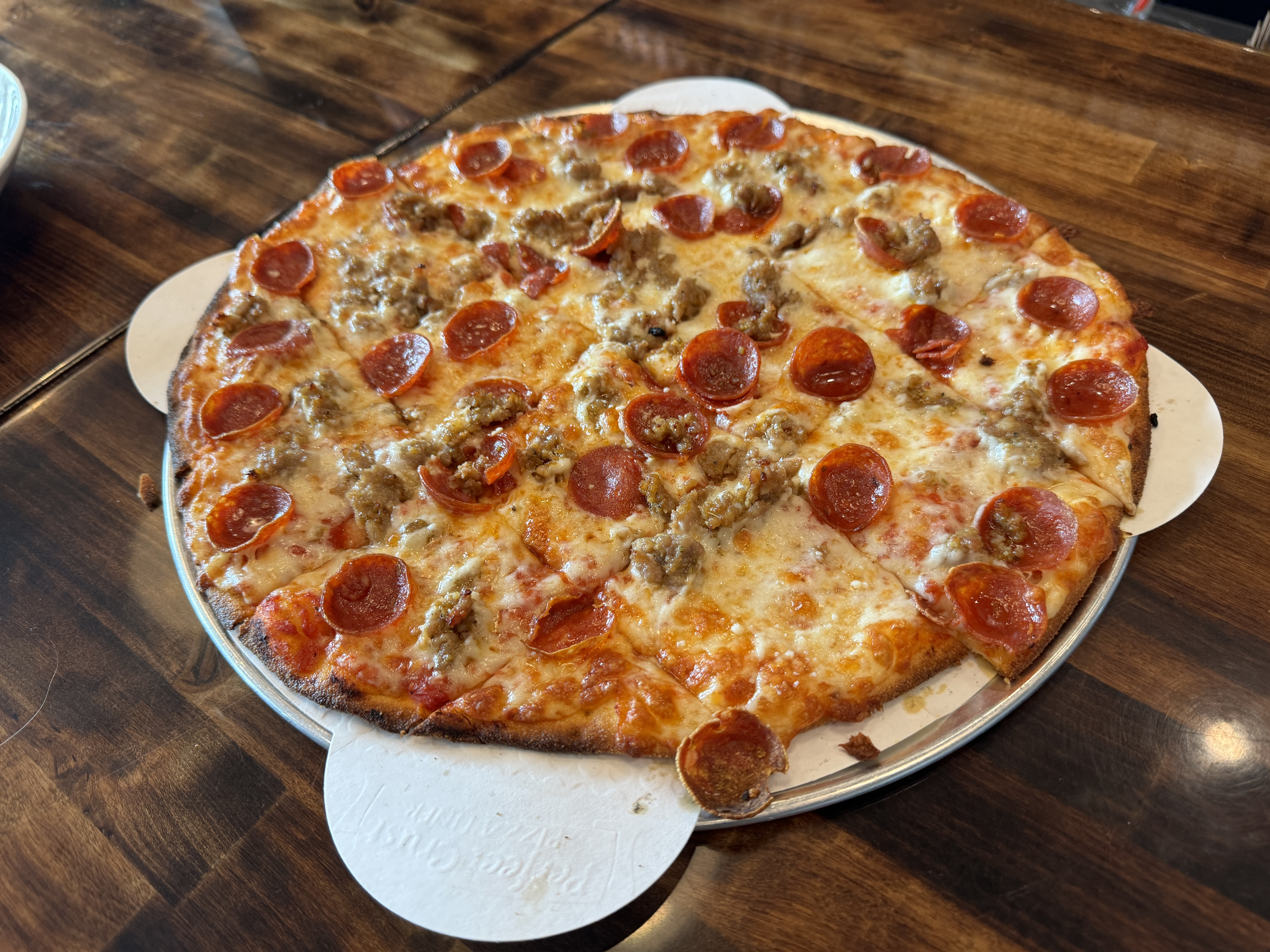
A tavern-style pizza made in California

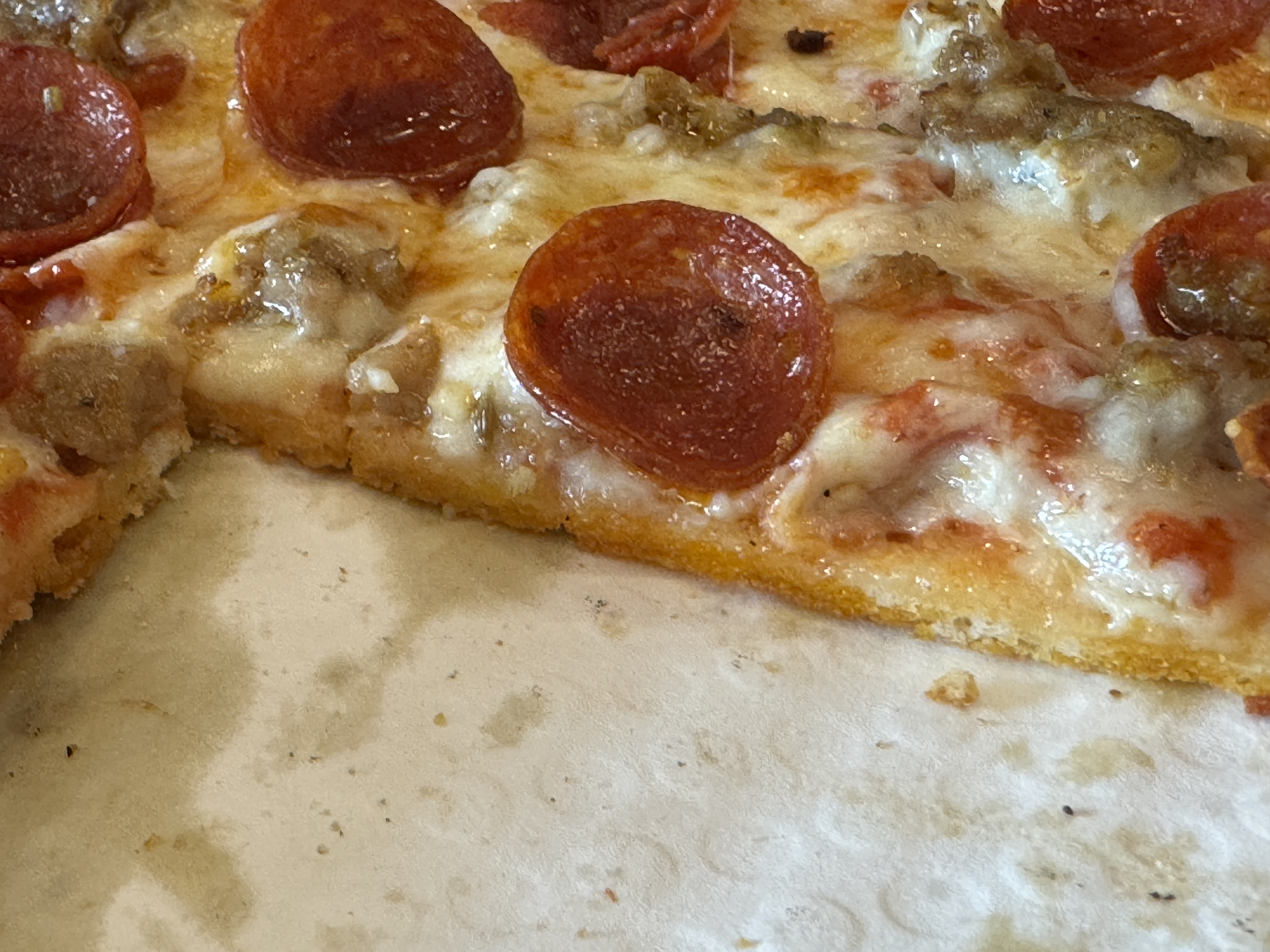
A close-up of one slice

Chicago hosts the iconic variety of tavern-style pizza, but several regional varieties exist, all of which retain the thin crust:

- St. Louis-style pizza is cut into squares, made with Provel cheese, somewhat sweet tomato sauce, and an especially crispy crust.
- Minnesota-style pizza is cut into squares, with hearty toppings, a generous amount of cheese, and somewhat spicy tomato sauce; the crusts can also be a bit softer
- Columbus-style pizza has as many toppings as can fit on the pizza.
- Milwaukee-style pizza shares most of its characteristics with Chicago, but it has a thinner cracker-like crust, may be oval-shaped, and may use Wisconsin's brick cheese. Its classic toppings are sausage, onion, and mushrooms.

Lesser-cited varieties include Dayton, Ohio, which uses unsweetened tomato sauce.

== Sales ==
Tavern-style pizza is commonly found in restaurants across much of the Midwestern United States. Its popularity widened across the United States in the 2020s. The expansion included tavern-style releases from the US restaurant chains Pizza Hut and Domino's, in addition to the Tombstone frozen pizza brand.

A number of sources have said that tavern-style pizza outsells deep-dish pizza in Chicago. According to 2013 Grubhub data and the company Chicago Pizza Tours, thin-crust pizza outsells the more widely known deep-dish style among locals, with GrubHub stating that deep-dish comprises only 9% of its pizza deliveries. In response, Technomics food industry researcher Darren Tristano questioned GrubHub's conclusion on the basis of the delivery service's user demographics, saying that its younger users cannot afford deep-dish pizza, while NPR noted that the data would not include information on two particular chains specializing in the style (though with just 20 restaurants in the city of 2.7 million) that are not on GrubHub. In 2020 COVID-affected data, Yelp also found that thin-crust pizza was more popular in Chicago. However, Food & Wine magazine spoke to multiple Chicago pizzerias in 2024 whose sales of the two styles of pizza were evenly split.
