= History of pizza =

The history of pizza began in antiquity, as various ancient cultures produced flatbreads with several toppings. Pizza today is an Italian dish with a flat dough-based base and toppings, with significant Italian roots in history.

A precursor of pizza was probably the focaccia, a flatbread known to the Romans as panis focacius, to which toppings were then added. Modern pizza evolved from similar flatbread dishes in Naples, Italy, between the 16th and mid-18th century.

The word pizza was first documented in 997 CE in Gaeta and successively in different parts of southern Italy. Furthermore, the Etymological Dictionary of the Italian Language explains the word pizza as coming from dialectal pinza, 'clamp', as in modern Italian pinze, 'pliers, pincers, tongs, forceps'. Their origin is from Latin pinsere, 'to pound, stamp'.

== Origins ==
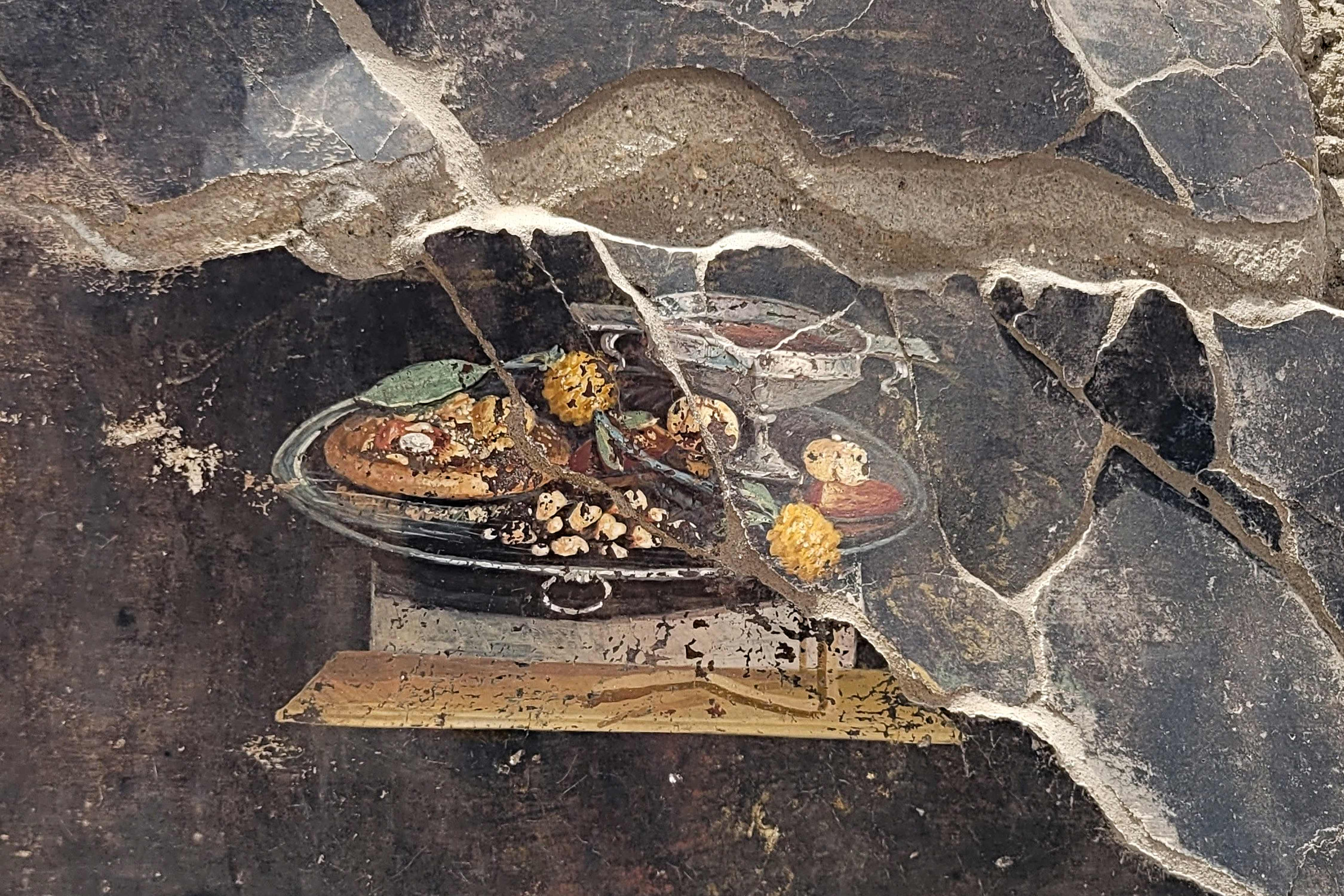
A fresco depicting an "adorea" style flat bread with various ingredients, from Pompeii

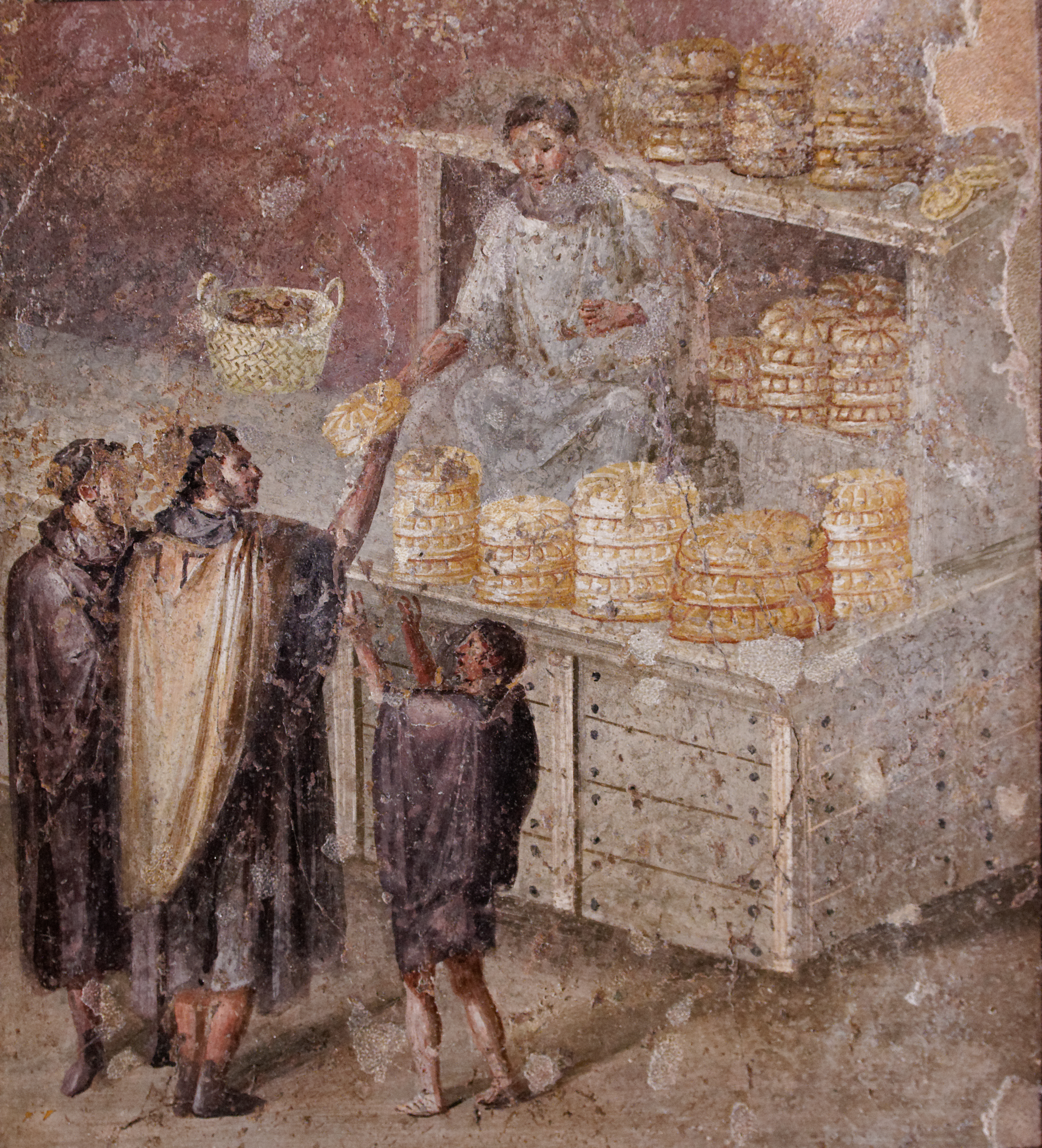
A Pompeii tablinum fresco of a Roman bread shop. In the top right corner, a smaller flatbread can be seen with a crust-like border. Such breads would have served as mensa ('table') breads for additional toppings.

Foods similar to pizza have been prepared since ancient times. References to pizza-like dishes appear throughout early history.

- In the 6th century BCE, Persian soldiers serving under Darius the Great baked flatbreads with cheese and dates on top of their battle shields.
- In ancient Greece, citizens made a flatbread called plakous (πλακοῦς, gen. πλακοῦντος – plakountos) which was flavored with toppings such as herbs, onion, cheese, and garlic. Another term for this type of flatbread was placentae (a term for pastries of flour, cheese, oil, and honey). They are mentioned by Athenaeus of Naucratis, a 2nd-century grammarian, who writes that they were topped with fruit puree called coulis and used as sacrificial offerings.
- One example of a Roman bread that was covered with numerous toppings (such as cheese spreads called moretum, and fruits) was called adorea or libum adoreum. These flat breads were made with wheat, honey, and oil. A painting of this ancient Roman food was found at Pompeii.

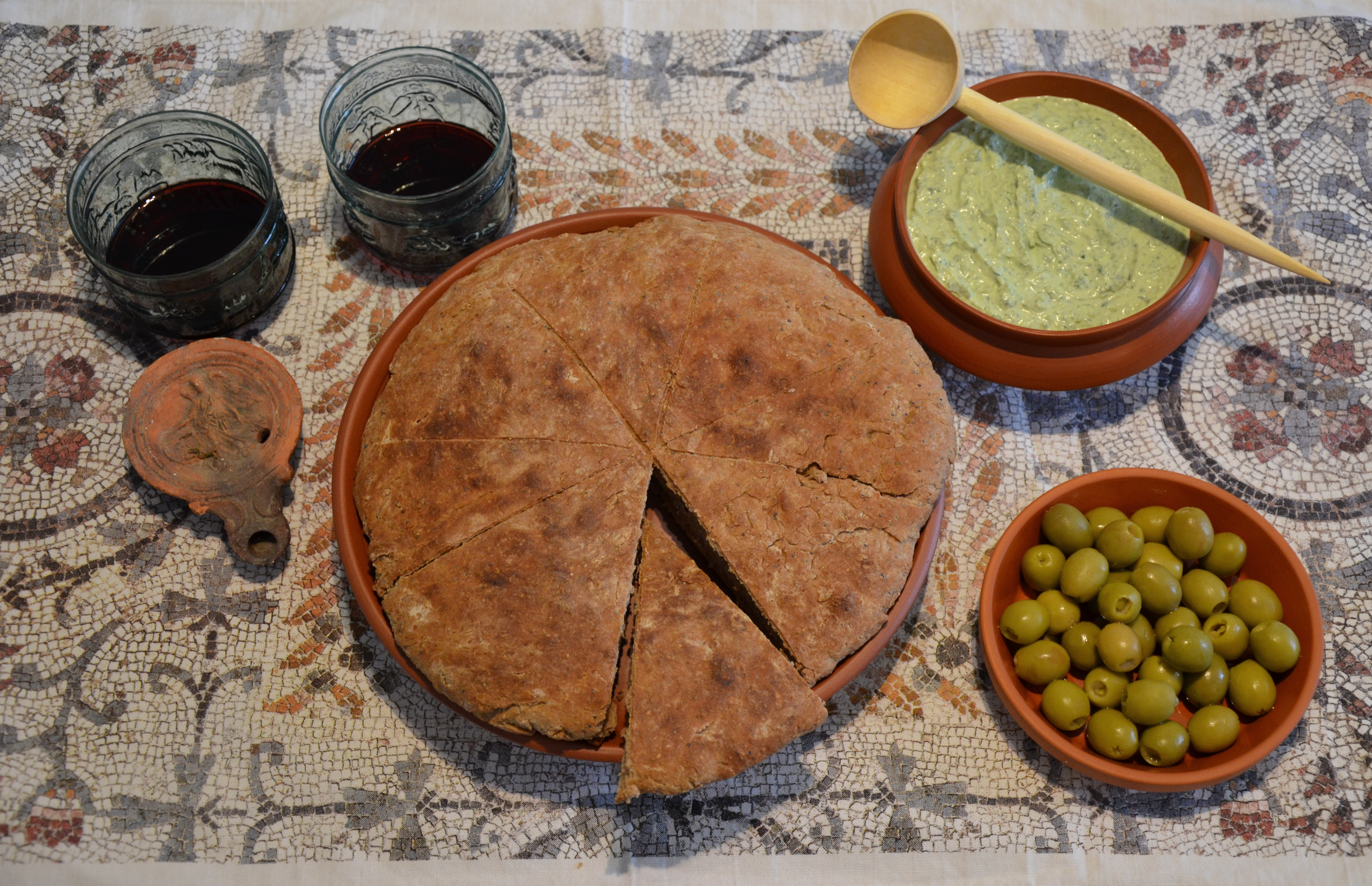
Modern reconstruction of Roman bread, and moretum (herb cheese spread)

Examples of other flatbreads that survive to this day from the ancient Mediterranean world include focaccia (which may date back as far as the ancient Etruscans); manakish in the Levant, coca (which has sweet and savory varieties) from Catalonia, Valencia, and the Balearic Islands; the Greek pita; lepinja in the Balkans; and piadina in the Romagna part of the Emilia-Romagna region of Italy.

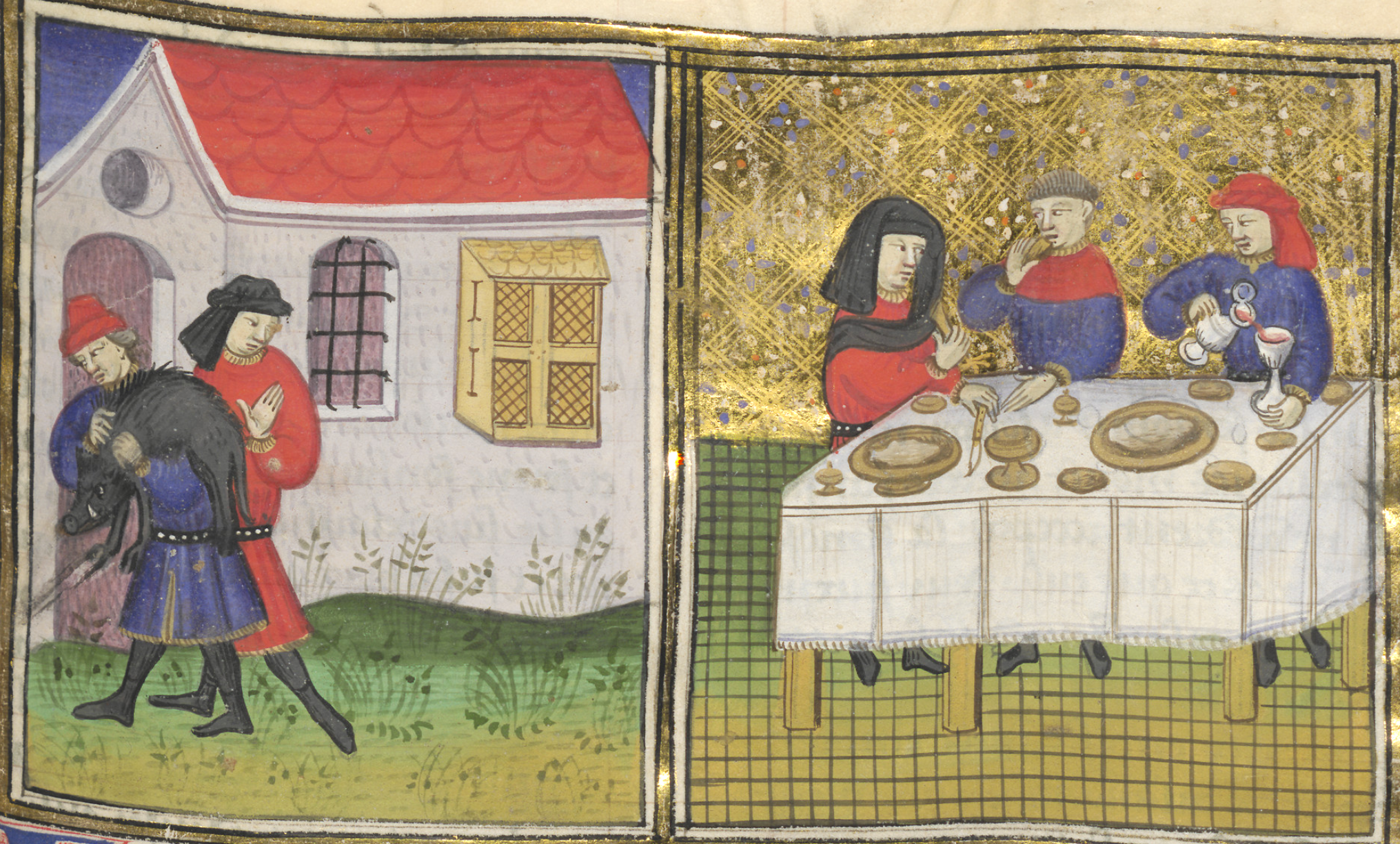
Illustration from a manuscript of the Decameron depicting galettes, c. 1425 and 1450

By the late Medieval and early modern eras, flatbreads, cakes or pastries eaten with toppings, such as galettes and cocas, were common throughout the Mediterranean region. In 16th-century Naples, some galettes were referred to as "pizza"; it was known as a dish for poor people, particularly as street food, and was not considered a kitchen recipe until much later. It was not until the Spanish brought the tomato from the Americas and developed the modern tomato that "pizzas" in their modern conception were invented. It is said that the tomato reached the Kingdom of Naples and Sicily, when it was part of the Spanish Empire, through either Pedro Álvarez de Toledo in the 16th century or viceroy Manuel de Amat, who may have gifted some seeds to the Neapolitans in 1770 on behalf of the Viceroyalty of Peru.

== Modern era ==
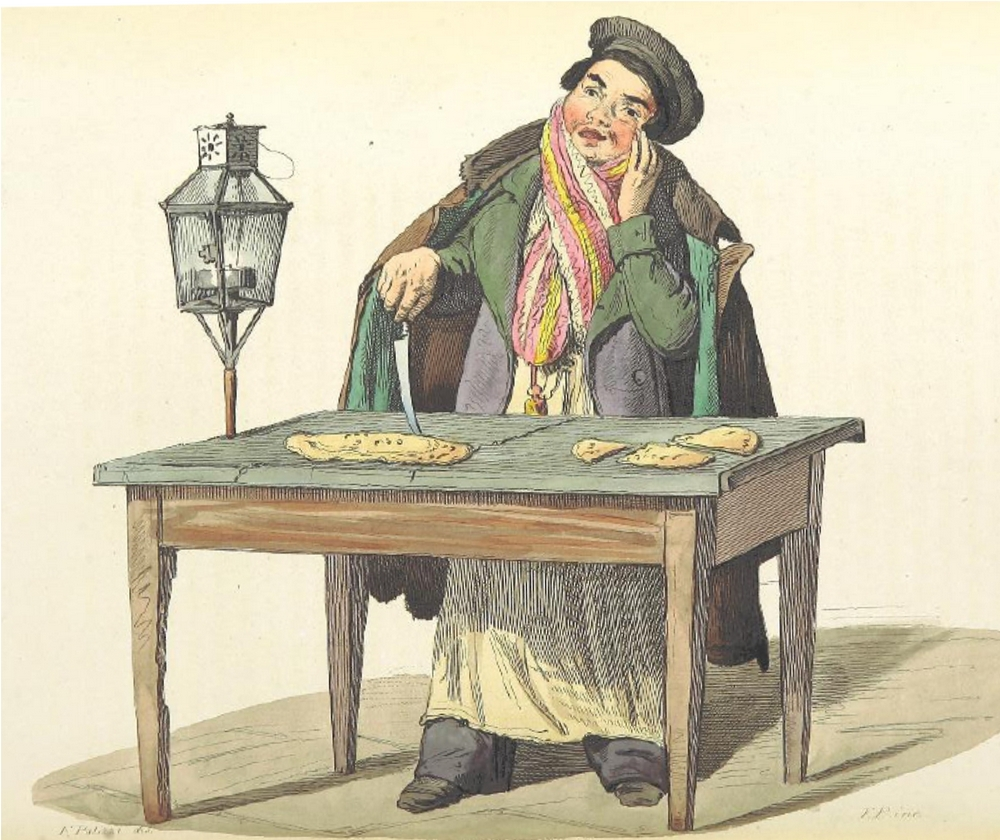
1858 illustration of a pizzaiolo selling his wares

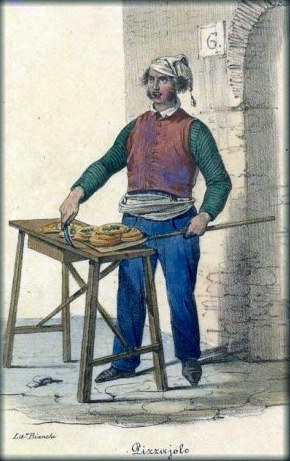
An illustration from 1830 of a pizzaiolo in Naples

In 1843, Alexandre Dumas described the diversity of pizza toppings.

An often recounted story holds that on June 11, 1889, to honor the queen consort of Italy, Margherita of Savoy, the Neapolitan pizza maker Raffaele Esposito created the "pizza Margherita", a pizza garnished with tomatoes, mozzarella, and basil, to represent the national colors of Italy as on the flag of Italy. But the pizza Margherita already existed: "The most popular and famous pizzas from Naples were the 'Marinara', created in 1734, and the 'Margherita', which dates from 1796–1810. The latter was presented to the Queen of Italy upon her visit to Naples in 1889, specifically on account of the colour of its seasoning (tomato, mozzarella, and basil), which are reminiscent of the colours of the Italian flag." Later research casts further doubt on this legend, also undermining the authenticity of the letter of recognition, pointing that no media of the period reported about the supposed visit and that the story was first promoted in the 1930s–1940s.

In 1830, a certain "Riccio", had described a pizza with tomatoes, mozzarella, and basil in the book Napoli, contorni e dintorni.

Emmanuele Rocco described in 1849 the main types of pizza, today called marinara, Margherita, and calzone in Francesco De Bourcard's second volume of Usi e costumi di Napoli e contorni descritti e dipinti:

The most ordinary pizza, called coll'aglio e l'olio (lit. 'with garlic and oil'), is dressed with oil, and over it is spread, as well as salt, origanum and garlic cloves shredded minutely (optionally). Others can be covered in grated cheese and dressed with lard, and then they put on a few leaves of basil. Over the former is often added (depending on the region) some small seafish; on the latter some thin slices of mozzarella. Sometimes they use slices of prosciutto, tomato, arselle, etc. Sometimes folding the dough over itself to form what is called calzone.

— Francesco de Bourcard, Usi e costumi di Napoli e contorni descritti e dipinti, Vol. II, p. 124

Slowly the flatbread with toppings started to be appreciated by all social classes, although initially it was produced by bakeries and meant to be eaten while walking. In the first decades of the 19th century this changed with the opening of the first pizzerias with tables in Naples. The first was Antica Pizzeria Port'Alba in 1830, followed by the opening of Le stanze di Piazza Carità (today Mattozzi) by Antonio la Vecchia in largo della Carità in 1833. The scholar and minister of public instruction Francesco de Sanctis describes the latter in his memoirs as the place he used to go eat pizza with his friends when he was 16:

In the evening we sometimes went to eat pizza in the stanze at largo della Carità.

— Francesco De Sanctis, La giovinezza di Francesco de Sanctis: frammento autobiografico, p. 39

Pizza evolved into a variety of bread and tomato dish often served with cheese. Until the late 19th or early 20th century, the dish was often sweet, not exclusively savory, and earlier versions that were savory resembled the flatbreads now known as schiacciata. Pellegrino Artusi's classic early-20th-century cookbook, La scienza in cucina e l'arte di mangiar bene gives three recipes for pizza, all of which are sweet. After the feedback of some readers, Artusi added a typed sheet in the 1911 edition (discovered by food historian Alberto Capatti), bound with the volume, with the recipe of pizza alla napoletana: mozzarella, tomatoes, anchovies, and mushrooms. By 1927, Ada Boni's first edition of Il talismano della felicità (a well-known Italian cookbook) includes a recipe using tomatoes and mozzarella.

== Innovation ==
By the late 18th century, it was common for the poor of the area around Naples to add tomato to their yeast-based flatbread, thus the pizza began.

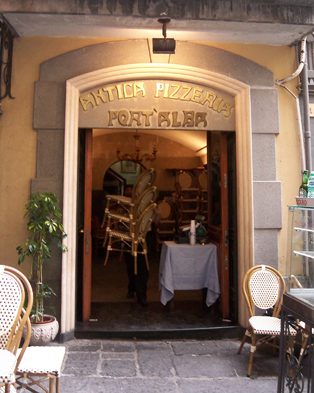
Antica Pizzeria Port'Alba in Naples, which is the world's first pizzeria

According to documents discovered by historian Antonio Mattozzi in the State Archive of Naples, in 1807, 54 pizzerias existed; listed were owners and addresses. In the second half of the 19th century the number of pizzerias increased to 120.

In Naples, two other figures connected to the trade existed—the pizza hawker (pizzaiuolo ambulante), who sold pizza but did not make it, and the seller of pizza a ogge a otto, who made pizzas and sold them in return for a payment for seven days.

The pizza marinara method has a topping of tomato, oregano, garlic, and extra virgin olive oil. It is named marinara because it was traditionally prepared by the seaman's wife la marinara for her seafaring husband upon returning from fishing trips in the Bay of Naples.

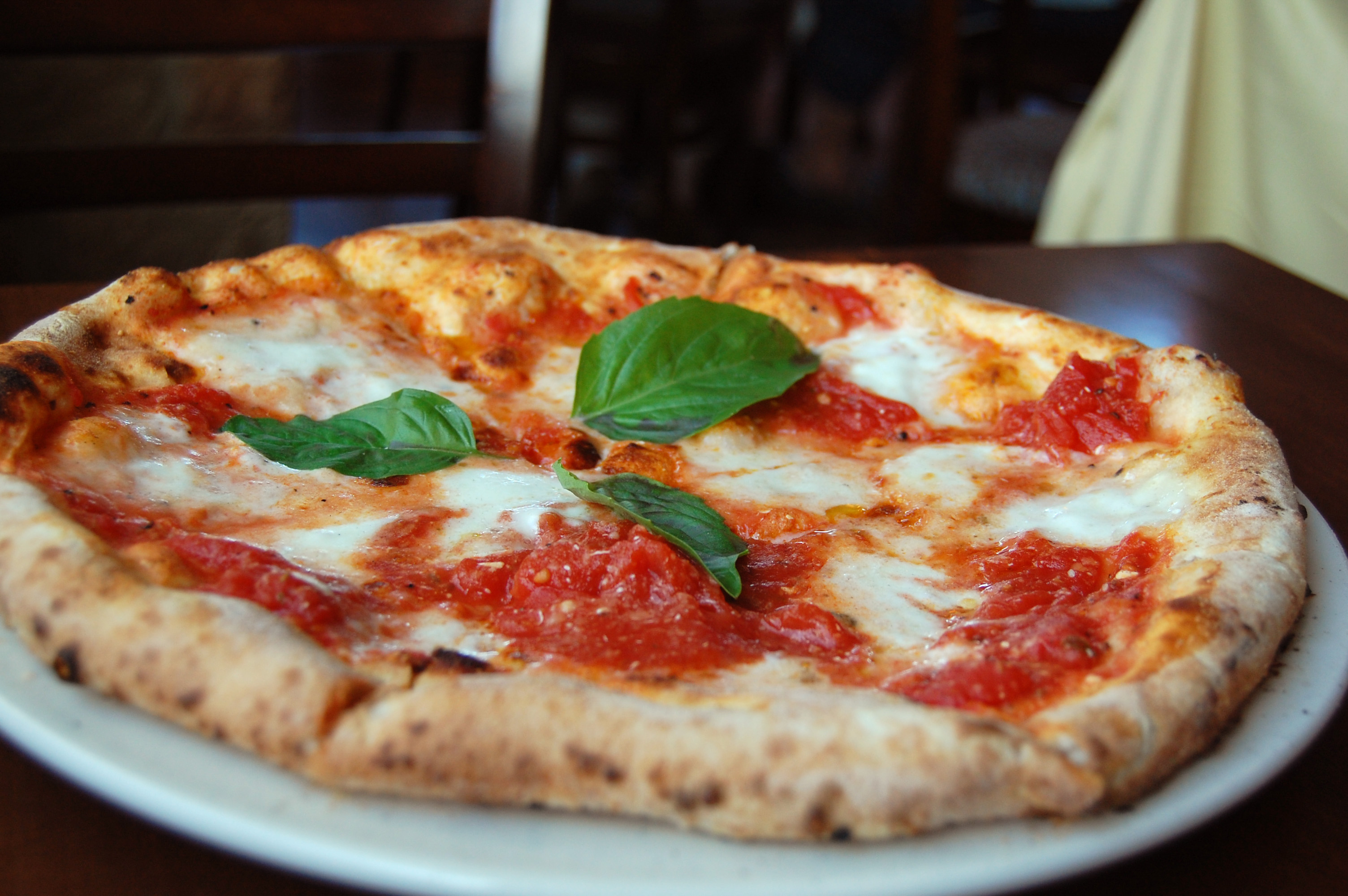
A pizza Margherita

Pizza Margherita is topped with modest amounts of tomato sauce, mozzarella, and fresh basil. It is widely attributed to baker Raffaele Esposito, who worked at the restaurant "Pietro... e basta così" ('Pietro... and that's enough'), established in 1880 and remaining in business as Pizzeria Brandi. Although recent research casts doubt on this legend, the tale holds that, in 1889, he baked three different pizzas for the visit of King Umberto I and Queen Margherita of Savoy. The Queen's favorite was a pizza evoking the colors of the Italian flag—green (basil leaves), white (mozzarella), and red (tomatoes). According to the tale, this combination was named pizza Margherita in her honor. Although those were the most preferred, there are many variations of pizzas today.

Associazione Verace Pizza Napoletana ('True Neapolitan Pizza Association'), which was founded in 1984, has set the very specific rules that must be followed for an authentic Neapolitan pizza. These include that the pizza must be baked in a wood-fired, domed oven; the base must be hand-kneaded and must not be rolled with a pin or prepared by any mechanical means (i pizzaioli—'the pizza makers'—make the pizza by rolling it with their fingers) and that the pizza must not exceed 35 centimetres in diameter or be more than one-third of a centimetre thick at the centre. The association also selects pizzerias globally to produce and spread the Associazione Verace Pizza Napoletana philosophy and method.

There are many famous pizzerias in Naples where these traditional pizzas can be found, such as Da Michele, Port'Alba, Brandi, Di Matteo, Sorbillo, Trianon, and Umberto. Most of them are in the ancient historical center of Naples. These pizzerias follow even stricter standards than the specified rules. For example, using only San Marzano tomatoes grown on the slopes of Mount Vesuvius and drizzling the olive oil and adding tomato topping in only a clockwise direction.

The pizza bases in Naples are soft and pliable. In Rome, they prefer a thin and crispy base. Another popular form of pizza in Italy is pizza al taglio, which is pizza baked in rectangular trays with a wide variety of toppings and sold by weight.

In December 2009, the pizza napoletana was granted Protected Designation of Origin (PDO) status by the European Union.

In 2012, the world's largest pizza was made in Los Angeles. It measured 1261.65 square meters in area.

In December 2017, the pizza napoletana was inscribed on the UNESCO Intangible Cultural Heritage Lists.

== Pizza outside Italy ==
=== Pizza in the United States ===
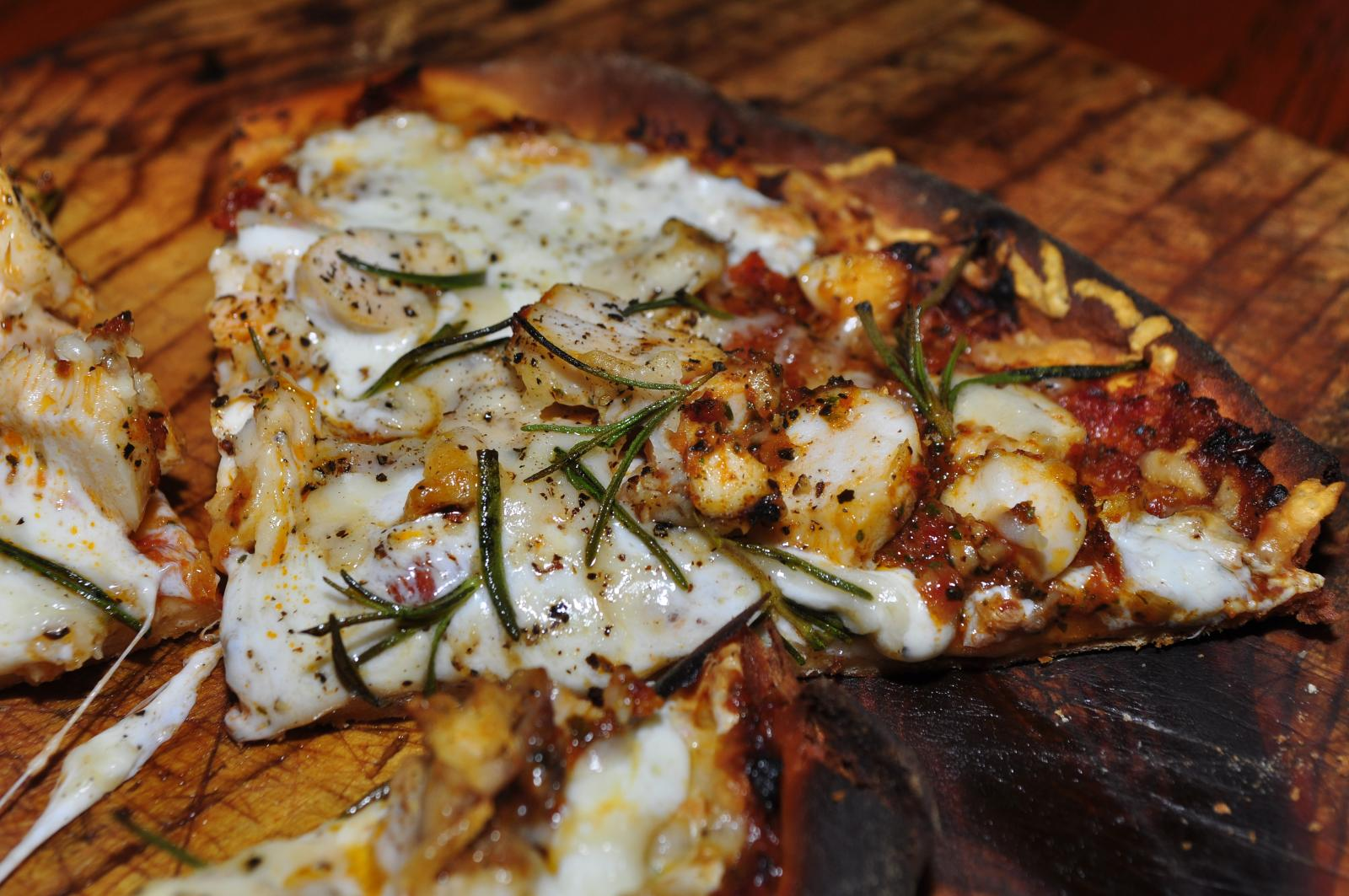
Pizza with roast chicken

Pizza first made its appearance in the United States with the arrival of Italian immigrants in the late 19th century.

Early printed references to pizza served in the US include a "pizzeria" in 1894, Filippo Milone establishment ads in New York City in 1903, a 1903 description of "pomidore pizza", and a 1904 article in The Boston Journal.

Hailing from Naples, Italy, Giovanni and Gennaro Bruno arrived in America in 1903 and introduced Boston to Neapolitan pizza. Their culinary legacy continued when Giovanni's son, Vincent Bruno, went on to establish Chicago's first pizzeria.

Gennaro Lombardi arrived in the United States in November 1904 and may have worked at the Spring Street pizzeria in 1905. Regas's reconstruction indicates that Lombardi owned it briefly in 1908, then repurchased it around 1918 and operated it until his death in 1958. The business later known as Lombardi's nevertheless became influential in New York pizza history. Its baker Anthony “Totonno” Pero left to open Totonno's in Coney Island in 1924.

Italian-American bakeries also adapted regional tray-baked products. In Philadelphia, tomato pie was sold by Italian bakeries from the early 20th century; its thick, spongy base is traced to Palermo's sfincione, with Iannelli's Bakery established in 1910 and Sarcone's Bakery in 1918. In New York, Sicilian pizza developed as a combination of Sicilian and Neapolitan topped-bread traditions, with locally available mozzarella added by immigrant bakeries. In Detroit, WDET reports that the sfincione recipe brought by Anna Guerra's Sicilian family inspired the Detroit-style pizza developed by Gus and Anna Guerra in 1946.

Pizza was brought to the Trenton area of New Jersey with Joe's Tomato Pies opening in 1910, followed soon by Papa's Tomato Pies in 1912. In 1936, De Lorenzo's Tomato Pies was opened. While Joe's Tomato Pies has closed, both Papa's and Delorenzo's have been run by the same families since their openings and remain among the most popular pizzas in the area. Frank Pepe Pizzeria Napoletana in New Haven, Connecticut, was another early pizzeria that opened in 1925 (after the owner served pies from local carts and bakeries for 20–25 years) and is famous for its New Haven–style Clam Pie. Frank Pepe's nephew Sal Consiglio opened a competing store, Sally's Apizza, on the other end of the block, in 1938. Both establishments are still run by descendants of the original family. When Sal died, over 2,000 people attended his wake, and The New York Times ran a half-page memoriam. The D'Amore family introduced pizza to Los Angeles in 1939. In Chicago, two entrepreneurs, Ike Sewell and Ric Riccardo, invented Chicago-style deep-dish pizza, in 1943. They opened their own restaurant on the corner of Wabash and Ohio, Pizzeria Uno.

Before the 1940s, in the US, pizza consumption was limited mostly to Italian Americans. Following World War II, veterans returning from the Italian Campaign, who were introduced to Italy's native cuisine, proved a ready market for pizza in particular. By the 1950s, it was popular enough to be featured in an episode of I Love Lucy. Once it had become fully naturalized in the U.S., its market expanded in two different directions: through neighborhood pizzerias and through pizza chains.

By the 1970s, neighborhood pizzerias, often run by Italian or (later) Greek immigrants, became a defining feature of life in cities and suburbs with significant ethnic-Italian populations, most notably around New York City, Philadelphia, Baltimore, and Chicago. Such pizza restaurants usually also sell subs; since the 1990s, gyros have also joined their standard repertoire. Competition among these small restaurants is quiet but intense, leading to an average level of quality that often surprises visitors from elsewhere in the U.S. and is a point of some regional pride.

Later restaurant chains in the dine-in pizza market were Bertucci's, Happy Joe's, Monical's Pizza, California Pizza Kitchen, Godfather's Pizza, and Round Table Pizza, as well as Domino's, Pizza Hut, Little Caesars, and Papa John's. Pizzas from take and bake pizzerias, and chilled or frozen pizzas from supermarkets make pizza readily available nationwide. 13% of the US population consumes pizza on any given day.

=== Pizza in Canada ===
Canada's first pizzeria opened in 1948, Pizzeria Napoletana in Montreal. The first pizza ovens started entering the country in the late 1950s; it gained popularity throughout the 1960s, with many pizzerias and restaurants opening across the country.

Some of Canada's pizza brands include Boston Pizza and Pizza Pizza. Boston Pizza, also known as BP's in Canada, and "Boston's – the Gourmet Pizza" in the United States and Mexico, is one of Canada's largest franchising restaurants. The brand has opened over 325 locations across Canada and 50 locations in Mexico and the US. The first Boston Pizza location was opened in Edmonton, Alberta, in 1964, and operated under the name "Boston Pizza & Spaghetti House", with locations still opening across the nation.

Pizza Pizza, and its subsidiary chain Pizza 73 in Western Canada, are among Canada's largest domestic brands based in Ontario. To date, they have over 500 locations nationwide and fill more than 29 million orders annually.

== See also ==
- Food history
- Pizza effect
- Pizza in China
