= Ooni (company) =

Scottish designer and distributor of pizza ovens

Ooni Pizza Ovens
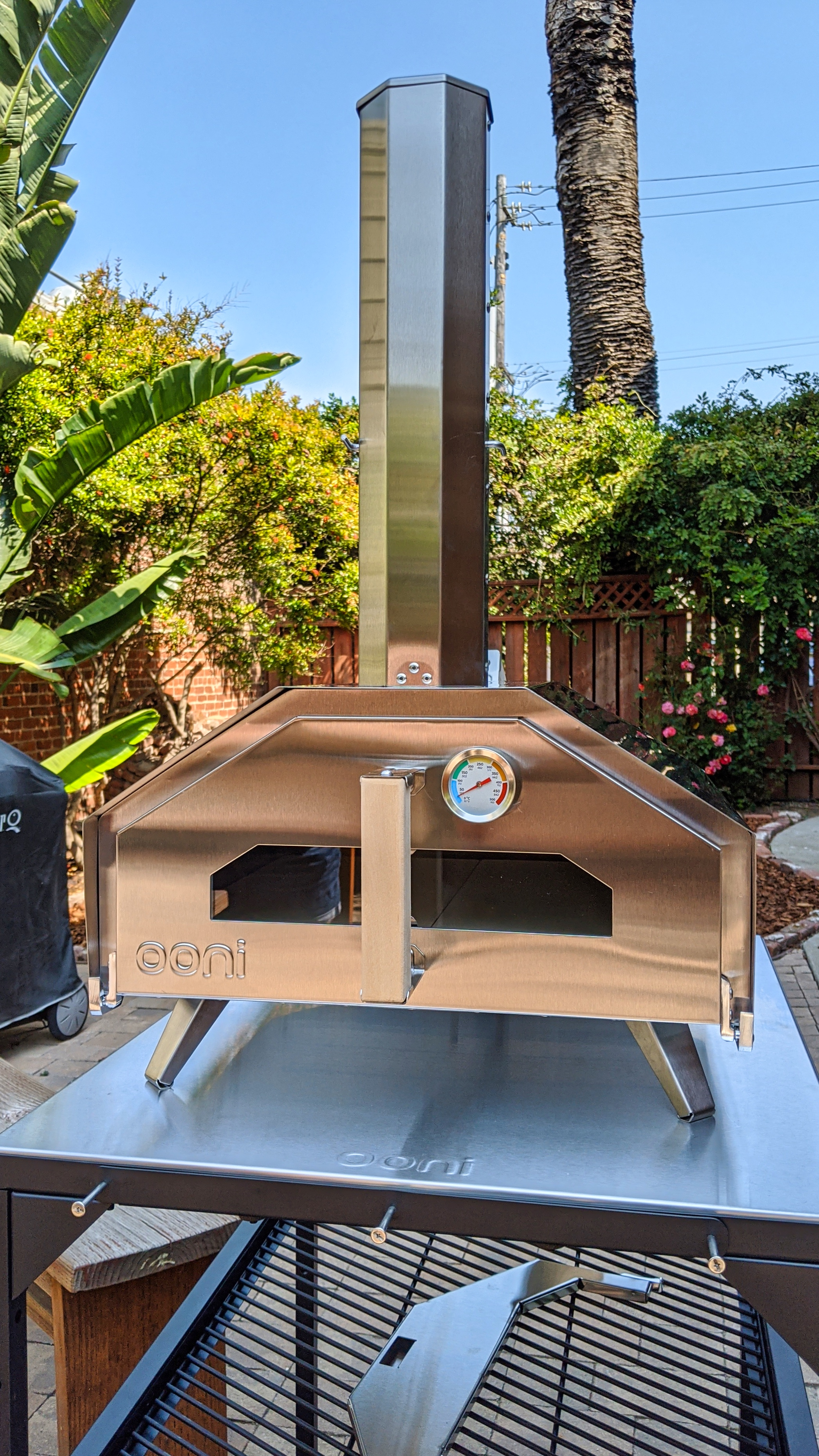
- An Ooni pizza oven
- Formerly: Uuni
- Type: Private
- Founded: 2012
- Founders: Kristian Tapaninaho and Darina Garland
- Headquarters: Edinburgh, Scotland, UK
- Products: Multi-fuel pizza ovens and range of other cooking equipment
- Brands: Ooni
- Website: ooni.com

Ooni is an outdoor pizza oven company based in Edinburgh, Scotland. Ooni launched the world's first portable wood-pellet fired pizza oven in 2012. Ooni specialises in high-temperature outdoor pizza ovens for residential customers.

== History ==
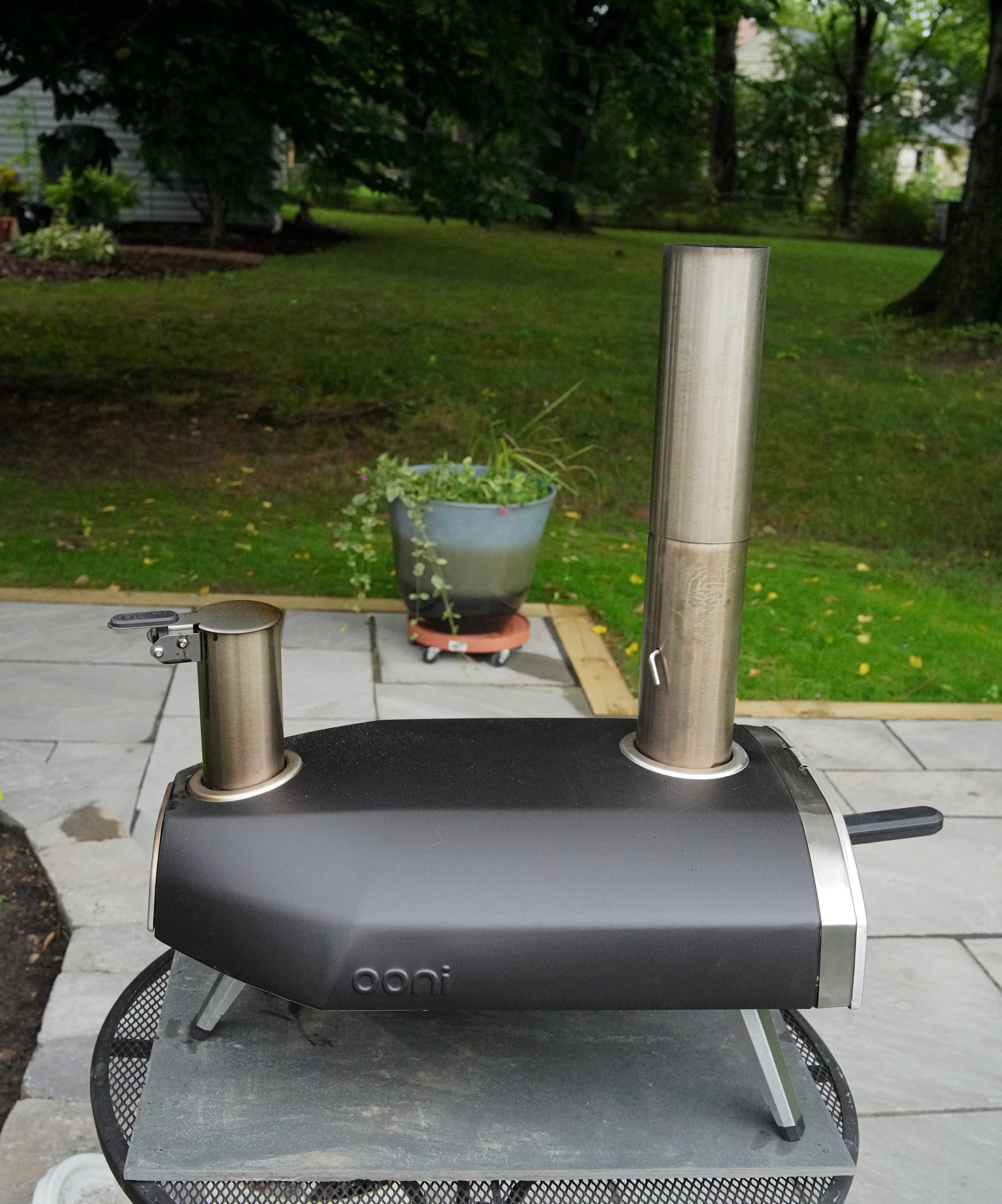
Ooni pizza oven, side view

The company was founded in 2012 by husband-and-wife team Kristian Tapaninaho, a native of Finland, and Darina Garland.

The company was formed around Tapaninaho’s invention of the world's first portable and affordable wood-fired oven used for cooking pizzas and other foodstuffs suitable for high-temperature baking, up to 500 °C (932 °F). Ooni has won several awards, including the Retailers’ Choice Award at Glee Birmingham 2015.

== Products ==
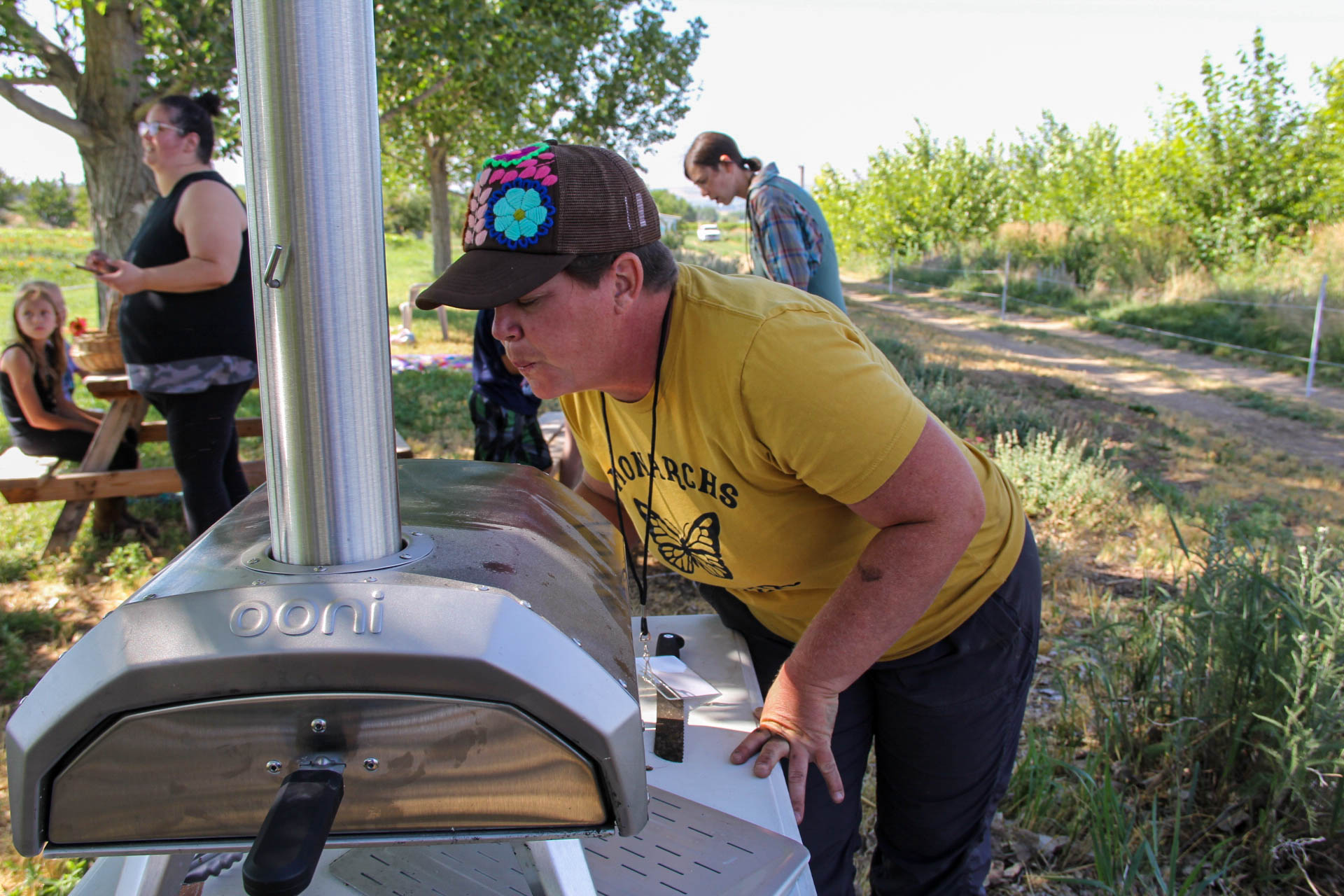
Pizza oven used by summer camp staff

The original Ooni was launched on Kickstarter in 2012. Since then, the company has had a number of other product launches on crowdfunding platforms.

The company has launched several variations on the original Ooni oven, and the current model is called Fyra 12 - a wood-pellet-fired oven which heats up to 500 °C (932 °F) in 10 minutes and cooks a 12-inch Neapolitan-style pizza in 60 seconds.

In April 2017, Ooni launched an Indiegogo campaign for its larger Ooni Pro model, a 'quad fueled' outdoor pizza oven capable of cooking 16-inch pizzas with wood, charcoal, gas or wood pellets for fuel. The Indiegogo campaign for Ooni Pro raised over $1 million, and the Ooni Pro was launched to customers in November 2017.

On 26 February 2019 Ooni introduced the Ooni Koda, a gas-powered portable pizza oven capable of reaching 500 °C (932 °F) and cooking pizzas in 60 seconds. Ooni Koda received the Hearth, Patio & Barbeque Association 2019 VESTA Award for Best Innovative Product and the National Hardware Show Retailer's Choice Award 2019, and was a 2019 Chelsea Flower Show Awards Finalist.

On 27 August 2019 Ooni launched a new Kickstarter campaign for the Ooni Karu.

On 4 March 2020, Ooni introduced the Ooni Koda 16. Around this time, Ooni started using numbers at the end of each of their oven models to represent the size of pizza that can be cooked in each oven.

On 16 June 2021, Ooni launched Ooni Karu 16. The oven became the first (and so far only) pizza oven to be 'Recommended for Domestic Use' by the Associazione Vera Pizza Napoletana (AVPN).

On 2 March 2023, Ooni introduced the Ooni Karu 12G, marking the first time the company used a letter after a model number to indicate specialty features, in this case, improved gas efficiency.

On 1 January 2025, Ooni introduced its first spiral dough mixer, the Ooni Halo Pro. Begin of sales is scheduled to 8 April 2025.

== Employees and headquarters ==
The company today employs around 350 people at its headquarters at Edinburgh in Scotland, Austin, Texas and Bonn, Germany, as well as staff in other countries.

== Name change ==
On 17 July 2018 the company officially changed its name to Ooni from its previous name of Uuni. 'Uuni' means 'oven' in Finnish.
