= Marinara =

Marinara may refer to:

- Pizza marinara, traditional recipe for Neapolitan pizza
- Marinara sauce, traditional Italian sauce
- Marinara (TV series), 2004 Philippine television series
