= Acunto Forni =

Italian pizza oven manufacturer

- Founded: 1892 in Naples, Italy
- Products: Wood-fired oven
- Website: acunto.it

Acunto Forni is an Italian artisanal pizza oven manufacturer based in Naples, Italy. It was founded in 1892 by Vincenzo Acunto and is currently operated by Gianni Acunto.

The company's brick ovens continue to be built by hand according to Neapolitan tradition. They are approved by the Associazione Verace Pizza Napoletana non-profit organization for the protection and preservation of the Neapolitan pizza heritage supported by the Neapolitan and Italian government.

== History ==
Vincenzo Acunto began manufacturing commercial cooking equipment appliances in Naples during the 1890s. He was recognized in 1906 at the Milan International for high quality in oven manufacturing and awarded the gold medal.

He continued to manufacture ovens in Naples over the course of the 20th century, using the same techniques and methods. In the latter part of the 20th century, Gianni Acunto formally took over the business, still located at the workshop on 20 Via Federico Persico, Naples.

Acunto Forni ovens have been exported around the world, including in the United States, Canada, Japan, Australia, the United Arab Emirates, the United Kingdom, France, and Germany.

== See also ==
- Pizza oven
