= Sicilian pizza =

Style of thick-crusted pizza

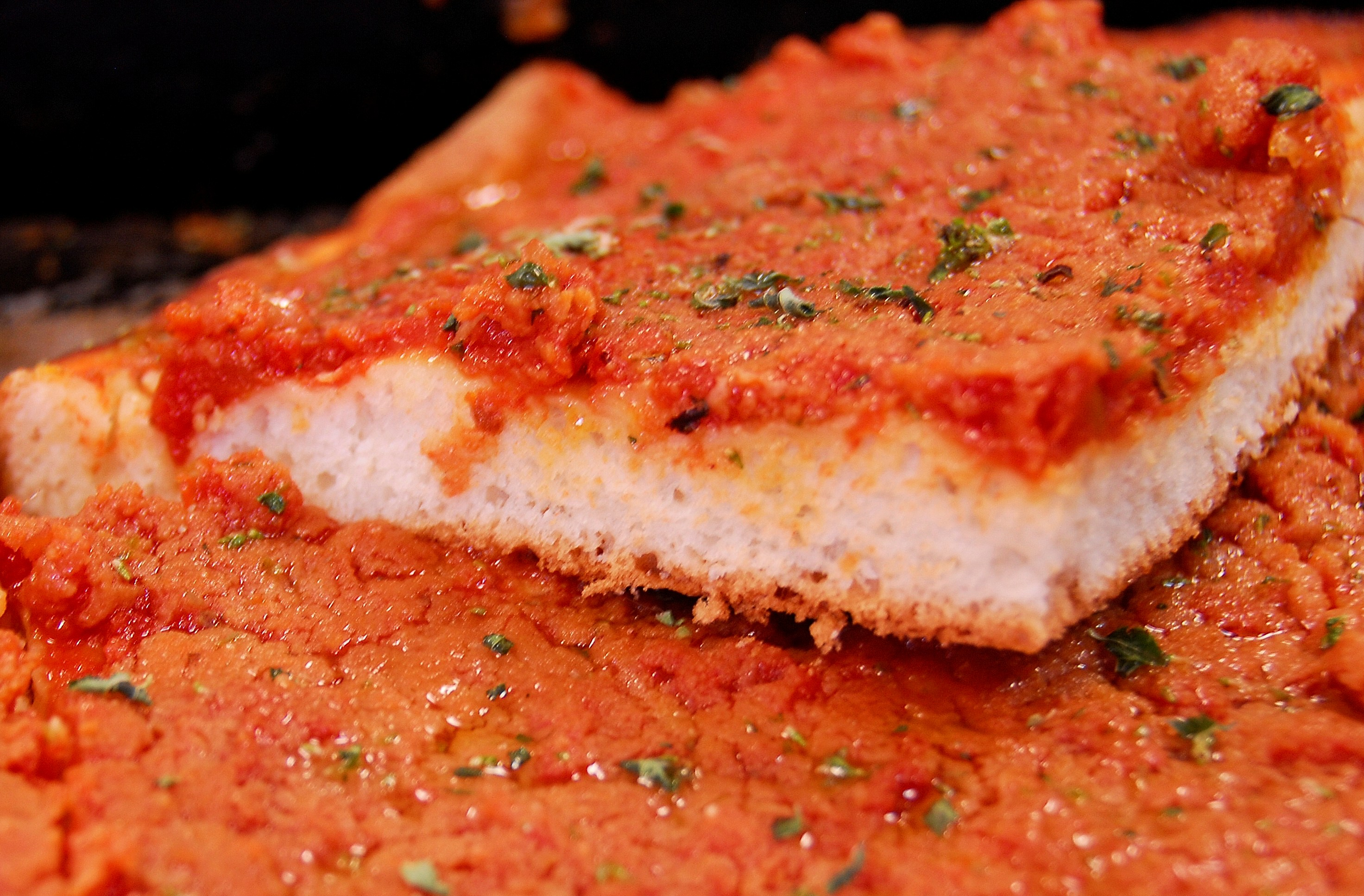
- A typical slice of Palermitan sfincione
- Alternative names: Pizza siciliana (in Italian)
- Type: Pizza
- Place of origin: Italy
- Region or state: Sicily

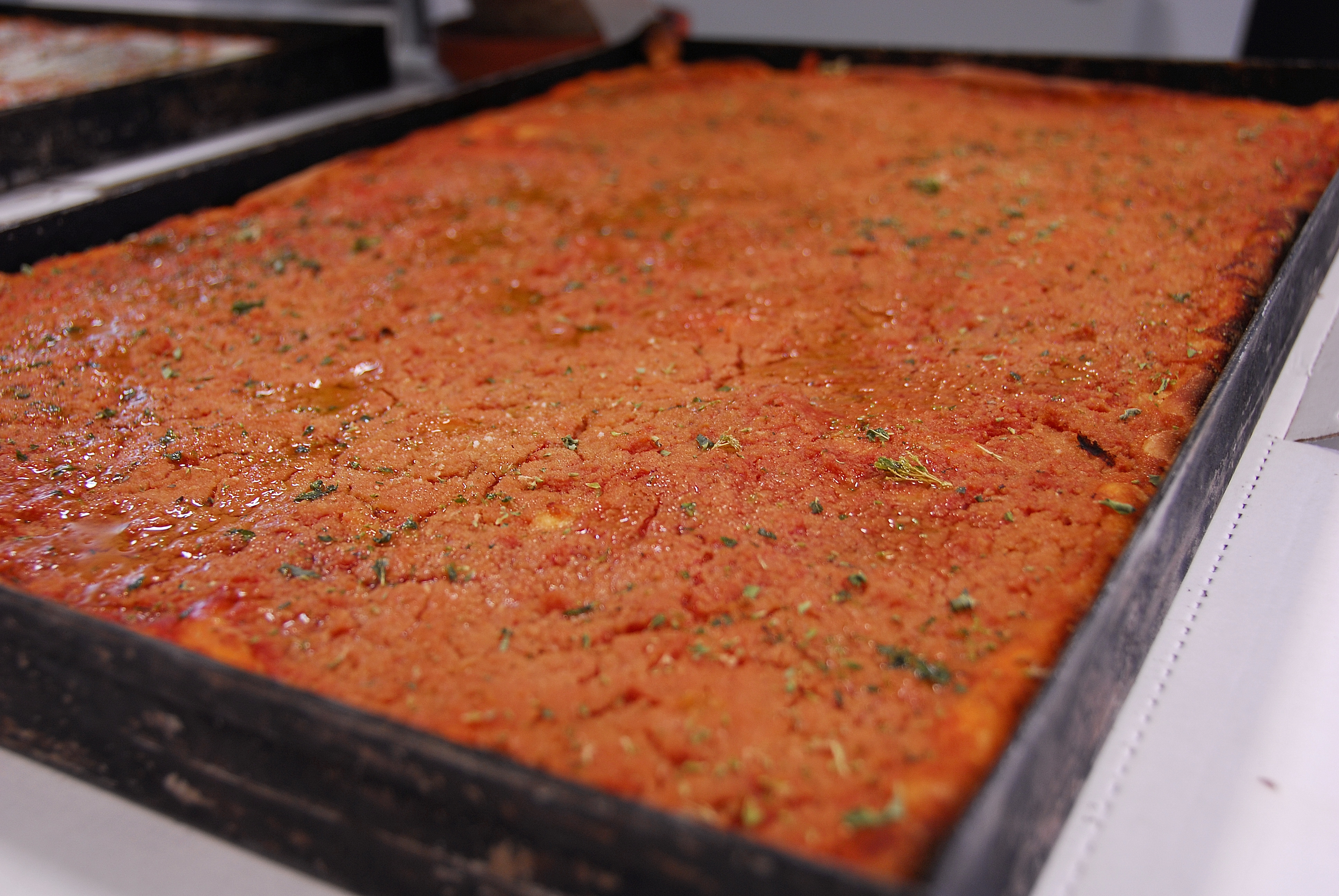
Typical Palermitan sfincione

Pizza originating in the Sicily region of Italy (Italian: pizza siciliana) became a popular dish in western Sicily by the mid-19th century and was the type of pizza usually consumed in Sicily until the 1860s. It eventually reached North America in an altered form, with thicker crust and a rectangular shape.

Traditional Sicilian pizza is often thick-crusted and rectangular, but can also be round and similar to the Neapolitan pizza. It is often topped with tomatoes, herbs, onions, anchovies, and strong cheese such as caciocavallo and toma. Other versions do not include cheese.

The Sicilian methods of making pizza are linked to local culture and country traditions, so there are differences in preparing pizza among the various provinces of the island.

== Varieties ==
=== Palermo ===
Sfincione (or sfinciuni in Sicilian language) is a very common variety of pizza that originated in the province of Palermo. Unlike Neapolitan pizza, it is typically rectangular, with more dough, sauce, and less cheese. An authentic recipe often calls for herbs, onion, tomato sauce, strong cheese, and anchovies. The sauce is sometimes placed on top of the toppings to prevent it from soaking into the thick dough.

=== Syracuse ===
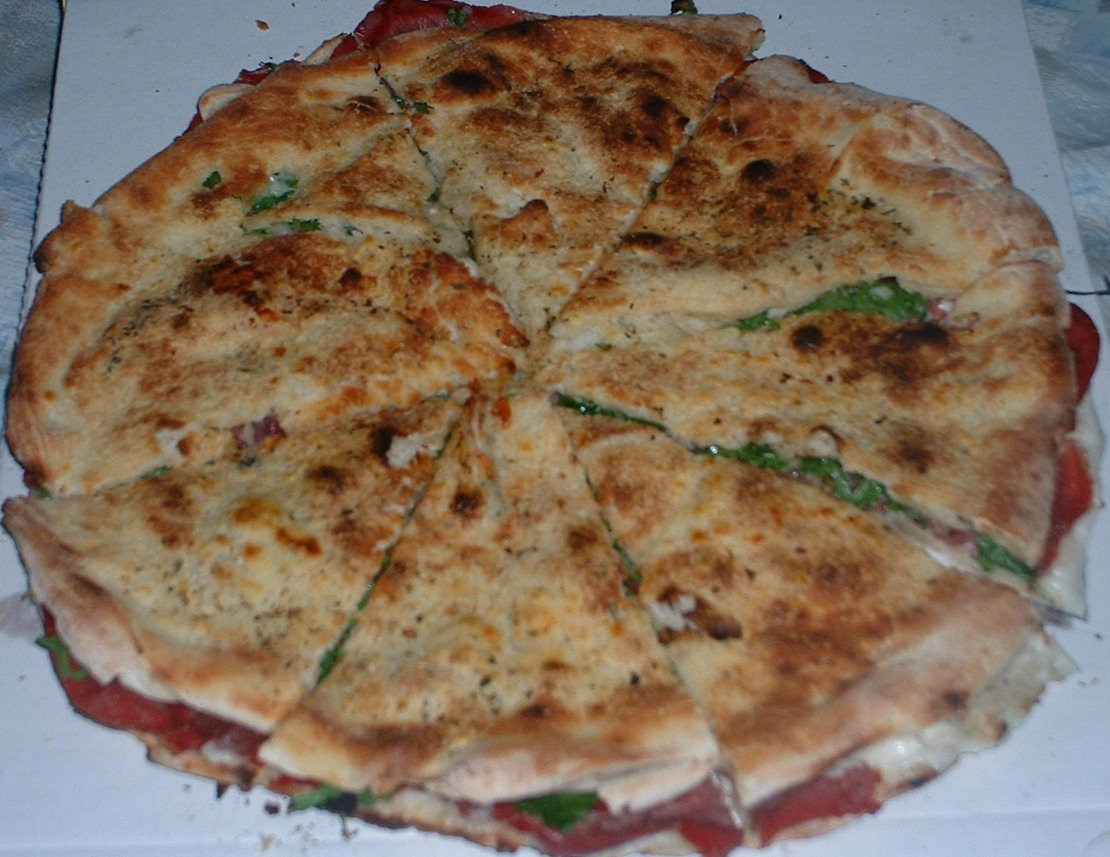
Pizzòlu from the province of Syracuse

In the province of Syracuse, especially in Solarino and Sortino, pizzòlu is a type of round stuffed pizza.

=== Catania ===
In the Metropolitan City of Catania, the traditional scacciata is made in two different ways: a first layer made of dough covered, within the city, by a local cheese (toma) and anchovies or, in the region around Catania, by potatoes, sausages, broccoli, and tomato sauce. In both cases a second layer of dough brushed with eggs covers everything. Also in the region of Catania, in Zafferana Etnea and in Viagrande a typical Sicilian pizza is a fried calzone stuffed with cheese and anchovies.

=== Messina ===
In the province of Messina, the traditional piduni is a type of calzone stuffed with endive, tomato cheese, tomato, and anchovies. There is also the focaccia alla messinese, prepared with tomato sauce, tomato cheese, vegetables, and anchovies.

== Outside Italy ==
In the United States, "Sicilian pizza" is used to describe a typically square variety of cheese pizza with dough over an inch thick, a crunchy base, and an airy interior. It is derived from the sfincione and was introduced in the United States by the first Italian (Sicilian) immigrants. Sicilian-style pizza is popular in Italian-American enclaves throughout the northeastern United States, including Massachusetts, Rhode Island, Connecticut, New York, New Jersey, Pennsylvania, and Michigan (which would influence Detroit-style pizza). In some parts of coastal Massachusetts and New Hampshire, it is also known as "beach pizza" because of its prevalence along the Route 1A corridor.

== See also ==
Media related to Sicilian pizza at Wikimedia Commons

- Sicilian cuisine
- Neapolitan pizza
- Roman pizza
- List of pizza varieties by country
