= Roman pizza =

Style of pizza

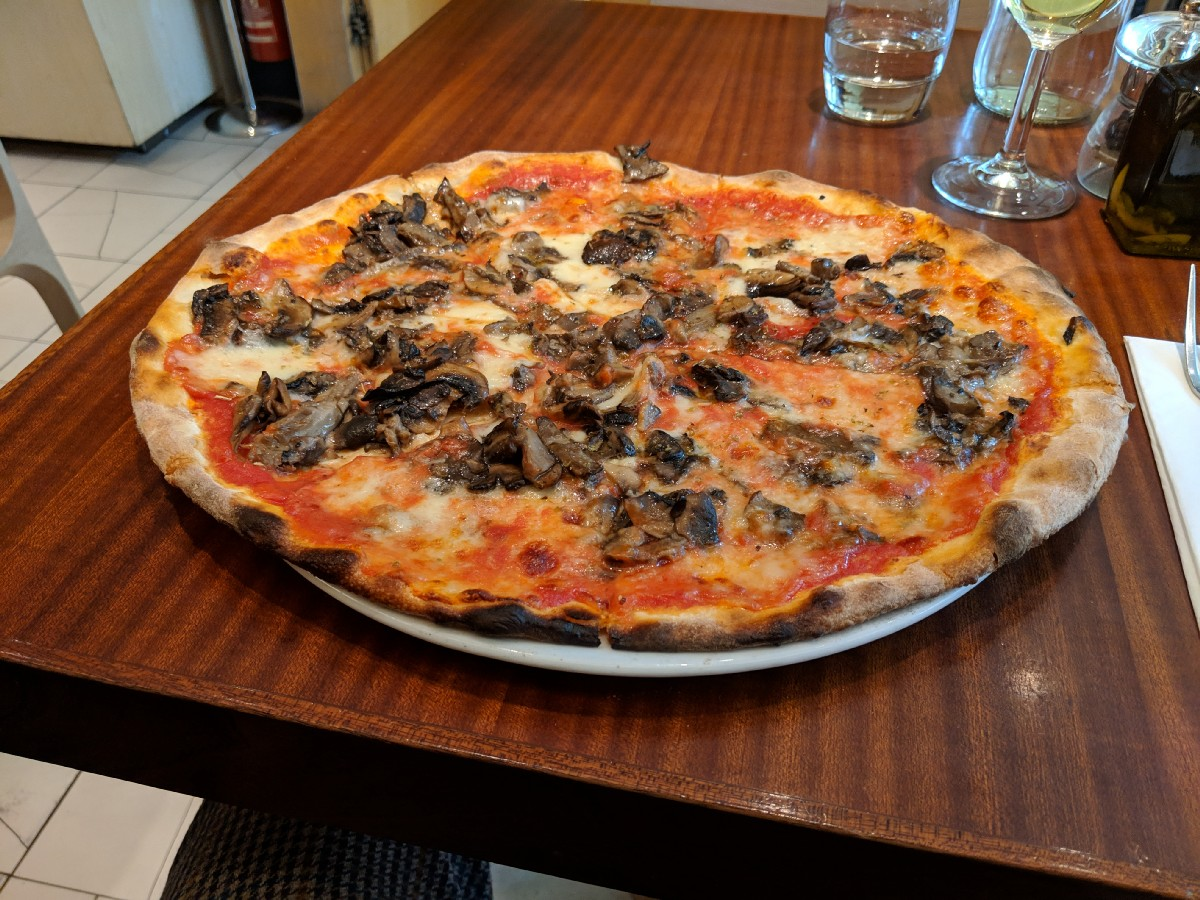
A Roman style pizza with a thin, crispy crust

Roman pizza (Italian: pizza romana) is a style of pizza originating in Rome, but now widespread, especially in central Italy.

Unlike Neapolitan pizza, which is recognised under the European Union's traditional speciality guaranteed (TSG) scheme and by UNESCO as an intangible cultural heritage, there is currently no equivalent recognition for Roman style pizza, and correspondingly no officially agreed upon definition.

There are two quite different styles of pizza which may be referred to as Roman pizza in Italy:

- Pizza al taglio (pizza by the slice). This typically comes in rectangular slices, and usually has a thicker base, similar to focaccia. It is eaten as a casual, takeaway dish.
- Whole round pizzas (pizza tonda) with a thin base. Most sit-down restaurants serving pizza in Rome serve this style, and indeed this is probably the most commonly found style of pizza in restaurants in most regions of Italy. Sometimes referred to as pizza bassa ('short pizza') to distinguish from pizza alta ('tall pizza' – the Neapolitan style). One of the key differences in the ingredients for the dough compared to the Neapolitan style is in the addition of oil, which contributes to the crispness of the resulting base, described using the word scrocchiarella, an onomatopoeic adjective in the Romanesco dialect.

However, the naming of the latter style of pizza does not appear to be consistent across Italy, and in some parts of the country this may only be referred to as pizza bassa.

== See also ==
Media related to Pizza bassa at Wikimedia Commons

- Roman cuisine
- Neapolitan pizza
- Sicilian pizza
- List of pizza varieties by country
