= Pizza oven =

Specialty oven for making pizzas

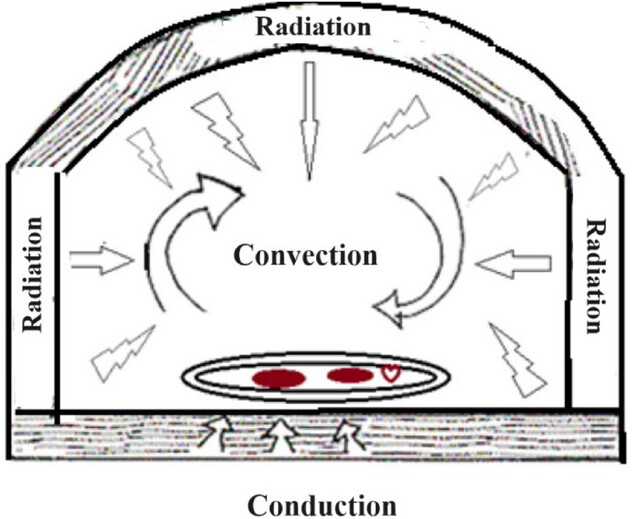
Diagram of a pizza oven.

A pizza oven is an oven that is specially suited for making pizzas, especially Neapolitan pizza. They can be wood-fired, such as a masonry oven, gas-fired, or electric.

== History ==
Primitive cultures across the world cooked food on a bakestone or the floor of the hearth itself. Vertical ovens are of Semitic origin and they have been found across the Middle East, Central Asia, northern India, and North Africa and along the Mediterranean coasts.

Acunto Forni, an award winning manufacturer based in Naples, was founded in 1892 by Vincenzo Acunto.

G.S. Blodgett Company in the U.S. offered a gas-fired oven designed by Frank Mastro "The Pizza King".

In 1949, Ira Nevin, an oven repairman who had been stationed in Naples during WWII, received a U.S. patent for the design of a ceramic-lined gas-powered oven specifically for pizzas and founded a company called Baker's Pride.

Faulds Oven & Equipment Co. developed a rotating shelf oven system used in some Chicago area pizzerias.

== Types ==
- Wood-fired ovens are generally built on a base of tuff and fire brick covered by a circular cooking floor above which a dome is built to minimize heat dispersion.
- Gas-fired
- Electric pizza ovens have a smaller carbon footprint than wood-fired pizza ovens.
- Hybrid pizza ovens are ovens that can use both wood and gas as a fuel.
- Coal-fired

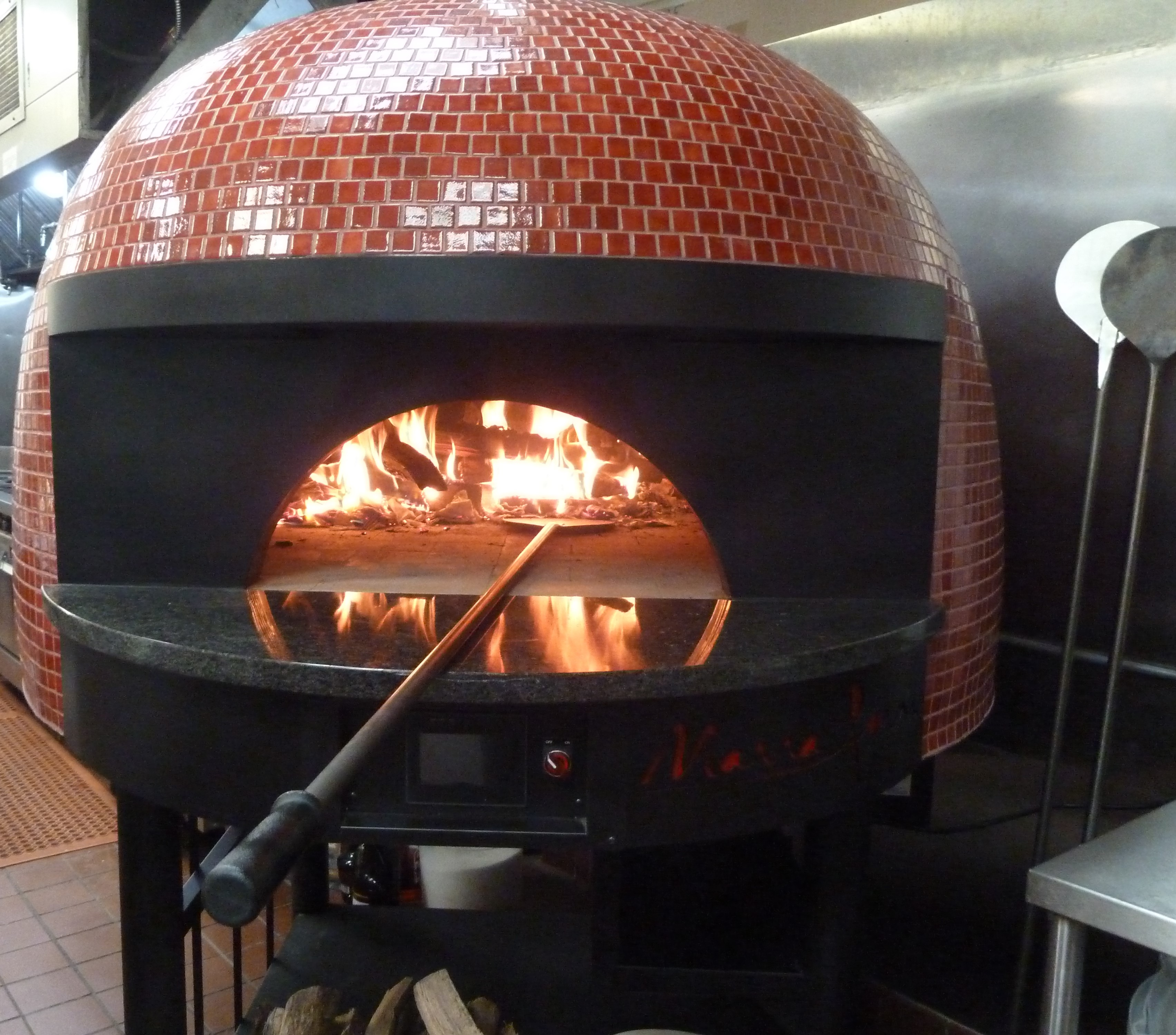
Wood-fired Pizza Oven

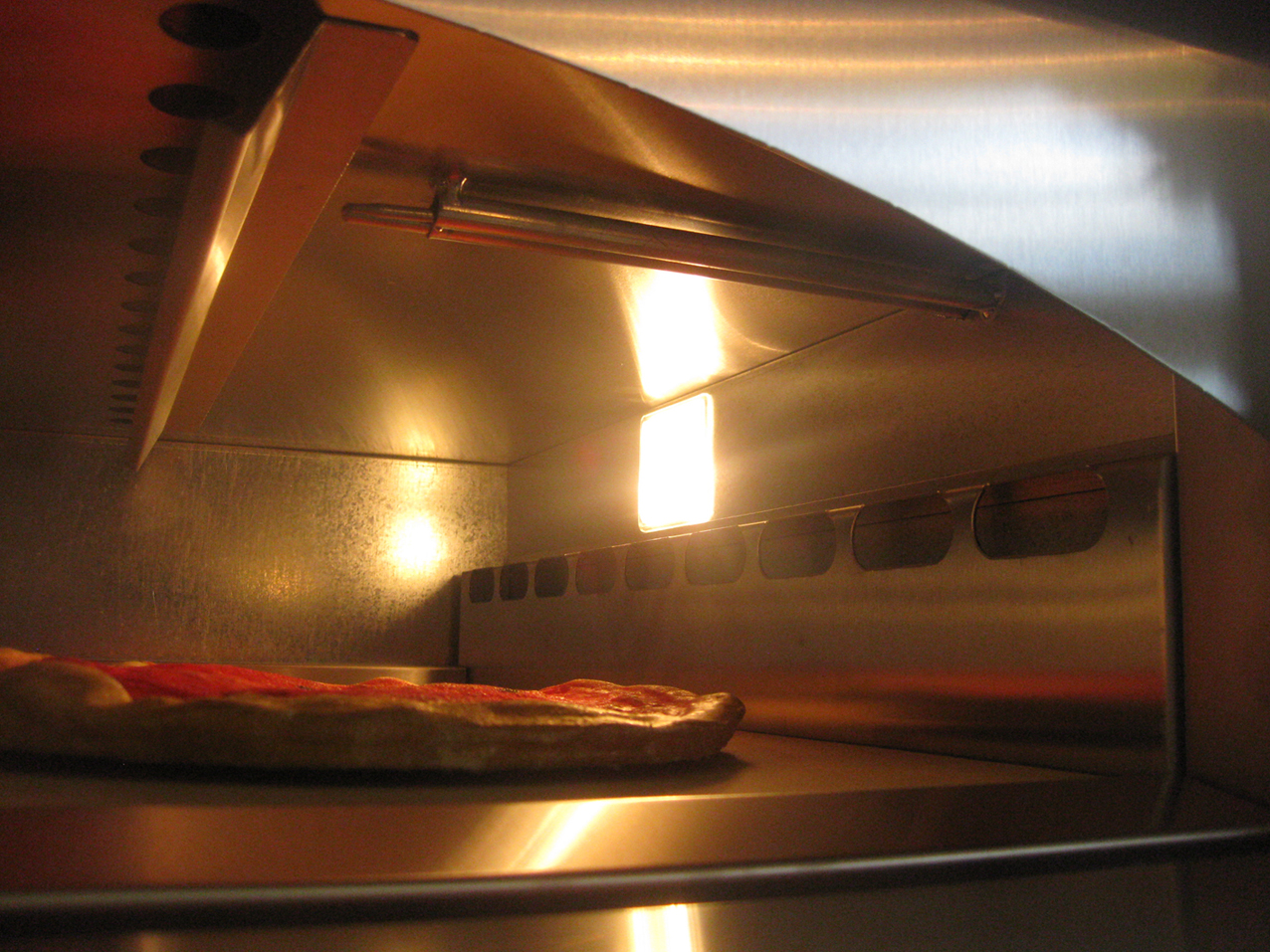
Gas-fired Pizza Oven

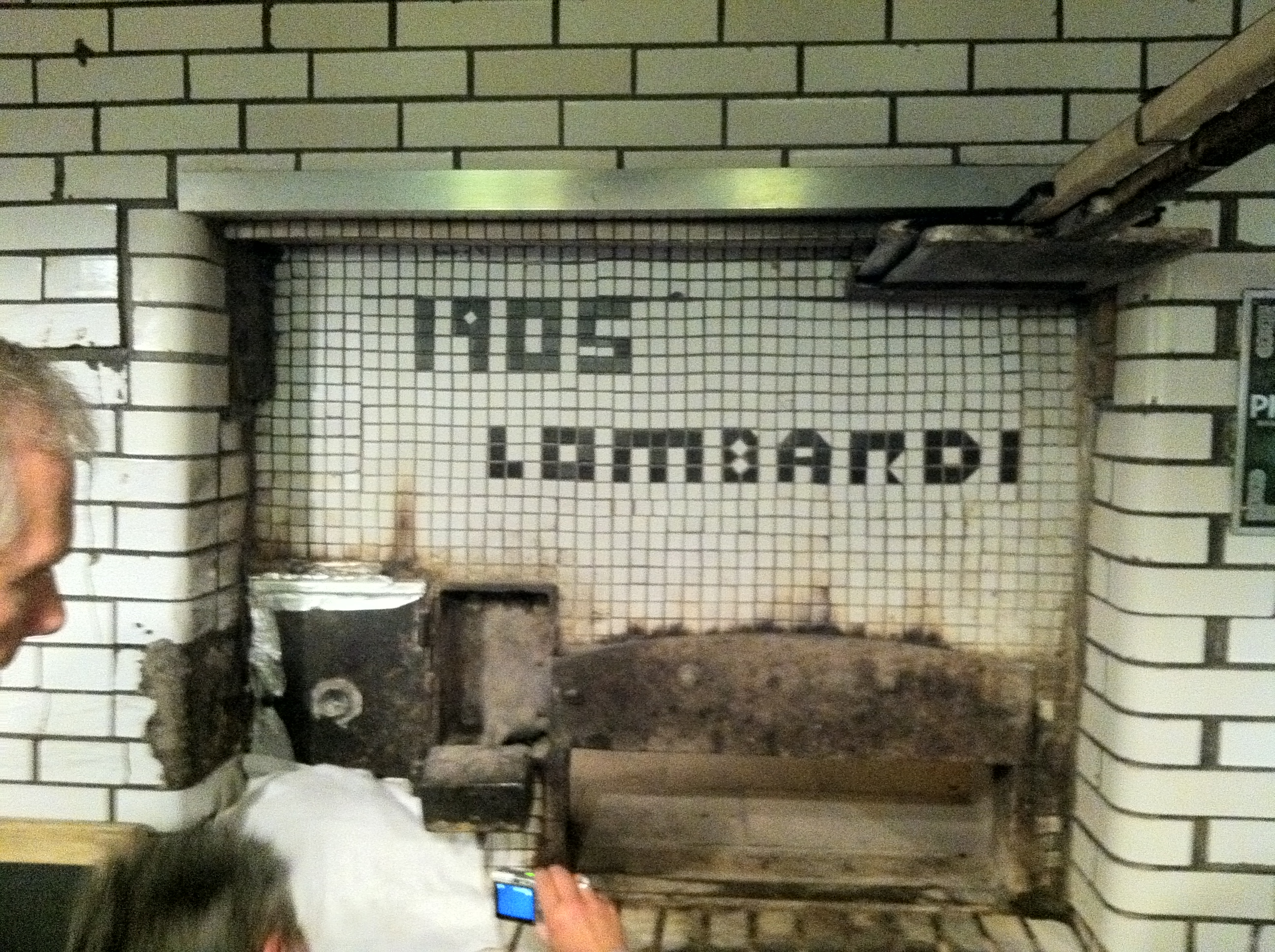
Coal-fired Pizza Oven

== Working principle ==
The high temperatures achieved in a pizza oven create conditions where a Maillard reaction can occur, the moisture from the pizza ingredients evaporates and the steam is trapped in the oven. The operation of wood-fired pizza ovens is dependent on the operator's ability.

== Health and environmental impacts ==
Pizza ovens have not received much coverage as a source of urban pollution. A 2018 study found that although wood-fired ovens gave rise to high particle emissions, the concentrations of fine particles they measured were low.

== Neapolitan pizza ==
According to EU regulation No. 97/2010 from 4 February 2010, Neapolitan Pizzas can only be made in wood-fired brick ovens. However, Associazione Verace Pizza Napoletana certified gas or electric ovens are permitted when wood-fired ovens are impractical, due to environmental and health concerns. Ten models of electric pizza oven have been certified, including the Scugnizzonapoletano of Giuseppe Krauss.
