= Pizza Margherita =

Neapolitan style pizza

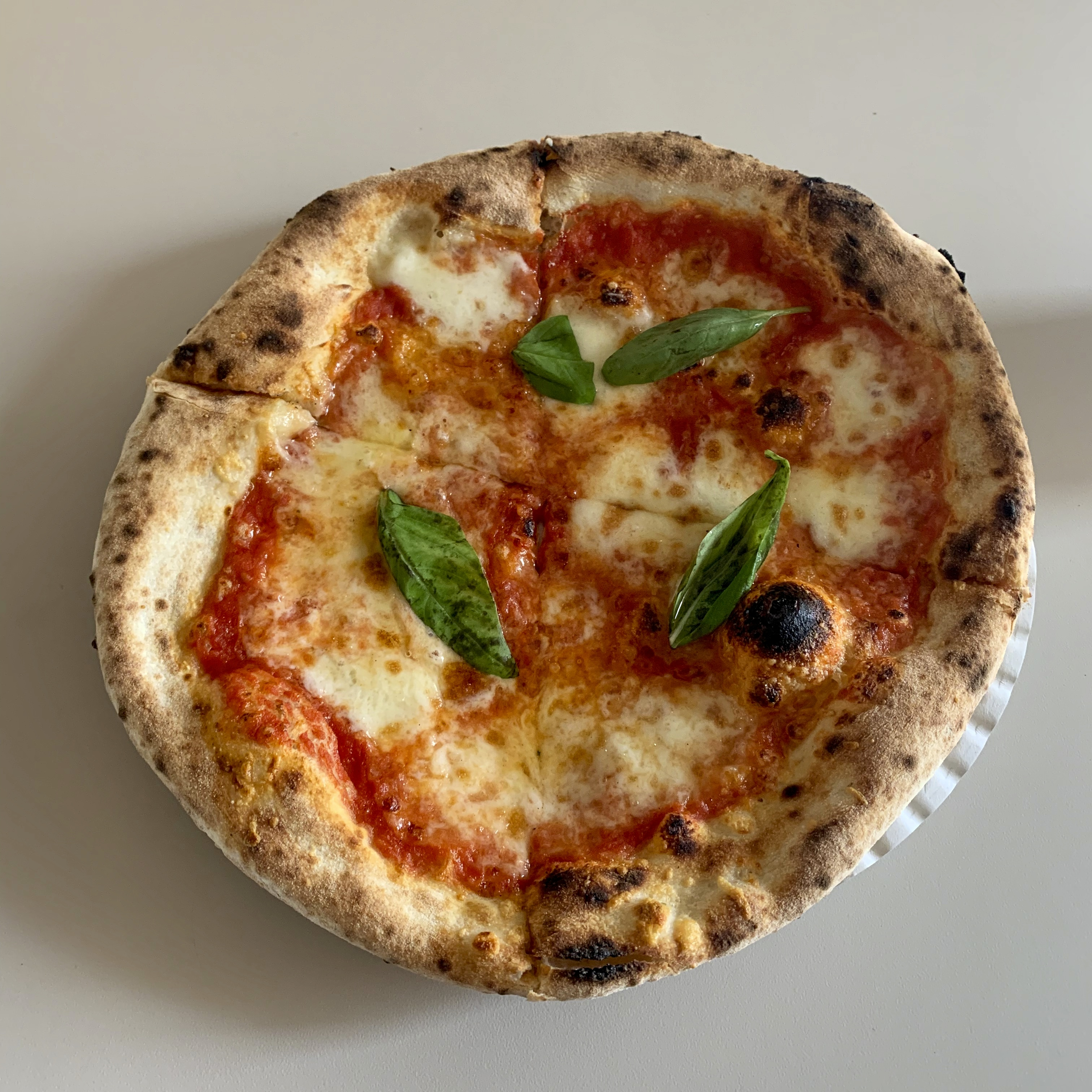
- Alternative names: Margherita pizza
- Type: Pizza
- Place of origin: Naples
- Region or state: Italy
- Main ingredients: Tomatoes, mozzarella, basil leaves, extra virgin olive oil

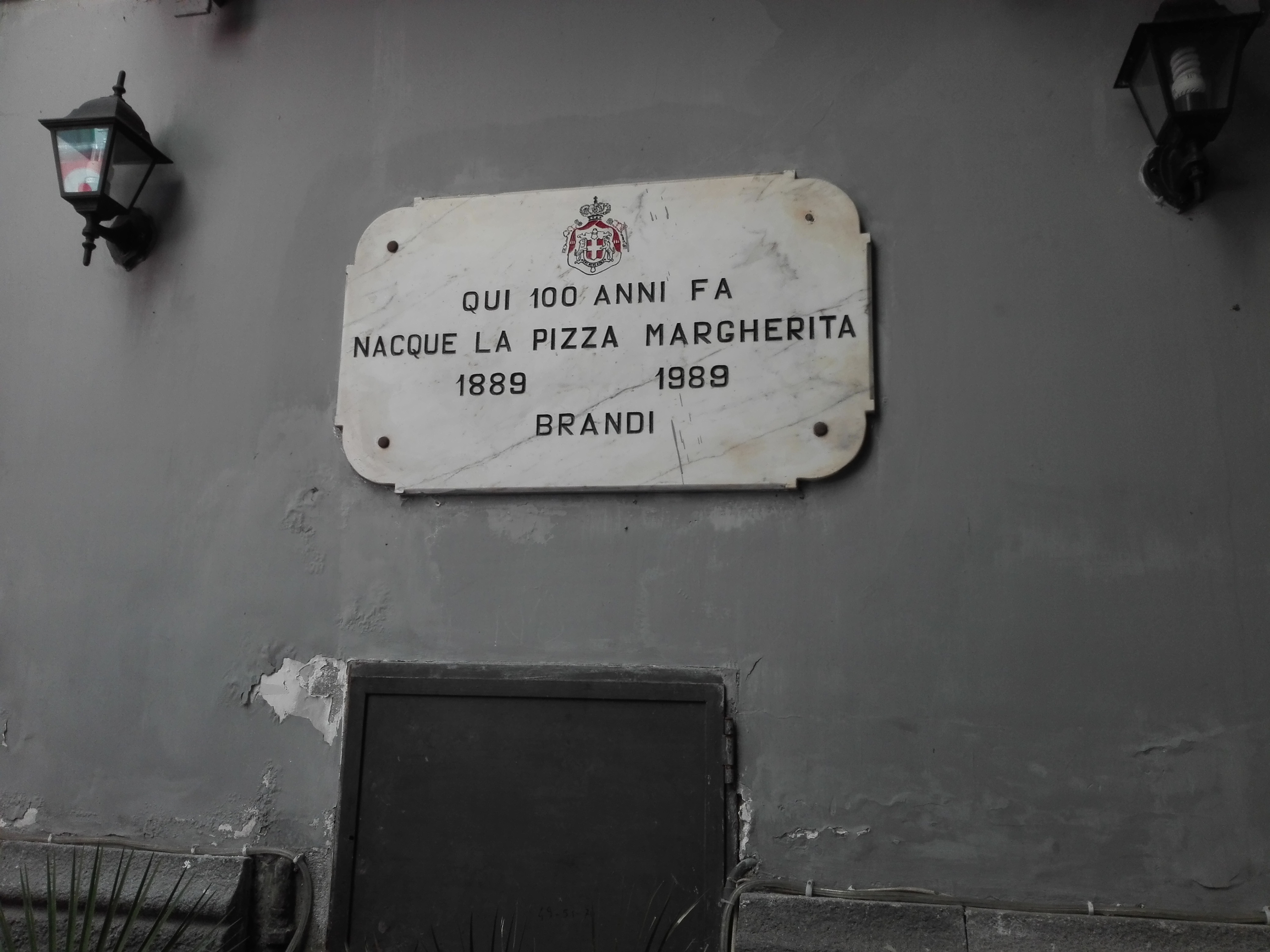
1989 commemorative plaque in Naples, Italy, marking the 100th anniversary celebration of the creation of pizza Margherita

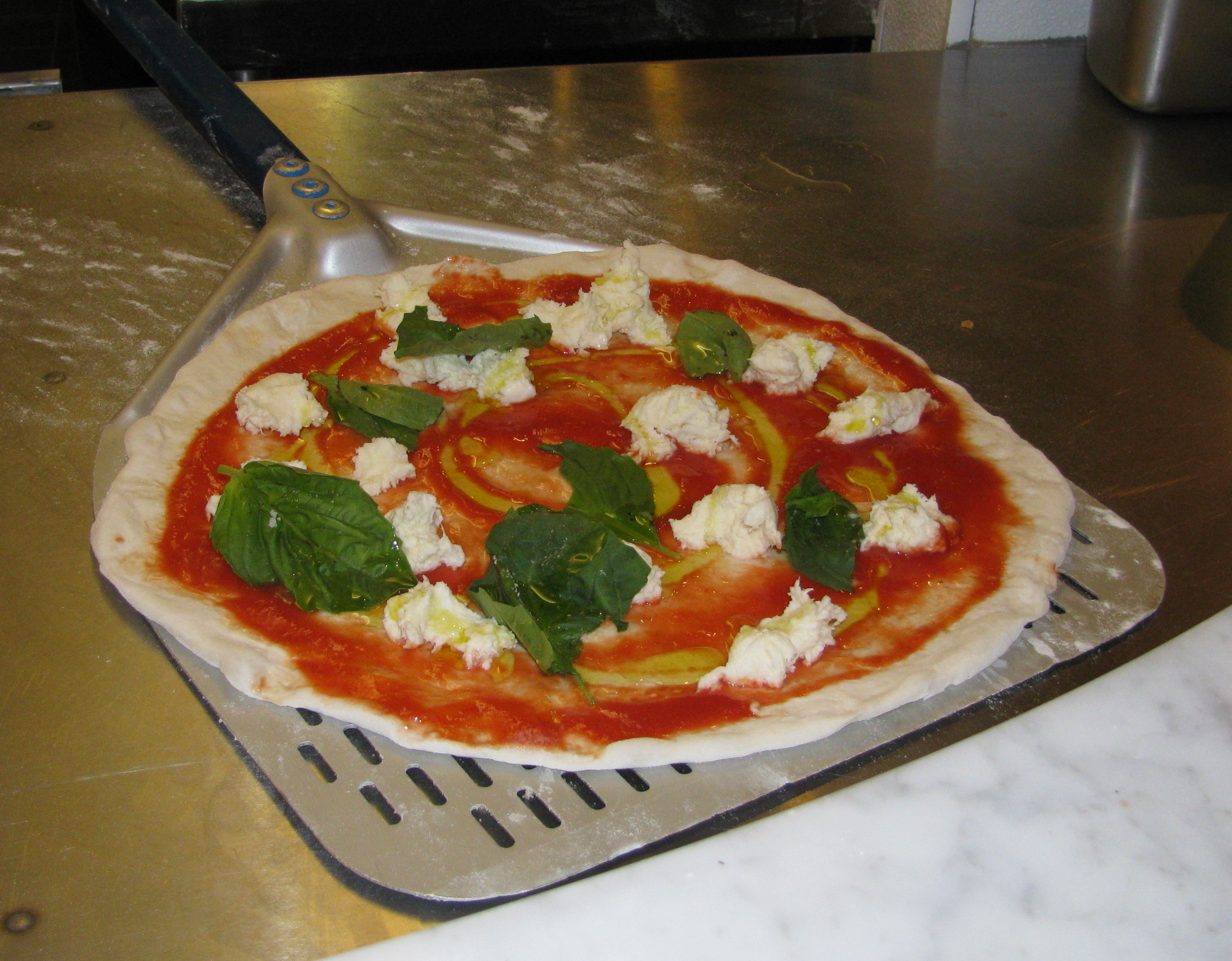
Uncooked pizza Margherita on a pizza peel

Pizza Margherita, also known as Margherita pizza, is, together with the pizza marinara, the typical Neapolitan pizza. It is roundish in shape with a raised edge (the cornicione) and seasoned with hand-crushed peeled tomatoes, mozzarella (buffalo mozzarella or fior di latte), fresh basil leaves, and extra virgin olive oil. The dough is made by mixing water, salt, and yeast (either sourdough, or fresh or dry baker's yeast) with flour (00 or 0).

The dough is stretched by the pizzaiolo ('pizza maker') in a motion going outwards from the center, pressing with the fingers of both hands on the dough ball, and flipping it several times, shaping it into a disc. It is then topped and baked in an oven, which is traditionally made of brick and wood-fired (electric or gas ovens are also used). Pizza Margherita is usually served hot on a plate or folded into four and wrapped in paper (pizza a portafoglio or a libretto).

== History ==
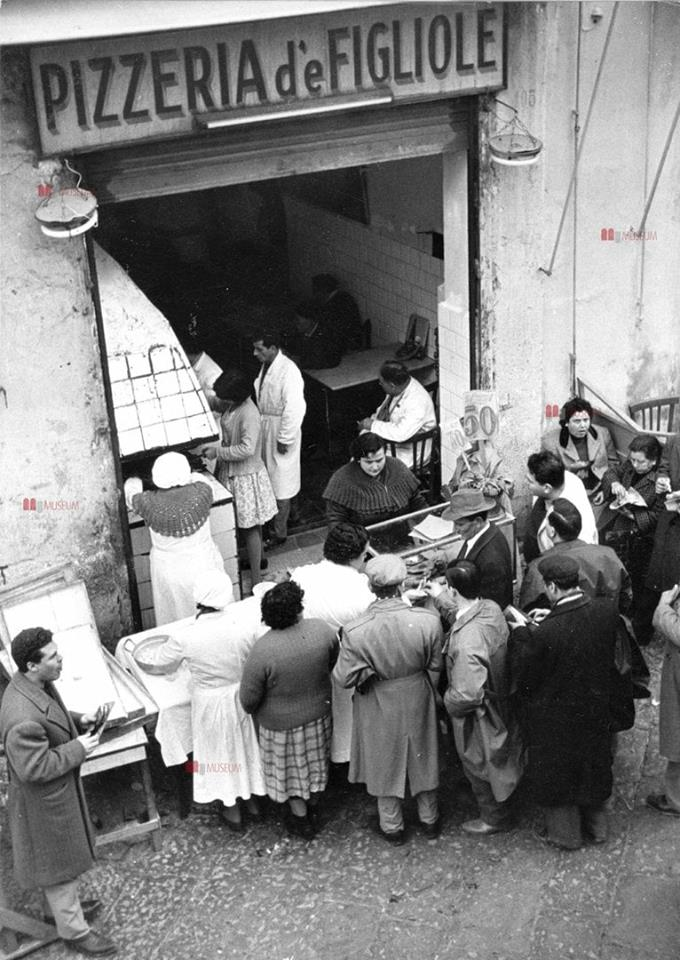
Pizzeria de' Figliole, Naples, Italy, c. 1950s–1960s

The origins of pizza Margherita came from mixing similar toppings that were already present in Naples between 1796 and 1810. In 1849 Emanuele Rocco recorded different pizza toppings including basil, tomatoes, and thin slices of mozzarella; the mozzarella was thinly sliced, and added to the toppings already present.

In 1866, Francesco De Bourcard, writing about the traditions of Naples, described the most commonly used pizza toppings at that time as well as the possible origin of calzone:

The most ordinary pizza, called coll'aglio e l'olio (lit. 'with garlic and oil'), is dressed with oil, and over it is spread, as well as salt, origanum]l, and garlic cloves shredded minutely (optionally). Others can be covered in grated cheese and dressed with lard, and then they put on a few leaves of basil. Over the former is often added (depending on the region) some small seafish; on the latter some thin slices of mozzarella. Sometimes they use slices of prosciutto, tomato, arselle, etc. Sometimes folding the dough over itself to form what is called calzone.

A popular legend holds that the archetypal pizza Margherita was invented on 10 June 1889, when the Royal Palace of Capodimonte commissioned the Neapolitan pizzaiolo Raffaele Esposito to create a pizza in honor of the visiting Queen Margherita. Of the three different pizzas he created, the queen strongly preferred a pizza swathed in the colours of the national flag of Italy—red (tomato), white (mozzarella), and green (basil). Supposedly, this type of pizza was then named after the queen, with an official letter of recognition from the queen's "head of service" remaining to this day on display in Esposito's shop, now called Pizzeria Brandi.

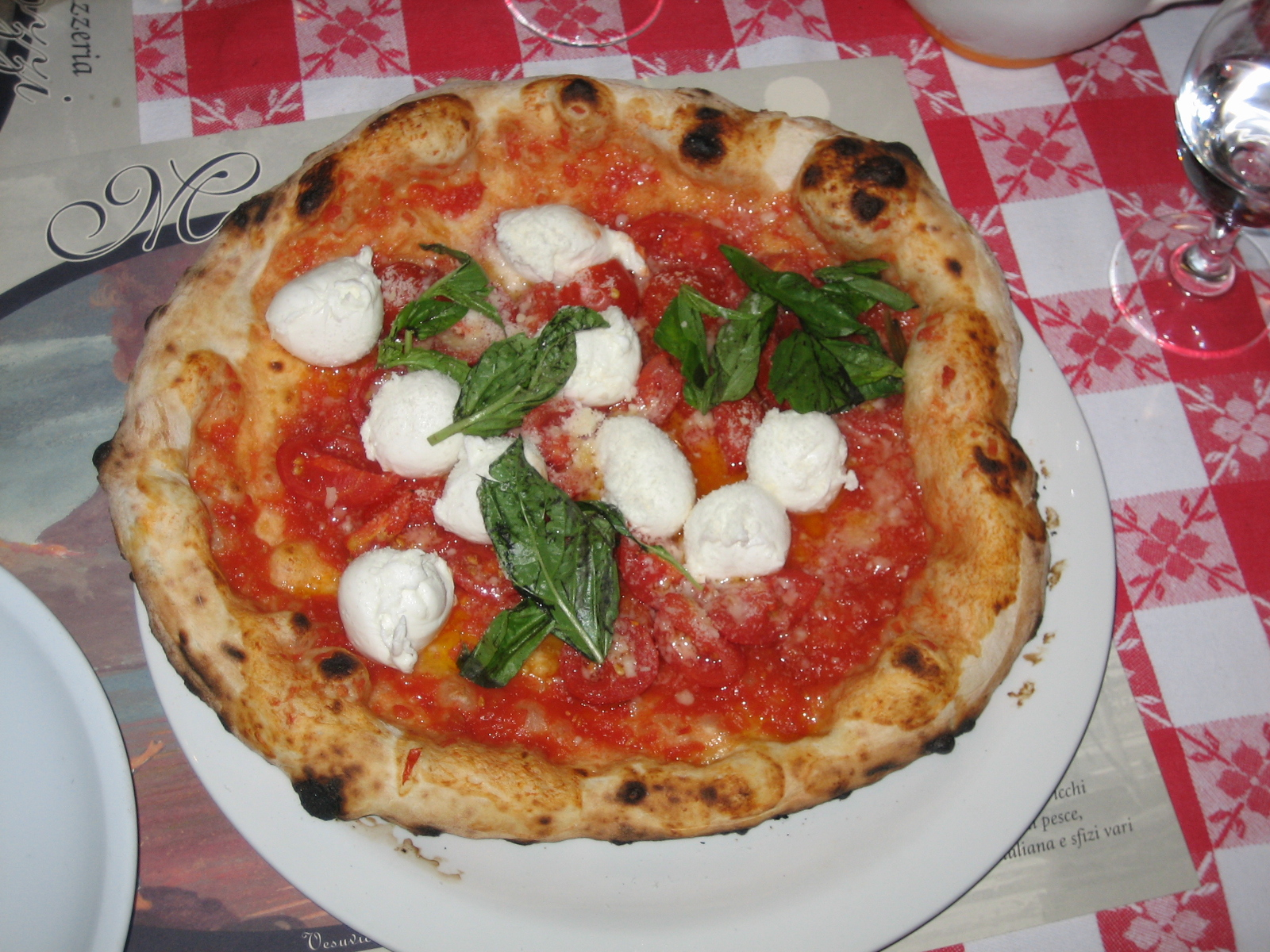
The ingredients of traditional pizza Margherita—tomatoes (red), mozzarella (white), and basil (green)—are held by popular legend to be inspired by the colours of the national flag of Italy.

Later research cast doubt on this legend, undermining the authenticity of the letter of recognition, pointing out that no media of the period reported the supposed visit and that both the story and name Margherita were first promoted in the 1930s–1940s.

== Gallery ==
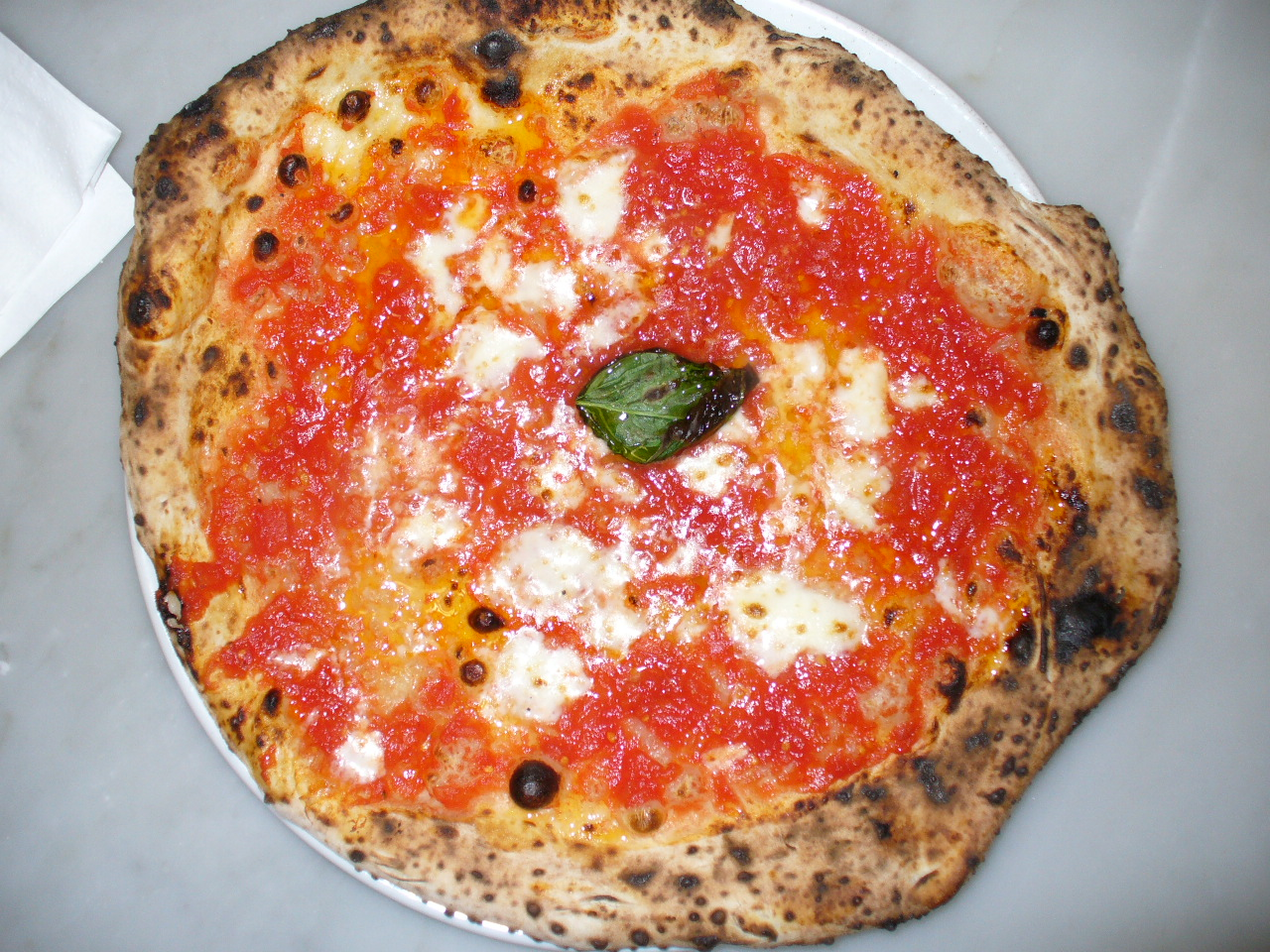

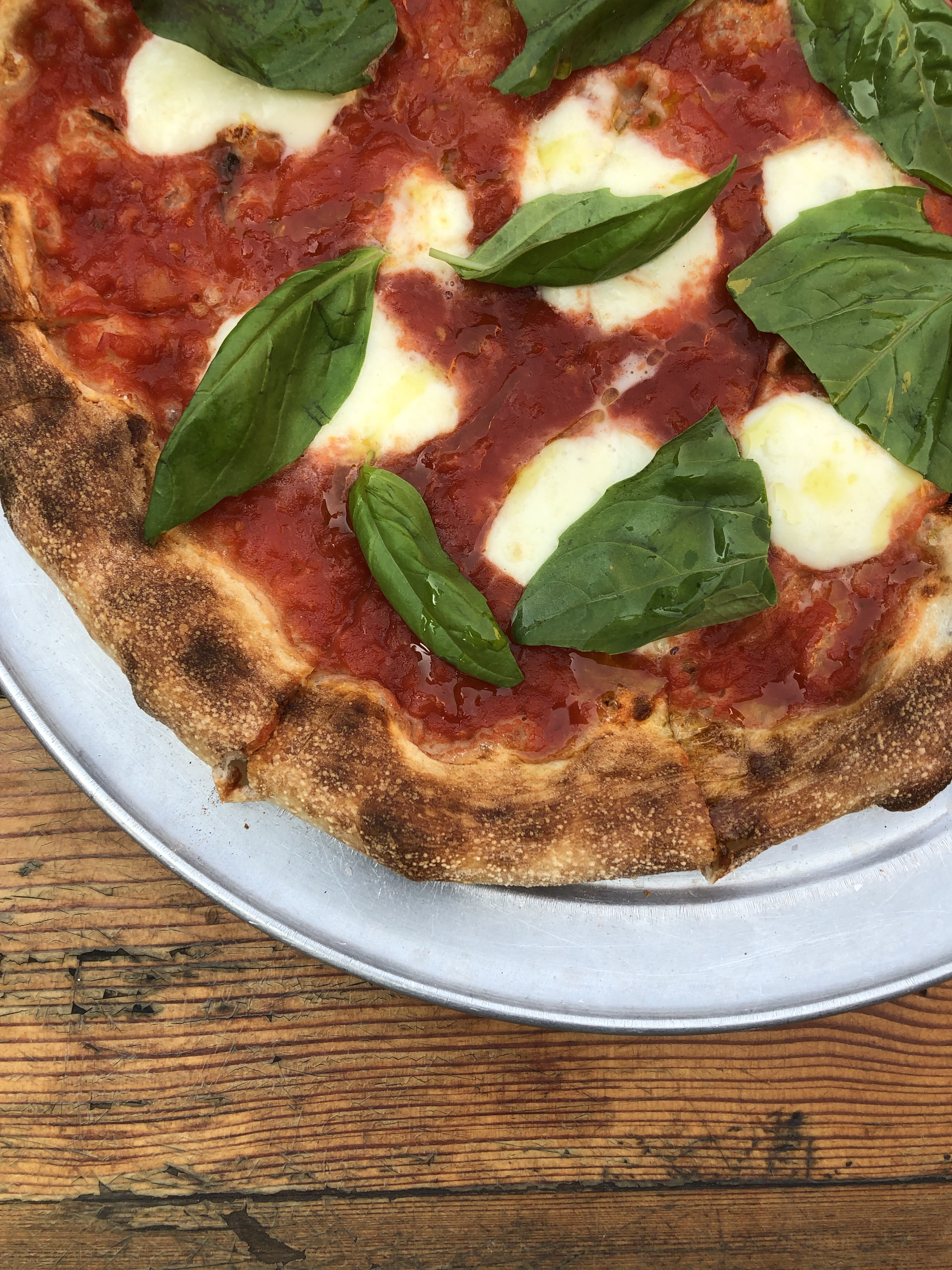

== See also ==
Media related to Pizza Margherita at Wikimedia Commons

- Neapolitan cuisine
- Neapolitan pizza
- Pizza marinara
- List of pizza varieties by country

== Bibliography ==
- De Bourcard, Francesco (1866). Usi e costumi di Napoli e contorni descritti e dipinti (in Italian).
