= Raffaele Esposito =

Italian chef

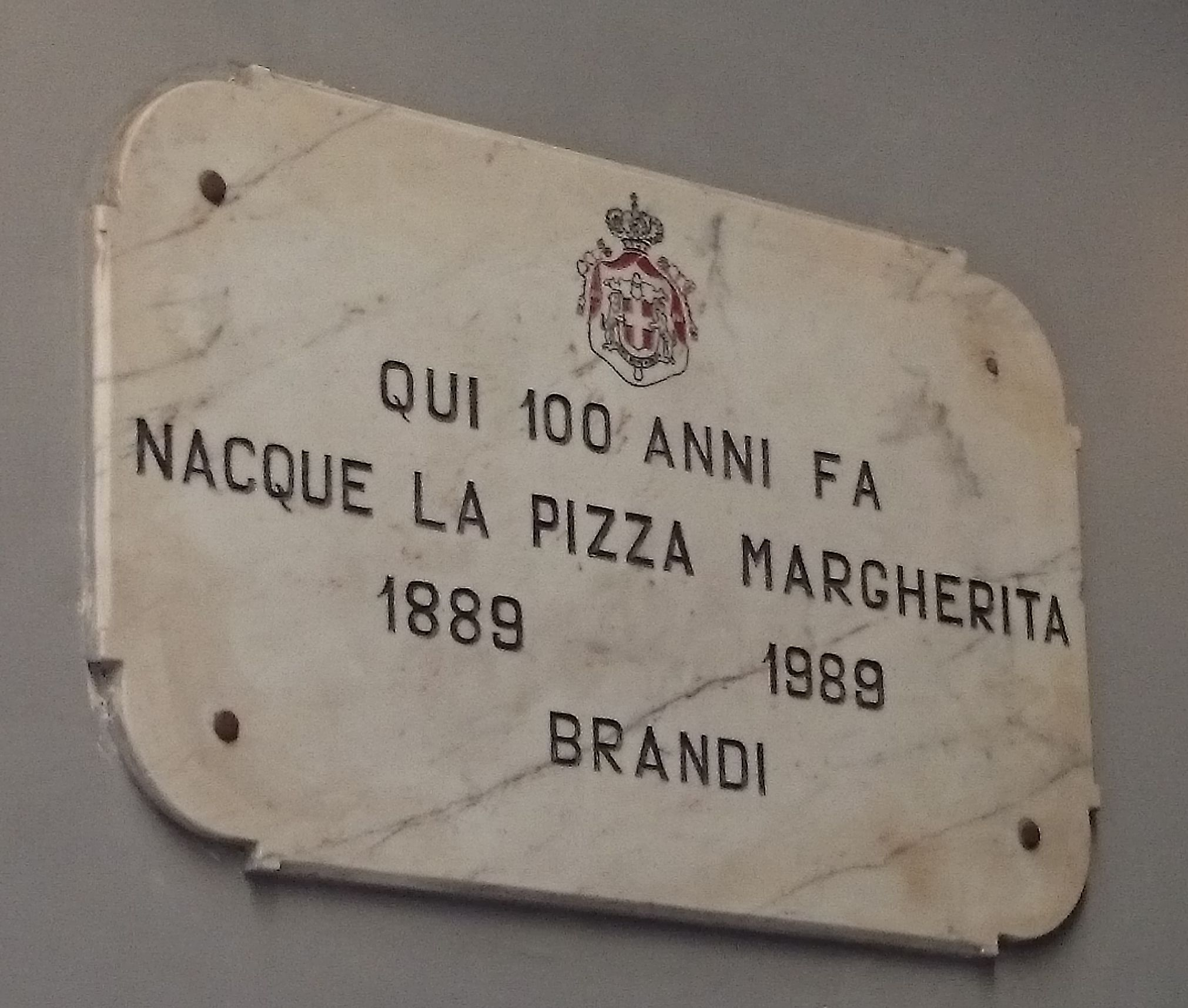
Plaque in Naples remembering the centennial of pizza Margherita invention

Raffaele Esposito (Italian: [raffaˈɛːle eˈspɔːzito]) was an Italian chef and owner of a tavern in Naples called Pizzeria di Pietro e basta così (lit. 'Pietro's Pizzeria and that's enough') in the 19th century that had been founded in 1780 by Pietro Colicchio. Esposito is often credited for popularizing modern day pizza.

In 1889, pizza had not yet become a popular or well-known dish and was typically eaten by poor people as a way to utilize various ingredients that would otherwise be wasted. At that time, Esposito was considered the premier pizzaiolo (lit. 'pizza maker') in the city of Naples.

According to a popular (but questioned) legend, Esposito was requested to prepare a pizza for Queen Margherita of Savoy, who had traveled to Naples with King Umberto I. Esposito and his wife were admitted to the royal kitchens to prepare this dish as he saw fit. Deeming the traditional garlic topping to be unfit for the royal palate, Esposito instead prepared three different pizzas, the last of which used a combination of tomatoes, mozzarella cheese and basil to emulate the red, white, and green of the Italian flag. It is claimed by some sources that this was the first time pizza was made with mozzarella cheese.

Queen Margherita, having never had pizza before, enjoyed the dish so much that she had her head of table services send Esposito a letter to commend his pizzas, stating that they "were found to be delicious". Esposito used this recommendation to successfully promote his restaurant, naming the pizza most enjoyed by the Queen, pizza Margherita. The legend of pizza Margherita is considered a false history, as a pizza made with the same toppings was already present in Naples between 1796 and 1810.

It is widely reported that this event caused pizza to become a fad, from which it retained enduring popularity. Because of Esposito's experiments with ingredients and presentation, and his successful preparation of the dish for Queen Margherita, it is suggested by some that Esposito was the father of the modern pizza.

Esposito's restaurant still exists on the spot where it was founded by Pietro Colicchio, at Salita Sant'Ana di Palazzo 1/2, although its current name is Pizzeria Brandi. The royal letter favouring Esposito's pizza is on display in the restaurant. Later research cast doubt on this legend, undermining the authenticity of the royal letter of recognition, pointing out that no media of the period reported about a supposed visit and that both the story and the name Margherita were first promoted in the 1930s–1940s.
