= Antica Pizzeria Port'Alba =

Coordinates: 40°50′57.82″N 14°15′6.78″E

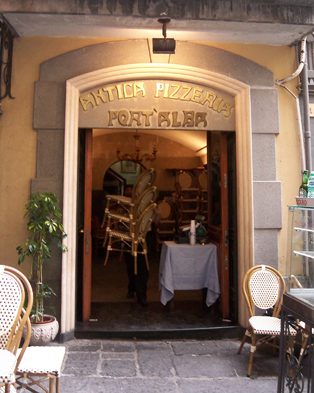
- Antica Pizzeria Port'Alba's main entrance
- Interactive map of Antica Pizzeria Port'Alba

Restaurant information
- Established: 1738
- Food type: Italian pizzeria
- Location: Via Port'Alba, Naples, 18, 80134, Italy
- Website: Pizzeria Port’Alba

Antica Pizzeria Port'Alba is a pizzeria in Naples, Italy, which is widely believed to be the world's first pizzeria.

== History ==
First established in 1738 as a stand for peddlers, Antica Pizzeria Port'Alba was opened in 1830 in the town center at Via Port'Alba 18. The restaurant replaced street vendors who would make pizza in wood-fired ovens and bring it onto the street, keeping it warm in small tin stoves they balanced on their head. It soon became a prominent meeting place for men in the street. Most patrons were artists, students, or others with very little money, so the pizzas made were generally simple, with toppings such as oil and garlic. A payment system, called pizza a otto, was developed that allowed customers to pay up to eight days after their meal. A resulting local joke was that a meal from Port'Alba might be someone's last free meal, if they died before they paid. Additionally, patrons created poetry to honor the pizzas. Antica Pizzeria Port'Alba is still in business today, located between a number of bookstores. It is widely believed to be the world's first pizzeria.

== Food ==
Since its creation in 1830, the eatery's ovens have been lined with lava rocks from nearby Mount Vesuvius. At the time of its creation, one popular pizza was the Mastunicola, topped with lard, sheep milk cheese, and basil. Basil and oregano were the most common herbs, while other toppings included seafood, buffalo mozzarella, cured meats, and cecinielli, small white fish still in development.

== See also ==
Media related to Antica Pizzeria Port'Alba at Wikimedia Commons

- List of oldest companies
- List of pizza varieties by country
