= Pizza marinara =

Neapolitan style pizza

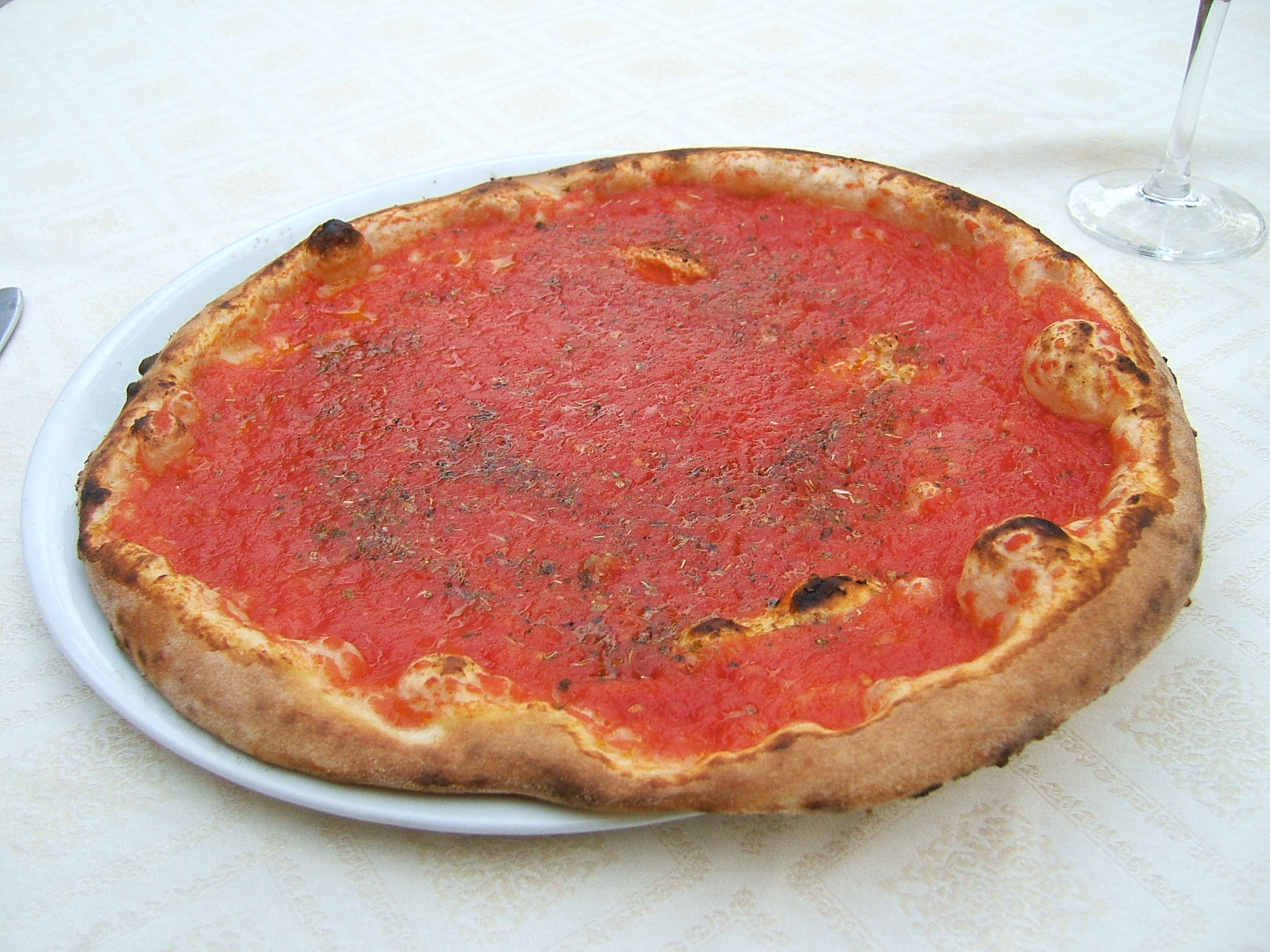
- Alternative names: Pizza alla marinara
- Type: Pizza
- Place of origin: Italy
- Region or state: Naples
- Main ingredients: Tomatoes, extra virgin olive oil, oregano, garlic

Pizza marinara, also known as pizza alla marinara (from Italian marinaro "pertaining to sailors"), is a traditional Neapolitan pizza seasoned with tomatoes, extra virgin olive oil, oregano, and garlic. It is supposedly the oldest tomato-topped pizza and, together with the pizza Margherita, it is the typical pizza of Naples.

== History ==
It has been claimed the pizza marinara was introduced around the year 1735 (in 1734 according to European Commission regulation 97/2010), and was prepared using olive oil, cherry tomatoes, basil, oregano, and garlic at that time, and that historically it was known to be ordered commonly by poor sailors, and made on their ships due to it being made from easily preservable ingredients. The historical account of the pizza marinara's creation and its association with sailors rests predominantly on oral and traditional retellings rather than documented, empirical evidence.

Francesco de Bourcard, writing in his 1866 book Usi e costumi di Napoli ('Customs and Traditions of Naples'), Vol. II (p. 124), seemed to know the recipe with a different name, and to consider the addition of tomatoes an extra for both marinara and Margherita:

Le pizze più ordinarie, dette coll'aglio e l'olio, han per condimento l'olio, e sopra vi si sparge, oltre il sale, l'origano e spicchi d'aglio trinciati minutamente. Altre sono coperte di formaggio grattugiato e condite collo strutto, e allora vi si pone disopra qualche foglia di basilico. Alle prime spesso si aggiunge del pesce minuto; alle seconde delle sottili fette di mozzarella. Talora si fa uso di prosciutto affettato, di pomidoro, di arselle, ecc. Talora ripiegando la pasta su se stessa se ne forma quel che chiamasi calzone.

[The most ordinary pizzas, called with garlic and oil, have oil as seasoning, and on top, besides salt, oregano and finely chopped garlic cloves are sprinkled. Others are covered with grated cheese and seasoned with lard, and then some basil leaves are placed on top. To the first, small fish is often added; to the second, thin slices of mozzarella. Sometimes sliced ham, tomatoes, clams, etc. are used. Sometimes by folding the dough on itself what is called calzone is formed.]

— Francesco de Bourcard, Usi e costumi di Napoli, 1866

== Recipe ==
According to the Associazione Verace Pizza Napoletana:

Using a spoon place the pressed, peeled tomatoes in to the centre of the pizza base, then using a spiralling motion, cover the entire surface of the base with the sauce excluding the crust (the addition or substitution of peeled tomatoes with fresh tomatoes is allowed).

Remove any hard or dry sections of the clove of garlic and slice finely. Scatter the slices using the same circular motion over the tomato. Scatter a pinch of oregano in an orderly manner over the surface.

Using a traditional copper oil canister or inert food storage with spiralling motion, starting from the centre and moving out, pour extra virgin olive oil over the pizza.

== See also ==
Media related to Pizza marinara at Wikimedia Commons

- Neapolitan cuisine
- Neapolitan pizza
- Pizza Margherita
- List of pizza varieties by country
- Lahmacun
