= Neapolitan pizza =

Renowned version of the round pizza

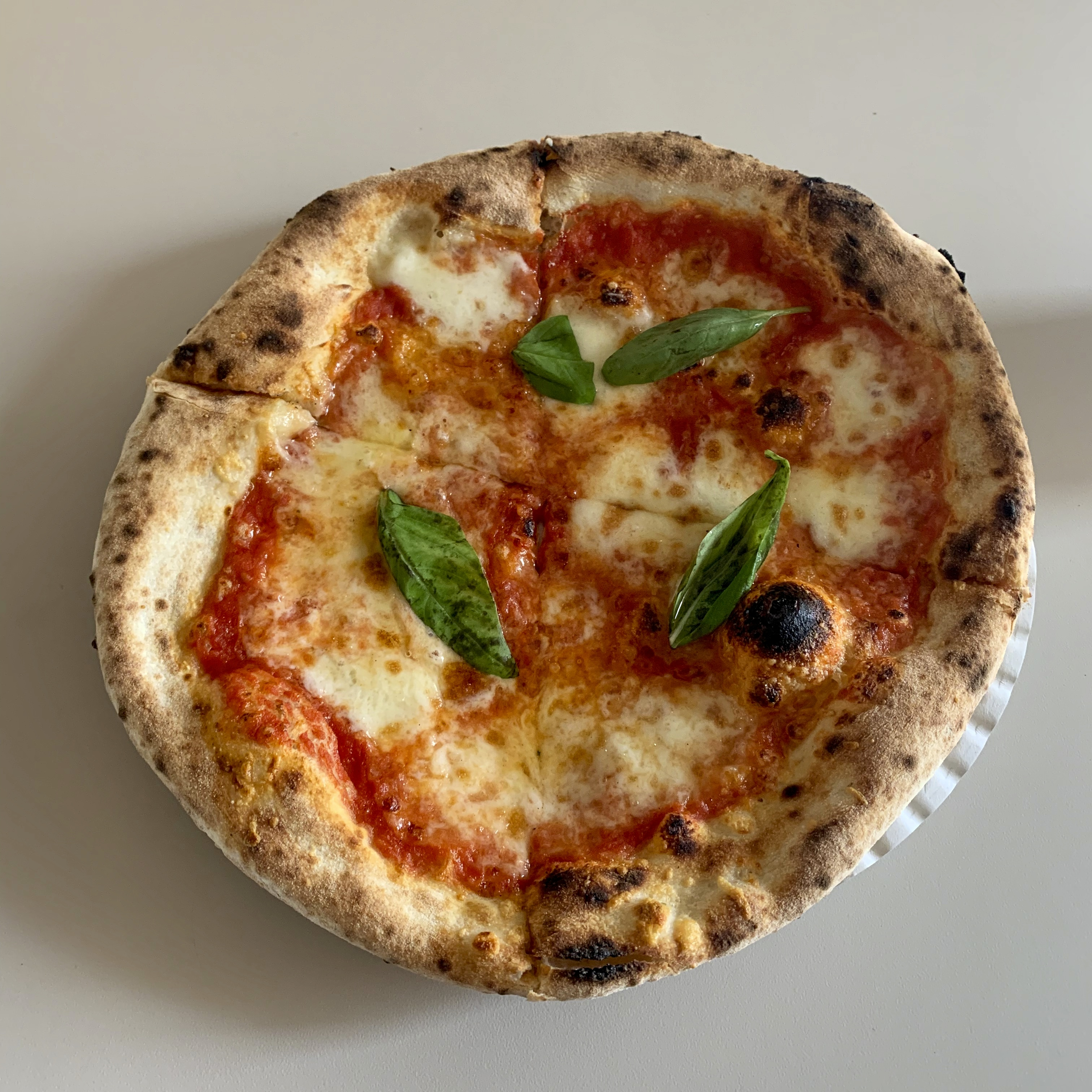
- Alternative names: Pizza napoletana (in Italian), pizza napulitana (in Neapolitan)
- Type: Pizza
- Place of origin: Italy
- Region or state: Naples, Campania
- Main ingredients: Although in the strictest tradition of Neapolitan cuisine there are only two variations (pizza Margherita and pizza marinara), a great number of Neapolitan pizza varieties exist, defined by the choice of toppings.
- Variations: Pizza Margherita, pizza marinara

Art of Neapolitan 'Pizzaiuolo'
- UNESCO Intangible Cultural Heritage
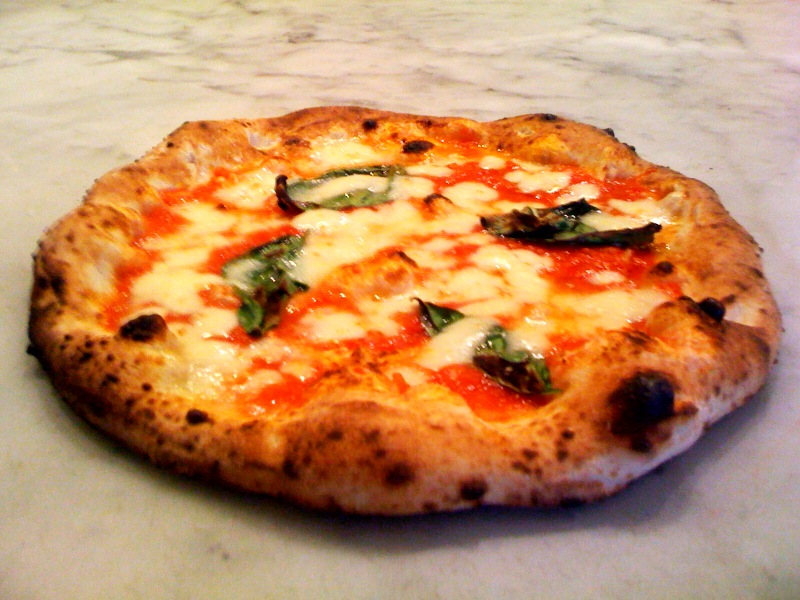
- Country: Italy
- Reference: 00722
- Region: Europe and North America

Inscription history
- Inscription: 2017 (12th session of the Committee session)
- List: Representative List of the Intangible Cultural Heritage of Humanity

Neapolitan pizza (Italian: pizza napoletana; Neapolitan: pizza napulitana) is the version of the round pizza typically prepared in the Italian city of Naples and characterised by a soft, thin dough with high edges. The tomatoes are traditionally either San Marzano tomatoes or pomodorini del Piennolo del Vesuvio, which grow on the volcanic plains to the south of Mount Vesuvius, and the cheese is traditionally mozzarella di bufala campana or fior di latte di Agerola. Pizza napoletana is a traditional speciality guaranteed (TSG) product in the European Union and the United Kingdom, and the art of making it (arte del pizzaiolo napoletano) is included on UNESCO's list of intangible cultural heritage.

== Recipe ==
According to the rules proposed by the Associazione Verace Pizza Napoletana (AVPN), the genuine Neapolitan pizza dough consists of wheat flour, natural Neapolitan yeast or brewer's yeast, salt, and water. The dough is always fat-free and sugar-free. The regulations specify that the dough must be made primarily from a medium-strength (W value of 250–320; 11–13.5% protein), finely ground wheat flour, with no more than 20% of the flour being strong flour (W value above 350).

The dough must be kneaded by hand or with a low-speed mixer. After the rising process, it must be formed by hand without the help of a rolling pin or other machine and may be no more than 0.25 cm in height. The pizza must be baked for 60–90 seconds in a 485 °C (905 °F) wood-fired oven.

== UNI and traditional speciality guaranteed ==
Italian: (La "Verace Pizza Napoletana" (vera pizza napoletana) va consumata appena sfornata; qualora non sia consumata nel locale di produzione non può essere congelata o surgelata o posta sottovuoto per una successiva vendita.)

(The "Verace Pizza Napoletana" (true Neapolitan pizza) should be eaten as soon as it comes out of the oven; if it is not consumed in the production room it cannot be frozen or deep-frozen or vacuum-packed for subsequent sale.)

— Article 2.5 of the specifications for the definition of international standards for obtaining the "Verace Pizza Napoletana" mark

Neapolitan pizza has a protected status granted by the Italian Standardization Body administered by the Associazione Verace Pizza Napoletana (AVPN). A protected designation is available to pizzerias that meet strict requirements in following Neapolitan traditions in the art of pizza making. The association enforces its guidelines in part through the use of mystery shoppers.

The European Union has recognised pizza napoletana as a traditional speciality guaranteed since 5 February 2010. The TSG certification attests that a particular food product objectively possesses specific characteristics which differentiate it from all others in its category, and that its raw materials, composition or method of production have been consistent for a minimum of 30 years.

== See also ==
- Neapolitan cuisine
- Pizza Margherita
- Pizza marinara
- Roman pizza
- Sicilian pizza
- List of pizza varieties by country
- Acunto Forni
