= Bizarre Foods with Andrew Zimmern =

American travel and cuisine television show

- Genre: Food, travel
- Starring: Andrew Zimmern
- Country of origin: United States
- No. of seasons: 13
- No. of episodes: 147

Production
- Executive producer: Colleen Steward
- Editors: Troy Heller; Erik J. Fremstad
- Running time: 43 minutes

Original release
- Network: Travel Channel
- Release: November 1, 2006 – August 14, 2008

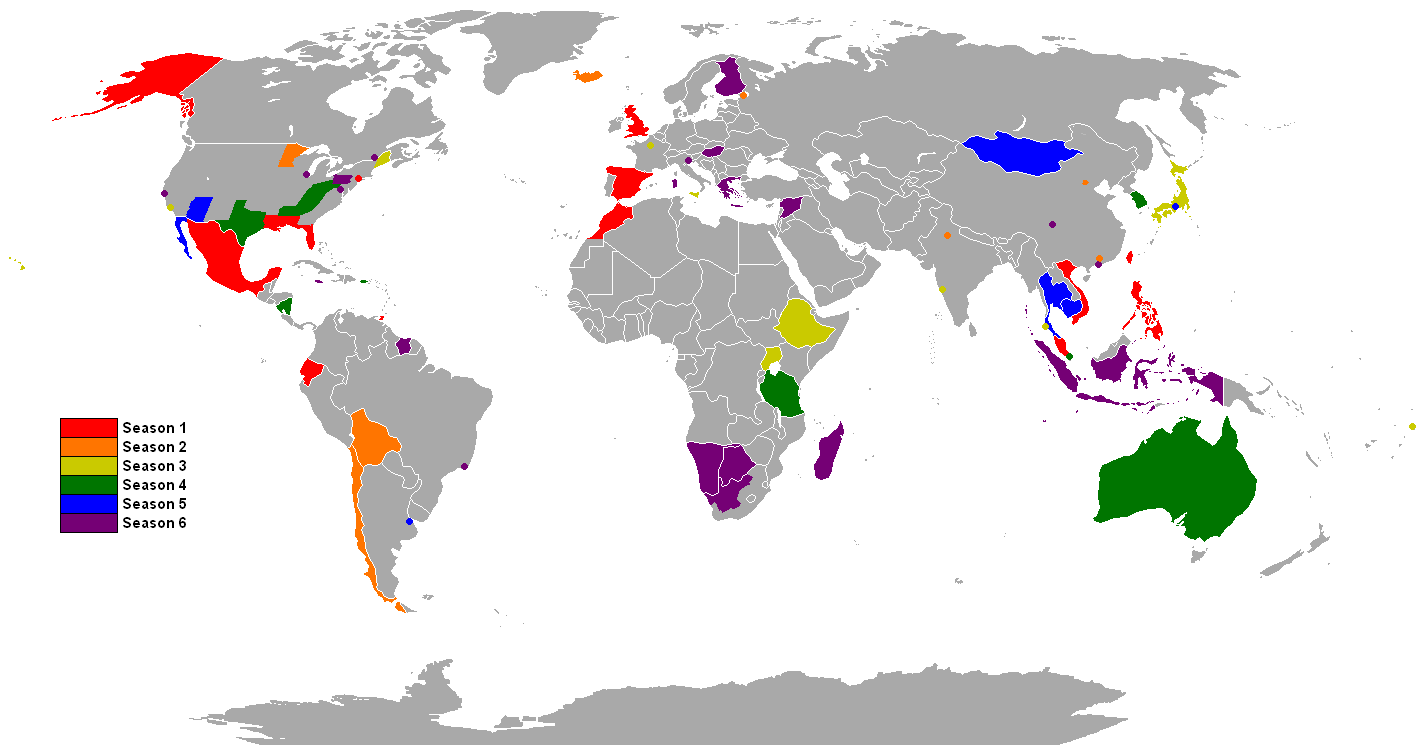
Locations visited by Andrew Zimmern on Bizarre Foods: Season 1; Season 2; Season 3; Season 4; Season 5; Season 6

Bizarre Foods with Andrew Zimmern is a travel and cuisine television show hosted by Andrew Zimmern on the Travel Channel in the US. The first season began on Monday, February 6, 2007, at 9pm ET/PT.

Bizarre Foods focuses on regional cuisine from around the world which is typically perceived as being disgusting, exotic or bizarre. In each episode, Zimmern focuses on the cuisine of a particular country or region. He typically shows how the food is procured, where it is served and, usually without hesitation, eats it.

Originally a one-hour documentary titled Bizarre Foods of Asia, repeated showings on the Travel Channel drew consistent, considerable audiences. In late 2006, TLC decided to turn the documentary into a weekly, one-hour show with the same premise and with Zimmern as the host. In 2009, Zimmern took a break from Bizarre Foods to work on one season of the spin-off Bizarre World.

== Episodes ==
=== Season 1 ===
#	Air date	Location	Notes/Featured Bizarre Foods
Pilot (0)	November 1, 2006	Asia	Pilot episode in Japan, Thailand, and Malaysia. Tokyo: Getemono bar, at Asadachi (1-2-14 Nishi-Shinjuku) raw pig's testicles, Frog sashimi, plus the frog's beating heart, lizard sake, at Yaki Hamna: Giant snails, fugu, at Hibari sushi, raw octopus sushi. at Suppon-Maki restaurant: Suppon (turtle soup) + drink: turtle blood with sake and turtle hearts. Yakitori restaurant: chicken heart yakitori, keel bones, chicken butts, rooster balls. Kobe: Kobe beef. Bangkok: at Silver Palace, bird's nest soup with Hasma, Rambutan, grilled fresh frogs Chiang Mai: pork sausage, fruit bat. Penang: sambal with fish roe, belacan, fermented shrimp paste, poured tea, horseshoe crab, fish maw, durian.
1 (1)	February 26, 2007	Philippines	Balut, Calamansi, Bamboo shoots, Coconut and rice paste wrapped on banana leaves and roasted, Okoy (shrimp pancake), Deep fried fertilized duck eggs, baby chickens marinated, steamed and fried, tokneneng, Ube and cheese-flavor ice cream in a bun. At Balaw Balaw in Angono, Rizal: Balaw-balaw sauce, with fermented shrimp paste, soup Number Five (bull's rectum and testicles soup), uok in adobo, white worms from the larvae of crickets or beetles found in fallen coconut trees, crispy fried Alagaw leaves, ginatang bilo-bilo. At Everybody's Café in San Fernando, Pampanga: Dinuguan, a blood stew, crickets of rice fields cooked in adobo style, Betute Tugak (stuffed frog with pork). Puerto Princesa: Banana skewers, bananas rolled in brown sugar and deep-fried with caramelized sugar crust, fried chicken intestines on a stake. Kinabuchs: seaweed, mussels on a half shell, grilled tuna belly, snails cooked with coconut, tuna collars grilled. Puerto Princesa Subterranean River National Park, mangrove worms.
2 (2)	March 5, 2007	Morocco	Marrakesh: Mashwi, roasted lamb, sheep's head steamed, tongue and eye, snails in turmeric broth, beef tongue, cow's heart, pancreas stuffed with rice and raisins. Khlea, dried cooked meat preserved in fat, cooked with eggs. Ouarzazate: Tajine with chicken and vegetables, mint tea, grilled kidneys, kefta, sausages. Essaouira: cuttlefish, stingray, sardines. Eureka: couscous with goat and vegetables. Chahramans Restaurant, Marrakesh: Pastilla with pigeon, Briouat. Jemaa el-Fnaa: poached calf's brain.
3 (3)	March 12, 2007	Ecuador	Quito: Guinea pig, empanada. Motes de la Magdalena: menudo (tripe soup), cuero de librillo (outer lining of the cow stomach), guatita with the inner lining of cow stomach. Otavalo: motes, roast pork with skin, fried cheese empanada, elixir with aloe vera, jugo de sabila, and vitamin extracts. Puerto Francisco de Orellana, Napo River: lemon ants, piranha, coconut grubs, chicha. Zimmern participates in a cleansing ritual.
4 (4)	March 19, 2007	Spain	Madrid: Tapas; Casa Botín: Cochinillo asado, baby eels, baby squid braisend on their ink. La Zapatería: cruncy pig ears, snails, polbo á feira (octopus), bull's tails Toño Sánchez: callos, casserole with blood sausage and tripe Market: mojama, criadillas (bull testicles), tripe. Museo del Jamón: Serrano, Ibérico, Bellota, head cheese. La trainera: Goose barnacle, shrimp, turbot, crab. Barcelona: La Bouqueria: razor clams, deep-fried worms, crickets. La Gardunya: Calf's brain, horchata Les Cols: Rooster comb risotto Ferran Adrià: El Bulli.
5 (5)	March 26, 2007	The Gulf Coast	Morgan City, Louisiana: Nutria, squirrel Maurice, Louisiana: Herbert's Specialty Meats, Turducken, Soop's: boudin, stuffed beef tongue New Orleans: Cochon restaurant, boudinballs, head cheese, smoked ox stew, deep fried chicken liver. Hattiesburg: Leathe's restaurant, opossum, raccoon; Serendipity Deli and Restaurant: chitterlings. Mobile: Wintzell's Oyster House, fried green vinegar pickled peppers, fried green tomatoes with crayfish sauce, 33 oysters. Alligator Alley, The Wash House Restaurant: alligator feast. Pensacola, Fish House restaurant: black grouper throats, gazpachee salad with hardtack. Chef's restaurant: flathead mullet deep fried, gizzard, fried mullet roe.
6 (6)	April 2, 2007	United Kingdom	Edinburgh: Crombie's haggis, hunted pheasant Swansea: faggot, cockles and whelks, laverbread. Cotswolds: jugged hare, kidney and liver meatballs, Christmas pudding. London: Harrods, jellied eels, blood tongue sausage. In East End, F. Cooke, pie and mash, stewed eels. Borough Market, Roast restaurant, pigeon, ox heart grilled with bone marrow sauce, herring roes, Neil Yard Dairy, Stinking Bishop cheese Banger shop, fresh Italian gelato.
7 (7)	July 9, 2007	Trinidad and Tobago	Tobago: Iguana curry with dumplings, conch and relative penis in ceviche. Trinidad: Original souse king, souse, pig's and chicken's feet, cow skin soup. Saint James, Trinidad and Tobago, Street food: roti stuffed with goat and liver, doubles, cow heel's soup. Maracas Beach: callaloo, "Bake n' shark sandwich, fried bread stuffed with deep fried shark with sauces and vegetables, king mackerel sashimi. Note: Starting with this episode, an updated intro music debuts while being composed, sung, and produced by Kurt Gellersted.
8 (8)	July 16, 2007	Mexico	Huatulco: Shellfish, scallops, oysters, sea snails, mussels, abalone, octopus, El Grillo Marinero Restaurant: with garlic sauce or stewed in its own ink, cocktail de pulpo. Oaxaca: grasshopper (chapulines), armadillo, tacos, jumiles, ant eggs (escamoles), maguey worms, mosquito eggs, chicken feet, red snapper (huachinango), corn smut (huitlacoche), mole and duck enchilada. Mexico City
9 (9)	July 23, 2007	Alaska	Beluga and Bowhead whale muktuk (fermented blubber), spruce tea, Alaskan ice cream, whitefish, fermented fish heads, seal soup, walrus, jellied moose nose, reindeer pizza, ptarmigan. Zimmern goes on a sled dog tour.
10 (10)	July 30, 2007	Taiwan	Stinky tofu, unborn chicken eggs, cockscomb, chicken uterus, fermented meat, black-bone chicken testicles, fried bees.
11 (11)	August 6, 2007	New York City	Special episode with guest Anthony Bourdain. Tongue sandwich, geoduck, live lobster, ceviche, pupusas, worm pretzels, maggot pupae, tarantula pops, teriyaki cockroaches, jellyfish salad, sea cucumber salad, goose intestine, frog congee, salo.
12 (12)	August 13, 2007	Vietnam	Cobra parts including beating heart and dried bones, civet dropping coffee, pig's ears, silk worms, scorpions, roasted sparrows, bull penis, horseshoe crab, hybrid duck, mantis prawn, ship worms, and sea snails. Zimmern also visits a fish sauce factory.
13 (13)	November 28, 2007	Memorable Moments	Season 1 recap with some of its highlights, including lamb's head, guinea pig, roast pigeon, worms, grubs, armadillo, and stinky tofu. Also included were outtakes and unaired scenes.
14 (14)	February 26, 2008	Best Bites	Season 1 recap with some of its highlights, including balut, hen's uterus, grubs, conch, ptarmigan, jellied eels, nutria, octopus and souse. Also included were unaired scenes and a preview of season 2.

=== Season 2 ===
#	Air date	Location	Notes/Featured Bizarre Foods
15 (1)	March 4, 2008	Beijing, China	Cicada, seahorse, sea urchin, donkey rib and tail stew and skin, dried tree lizard, sea cucumber, camel paw, pig stomach, dao jiao, snake penis, fried deer penis, yak penis, whelk over dry ice.
16 (2)	March 11, 2008	Iceland	Hákarl, grilled puffin, slátur (a type of blood pudding), skyr, lamb hot dog, geothermal cooking: langoustine, minke whale (not shown on Iceland episode but shown during the 3/3/09 "Surf's Up" episode).
17 (3)	March 18, 2008	St. Petersburg, Russia	Vobla, borscht, cow's tongue, kvass, herring blini, salo, pickled lamprey, brown bear meat, caviar, shashlik.
18 (4)	March 25, 2008	Minnesota	Pig's foot, lutefisk, reuben on a stick, spaghetti and meatballs on a stick, gator on a stick, teriyaki ostrich on a stick, wild boar's liver, brain, and testicles, venison, sauerkraut pie, deep fried chicken gizzards, goober burger (with peanut butter and mayonnaise), herring roe.
19 (5)	April 1, 2008	Bolivia	Lamb kidneys, tripe, bull penis soup, all-organ dish, llama brain and tongue, carpaccio, pickled pig's feet, lamb jerky, chitterlings, mocochinchi (peach juice with cinnamon), llama jerky, chuño, mangosteen, armadillo, feral pig, quinoa, Titicaca Orestias.
20 (6)	April 8, 2008	Chile	Abalone, Pacific razor clams, cow udder, braided intestines, blood sausage, lúcuma juice, donkey milk, cow's butt sandwich, barnacles, mussels, seaweed, horse, conger eel, live sea squirt, fresh bull testicle and scrotum stew, lamb's blood pudding.
21 (7)	April 15, 2008	Guangzhou, China	Grilled squid, dim sum with chicken feet, stuffed duck's feet, stir-fried milk with shrimp, turtle soup, pigeon, scorpion, suckling pig, jellyfish salad, worm and hairy crab roe omelet, wood ear mushroom, frog legs, 60 meter long noodle, stinkhorn, hairy gourd, starfish being used for decoration.
22 (8)	April 29, 2008	Delhi, India	Pomfret, lentil, brain curry, mutton liver and kidney stew, tandoori roti, goat and lamb testicles, paneer, boiled banana flower, banana plant stem, fruit sandwich, panipuri, lassi, mutton balls, gushtaba, chapati.

=== Season 3 ===
#	Air date	Location	Notes/Featured Bizarre Foods
23 (1)	September 9, 2008	Phuket, Thailand	Fried grasshoppers, pork liver and beef stomach and intestine soups, coconut balls, stretched squid, stuffed mackerel, wasp larvae, stir-fried stingray, mole crabs, wasabi-, chili-, and tom yum-flavored cashews and cashew apple juice at a cashew factory, red weaver ants, forest lizards, fish stomach sauce, deep-fried fish skin, horseshoe crab, sea whelk.
24 (2)	September 16, 2008	Sicily, Italy	Cow stomach soup, mystery meat soup, beef spleen sandwich, sardine meatballs, gourmet cow's mouth, Cerda Artichoke Festival: fried, roasted, marinated, and frittata artichoke, and artichoke gelato on a bun, chocolate rabbit, cinnamon pudding, bottarga, tuna heart and sperm, cuttlefish eggs and pasta with ink, sea snails.
25 (3)	September 23, 2008	Goa, India	Bora berry, chouricos (spicy pig offal and fat sausage), pickled mackerel, vindaloo, hilsa fish roe, Bombay duck, chicken xacuti, pomfret, prawns, chickpea sandwich, golgappa (chickpea-stuffed pastries), chili fritters, betel nuts, sorpotel, mushroom and lentil curry, potatoes and rice in sour mango sauce cow urine herb drink Zimmern visits the Sahakari Spice Farm and tries Ayurveda and yoga.
26 (4)	September 30, 2008	Samoa	Samoan apple, se'a (sea cucumber intestines), pork pies, mutton, umu-cooked eel, whole pig cooked in 'umu oven, raw tuna eyeballs and still-beating heart, giant clam, roasted tree grubs, fruit bat roasted on coconut husks.
27 (5)	October 7, 2008	Paris	Terrine, head cheese, lardo, pressed duck with duck sauce and marrow, blood sausage, squab, gourmet mustard, truffles, refined cheese, rabbit liver, bacon and eggs ice cream, lamb tongues, sea urchin, snail caviar, escargot. Zimmern visited the Rungis market, a mustard shop, Paris's best cheese shop, and a snail farm.
28 (6)	October 14, 2008	Los Angeles	Head cheese, slow-cooked piglet in goose fat, pig ears, tongue salad, and eyeballs, scorpions on toast, South American ants on string potatoes, crickets, worms, shot of wheatgrass and barley, "rawsagna" with ground sunflower seeds, flax, cherry tomatoes, and dates, hemp-sunburger on flax flatbread, coconut-durian smoothie, soondae, hot dog burrito, cow's tongue sandwich from the taco truck, monkfish with caviar, sea urchin roe, Santa Barbara shrimp sashimi, octopus tirodido, menudo, corn smut, nopal salad, grasshoppers, whole catfish, deep-fried chicken testicles, Peking duck, cockscombs. Zimmern went to a vegan supper and a Hispanic family's feast. Featuring special guest chefs Wolfgang Puck, Ben Ford and Ani Phyo and Los Angeles food blogger Eddie Lin .
29 (7)	October 21, 2008	Halloween (special)	This special discussed unfamiliar foods that are considered scary and what made Westerners uneasy about them. Zimmern then hosted a Halloween party with Bizarre Foods fans where he served his favorite fares. He discussed drinking blood with the food historian and author Linda Civitello, which is based on culture and status. The anthropology director at the University of Minnesota, William Beeman, explained about fear of bugs and organ meat, saying that people are more likely to eat insects with a side. The chef Patrick Lue Chai, at whose restaurant Zimmern ate in Los Angeles, cooked fried crickets with potato strings as well as other insects for the party. Appetizers at Zimmern's feast were tarantula, waterbugs, grasshoppers, hissing cockroaches, and Thai stir-fried ants and crickets. The entrees were fresh cow's blood, raw goat kidney, chicken feet and guinea pig.
30 (8)	October 28, 2008	Hawaii	Imu-cooked kalua pig, poi, aʻama crab, heʻe luau (octopus w/ taro leaves), bonefish, Spam musubi, pineapple upside-down cake with Spam, guava-glazed Spam, tempura Spam, naʻau (wild boar offal and blood), ono with lavender sauce, lamb with lavender salt and pepper, goat with Maui onion and chili peppers, Hawaiian fusion - natto, clams, wasabi, and soy, local escargot, caviar, seaweed, goat stew with intestines and bile, opihi.
31 (9)	November 11, 2008	Ethiopia	Fermented enset fiber pancakes and porridge, raw sautéed beef, ayib cheese, unfiltered honey, berbere, goat organs in ox intestines, crepe with chicken and onion, coffee, sorghum popcorn, fresh raw beef and camel kidney. In Addis Ababa, Zimmern shopped at Africa's largest market and in Harar he fed meat to wild hyenas.
32 (10)	November 18, 2008	Maine	Flounder roe soup with seaweed, sea cucumber, fiddleheads, beaver chili, bean-hole beans, wild ramps, stinging nettle soup, Indian cucumber, cattail, raw lobster, whelks, cod sperm chowder, monkfish head stew, BBQ junebugs, oysters with ramps, snails with periwinkle and butter, moose and venison terrine, duck tartare. Zimmern went lobster fishing with Linda Greenlaw and judged a Deathmatch Maine Bizarre Foods contest with his father, a native of Portland.
33 (11)	November 25, 2008	Happy Holidays (Special)	Braised dried oysters with black hair moss, English goose, pig's feet and lentils, snot (sweet potato starch), cow cod soup, rabbit and wheatberries, Swedish meatballs, cuttlefish eggs, pork intestine soup with red dates, tobacco-wrapped cheese, porcupine stuffed with potatoes and bacon, sweet noodle kugel, spritz cookies, sweet fish-shaped cake. Zimmern hosted a holiday pitch-in party with chefs and friends he made around the world. It was at a historic mansion in Minneapolis and the food was cooked at the Calhoun Beach Club.
34 (12)	December 2, 2008	Uganda	Lungfish, white ants lured by drumming, matoke (steamed green bananas), braised goat with peanut and sesame sauce, grasshopper, squirrel, millet bread, goat stomach lining and intestines, Nile perch, rotten goat meat from a Ugandan drive-through, roasted corn, mixed grill (intestine-encased organs), cane rat with tilapia from Lake Victoria and raw Nile crocodile. Zimmern takes part in a spiritual possession ceremony while in one village.
35 (13)	December 9, 2008	Japan	River eels, sea squirts, stonefish liver, Bluefin tuna eyeballs, mayonnaise fondue and milkshake, octopus egg sac, sea cucumber egg jerky, turtle blood sake, octopus ice cream, pit viper ice cream, beef tongue ice cream, horumon, takoyaki, raw horse mane, funazushi, squid ink soup, stewed tuna eyes in mirin, giant sea snail, sea snake soup (smelling sea snake anus in the market), raw goat testicles with scrotum.
36 (14)	February 10, 2009	Sexy food	This episode was a Valentine's Day special. It was a compilation episode about the cultural connections between food and sex, featuring foods that are supposed to be aphrodisiacs or are made of sexual organs of animals. Zimmern visited the Mall of America where he gave out samples of bull testicles to see people's reactions and if they would eat it when told it would help their sex life. The author and food historian Linda Civitello talked about the history of eating reproductive organs. At the Midtown Global Market, Zimmern interviewed people about foods that were supposed aphrodisiacs, including chocolate and oysters. He handed out chocolate-covered meal worms and crickets that tricked people into thinking they were pretzels. At the end, Zimmern and some others ate sushi off a naked woman, a practice called nyotai mori.
37 (15)	March 3, 2009	Surf It Up	Compilation episode

=== Season 4 ===
#	Air date	Location	Notes/Featured Bizarre Foods
38 (1)	April 14, 2009	Tanzania	Zimmern samples the traditional Tanzanian breakfast called supu, soup made with goat lungs, heart and liver, as well as cow stomach, intestines and tongue. He also travels to the famous Mount Kilimanjaro and Ngorongoro Crater. Visiting a local tribe, he tries such delectables as fresh cow's blood and the coagulated form of it. The blood is obtained by shooting an arrow at close distance into the jugular vein so that the wound heals quickly and the cow is not harmed.
39 (2)	April 21, 2009	Seoul, South Korea	Zimmern feasts on the country's most authentic soups, barbecues and fermented foods. His Asian adventure goes beyond eating when he makes his first batch of fresh kimchi. He also eats raw octopus (san-nakji), chueo-tang, samgyeopsal, tteokbokki, soondae and haejang-guk.
40 (3)	April 28, 2009	The Outback	Zimmern goes into the Australian Outback where he eats wallaby with Aborigines, samples crocodile cooked on the barbecue and makes a meal out of poisonous cane toads.
41 (4)	May 5, 2009	Appalachia	Zimmern goes to the Appalachian Mountains for a taste of the region's culture and its food. The mountain range runs north to south touching more than a dozen states, and many of the people in the area still maintain the traditions and foods that were a part of life for their ancestors.
42 (5)	May 12, 2009	Eastern Australia	Zimmern goes snorkeling, spear fishing and visits a farm where they pamper their cattle. He makes a stop at the Sydney Fish Market where he samples bizarre food he has never tasted before, including Moreton Bay bug, Balmain bug, flathead fish and spanner crabs.
43 (6)	May 19, 2009	Singapore	Zimmern goes to Singapore to experience the diversity of food and culture. The melting pot is seen everywhere, including the Hawker Stalls where he samples tasty treats.
44 (7)	May 26, 2009	Texas	Zimmern samples some of the most outrageous food creations at the Texas State Fair, including nitrogen frozen dessert, chocolate bacon and fried alligator. He alsohas a behind-the-scenes tour of the kitchens at NASA to taste space food. A fried peanut butter, jelly and banana sandwich, fried Coke, javalina, barbacoa, sweetbreads, cabrito
45 (8)	June 2, 2009	Nicaragua	Zimmern visits Nicaragua, "the land of lakes and volcanoes", tasting everything from juicy cheese worms to bull balls soup and raw bull balls ceviche. He visits a bush doctor in the Atlantic port town of Bluefields, eats a family rondon stew, and treks up into the Matagalpa highlands for some "black gold" where he learns how to do "the slurp" with master coffee cupper Julio Obregón.
46 (9)	June 9, 2009	Puerto Rico	Zimmern travels to Puerto Rico where the flavors of the food tell the history of the island, from the deep-fried treats brought in by Africans to the roasted pork made popular by the Spanish. He tries a variety of traditional foods, including a stew made with different parts of a pig.
47 (10)	June 16, 2009	Survival Special	Zimmern is dropped in the jungles of Mexico, where he learns how to live off the land. It is a journey where his stomach, mind and body are tested. He takes extreme to a new level, surviving with only a handful of helpful tools or objects and eating only foods he can forage in the woods.

=== Season 5 ===
#	Air date	Location	Notes/Featured Bizarre Foods
48 (1)	April 26, 2010	Thailand (Isan region)	Zimmern goes to a roadside Farmers' market near Udon Thani. He mentions a personal rule that he must try something twice. He then visits a couple of farming families/villages, the annual winter fair in the city of Udon Thani, and lastly a silk village.
49 (2)	May 3, 2010	Cambodia	Zimmern goes to a Skuon, Phnom Penh, Sisophon, Battambang, and the Tonlé Sap region (Chong Khneas floating village), visiting markets, street vendors, cities, bat caves, and Angkor
50 (3)	May 10, 2010	Mongolia	Zimmern visits a meat market and the central market in Ulaanbaatar, a nomadic family living in Gers in the steppe on the edge of the Gobi Desert, rides a horse with help from an amateur child racer, takes an archery lesson, a throat singing lesson, and meets some contortionists.
51 (4)	May 17, 2010	Arizona	Zimmern goes to Monument Valley and visits a Navajo family, the Phoenix/Tucson corridor, South Tucson, learns to build a deadfall trap in the desert of Northern Arizona, goes on a machine gun adventure in Scottsdale, visits the Arizona State Fair, and Sedona.
52 (5)	May 24, 2010	A Kid's Guide	Zimmern meets young adventurous eaters around the world, from children who try fried frog legs in Florida to children in Tanzania who show him how to eat clotted cow's blood.
53 (6)	May 31, 2010	Tokyo	Zimmern goes to the biggest fish market in Tokyo, visits a Tokyo Tuna restaurant, Horamon restaurant, Visits Alcatraz ER: theme restaurant, Visits the home of Dr. Nakamats, watches sumo wrestlers in a stable
54 (7)	June 7, 2010	Bangkok	Exotic eats in Bangkok are sampled.
55 (8)	June 14, 2010	Baja, Mexico	Zimmern explores unique food traditions on Mexico's Baja Peninsula, from street carts to high-end cuisine. Cities visited include Tijuana, Ensenada and La Paz, Baja California Sur.
56 (9)	June 21, 2010	Buenos Aires, Argentina	Zimmern visits Buenos Aires and explores its meaty culture.

=== Season 6 ===
#	Air date	Location	Notes/Featured Bizarre Foods
57 (1)	January 18, 2011	Syria	Zimmern visits the Umayyad Mosque in the Old City of Damascus, the ancient Roman city of Palmyra, a Bedouin tent in the desert, Aleppo, then goes back to the New City of Damascus. In Damascus, he eats fresh camel after slaughter, shawarma, and Syrian ice cream and cheese. In Aleppo, he tries ful, pistachio candy, Arabic bread, and camel hump sausage. He also eats roast goat with a Bedouin family.
58 (2)	January 25, 2011	Pennsylvania	Andrew makes some kielbasa and tries cheesesteak and fugu in Philadelphia. In White Haven he has scrapple at the Redneck Ranch and eats snapping turtle soup in Drums.
59 (3)	February 1, 2011	Venice	Zimmern tries out glassblowing on Murano island and fishing in the Venetian Lagoon. Here he eats calves' liver, snails, cuttlefish in ink, beef carpaccio, salt cod, fresh crayfish, and donkey salami.
60 (4)	February 8, 2011	Madagascar	Zimmern visits Madagascar, where many natives still live the way they did hundreds of years ago, hunting and gathering for their food. Morandava: king mackerel, baobab tree seeds, beef and cassava, giraffe beetles, river eel. With his wife Reisha, he buys a zebu to be given as a gift at a ritual circumcision ceremony.
61 (5)	February 15, 2011	Chicago	Zimmern visits the Vienna Beef factory, visits a hot dog restaurant, tries molecular gastronomy at Alinea with Grant Achatz and candied delicacies at Graham Elliot's restaurant. Rick Bayless introduces him to his Mexican food and local street food. After a meat-butchering demonstration, he tries pork jowl and kidney. In Albany Park he takes a world tour of cuisine, including Korean fermented cabbage tacos and Iraqi pacha.
62 (6)	February 23, 2011	Namibia	Zimmern visits Namibia, where he meets members of a semi-nomadic tribe whose way of life hasn't changed in hundreds of years. Catatura: smiley sheep, cow stomach and foot and potatoes, mopane worms in brine, dried catfish. On safari, he tries wildebeest eyeballs, and he goes oyster fishing in Walvis Bay. Visiting the Himba tribe in the Namib, he eats chicha (fermented milk with rice and goat parts).
63 (7)	March 1, 2011	San Francisco	Zimmern checks out alternative food sources in San Francisco, from raising edible bugs (making mealworms, cricket empanadas, and wax moth larva fritters) to foraging in the wild. He rescues dumpster vegetables and dives for abalone. At a spontaneous foraged food dinner, he has mussels with seaweed aioli, escargot with porcini mushrooms, and wild boar raviolis. At Chris Cosentino's restaurant Incanto, he has blood mousse, foie gras ice cream sandwich, prosciutto ice cream, pig intestine tacos, calves' tongue sliders, trotter tots, and brainaise.
64 (8)	March 8, 2011	Greece	Athens: Souvlaki, tripe soup, cow lung soup, roast lamb, kokoretsi, ray, octopus stew, monkfish, scorpionfish, eggplant custard with squid ink. Kalymnos: raw black sea urchin roe, sea squirt, fried ink sacs, slipper lobster, mouri goat.
65 (9)	March 15, 2011	Hong Kong	Zimmern samples snake bile, turtle-jelly soup and medicinal bug tea when he visits Hong Kong, the center for traditional Chinese medicine.
66 (10)	March 22, 2011	Hungary	Zimmern explores old and new food traditions in Hungary. He attends an outdoor feast with a Romani family and meets an acclaimed chef who puts a modern twist on traditional Hungarian favorites.
67 (11)	March 29, 2011	Chengdu	Zimmern tours Chengdu, capital of China's Sichuan province, known for its spicy cuisine. Featured eats include boiling chili and volcano rabbit head.
68 (12)	April 20, 2011	Indonesia	Reusing a large proportion of previously aired footage from Bizarre World - Sulawesi and Bali episodes. In Ubud, Bali, he goes to a pork feast and visits a tooth-filing ceremony. Denpasar: cobra restaurant (blood, gall, marrow, penis, soup, and fried cobra), jackfruit, saba, kelengkeng (longan). In Negara he watches water buffalo racing. Tanatoraja, Sulawesi: salak, water buffalo soup, papyong (spiced pork in bamboo). In Batutumanga he eats snake, eel, and water buffalo entrails soup and visits a funeral celebration.
69 (13)	April 27, 2011	Taste of the Tropics	Reusing a proportion of previously aired footage from Bizarre World - Belize, Cuba and Florida episodes
70 (14)	May 3, 2011	Kalahari	In Johannesburg, he eats medicinal dirt, impala, wildebeest, and water buffalo. With the Ju wasi people in Aha Hills, Botswana, Zimmern tries jewel beetles, porcupine, and small bird, and participates in a dance ritual. Scenes reused from Bizarre World.
71 (15)	May 24, 2011	NYC: Will Work for Food	Zimmern returns to New York City to try his hand at cooking, waiting and street vending to see if he can still cut it.
72 (16)	May 31, 2011	Embassy Row	Zimmern goes to some of the foreign embassies in Washington, DC to taste the different diplomatic food, including those of Sweden, France, Palau, Indonesia, Peru, Kazakhstan, and Finland.
73 (17)	June 7, 2011	Finland	Andrew cooks meals with a family in Lapland and discusses the simple ingredients of Nordic cuisine with a world class chef. Blood cake and lamprey in Helsinki. Tries bear and feeds them at a sanctuary. Hailuoto: seal, cured herring, salmon soup. Reindeer milk, grilled reindeer liver and onion, crayfish, salmon pie.
74 (18)	June 14, 2011	Rio de Janeiro	The diverse food culture of Rio de Janeiro is explored.
75 (19)	June 21, 2011	Suriname	Zimmern treks into the jungle of Suriname in northern South America, sampling the local fare, including wild pig and a rodent-like rabbit called coconi.
76 (20)	June 28, 2011	Fez, Morocco	A culinary tour of Morocco. Featured eats include lamb's head and pigeon pie.
77 (21)	July 5, 2011	Sardinia	Zimmern visits the Mediterranean island of Sardinia to learn about what the locals like to eat, from mountain goats, to sea urchins, to casu marzu (rotten cheese).
78 (22)	July 12, 2011	Montreal	Zimmern is joined by Nadia Giosia on a comprehensive culinary tour of Montreal that includes both traditional and avant-garde cuisine. Montreal-style bagels, duck livers, and horse-heart tartare are among the foods sampled in this multicultural city.
79 (23)	July 19, 2011	Jamaica	An exploration of Jamaican cuisine, which blends island flavors with African traditions.

=== Seasons 7-12 - Bizarre Foods America ===
Beginning with Season 7, the show has been retitled Bizarre Foods America. The format remains the same but focuses more on the United States rather than international travel.

Starting with season 12, Bizarre Foods America has episodes in the other countries of the Americas. New episodes have been shot in Cartagena, Colombia; Lima, Peru; Ft. Worth, Texas; Copper River (Alaska); Nashville, Tennessee; Atlanta, Georgia; the Florida Keys; and Vancouver, British Columbia, Canada.

=== Season 13 Bizarre Foods (Season 7) ===
#	Air date	Location	Notes/Featured Bizarre Foods
80 (1)	October 27, 2014	Mexico City: Corn Smut & Ant Eggs	Stewed pig knuckles; worms and ant eggs; fish egg tamales.
81 (2)	November 3, 2014	Lisbon: Snails, Sardines & Barnacles	Crashing surf to harvest barnacles from the rocky shore; feasting on mounds of mollusks at a huge snail festival; making the world's best canned fish.
82 (3)	November 10, 2014	Ireland: Ancient Bog Butter & Smoked Pigeon	Ultimate smoked salmon; pigeon with bog oak; three-thousand-year-old butter.
83 (4)	November 17, 2014	Factory Food	Artisanal and strange foods from jelly beans to blood pudding to escargot.
84 (5)	November 24, 2014	Brooklyn: Schmaltz & Sea Robins	Fishing for sea robin; grilling dockside; kombucha bacteria pancakes; spleen sandwich.
85 (6)	December 1, 2014	Newfoundland: Moose PIes & Seal Flippers	Fried cod cheek and tongues; moose pie; chicken fried seal flipper.
86 (7)	December 8, 2014	Ethnic Enclaves	Vietnamese meals to Lebanese sweets; Mongolian cooking huts to Japanese chefs.
87 (8)	December 15, 2014	Faroe Islands: Spoiled Sheep & Boiled Birds	Giant horse mussels; fermented sheep head; blood-filled sheep stomach; seagulls.
88 (9)	December 22, 2014	Food Science	The marriage of cooking and science; extracting the essence of flavors; taste sensations not found in nature.
89 (10)	December 29, 2014	BBQ	A buffalo meat tailgate party; Texas pit BBQ; a pig roast in South Carolina; barbecued mutton; chicken hearts in Peru; pork in Korea.
90 (11)	January 5, 2015	Comfort Food	Chopped hogs head in Belize; chitterlings; pig uterus soup; the world's oldest ice cream.
91 (12)	January 12, 2015	Los Angeles: Spleen Soup and Sriracha	Fried fish fins; honey from Africanized bees; the country's hottest sauce.
92 (13)	January 19, 2015	Hawaii's Big Island: Eyeballs and Abalone	Fresh water prawns; abalone; tuna eyeballs.

=== Season 14 - Delicious Destinations (Season 1) ===
A spin-off series of half-hour episodes covering the traditional foods of well-known destinations—their origins, how they're made, and how locals typically eat them. Unlike the parent show, it focused on everyday fare rather than unusual dishes.

#	Air date	Location	Notes/Featured Bizarre Foods
1 (1)	January 26, 2015	Athens	Gyros, souvlaki, loukoumades, spanakopita and Greek yogurt. Rating: 458,000 U.S. viewers
2 (2)	January 26, 2015	Paris	Steak frites, croque-monsieur, artisan baguettes, buttery croissants, macarons and crepes. Rating: 566,000 U.S. viewers
3 (3)	February 2, 2015	New York	Mile-high pastrami sandwiches, bagels and lox, pizza by the slice and American hamburger.
4 (4)	February 2, 2015	London	Traditional Sunday roast, Yorkshire pudding, pie 'n' mash and fish and chips.
5 (5)	February 9, 2015	Florence	Florentine steak, ribollita soup, cappuccino and gelato.
6 (6)	February 9, 2015	Boston	New England clam chowder, scrod, Boston cream pie and Parker House rolls.
7 (7)	February 23, 2015	Barcelona	Tapas and crema Catalana.
8 (8)	March 2, 2015	New Orleans	Po' boys, gumbo, oysters Rockefeller and bananas Foster.
9 (9)	March 9, 2015	Tokyo	Sushi and tempura.
10 (10)	March 16, 2015	Munich	Schnitzel, spätzle, knödel and cake.
11 (11)	March 23, 2015	St. Louis	St. Louis–style barbecue, toasted ravioli, and gooey butter cake.
12 (12)	March 30, 2015	Zürich	Fondue and Swiss chocolate.
13 (13)	April 6, 2015	Hong Kong	Dim sum, congee and roast goose.

=== Season 15 Bizarre Foods (Season 8) ===
#	Air date	Location	Notes/Featured Bizarre Foods
93 (1)	April 13, 2015	Kazakhstan: Hunting with Eagles & Milking Mares	
94 (2)	April 20, 2015	Taipei: Stinky Tofu and Iron Eggs	Zimmern visits Taipei, Taiwan and faces down stinky tofu in a mountains aid factory, learns the secret to turning eggs into hard-as-iron street food, and masters pulling the longest and strongest noodles.
95 (3)	April 27, 2015	Rome: Porchetta, Pecorino and Pizza	
96 (4)	May 4, 2015	Dubai: Carp, Camel and Cocoons	
97 (5)	May 18, 2015	Cold-Blooded Creatures	
98 (6)	May 25, 2015	Panama: Beef Lungs & Love Potions	
99 (7)	June 1, 2015	Ho Chi Minh City: Rat Hearts & Porcupine Parts	Zimmern travels to Ho Chi Minh City, Vietnam and while hitting the city streets at night, he feasts on sucking snails and duck tongues and on the outskirts of town he hunts for rice field rats, and gets a taste of farm-raised porcupine.
100 (8)	June 8, 2015	Peruvian Amazon: Giant Rodents & Biting Ants	
101 (9)	June 15, 2015	San Antonio, Texas: Brains, Balls & Blood	

=== Season 16 - Delicious Destinations (Season 2) ===
#	Air date	Location	Featured Foods (in order of appearance)
14 (1)	July 6, 2015	San Francisco	Cioppino, Crab Louie, San Francisco sourdough bread, egg foo yung, fortune cookie and Mission-style burrito.
15 (2)	July 6, 2015	Jamaica	Jerk chicken, ackee & saltfish, curry goat, mannish water soup, Blue Mountain coffee, gizzadas and Jamaican patty.
16 (3)	July 13, 2015	Atlanta	Southern fried chicken, peach cobbler, country ham and red-eye gravy, pimento cheese, fried green tomatoes and onion rings.
17 (4)	July 20, 2015	Los Angeles	Short rib tacos, Pink's hot dogs, French dip sandwich, #19, tamale mole and Cobb salad.
18 (5)	July 27, 2015	Mexico City	Barbacoa, huarache, Torta de chilaquil, Mexican chorizo, taco al pastor and chicharrónes prensados.
19 (6)	August 3, 2015	Warsaw	Pierogi, kielbasa, zapiekanka, flaczki, bigos and pączki.
20 (7)	August 10, 2015	Dublin	Bacon and cabbage, boxty, Irish soda bread, smoked salmon and coddle.
21 (8)	August 17, 2015	Amsterdam	Poffertjes, stroopwafels, Dutch licorice, Bitterballen, herring and gouda cheese.
22 (9)	August 24, 2015	Montreal	Smoked meat, bagels, Beauty's special, pouding chomeur, poutine and Wilensky's special.
23 (10)	August 31, 2015	Chicago	Chicago-style Deep-dish pizza, Chicago-style hot dogs, Italian beef sandwich, chicken Vesuvio and brownie.
24 (11)	September 7, 2015	Milwaukee	Cheese curds, bratwurst, frozen custard, butter burgers and sauerbraten.
25 (12)	September 14, 2015	Miami	Stone crab, key lime pie, Cuban sandwich, frita, batido, lechon asado and nacatamal.
26 (13)	September 21, 2015	Buenos Aires	Asado, matambre, empanada, choripan, locro and alfajor.

=== Season 17 Bizarre Foods (Season 9) ===
#	Air date	Location	Notes/Featured Bizarre Foods
102 (1)	September 28, 2015	Guatemala: Balls, Brains & Bull's Eyes	Fresh bull testicle ceviche and possum Sunday dinner in Guatemala where ancient flavors are still alive.
103 (2)	October 6, 2015	Croatia Dalmatian Coast: Roasted Rodents & Stone Soup	Ancient tastes in Croatia like roasted dormice and giant offal kebabs to baked rooster and grilled frog.
104 (3)	October 13, 2015	ParisReborn: Cow Heads, Caves & Pig Parts	Mushrooms delivered to the presidential palace; brined ham delivered to the presidential palace; aging artisanal French cheese.
105 (4)	October 20, 2015	Philadelphia: Shad Cakes, Krak & Kishke	Cheesesteak and shad cake to turkey neck and pig liver in Philadelphia where pride brings good food.
106 (5)	November 3, 2015	Oaxaca: Ant Tortillas and Grasshopper Tacos	Winged ants, grilled intestines, grasshoppers and dried beef hearts enjoyed in Mexico's culinary capital.
107 (6)	November 17, 2015	Amsterdam: Squealing Eels & Stroopwafels	Unique re-inventions of traditional Dutch recipes in Amsterdam from goose krokets to insect-filled nuggets to smoked local eel and hollow pig head.
108 (7)	November 24, 2015	Kansas City: Snoots & Spleens	Jiggly pig snoots, spliced spleen, backyard-trapped woodchuck and world-class BBQ in Kansas City.
109 (8)	December 1, 2015	Jerusalem: Kugel, Couscous and Kunafa	Cow udder and veal brain to turkey balls and mullet roe.

=== Season 18 - Delicious Destinations (Season 3) ===
#	Air date	Location	Featured Foods (in order of appearance)
27 (1)	January 26, 2016	Memphis	BBQ ribs and the Elvis sandwich
28 (2)	February 2, 2016	Philadelphia	Cheesesteaks, tomato pie, root beer float, stromboli, sticky buns, scrapple, soft pretzels, water ice, snapper soup and roast pork sandwich.
29 (3)	February 9, 2016	Singapore	Popiah, chilli crab, char kway teow, ais kacang, fish head curry, nasi lemak, satay, chicken rice, wanton mee and laksa.
30 (4)	February 16, 2016	Twin Cities	Walleye, Bundt cake and Jucy Lucy
31 (5)	February 23, 2016	Manila	Lechon, Crispy pata, Adobo, chicken inasal, Halo-halo, Bibingka, Turon, Lumpiang shanghai, Kwek Kwek, Dinuguan, Sisig, Balut and Sinigang
32 (6)	March 1, 2016	Providence	Hot wieners, Johnny cakes, coffee milk, grilled pizza and Rhode Island clam chowder
33 (7)	March 8, 2016	Seattle	Dungeness crab, raw shellfish, salmon sandwich, Seattle dog, sushi and espresso
34 (8)	March 8, 2016	Lima	Ceviche, anticuchos, aji de gallina, causa, tiradito and lucuma.
35 (9)	March 15, 2016	Honolulu	Kalua pig, laulau, poke, Spam musubi, plate lunch and shave ice
36 (10)	March 15, 2016	Marseille	Bouillabaisse, daube, calissons, tapenade, panisses, pissaladiere and ratatouille.
37 (11)	March 22, 2016	Tel Aviv	Falafel, hummus, schnitzel, malabi, shawarma and shakshuka.
38 (12)	March 22, 2016	Albuquerque	Stacked enchilada, green chile cheeseburger, carne adovada, tewa taco, pinon nut rolls and beef jerky.
39 (13)	March 29, 2016	Austin	BBQ brisket, Czech sausage, breakfast tacos, Bob Armstrong dip, Texas chili, Frito pie and chicken-fried steak.
40 (14)	March 29, 2016	Bogotá	Stuffed pork and cheesy hot chocolate.
40 (15)	April 5, 2016	Charleston	Shrimp and grits, she-crab soup and barbecue
41 (16)	April 5, 2016	Louisville	Hot Brown sandwich, country ham, burgoo stew, rolled oysters and derby pie
42 (17)	April 12, 2016	San Juan	Puerto Rican lasagna.
43 (18)	April 12, 2016	Houston	Tex-Mex fajitas, Czech pastry and Cajun mash-ups.
44 (19)	April 19, 2016	Lisbon	Seafood, pork sandwiches and custard tarts.
45 (20)	April 19, 2016	Sicily	Arancini, panino con panelle e crocche, sfincione, cannoli, pasta alla norma and pane ca meusa.

=== Season 19 - Delicious Destinations (Season 4) ===
#	Air date	Location	Featured Foods (in order of appearance)
46(1)	October 4, 2016	Nashville	Hot chicken, whole hog barbecue, pork chops and gravy, biscuits and gravy, chow-chow and chess pie.
47(2)	October 4, 2016	Sydney	Meat pies, Moreton Bay bugs, Sunday roast, kangaroo, hamburger with the works and pavlova.
48(3)	October 11, 2016	Brooklyn	Porterhouse steak, New York–style pizza, chocolate babka, bialy, New York-style cheesecake and pelmeni.
49(4)	October 11, 2016	Rome	Spaghetti alla carbonara, pizza, suppli, carciofi alla giudia, trippa alla romana and filetto di baccala.
50(5)	October 18, 2016	Baltimore	Blue crab, crab cake, pit beef, lake trout, coddies and Berger Cookies.
51(6)	October 18, 2016	Bangkok	Pad thai, pad kra pao gai, tom yum goong, tod mun pla, som tam and mango sticky rice.
52(7)	October 25, 2016	Birmingham	Fried catfish and hushpuppies, barbecued chicken in white sauce, chicken and dumplings, fried green tomatoes, Birmingham hot dog and lemon ice box pie.
53(8)	October 25, 2016	Managua	Baho, nacatamal, vigorón, quesillo, indio viejo and raspado relleno.
54(9)	November 1, 2016	Pittsburgh	Pierogi, kielbasa, stuffed cabbage, greens and beans, Primanti sandwich, fish sandwich and turkey Devonshire.
55(10)	November 1, 2016	Taipei	Niu rou mian, Gua bao, stinky tofu, oyster omelet, xiaolongbao and crab hot pot.
56(11)	November 15, 2016	Cajun Country	Boiled crawfish, gumbo, boudin, oreille de cochon, stuffed turkey wings and fried frog legs.
57(12)	November 15, 2016	Ho Chi Minh City	Banh mi, com tam, pho, bun mam, goi cuon, snails and banh xeo.
58(13)	November 22, 2016	San Diego	California burrito, fish tacos, tostada de pulpo, Caesar salad, chicken adobo and sea urchin.
59(14)	November 22, 2016	Dubai	Kebabs, feteer, Tawa fish fry, pani puri, halwa and machboos.
60(15)	November 29, 2016	Cleveland	Chicken paprikash, fish fry, Slovenian sausage, Polish boy, sauerkraut balls and buckeyes.
61(16)	November 29, 2016	Veracruz	Arroz a la tumbada, vuelvealavida, Chile relleno, picaditas, sopa de mariscos and snapper Veracruz.
62(17)	December 6, 2016	Tucson	Carne seca, chimichangas, Sonoran hot dogs, huevos rancheros, green corn tamales and raspados.
63(18)	December 6, 2016	Seoul	Galbi, banchan, bibimbap, tteokbokki, naengmyeon and sundubu jjigae.
64(19)	December 13, 2016	Detroit	Detroit-style pizza, Coney dog, shawarma, kunufa, soul food and city chicken.
65(20)	December 13, 2016	Edinburgh	Scottish breakfast, Cullen skink, shortbread, blue lobster, haggis and whiskey.
66(21)	December 20, 2016	Vienna	Schnitzel, frankfurter, Sachertorte, tafelspitz, kaiserschmarrn and strudel.
67(22)	December 20, 2016	Santiago	Asado a la parrilla, pastel de Jaiba, sopaipillas, chacarero, congrio a lo pobre and humitas.
68(23)	January 3, 2017	Vancouver	Spot prawns, sushi and king crab, Japadogs and salmon candy.
69(24)	January 3, 2017	Budapest	Stuffed cabbage, goulash, Transylvania chimney cake and a sponge cake trifle.
70(25)	January 10, 2017	Bali	Suckling pig, wok-fried rice and whole slow-roasted duck.
71(26)	January 10, 2017	Copenhagen	New Nordic style seafood, crown herring and pan-fried meatballs.

=== Season 20 Bizarre Foods (Season 10) ===
#	Air date	Location	Notes/Featured Bizarre Foods
118 (1)	January 31, 2017	Lewis and Clark Trail	
119 (2)	February 7, 2017	Southern BBQ Trail	
120 (3)	February 14, 2017	Civil War	
121 (4)	February 21, 2017	Road Tripping Route 66	
122 (5)	February 28, 2017	Great Lakes	
123 (6)	March 7, 2017	The Pacific Coast Highway	

=== Season 21 - Delicious Destinations (Season 5) ===
#	Air date	Location	Notes/Featured Bizarre Foods
72(1)	April 18, 2017	Asheville	BBQ pork, rainbow trout, fried chicken; divine biscuits and red eye gravy.
73(2)	April 18, 2017	Buffalo	Wings, pepperoni pizza, cake doughnuts and meat and potatoes slathered in sauce
74(3)	April 25, 2017	Venice	Beef Carpaccio, tiramisu and cuttlefish
75(4)	April 25, 2017	Milan	Risotto, minestrone and panettone
76(5)	May 2, 2017	Manhattan	Pastrami on rye, black and white cookies, spaghetti with meatballs and smoked fish
77(6)	May 2, 2017	Berlin	Currywurst, Berliner jelly-filled doughnut and Wiener schnitzel
78(7)	May 9, 2017	Dallas	Chicken-fried steak, pecan pie, tortilla soup and steak
79(8)	May 9, 2017	Shanghai	Hairy crab, pork-filled dumplings, rice wine-soaked chicken and scallion pancakes
80(9)	May 16, 2017	Portland	Lobster roll sandwiches, oysters, Italian sandwiches and whoopie pies
81(10)	May 16, 2017	Osaka	Okonomiyaki, octopus fritters and udon noodles topped with fried tofu
82(11)	May 23, 2017	Santorini	Tomato fritters, lamb fricassee and grilled octopus
83(12)	May 23, 2017	Naples	Pizza, pastries stuffed with ricotta and dried fruit, ragu and stewed octopus
84(13)	May 30, 2017	St. John's	Blue mussels, cod au gratin, moose stew and rabbit pie
85(14)	May 30, 2017	Chiang Mai	Coconut curry soup, sausage with pork and chile paste, fish roasted in banana leaves and minced pork salad.
86(15)	June 6, 2017	Toronto	BBQ pork, lobster, Jamaican flatbreads and butter tarts
87(16)	June 6, 2017	Hanoi	Sweet and sour snail soup, ground pork-filled breakfast crepes and sweet potato fritters topped with shrimp
88(17)	June 13, 2017	San Antonio	Puffy tacos, chalupa burger, brisket, barbacoa and stuffed quail
89(18)	June 13, 2017	Oaxaca	Mole negro sauce, Mayan-era tamales, crispy tortilla with pork lard and egg bread dunked in hot chocolate
90(19)	June 20, 2017	Savannah	Shrimp and grits, oysters in a half shell, crab bisque (food) and barbecue stew
91(20)	June 20, 2017	Dubrovnik	Spit-roasted lamb and octopus salad, Dalmatia-style grilled fish.
92(21)	June 27, 2017	Chengdu	Hot pot and Mapo tofu, Kung Pao chicken
93(22)	July 11, 2017	Helsinki	Crayfish boils and fish, reindeer meat and porridge pies
94(23)	July 11, 2017	Mauritius	Fried dumplings and handmade egg noodles, veggie-stuffed flatbread and curried swordfish
95(24)	July 18, 2017	Hyderabad	Potato pastries, fried bread, pancakes and meat and rice

=== Season 22 Bizarre Foods (Season 11) ===
#	Air date	Location	Notes/Featured Bizarre Foods
124 (1)	July 25, 2017	Cowboy Life in Texas	
125 (2)	August 1, 2017	Daniel Boone's Wilderness Trail	
126 (3)	August 9, 2017	Magnificent Mississippi River	
127 (4)	August 15, 2017	Cajun Country Trail	
128 (5)	August 22, 2017	Discovering Columbus	
129 (6)	August 29, 2017	Paul Revere's Midnight Ride	
130 (7)	September 5, 2017	Florida's Conquistador Coast	
131 (8)	September 12, 2017	Yukon Gold Rush Trail	
132 (9)	September 19, 2017	The Mighty Erie Canal	
133 (10)	September 26, 2017	Vegas Road Trip	

=== Season 23 - Delicious Destinations (Season 6) ===
#	Air date	Location	Notes/Featured Bizarre Foods
96(1)	October 3, 2017	Mississippi Delta	Catfish and hushpuppies, oxtails and mud pie
97(2)	October 3, 2017	Panama City	Whole fish and plantains, ceviche and yuca fritters
98(3)	October 10, 2017	Upper Peninsula	Croatian chicken, Lake Superior whitefish and pasties
99(4)	October 10, 2017	Brussels	Belgian waffles, steamed mussels and fries.
100(5)	October 17, 2017	Prague	Pork knuckle, mushroom soup, plum pastries and dumplings.
101(6)	October 17, 2017	Madrid	Roasted piglet, fried calamari sandwiches and tapas
102(7)	October 24, 2017	Cardiff	Lamb stew with root veggies, seafood breakfast and cheesy toast
103(8)	October 24, 2017	Baja	Smoked tuna, fish tacos, Caesar salad, seafood cocktail
104(9)	October 31, 2017	Antigua Guatemala	Enchiladas, tamales, handmade confections and pockets of beans and plantains.
105(10)	October 31, 2017	Marrakesh	Pigeon-meat pies, beef and lentil dishes and whole lamb
106(11)	November 7, 2017	Trinidad and Tobago	Curried crab with dumplings, shark sandwiches and flatbreads
107(12)	November 14, 2017	Reykjavík	Salted cod and lamb hot dogs, skyr
108(13)	November 14, 2017	Quito	Fried pork and potato cakes, ceviche, roasted peanuts, fish soup
109(14)	November 21, 2017	Beijing	Breakfast pancakes, noodles, Peking duck, steamed buns and donkey sandwiches.
110(15)	November 21, 2017	Cartagena	Fried fish and egg arepas, fruits and seafood stews
111(16)	November 28, 2017	Stockholm	Herring, pea soup and pancakes, Jansson's temptation and cinnamon rolls
112(17)	November 28, 2017	Jerusalem	Shawarma, falafel, kubbeh and hummus, halva and bureka
113(18)	December 5, 2017	Phnom Penh	Grilled crab, beef salad, fish and noodle soup
114(19)	December 5, 2017	Cape Town	Sausage, stew, pie, Biltong jerky
115(20)	December 12, 2017	Amman	Goat and veggies, sumac-coated chicken, lamb and fava bean spreads.
116(21)	December 12, 2017	Dominican Republic	Whole roast pig, fried dough pockets.
117(22)	December 19, 2017	Mumbai	Deep-fried fish and prawns, goat over rice and vegetarian dishes, puffed rice salad, potato mash-ups.
118(23)	December 26, 2017	Oslo	Reindeer steak and cured salmon, sheep and heart-shaped waffles
119(24)	December 26, 2017	Key West	Conch fritters, coconut pink shrimp and hogfish sandwiches, Cubanos and Key lime pie

=== Season 24 - Delicious Destinations (Season 7) ===
#	Air date	Location	Notes/Featured Bizarre Foods
120(1)	January 16, 2018	The Hamptons	Surf and turf, lobster rolls, clam chowder, and smoked bluefish pate.
121(2)	January 23, 2018	Queens	Hand-ripped noodles, Thai stir-fries, grilled Greek octopus and pastrami on rye
122(3)	January 30, 2018	Chicago: A Second Bite	Rib tips and Polish sausages
123(4)	February 6, 2018	Door County	Fish and local produce
124(5)	February 13, 2018	Washington, D.C.	Oysters, Ethiopian chicken stew, Chinese stir-fry and chili-smothered sausages.
125(6)	February 20, 2018	Chesapeake Bay	Shellfish in J.O. spice, Virginia ham, peanut soup, bacon-wrapped oysters and fried soft-shell crab.
126(7)	February 27, 2018	Boston: A Second Bite	Black pasta, Irish fish and chips and seafood stew
127(8)	March 6, 2018	Cape Cod	Fried clams and cod, clambakes and cranberry bog ice cream
128(9)	March 13, 2018	Jersey Shore	Saltwater taffy, tomato pie and Italian subs
129(10)	March 20, 2018	New Jersey	Brazilian meat, seafood stew, potato-loaded hot dogs and Dominican marinated pork.
130(11)	March 27, 2018	Kansas City	Barbecue, Croatian dessert bread and marshmallow chocolate candy.
131(12)	April 3, 2018	Denver	Game meats and green chili sauce
132(13)	April 10, 2018	London: A Second Bite	Shepherd's pie, beef Wellington, seekh kebabs and Jamaican jerk chicken.
133(14)	April 17, 2018	Scottish Highlands	Highland beef, shellfish, handheld meat pies and smoked salmon.
134(15)	April 24, 2018	Nova Scotia	Cold-water lobster, seafood chowder, haddock and chips, blueberry grunt and rappie pie
135(16)	May 1, 2018	Quebec City	Maple syrup
136(17)	May 8, 2018	Porto	salty cod in a creamy casserole, white bean and tripe stew, octopus rice and Port wine.
137(18)	May 15, 2018	Frankfurt	Frankfurter and apple wine, pork shoulder with sauerkraut and hand cheese
138(19)	May 22, 2018	Tuscany	Extra virgin olive oil, fish stew over crusty bread, chickpea pancakes and whole fish in spicy tomato sauce.
139(20)	May 29, 2018	Genoa	Seafood salad, pesto with pasta and flatbread
140(21)	June 5, 2018	Emilia-Romagna	Mortadella sausage, parmigiano reggiano and tortellini in broth.
141(22)	June 12, 2018	Paris: A Second Bite	Pot-au-feu and steak tartare.
142(23)	June 19, 2018	Lyon	Pike fish dumplings, breaded beef tripe and pink pralines
143(24)	June 26, 2018	Alsace	Choucroute garnie and foie gras.

=== Season 25 Bizarre Foods (Season 12) ===
#	Air date	Location	Notes/Featured Bizarre Foods
134 (1)	January 23, 2018	The Paul Bunyan Trail	
135 (2)	January 30, 2018	The Jesse James Trail	
136 (3)	February 6, 2018	Germany's Route 66	
137 (4)	February 13, 2018	Italy's Amalfi Coast	
138 (5)	February 20, 2018	Napoleon's March Through Poland	
139 (6)	February 27, 2018	America's First Revolution Trail	
140 (7)	March 6, 2018	Aztec Routes of Mexico	

=== Season 26 Bizarre Foods (Season 13) ===
#	Air date	Location	Notes/Featured Bizarre Foods
141 (1)	July 3, 2018	The Pony Express	
142 (2)	July 10, 2018	William Wallace's March Through Scotland	
143 (3)	July 17, 2018	Captain Cook and the Ancient Hawaiians	
144 (4)	July 24, 2018	WWII Battle of the Bulge	
145 (5)	July 31, 2018	The Saint James Way in Spain	
146 (6)	August 7, 2018	North Carolina's Moonshine Highway	
147 (7)	August 14, 2018	The Underground Railroad	

=== Season 27 - Delicious Destinations (Season 8) ===
#	Air date	Location	Notes/Featured Bizarre Foods
144(1)	August 21, 2018	Montevideo	Asado meats, chivitos and fried beef.
145(2)	August 28, 2018	Guayaquil	Red mangrove crab and plantain dumpling
146(3)	September 4, 2018	Bermuda	Fish chowder, spiny lobster and cassava pie.
147(4)	September 11, 2018	Hollywood	Steak and martinis, Thai steamed whole fish, Armenian flatbread and Persian ice cream.
148(5)	September 18, 2018	Santa Monica	Seafood soup, Chinese chicken salad and Tsukemen.
149(6)	September 25, 2018	Phuket	Crab curry and street snacks.
150(7)	October 2, 2018	Kanazawa	Kano crab and sushi.
151(8)	October 9, 2018	Las Vegas	Quail breast stuffed with foie gras, Wagyu steaks, veal Parmigiana and Thai.

=== Season 28 - Delicious Destinations (Season 9) ===
#	Air date	Location	Notes/Featured Bizarre Foods
152(1)	August 31, 2020	Bangkok: A Second Bite	Steamed whole bass and massaman curry
153(2)	September 7, 2020	Kyoto	Kaiseki and obanzai
154(3)	September 14, 2020	Phoenix	Chilaquiles, Neapolitan pizza and Sonoran hot dogs
155(4)	September 21, 2020	Tahiti	Polynesian ceviche and freshwater shrimp coated in coconut curry sauce
156(5)	September 28, 2020	Puerto Vallarta	Marinated pork, pozole and skewered mojo fish
157(6)	October 5, 2020	Mérida	Slow-roasted pork, pork-stuffed cheese balls in Yucatán sauces
158(7)	October 12, 2020	El Paso	Fajitas, menudo, rolled tacos and entomatadass
159(8)	October 19, 2020	Bay Area	Chinese dim sum, Indian panipuri, American soul food and Mexican tacos
160(9)	October 26, 2020	Aruba	Dutch pea soup, seafood cazuela and cashew cake
161(10)	November 2, 2020	Curaçao	African stews and Dutch cheese
162(11)	November 9, 2020	Seville	Iberico ham, gazpacho and serranito pork sandwiches
163(12)	November 16, 2020	Fez	Tagine-cooked meats, pastilla, zaalouk, bessara and brochettes
164(13)	November 23, 2020	Delhi	Tandoori chicken, goat kebabs, samosas and sweet dough balls
165(14)	November 30, 2020	Goa	Prawn curry, Portuguese chorizo and pork vindaloo

=== Season 29 - Delicious Destinations (Season 10) ===
#	Air date	Location	Notes/Featured Bizarre Foods
166(1)	December 7, 2020	The Bronx	Dry-aged pork sausage and Jamaican meat pastries
167(2)	December 14, 2020	Harlem	Soul food
168(3)	December 21, 2020	Central New York	Beef and veal sausages and half moon cookies
169(4)	December 28, 2020	Martha's Vineyard	Clams and lobster rolls
170(5)	January 25, 2021	Portland	Boozy doughnuts, Thai fish sauce chicken wings and crayfish boils
171(6)	February 1, 2021	Cincinnati	Pork schnitzel, goetta and Cincinnati chili
172(7)	February 8, 2021	Oklahoma City	Prime T-bone steaks, chicken-fried steaks and burger patties mashed with onions, chili with beef, beef bone-infused broth for pho
173(8)	February 8, 2021	Lancaster County	Shoofly pie
174(9)	February 15, 2021	New Hampshire Seacoast	
175(10)	February 22, 2021	Iowa State Fair	Sweet corn, baked sausage cavatelli and Dutch letter pastries, fried pork tenderloin, loose ground beef and Italian Gizmo sandwiches
176(11)	February 22, 2021	Sitka	King salmon, venison and rockfish
177(12)	March 1, 2021	Salt Lake City	Pastrami burger, steak tips with mole and Utah scones
178(13)	March 8, 2021	San Francisco: A Second Bite	Japanese hot pots, hand-crafted lasagna and ice cream
179(14)	March 15, 2021	Charlotte	Barbecue, livermush, fried green tomatoes
180(15)	March 22, 2021	Outer Banks	Blue crab, Hatteras clam chowder and baked oysters
181(16)	March 22, 2021	Chicago Neighborhoods	West Loop handcrafted burgers, Wicker Park street-style tacos in and Bronzeville barbecue
182(17)	March 29, 2021	Glasgow	Macaroni pies and venison haggis
183(18)	April 5, 2021	Cork	Irish stew and drisheen
184(19)	April 12, 2021	Calabria	Fileja noodles with goat and parmigiana di melanzane
185(20)	April 19, 2021	Apulia	Orecchiette pasta, grilled octopus and stuffed pasticiotti pastries

=== Season 30 - Delicious Destinations (Season 11) ===
#	Air date	Location	Notes/Featured Bizarre Foods
186(1)	April 26, 2021	Zagreb	
187(2)	May 3, 2021	Kraków	
188(3)	May 10, 2021	Palm Springs	
189(4)	May 17, 2021	Santa Fe	
190(5)	May 24, 2021	Street Foods	
191(6)	May 31, 2021	Best Beef	
192(7)	June 7, 2021	Southern Comfort Foods	
193(8)	June 14, 2021	Noodles	
194(9)	June 21, 2021	Original Inventions	

== Media ==
A DVD set (2 discs) called Bizarre Foods with Andrew Zimmern: Collection 1 was released on January 8, 2008. It includes the following episodes:

- Morocco
- Spain
- Philippines
- Ecuador
- New York City
- United Kingdom
- America's Gulf Coast
- Mexico

A second DVD set (2 discs) called Bizarre Foods with Andrew Zimmern: Collection 2 was released on October 7, 2008. It includes the following episodes:

- Best Bites
- Iceland
- St.Petersburg
- Minnesota
- Guangzhou, China
- Beijing, China
- Bolivia
- Chile
- Delhi, India
