= Pig snoot =

Pig snout dish

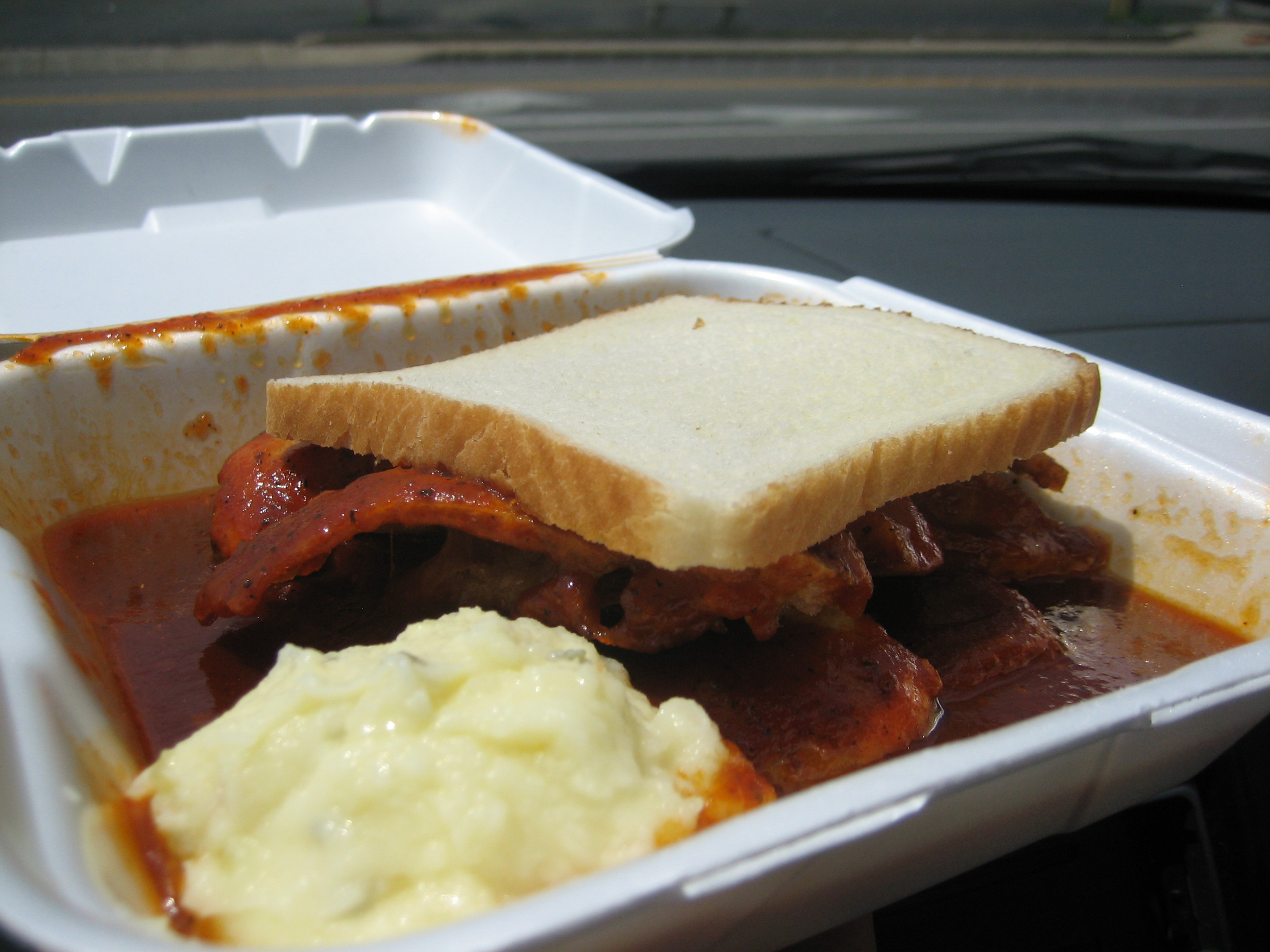
- St. Louis-style barbecue pig snoot sandwich, with potato salad
- Type: Appetizer, sandwich
- Place of origin: Missouri; Kansas City and St. Louis
- Associated cuisine: Midwestern cuisine; Missouri barbecue
- Invented: c. 1940 (St. Louis style)
- Main ingredients: Pork (snout)
- Variations: Fried, pressure-cooked, smoked
- Similar dishes: Pot roast (Kansas City), Chicharrón (St. Louis)

Pig snoot is a Midwestern cuisine dish endemic to Kansas City, Missouri and St. Louis, Missouri, made from the snout of a pig. Often served on white bread as a sandwich, pig snoot is made either as a variety of St. Louis-style barbecue, or the Kansas City pressure cooked & boiled style.

== Preparation and consumption ==
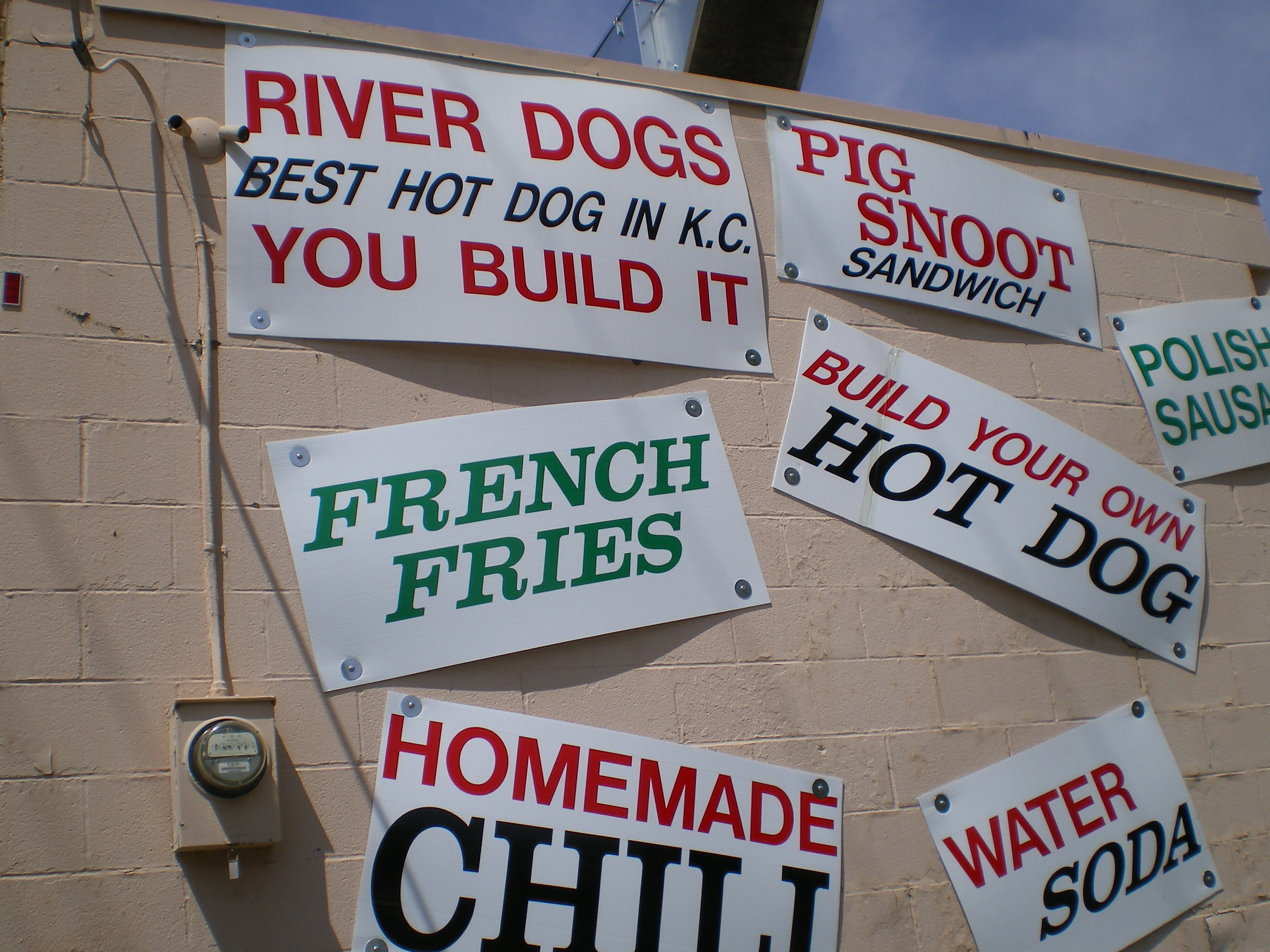
Signs including pig snoot on a hot dog shop in Kansas City, Missouri

A pig snout weighs roughly 1 pound (450 g), and has about .5 inches (1.3 cm) deep of adipose tissue, concentrated at the nostrils. The meaty portion of the pig snout is 43% protein and 2% fat by weight.

=== Kansas City ===
In Kansas City, Missouri, pig snoot is prepared by pressure cooking the snout, then boiling until tender and serving the whole snout on a bun. Food critic Andrew Zimmern described the taste as similar to pot roast with "a latexy, vaseline kicker." Members of the Kansas City Police Department have cadets eat the pig snoot sandwich as an informal hazing rite.

Pig snoot is also smoked in Kansas City as a part of Kansas City-style barbecue.

=== St. Louis ===
In St. Louis, Missouri, pig snoot is prepared as a large 'chip' akin to a chicharrón. The pig snout is shaved and the meat cut away from the nasal cavity with the skin still attached, then fried to a crisp. The snoot is typically served covered in St. Louis-style barbecue sauce, either eaten as a side or as a sandwich. The texture is crunchy yet toothsome; the taste of St. Louis-style pig snoot is described by food critic Andrew Zimmern as 'comparable to (side) bacon.'

According to restaurant "Smoki O's", the dish was first sold in East St. Louis in the 1940s on food trucks.

== In popular culture ==
Pig snoot featured in Andrew Zimmern's food reality television shows Bizarre Foods America S4E9 (in St. Louis, aired August 26, 2013) and mainline show Bizarre Foods episode 108 (in Kansas City, aired November 24, 2015).

In 2005, Danny Meyer sponsored the St. Louis restaurant "Smoki O's", which specializes in pig snoot, to participate in the 4th annual Big Apple BBQ Block Party.
