= Barbecue in Missouri =

Barbecue in Missouri may refer to two distinct styles of preparation:

- Kansas City-style barbecue, typically associated with Kansas City, Missouri, and its surroundings
- St. Louis-style barbecue, typically associated with St. Louis, Missouri, and its surroundings
