= Barbecue sauce =

Sauce used as a marinade, basting, or topping

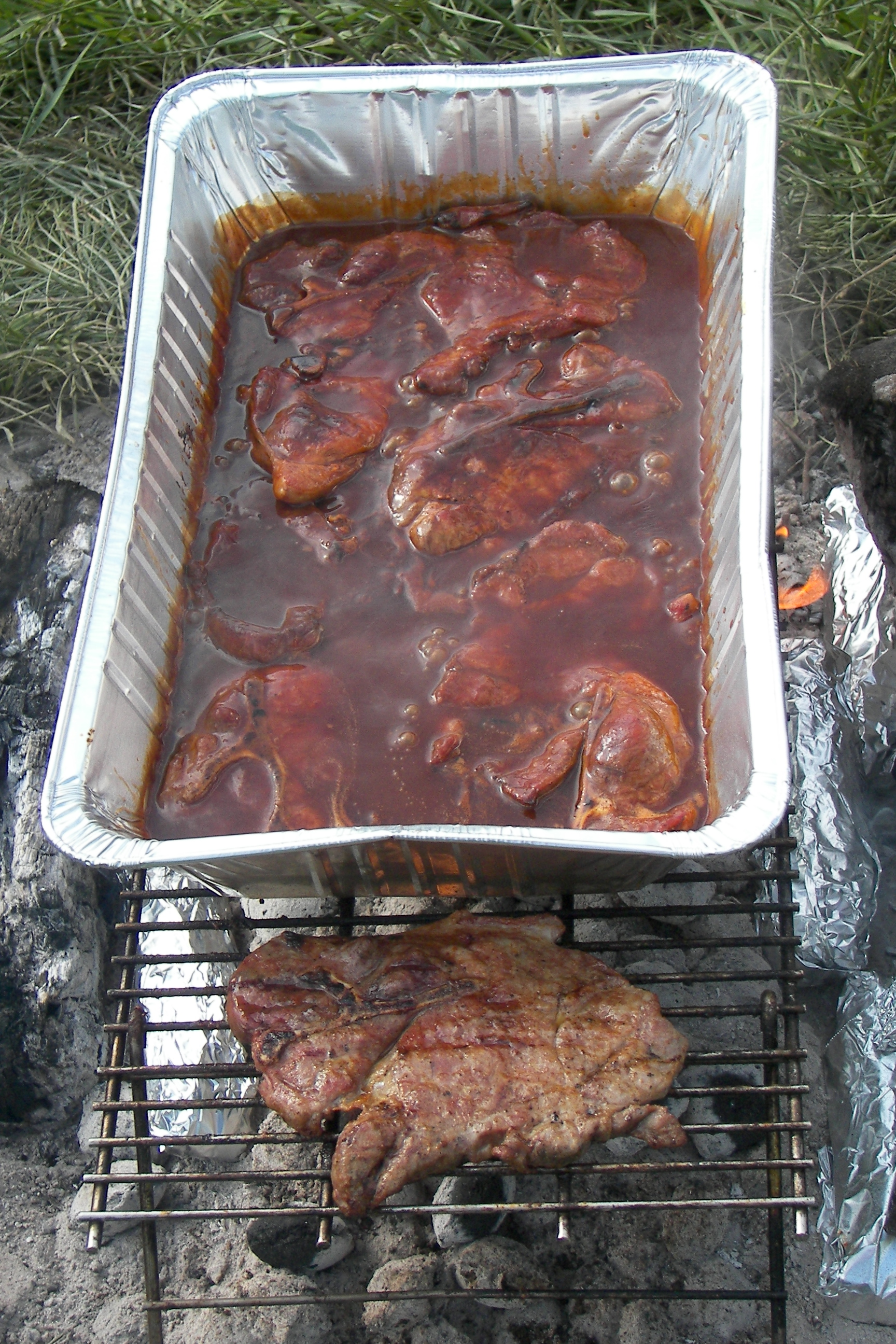
- St. Louis–style barbecue involves slow open grilling until done, then simmering in a pan of barbecue sauce placed on the grill.
- Type: Sauce
- Place of origin: United States
- Main ingredients: Vinegar, tomato paste, or ketchup
- Ingredients generally used: onion powder, spices such as black pepper, mayonnaise, and sugar or molasses

Barbecue sauce (also abbreviated as BBQ sauce) is a sauce used as a marinade, basting, or topping for meat cooked in the barbecue cooking style, including pork, beef, and chicken. It is a ubiquitous condiment in the Southern United States and Australia which is used on many other foods as well.

Ingredients vary depending on area, but most include vinegar or tomato paste (or a combination) as a base, as well as a combination of onion powder, spices such as mustard and black pepper, and sweeteners such as sugar or molasses.

== History ==
Some place the origin of barbecue sauce at the formation of the first American colonies in the 17th century. References to the sauce start occurring in both English and French literature over the next two hundred years. South Carolina mustard sauce, a type of barbecue sauce, can be traced to German settlers in the 18th century.

Early homemade barbecue sauces were made with vinegar, salt, and pepper. Sugar, ketchup, and Worcestershire sauce started to be used in the 1920s, but after World War II, the quantity of sugar and the number of ingredients increased dramatically.

The Georgia Barbecue Sauce Company of Atlanta advertised an early commercially produced barbecue sauce in 1909. Heinz was the first major company to sell bottled barbecue sauce in 1940. Wass Food Products of Chicago introduced vinegar-based Open Pit barbecue sauce in 1953; it became very popular in the Midwestern U.S. and was sold to General Foods in 1959. Kraft Foods only entered the market in around 1960, but with heavy advertising, succeeded in becoming the market leader. Kraft also started making cooking oils with bags of spice attached, supplying another market entrance of barbecue sauce.

== Variations ==
Different geographical regions have allegiances to their particular styles and variations of barbecue sauce.

=== East Carolina ===
Most American barbecue sauces can trace their roots to a sauce common in the eastern regions of North Carolina and South Carolina. The simplest and the earliest, it was popularized by enslaved Africans who also advanced the development of American barbecue, and originally was made with vinegar, ground black pepper, and hot chili pepper flakes. It is used as a "mopping" sauce to baste the meat while it is cooking and as a dipping sauce when it is served. "Thin, spicy, and vinegar based," it penetrates the meat and cuts the fats in the mouth, with a noticeably tarter flavor than most other barbecue sauces.

=== Western Carolina ===
In Lexington and the Piedmont areas of western North Carolina, the sauce is often called a dip. It is similar to the East Carolina sauce with the addition of tomato paste, tomato sauce, or ketchup.

=== South Carolina mustard sauce ===
Part of South Carolina is known for its yellow barbecue sauces made primarily of yellow mustard, vinegar, sugar, and spices. This sauce is most common in a belt from Columbia to Charleston.

=== Memphis ===
Similar to the Western Carolina style, but using molasses as a sweetener and with additional spices. It is usually served as a dipping sauce, as Memphis-style barbecue is typically a dry rub.

=== Kansas City ===
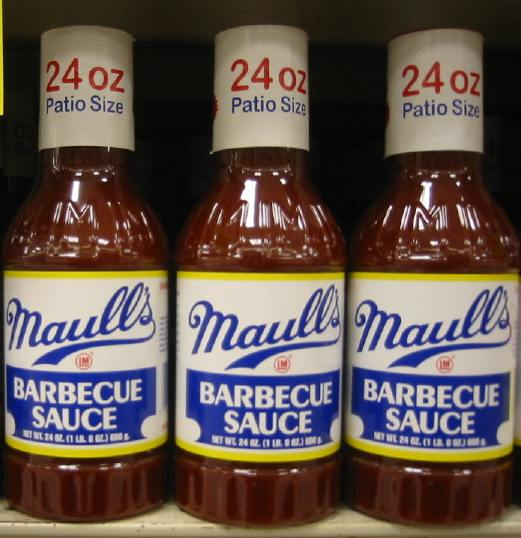
Bottles of Maull's barbecue sauce, a commercial St. Louis–style barbecue sauce

Thick, reddish-brown, tomato-based, and made with sugar, vinegar, and spices. It evolved from the Western Carolina– and Memphis-style sauces but is thicker and sweeter and does not penetrate the meat as much as it sits on the surface.

Typical commercial barbecue sauce is based on the Kansas City style.

=== Texas ===
In some of the older, more traditional restaurants, the sauces are heavily seasoned with cumin, chili peppers or chili powder, black pepper, and fresh onion, while using less tomato and sugar. They are medium thick and often resemble a thin tomato soup. They penetrate the meat easily rather than sit on top. Bottled barbecue sauces from Texas are often different from those used in the same restaurants because they do not contain meat drippings.

=== Alabama white sauce ===
North Alabama is known for its distinctive white sauce, a mayonnaise-based sauce that also includes apple cider vinegar, sugar, salt, and black pepper, which is used predominantly on chicken and pork.

== Brands and types of barbecue sauce ==
- Ah-So
- Bull's-Eye Barbecue Sauce
- Carolina Gold BBQ Sauce
- HP BBQ Sauce
- Hunt's
- KC Masterpiece
- Kraft
- Maull's barbecue sauce
- Reggae Reggae Sauce
- Sauer's Barbecue Sauce
- Shacha sauce
- Siu haau sauce
- Sweet Baby Ray's

Other sauces sometimes used for barbeque include mojo, mumbo sauce, and satay sauce.

== See also ==
- Barbacoa
- Brown sauce
- Ketchup
- List of barbecue dishes
- Dip (food) § List of common dips
- List of sauces
- Marination
- Red sauce
- Regional variations of barbecue
- Steak sauce
- Another Sauce
