= Maull's barbecue sauce =

Brand of barbecue sauce

An extra large bottle of Maull's barbecue sauce

Maull's barbecue sauce is a popular barbecue sauce in St. Louis, Missouri and is a common ingredient in preparing St. Louis–style barbecue. It is a rich and pungent, spicy semi-sweet, tomato based sauce, somewhat unusual for containing anchovies and pepper pulp. Maull's makes eight varieties of sauce now: Genuine, Sweet-N-Mild, Sweet-N-Smokey, Onion Bits, Beer Flavor, Smokey, Jalapeño, and a Kansas City–style barbecue sauce.

== History of the company ==
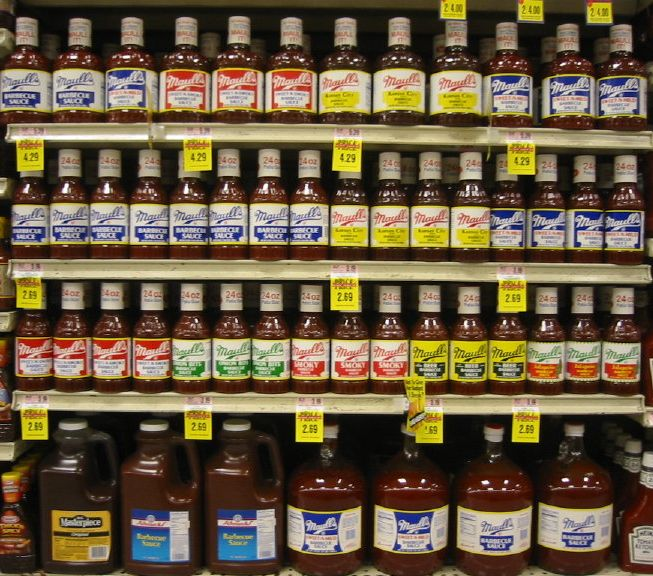
Common large shelf display of Maull's BBQ sauces at a St. Louis grocery store

The Louis Maull company started in 1897 as a grocery business selling out of a horse-drawn wagon. In 1905 it was incorporated as the Louis Maull Cheese and Fish company and had switched to wholesale distributing to restaurants and grocery stores. Starting in 1920 they were selling a line of condiments. Only by 1926 did they create a barbecue sauce recipe. It eventually became their most popular product, and they eliminated their other interests to focus solely on its manufacture and distribution. The company remains a family owned business in St. Louis.

An advertising slogan that could be heard on radio and television in the 1970s and 1980s was "Don't baste your barbecue, You Gotta Maull it!"

Maull's Barbeque Sauce quit filling orders January 9, 2018 per website.

Maull's Barbeque Sauce once again became available in St. Louis, MO grocery stores in July 2018.

== See also ==
- St. Louis-style barbecue
- Barbecue sauce
- Basting (cooking)
