= Andrew Zimmern's Bizarre World =

- Genre: Food/Travel
- Starring: Andrew Zimmern
- Country of origin: United States
- No. of seasons: 1

Production
- Executive producer: Colleen Needles Steward
- Editors: Troy D. Heller, Erik J. Fremstad
- Running time: 43:30

Original release
- Network: Travel Channel
- Release: September 1, 2009

Bizarre World is the follow-up to the successful Bizarre Foods. The show encompasses not only the classic bizarre foods of the world but also the unique cultures of the world. The new show appears to have been dropped in favor of new episodes of Bizarre Foods, which began in April 2010. The official website link redirects to the Bizarre Foods page on the Travel Channel website.
