= Sweet Baby Ray's =

Barbecue sauce brand

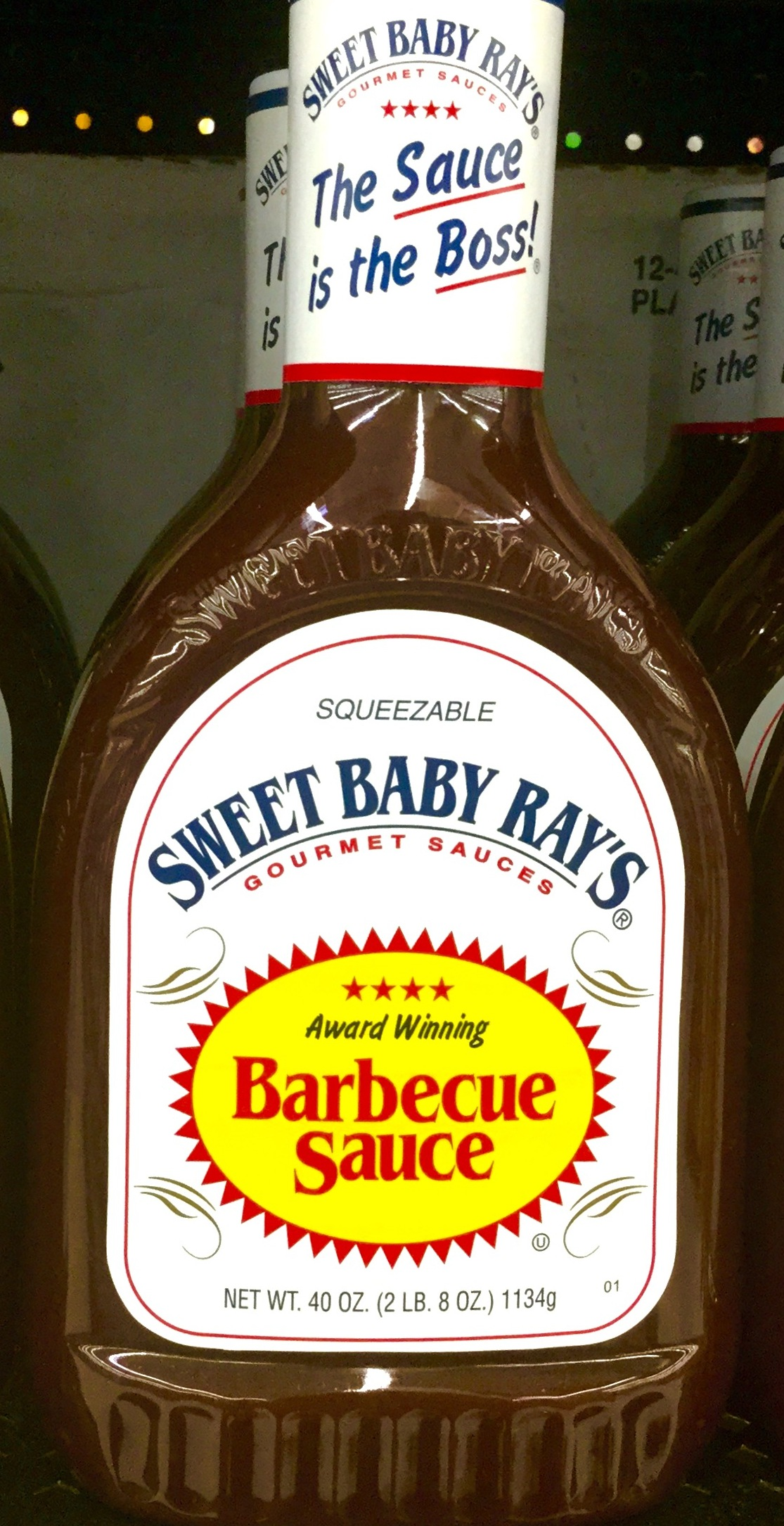
- Product type: Barbecue sauce
- Current owner: Ken’s Foods
- Country: United States
- Introduced: August 1986; 40 years ago
- Previous owners: Dave and Larry Raymond
- Tagline: The Sauce is the Boss!
- Website: sweetbabyrays.com

Sweet Baby Ray's is a brand of barbecue sauce based in Romeoville, Illinois.

== History ==
Sweet Baby Ray's barbecue sauce was developed in the early 1980s by Chicago brothers Dave and Larry Raymond. They named the sauce after a nickname Dave had earned as a basketball player. In 1982, the brothers entered their sauce in a Chicago barbecue competition for the first time. In 1985, their fourth year of competition, Sweet Baby Ray's won second place out of a field of 700 competitors. The following year, the brothers incorporated as a business and began selling the sauce to consumers.

The Raymonds sold the business in 2005 to Ken's Foods for $30 million. At the time, the brand was earning $30 million in revenue and had 21% total US market share. By 2008, the sauce had become the second best-selling barbecue sauce in the United States.

Despite selling the sauce business, Dave Raymond retained the rights to the name "Sweet Baby Ray's", and currently operates two restaurants under the name located in Chicago.

After an interview with Mark Zuckerberg in 2021, where a bottle of Sweet Baby Ray's sauce was seen in the background, media mentions of the brand name were worth $2 million.

Currently, there are 26 varieties of Sweet Baby Ray's sauces. They range from sweet to spicy, and even branch into other varieties, such as honey mustard and buffalo sauce. In 2020, the brand released a no sugar added line of sauces, which was expanded in 2021.

In March 2022, Mashed released the results of a survey of 695 people. Over 48% of them ranked Sweet Baby Ray's as their favorite barbecue sauce. The sauce that was ranked second in the survey was selected by just over 15% of the respondents.
