= Trøllanes =

- Village
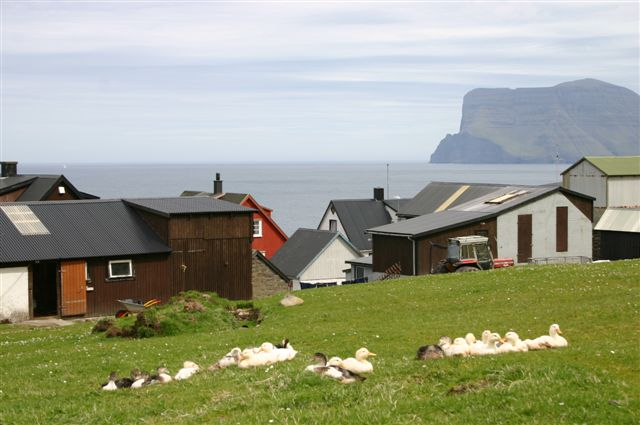
- Trøllanes

- Location in the Faroe Islands
- Coordinates: 62°21′43″N 6°47′18″W
- State: Kingdom of Denmark
- Constituent country: Faroe Islands
- Island: Kalsoy
- Municipality: Klaksvík

Population (1 November 2020)
  - Total: 13
- Time zone: GMT
  - Summer (DST): UTC+1 (EST)
- Postal code: FO 798
- Climate: Cfc

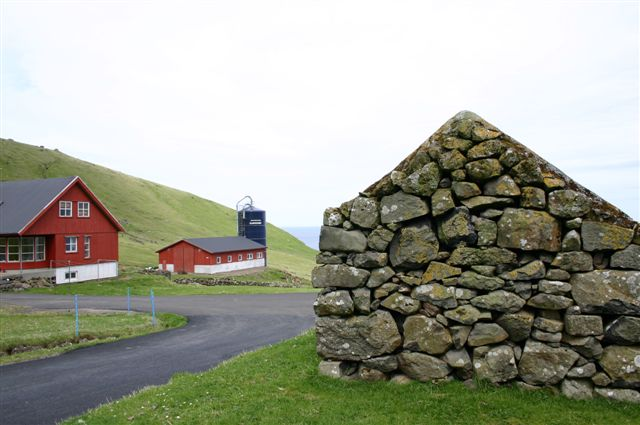

Trøllanes (Danish: Troldenæs) is a village at the northern end of the Faroese island of Kalsoy in the municipality of Klaksvík.

Its postal code is FO 798. A tunnel to the village of Mikladalur to the south, the Trøllanestunnilin, was completed in 1985. Trøllanes is noted for its meat specialty, Garnatálg, made by kneading sheep fat.

Trøllanes and Mikladalur formerly constituted the commune of Mikladalur, before being incorporated into Klaksvík.

The name of the village means 'Troll peninsula'. The village name Origin story is that in the old days, the village was visited every Twelfth Night, by trolls from the surrounding mountains, and the villagers had to flee and seek shelter for the night in the neighbouring village of Mikladalur. And it is this which has given the village its name. One year on Twelfth Night however, there was an old woman, who wasn't able to make the trip to the next village due to infirmity, and she hid under the table in the living room, when the trolls came. They danced and partied and made such a noise that the old woman, in fear called out the name of Christ. When the trolls heard the holy name, they stopped partying and cursed the old woman, and left the village, and have never bothered it again. When the villagers returned they expected to find the old lady dead, but she was alive and able to tell them about the night's events.

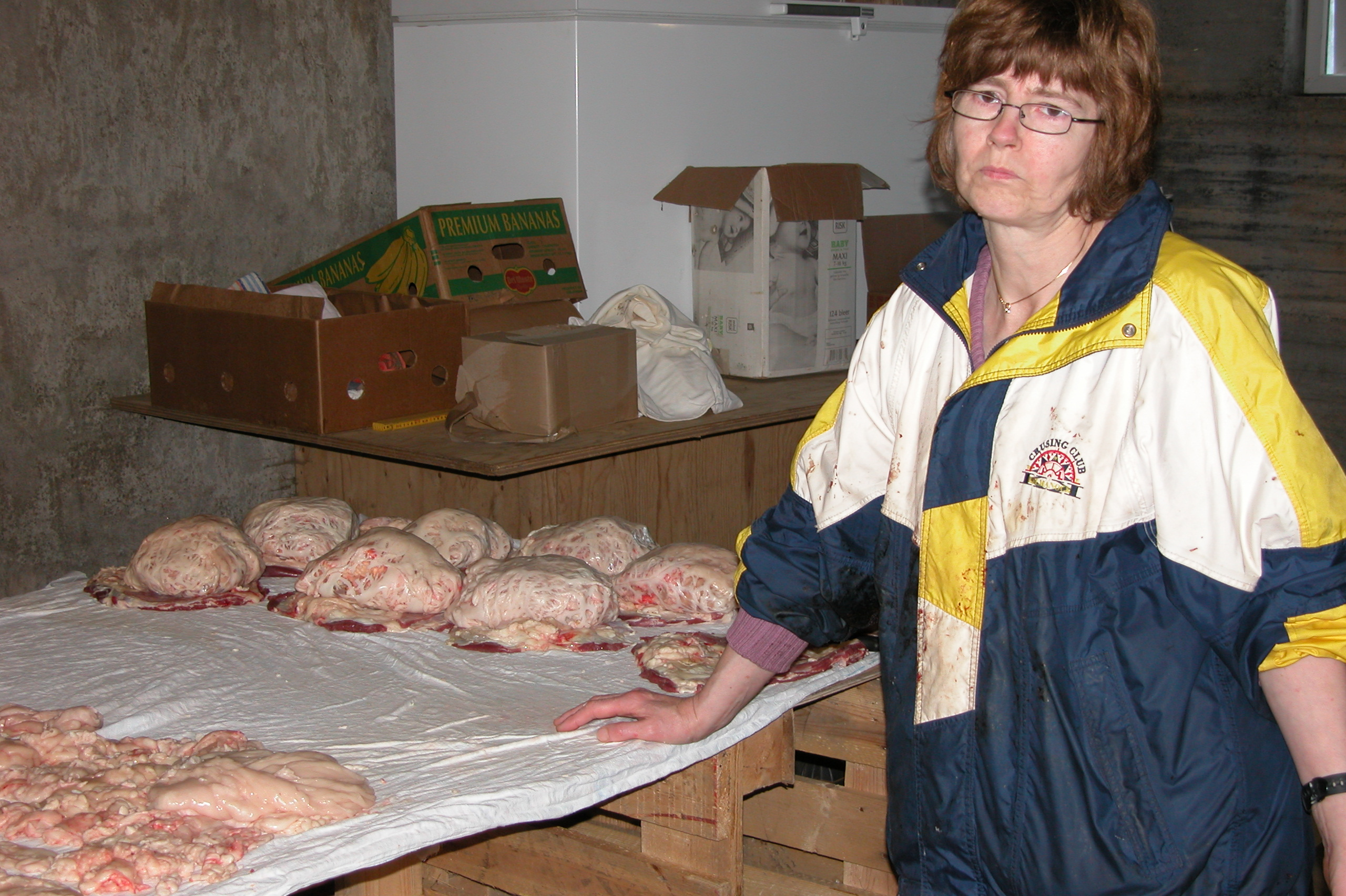
A local preparing a specialty of the village, Garnatálg

== See also ==
- List of towns in the Faroe Islands
