= Khlea =

Type of preserved meat

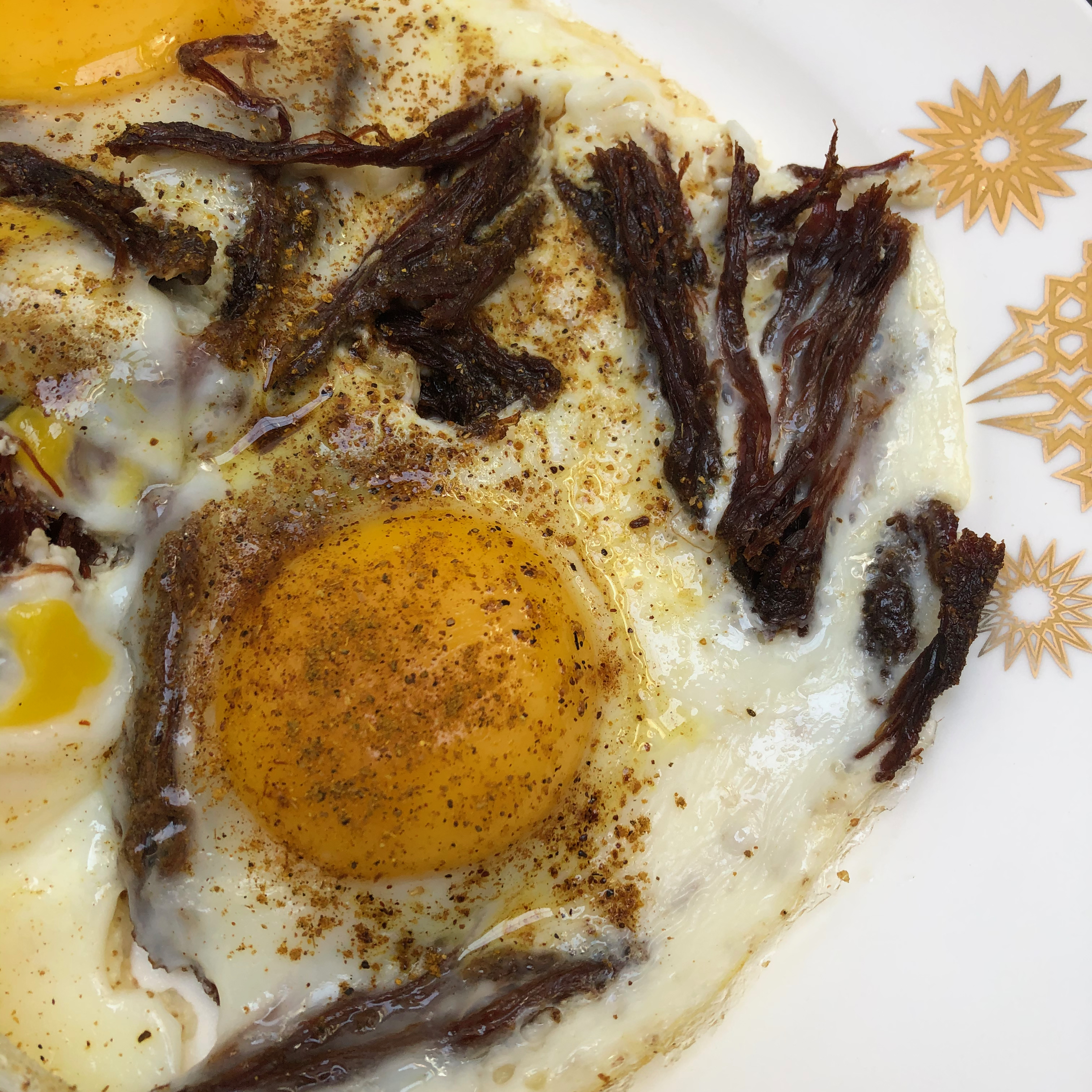
Eggs with khlīʿ and cumin

Khlea or khlii (Arabic: الخليع) is a preserved meat, usually made with beef or lamb, originating from Morocco.

Khlea is made by cutting meat into strips and letting it dry in the sun after marinating it in garlic, coriander and cumin. The meat is cooked in a mixture of water, oil and animal fat. In some cases, the dish uses camel meat prepared in a mixture of fat from the camel's hump and kidneys. Upon cooling, the meat is submerged in more animal fat and left to dry. Khlea can be preserved for up to two years at room temperature.
