= Andrew Zimmern =

American chef (born 1961)

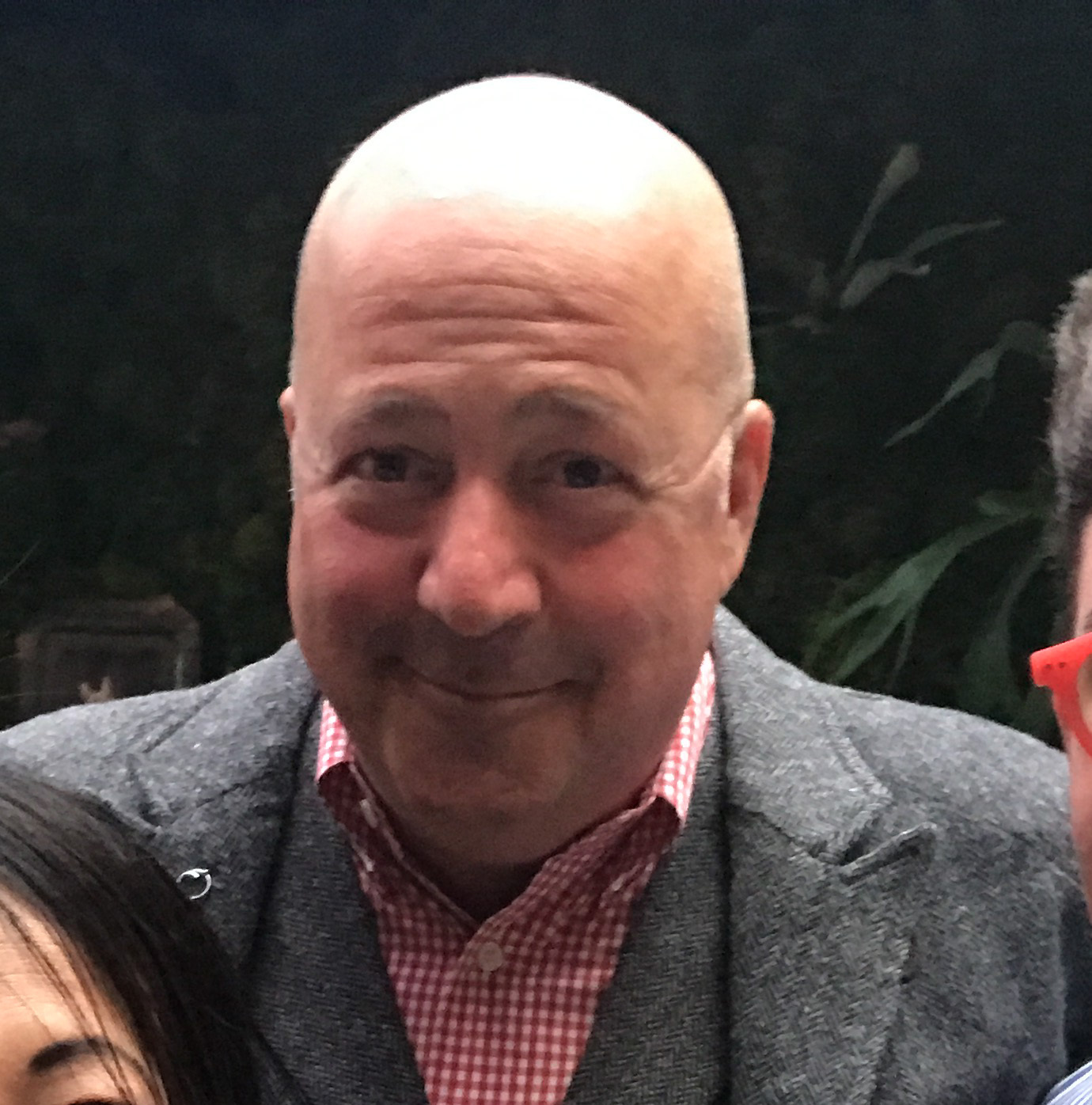
- Zimmern in 2017
- Born: July 4, 1961 (age 65); New York City, U.S.
- Education: The Dalton School; Vassar College (BA)
- Occupations: Chef, restaurateur, TV and radio personality, food critic, director, producer, columnist
- Years active: 1975–present
- Spouse: Rishia Haas (m. 2002; div. 2020)
- Children: 1

Andrew Scott Zimmern (born July 4, 1961) is an American chef, restaurateur, television and radio personality, director, producer, businessman, food critic, and author.

Zimmern is the co-creator, host, and consulting producer of the Travel Channel television series Bizarre Foods with Andrew Zimmern, Bizarre Foods America, Bizarre Foods: Delicious Destinations, Andrew Zimmern's Bizarre World, Dining with Death, The Zimmern List, and Andrew Zimmern's Driven by Food, as well as the Food Network series The Big Food Truck Tip. Zimmern hosts a cooking webseries on YouTube, Andrew Zimmern Cooks. Another show, What's Eating America, premiered on MSNBC in 2020. He is the co-author of The Blue Food Cookbook: Delicious Seafood Recipes for a Sustainable Future (released in 2025).

For his work on Bizarre Foods with Andrew Zimmern, he was presented the James Beard Foundation Award four times: in 2010, 2012, 2013, and 2017, and he is an Emmy-winning television personality. He also serves as a Global Goodwill Ambassador for the United Nations World Food Programme, and is an advocate for global food system sustainability.

== Early and personal life ==
Zimmern was born in 1961 to Caren and Robert Zimmern, who worked in advertising, and raised on the Upper East Side in New York City in a Jewish family.

As a boy, he attended James Beard's Christmas and Sunday open houses with his father and father's male partner. He credits Beard's hospitality for his early culinary aspirations.

Zimmern attended the Dalton School in New York City, and later graduated from Vassar College in 1984 with a BA in History and Art History. He worked at several fine dining restaurants in New York as either executive chef or general manager. He has also lectured on restaurant management and design at The New School for Social Research.

Owing to severe drug and alcohol addiction, Zimmern was homeless for about one year, in 1990-91. During this period, he survived by stealing purses from cafes and selling the contents. In 1992, Zimmern moved to Minnesota, where he checked into the Hazelden Treatment Center for drug and alcohol addiction treatment, where he now volunteers. He currently resides in Minneapolis.

Zimmern later gained wide acclaim from 1992 to 1997 during his four-and-a-half-year tenure as executive chef of Café Un Deux Trois in Minneapolis's Foshay Tower. His menus received the highest ratings from the St. Paul Pioneer Press, Minneapolis Star Tribune, Minnesota Monthly, and Mpls. St. Paul Magazine, as well as national publications. Following his success in the Twin Cities, Zimmern left his position as executive chef at Café Un Deux Trois in 1998 to pursue new opportunities. In 2018, Zimmern opened a Chinese restaurant, Lucky Cricket, in St. Louis Park, Minnesota. The restaurant initially struggled, closed for a re-model, later re-opened, and closed again permanently during the 2020 pandemic.

Zimmern was married to Rishia Haas from 2002 to 2018, with the divorce finalized in 2020. They have one son, Noah, who was born in 2005.

== Writing and food events ==
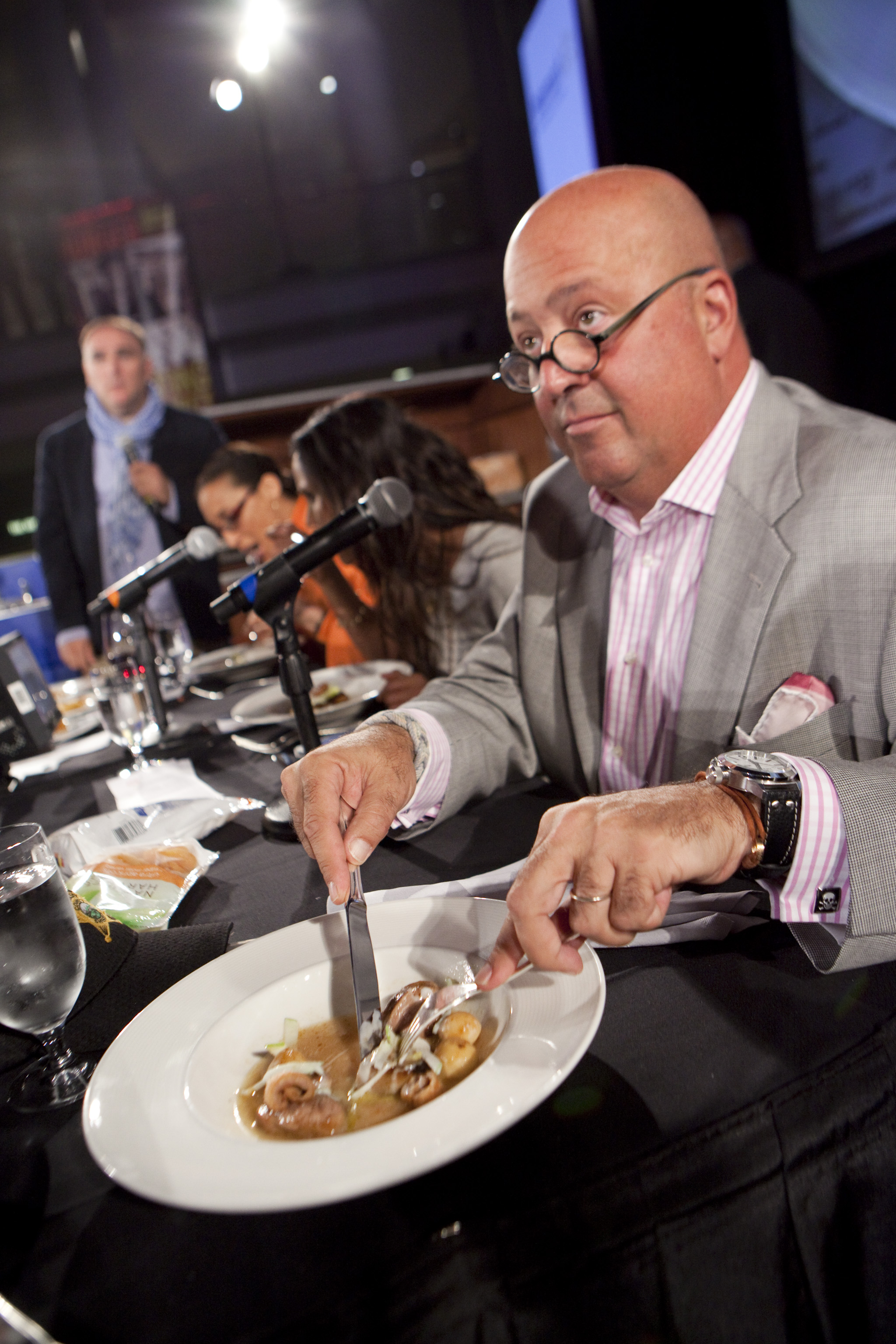
Zimmern judging the 2012 Capital Food Fight, a fundraiser for DC Central Kitchen

Zimmern is a contributing editor and award-winning monthly columnist at Mpls. St. Paul Magazine and a senior editor at Delta Sky Magazine. As a freelance journalist, his work has appeared in numerous national and international publications. Zimmern has served as SuperTarget's meal adventure guide, sharing his passion for ethnic foods with supermarket customers around the country. He is the international spokesman for Travel Leaders and Elite Destination Homes.

Prior to Bizarre Foods, Zimmern had an extensive radio career. His shows Chowhounds, The Andrew Zimmern Show, and Food Court With Andrew Zimmern achieved wide popularity in the Twin Cities.

Zimmern was the food features reporter for Fox TV station KMSP-TV and was also a featured contributor on both HGTV's Rebecca's Garden and Tip-ical Mary Ellen, where he handled on-air food duties for both shows. He was the food and lifestyle features reporter during the 1997 season of the UPN network's nationally televised Everyday Living.

Zimmern has been a guest chef at many national charity events, food festivals, and galas, including Food and Wine Magazine's Aspen Festival, the Twin Cities Food and Wine Experience, and the James Beard House in New York City. He has appeared frequently on the Food Network's Best Of..., CNN's Money and Health, and NBC's Today Show. He also starred in the Cooking Club of America's instructional video series.

Zimmern regularly speaks to professional associations around the globe on all culinary matters, from the American Federation of Chefs to the Chinese Chefs National Committee. In the fall of 2002, he was an honored guest of the People's Republic of China, traveling, lecturing, and giving demonstrations on Chinese cuisine.

Zimmern's book The Bizarre Truth: How I Walked out the Door Mouth First ... and Came Back Shaking My Head was published by Broadway Books in 2009. It is a collection of his food and travel stories from around the world. He is also the author of Andrew Zimmern's Field Guide to Exceptionally Weird, Wild, and Wonderful Foods, released by Feiwel & Friends on October 30, 2012. His latest book is a grade-level reader series called Alliance of World Explorers, Volume 1: AZ and the Lost City of Ophir and was released in February 2019. This book won the 2019 Gold IPPY in Juvenile Fiction.

Zimmern also lends his name to a stand named Andrew Zimmern's Canteen at Target Field and U.S. Bank Stadium in Minneapolis, Minnesota.

== Travel Channel ==
Bizarre Foods with Andrew Zimmern premiered on the Travel Channel with a pilot episode on November 1, 2006. The series has aired over 140 episodes, with Zimmern visiting dozens of countries and states. Bizarre Foods took home two CableFax awards in 2009, one for Best Television Program: Food, another for Best Online Extras for Andrew's web series Bizarre Foods in the Kitchen.

In 2009, Zimmern hosted a spinoff of Bizarre Foods called Andrew Zimmern's Bizarre World. A pilot and nine episodes were produced in eight countries and two states.

Zimmern guest-starred in a 2007 episode of No Reservations with Anthony Bourdain in New York City; Bourdain did the same on Bizarre Foods. Zimmern also appeared in a 2009 episode of Man v. Food with Adam Richman in Minneapolis where he introduced Richman to lutefisk.

In January 2012, another spinoff of Bizarre Foods, called Bizarre Foods America, debuted. This time, Zimmern focused on various cities in the United States and sampled local cuisines and ways of life.

== Awards and recognition ==
In May 2010, Zimmern won the James Beard Award for Outstanding TV Food Personality. He won another James Beard Award in 2012, a third in 2013, and a fourth in 2017.

His online series, Toyota's Appetite for Life, won an Effie Award in 2010.

Zimmern is entrepreneur-in-residence at Babson College.

== See also ==
- James Beard Foundation Award: 2010s
