= Obanzai =

Traditional style of Japanese cuisine

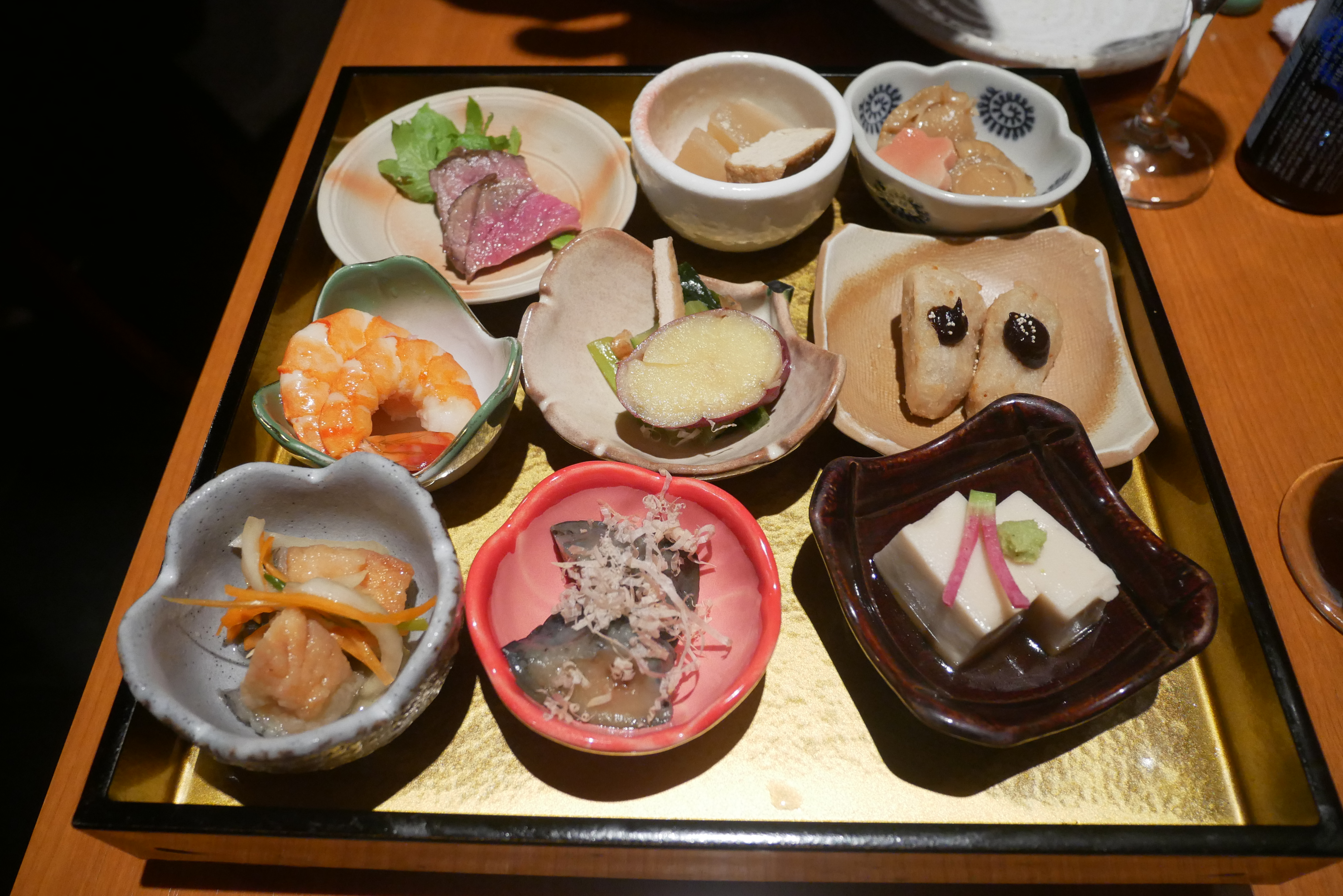
Obanzai in Kyoto, 2018

Obanzai (おばんざい) is a traditional style of Japanese cuisine native to Kyoto. For food to be considered obanzai, at least half of its ingredients must be produced or processed in Kyoto. Ingredients in obanzai cooking must also be in season. Obanzai cooking heavily relies on vegetables and seafood, prepared simply. Another characteristic of obanzai is the incorporation of ingredients which are usually discarded as waste.

== Origin ==
The word obanzai originated in 1964, when Shige Ōmura and others used the term in a newspaper article to describe traditional home cooking of Kyoto.

== Preparation ==
Traditionally, obanzai is made taking into consideration five core spiritual elements:

- honma mon ('genuine things') – using seasonings and cooking implements that have value
- ambai ('balance') – unique balance born out of flexibility and creativity in utilizing ingredients
- deaimon ('encounter') – cherishing encounters that are made through acquisition and use of ingredients. This word means the act or spirit of living with nature or community.
- omotenashi ('hospitality') – willingness to make an effort to make the best selection matching the mood or condition of others, to cogitate to enjoy the meal, to cook with the wish that who eat the meal stay healthy. These three acts means motenashi.
- shimatsu ('not creating waste') – similar to mottainai, it means putting everything available to good use
