= Mocochinchi =

Peach drink of Bolivia

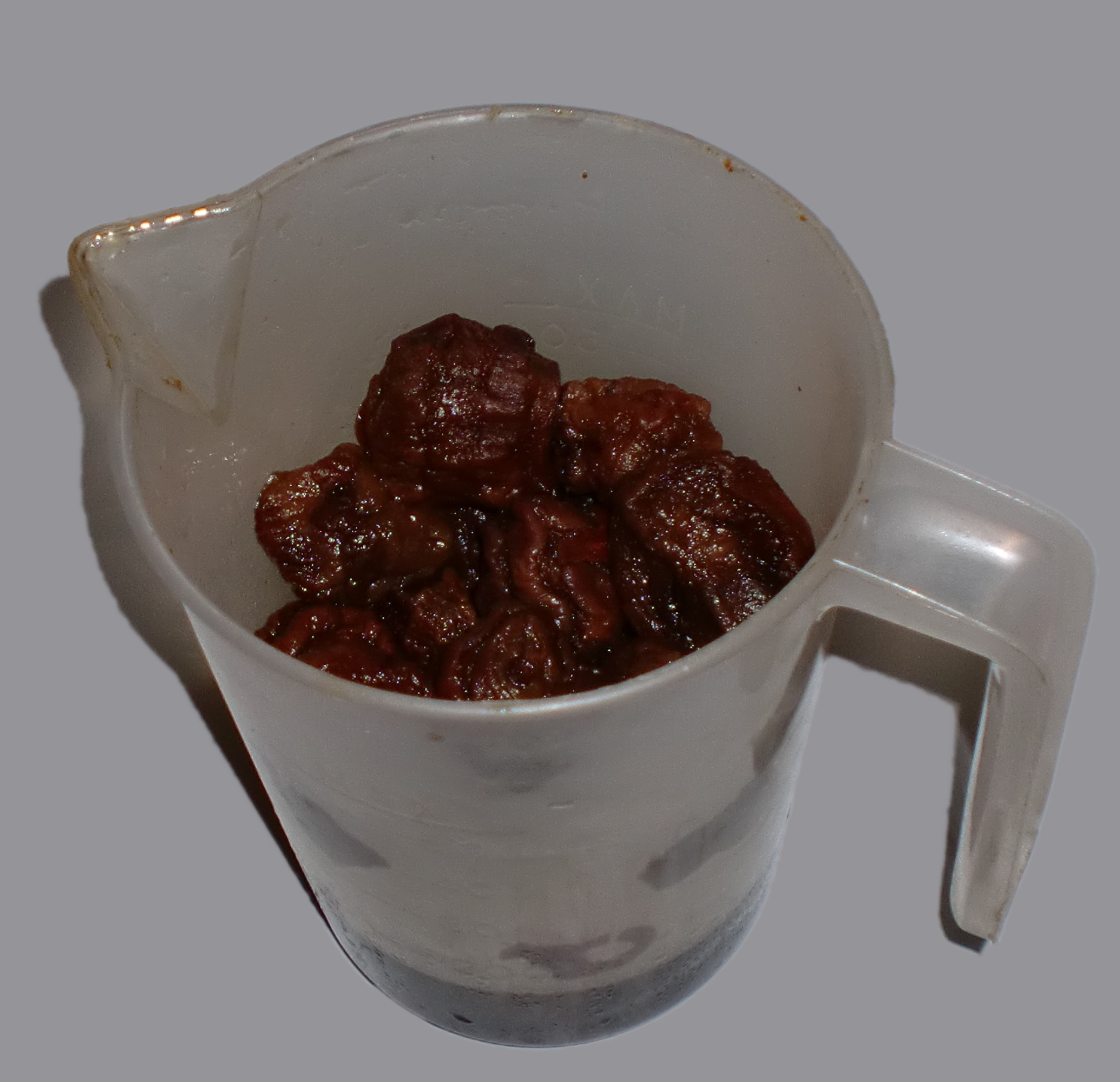
- Type: Bolivian cuisine
- Country of origin: Bolivia

Mocochinchi (from the Quechua for dried peach) is a Bolivian beverage. It is made with peaches that have been peeled and dried. The fruits are left in water overnight, then boiled with sugar and cinnamon. The drink is served cold, and often, after finishing the drink, the peach is eaten.

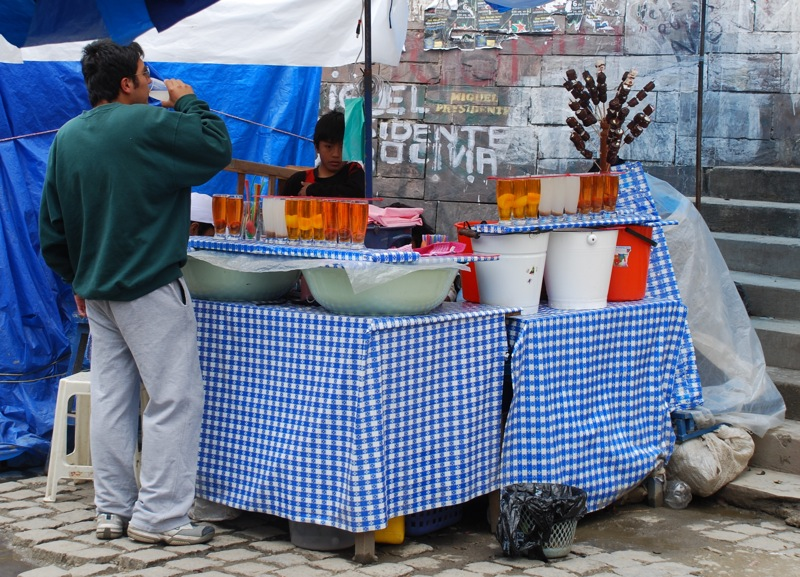
Drinking mocochinchi on a market in La Paz.

== See also ==
- Mote con huesillo

== Sources ==
- "La cocina boliviana, variedad y sabor" (in Spanish). Spain: Eroski. 3 August 2005.
