= Arroz a la tumbada =

Mexican rice dish

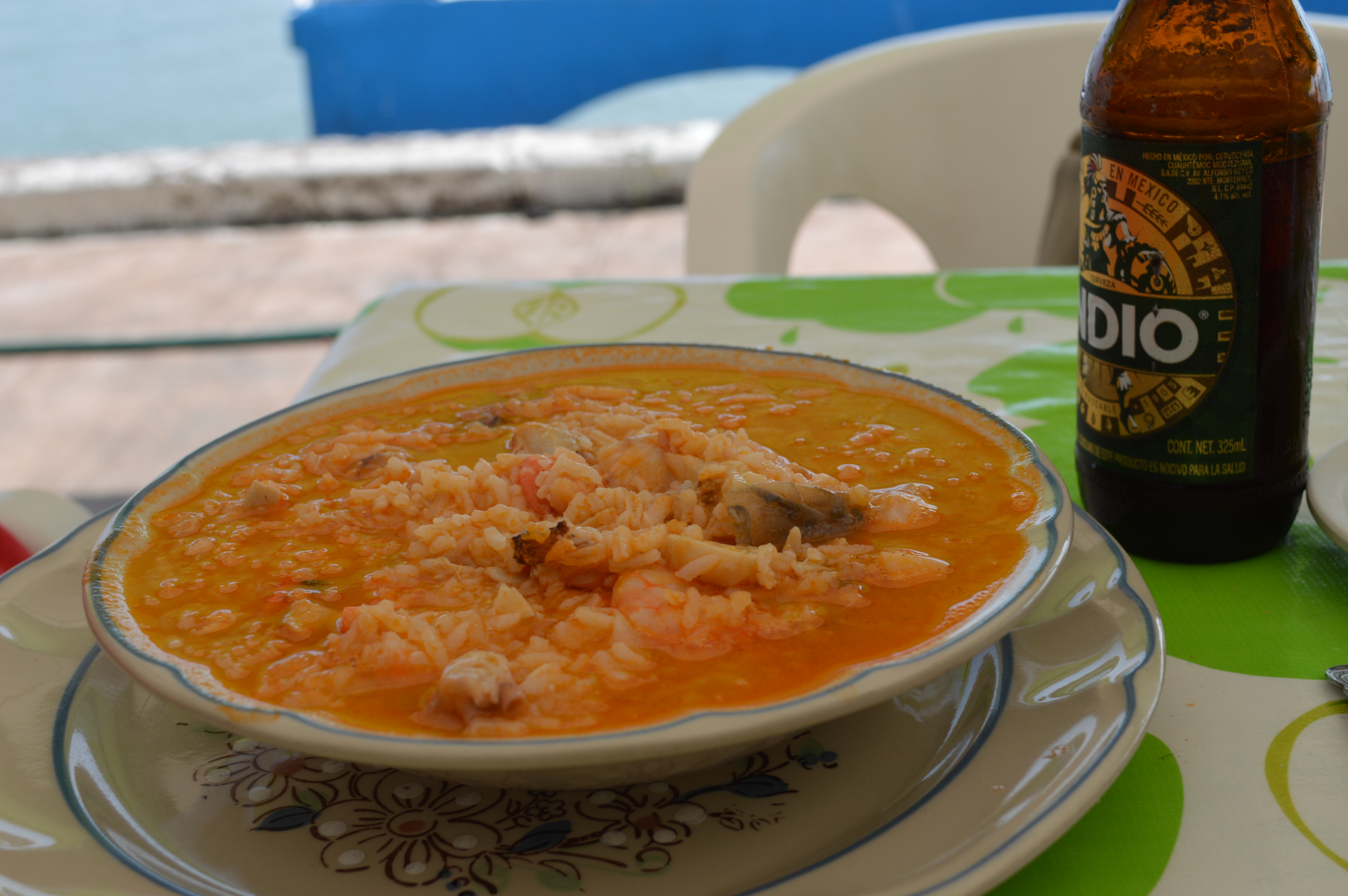
Arroz a la tumbada

Arroz a la tumbada is a traditional Mexican dish prepared with white rice and seafood. In this specialty a sofrito is made with chopped tomato, onion, garlic and red pepper. Rice and fish broth or water is added, then seafood which may include shrimp, clams, crab, calamari and whitefish. The dish may be seasoned with fresh leaves of epazote, parsley, coriander and oregano. Arroz a la tumbada is traditionally cooked in a cazuela, which is a thick clay pot.

== See also ==
- Arroz a la valenciana
- Jambalaya
- Paella
