= Red sauce =

Red sauce may refer to:

- Marinara sauce, in the United States
- Ketchup, Ireland
- Salsa roja, in Mexican cuisine
- Red curry, in Thai cuisine
