= Garnatálg =

Faroenese prepared sheep fat

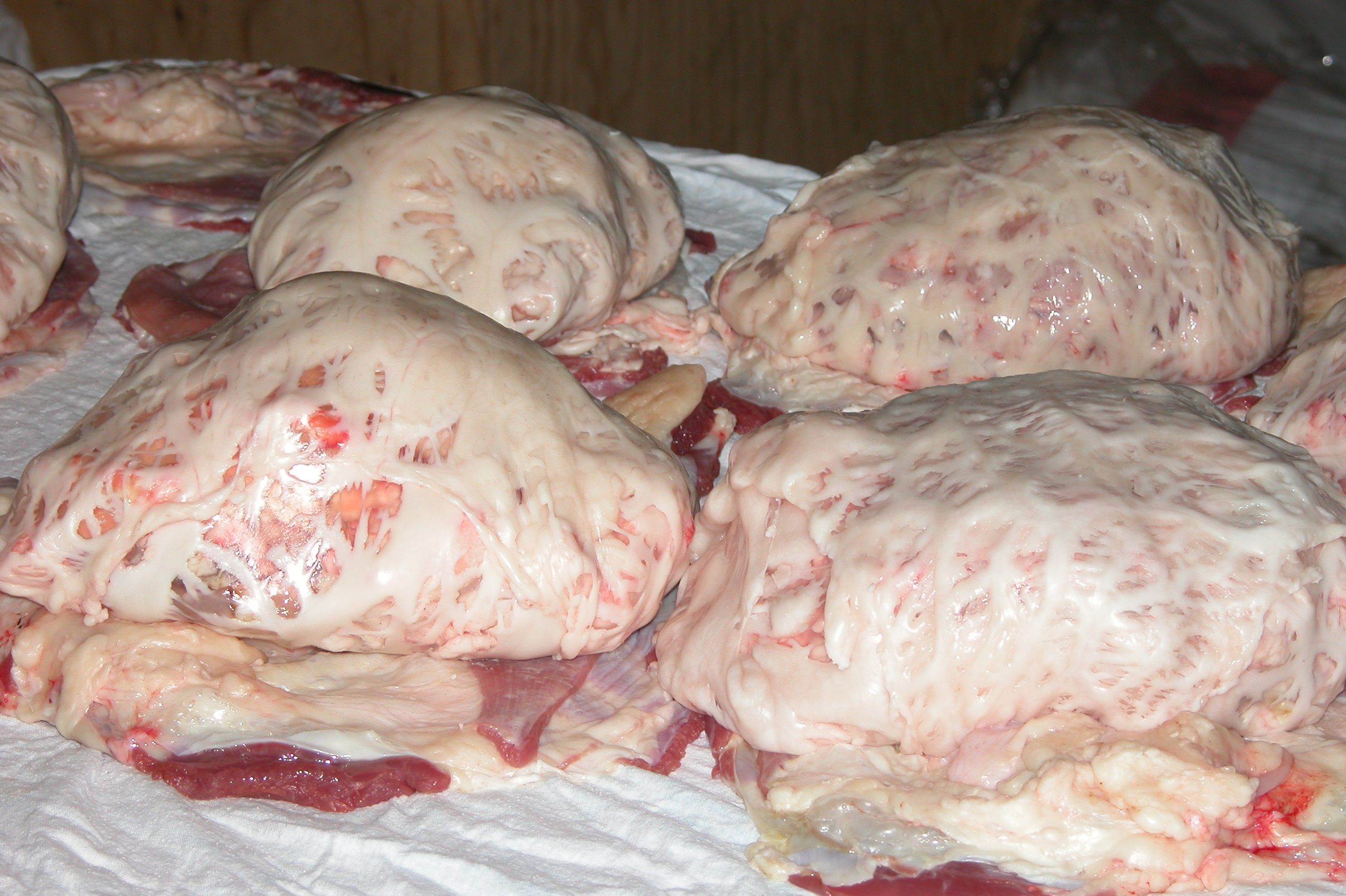

Garnatálg (Faroese for 'gut tallow') is a traditional dish from the Faroe Islands. It is made by kneading intestinal fat from sheep into lumps, which then get air dried in hjallur (outhouses where the wind can blow through) and fermented. Garnatálg is served sliced and melted, often as a sidedish for fish, particularly ræstur fiskur (fermented semidried fish). It can also be served over potatoes.

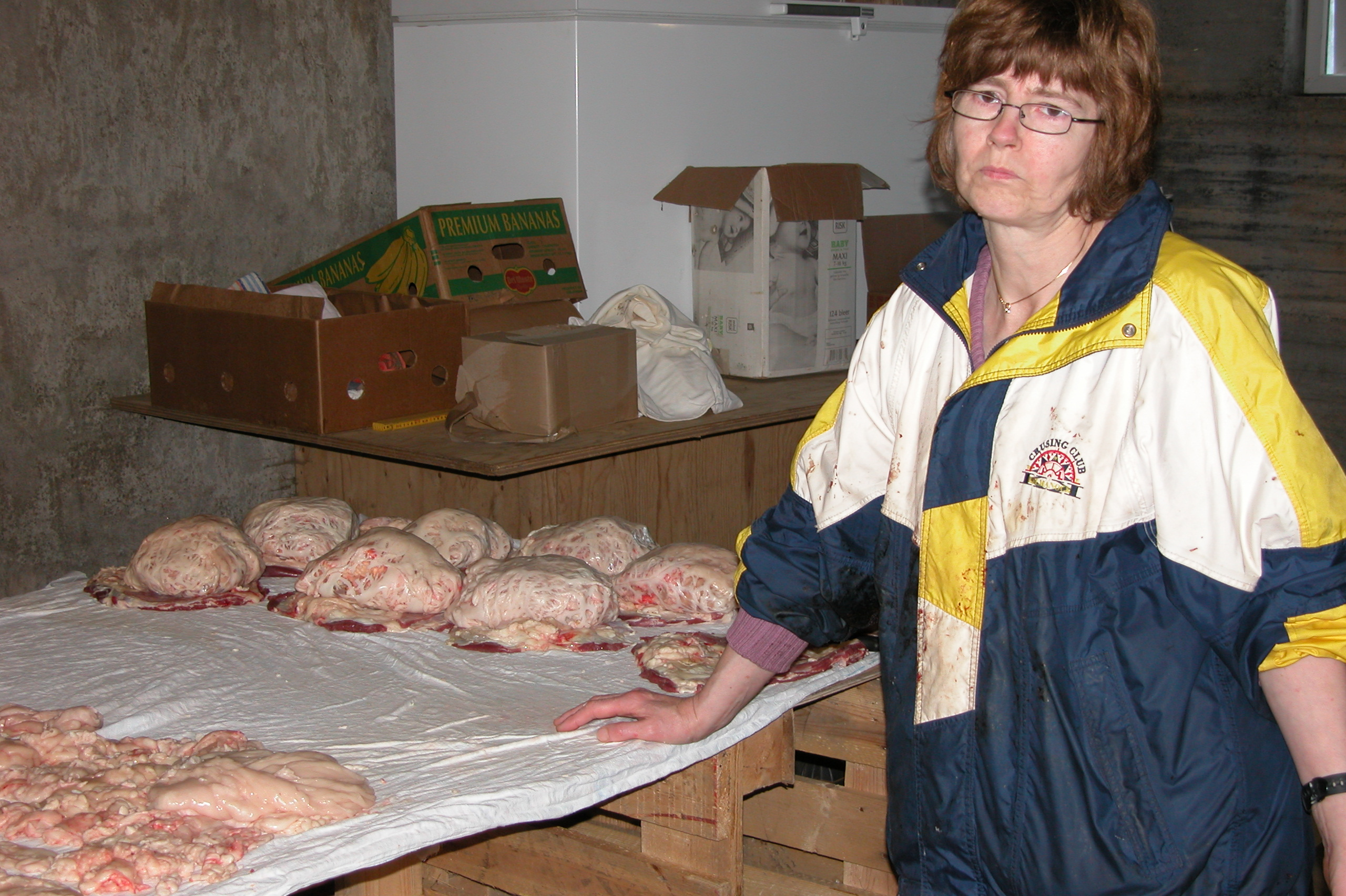
A local preparing garnatálg in the village of Trøllanes.
