= St. Louis–style barbecue =

Spare ribs dish

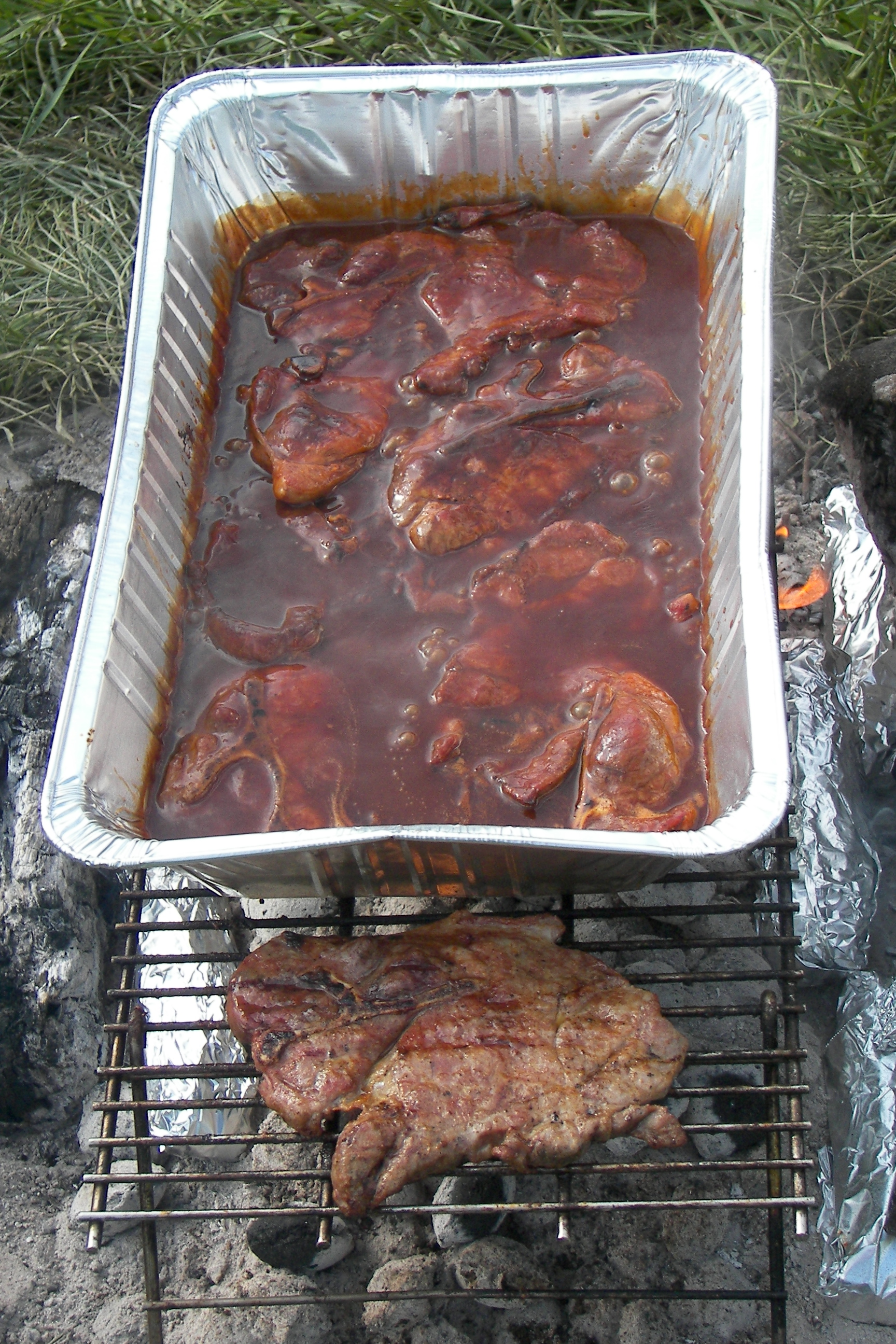
Pork steaks cooking

St. Louis–style barbecue refers to spare ribs associated with the St. Louis area. These are usually grilled rather than slow-cooked over indirect heat with smoke which is typically associated with the term "barbecue" in the United States. Although St. Louis–style barbecue takes inspiration from other styles of barbecue it still retains its own distinct style.

== Characteristics ==
St. Louis–style barbecue is characterized by its process of grilling and then saucing the meat. The cooking time for St. Louis–style barbecue is faster than other styles because it does not require smoking the meat for hours or applying a dry rub. St. Louis barbecue sauce is tomato-based, sweet, and vinegary. It traditionally contains ketchup, brown sugar, apple cider vinegar, salt, pepper, and other spices. Instead of baby back ribs, traditional St. Louis ribs have a specific cut called spare ribs. The typical St. Louis spare rib cut is rectangular or square-shaped to give the ribs more aesthetic appeal, while also cutting off more cartilage from the sides, causing them to be meatier. Popular cuts of meat that are typically used include: brisket and burnt ends, pork ribs, pork steak, rip tips, and snoots, which are pig noses and cheeks and are typically dehydrated or slow-grilled until crispy. White bread is a popular side addition to St. Louis–style barbecue, and is used to absorb the barbecue sauce.

== History ==
The ribs are often heavily sauced; St. Louis is said to consume more barbecue sauce per capita than any other city in the United States. St. Louis–style barbecue sauce is described by author Steven Raichlen as a "very sweet, slightly acidic, sticky, tomato-based barbecue sauce usually made without liquid smoke." St. Louis is said to be home to the first barbecue sauce in the country, which was created by Louis Maull in 1926. In the 1950s, pork butt became a staple in local St. Louis-Style barbecue when local grocery chain Schnucks began selling it.

St. Louis–style ribs have deep roots to Kansas City–style barbecue. Kansas City is often credited as developing a very distinct regional style of barbecue and because the two cities are physically close St. Louis barbecue has taken a lot of cues from Kansas City. Barbecue had long been a part of the cities' culture, but it began to have widespread popularity in the 1920s.

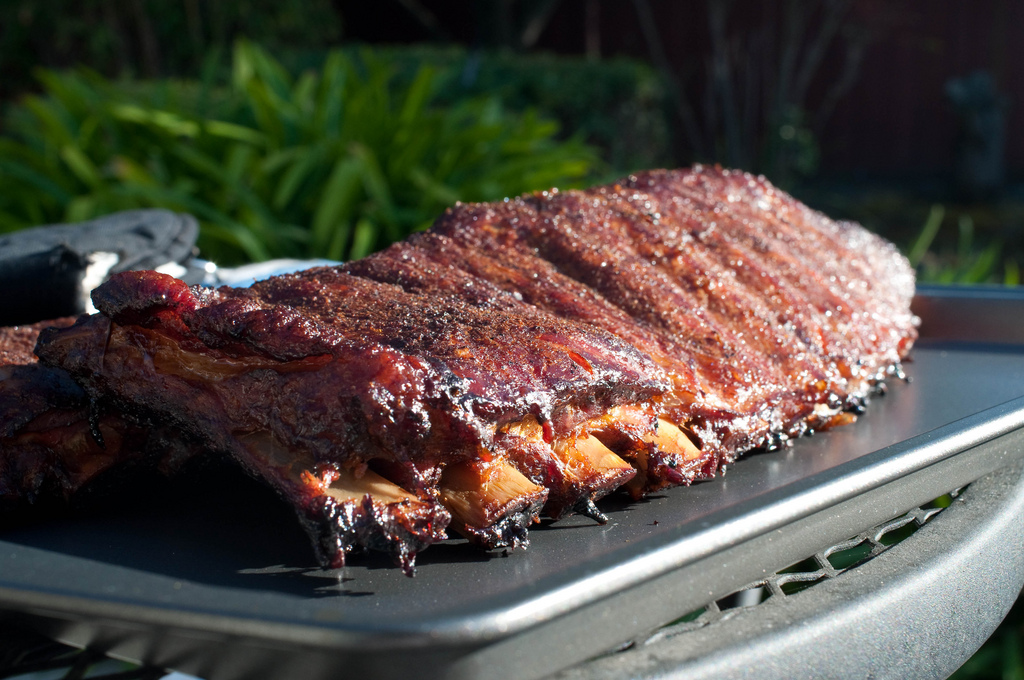
St. Louis ribs, ready to eat

St. Louis–style spare ribs are cut in a particular way with the sternum bone, cartilage and rib tips removed so that a well-formed, rectangular-shaped rack is created for presentation. This cut of ribs, formalized by the USDA as "Pork Ribs, St. Louis Style," allegedly originated with numerous meat-packing plants located in the region in the mid-20th century and put into the policy by a diehard fan of the St. Louis Cardinals baseball team. Butchers after World War 2 employed this cut because it eliminated much of the fat and gristle and they could charge a premium for it. This cutting technique eventually gained popularity as local meatpackers realized they could advertise the cut as St. Louis–style ribs and differentiate themselves from competitors.

== See also ==
- Cuisine of St. Louis
- Kansas City–style barbecue
- List of regional dishes of the United States
- Maull's barbecue sauce
- Sandwiches That You Will Like
- List of pork dishes

== Sources ==
- "The best BBQ in St. Louis". www.stlmag.com. 2021-01-01.
