= Cuisine of the Midwestern United States =

Regional cuisine of the United States

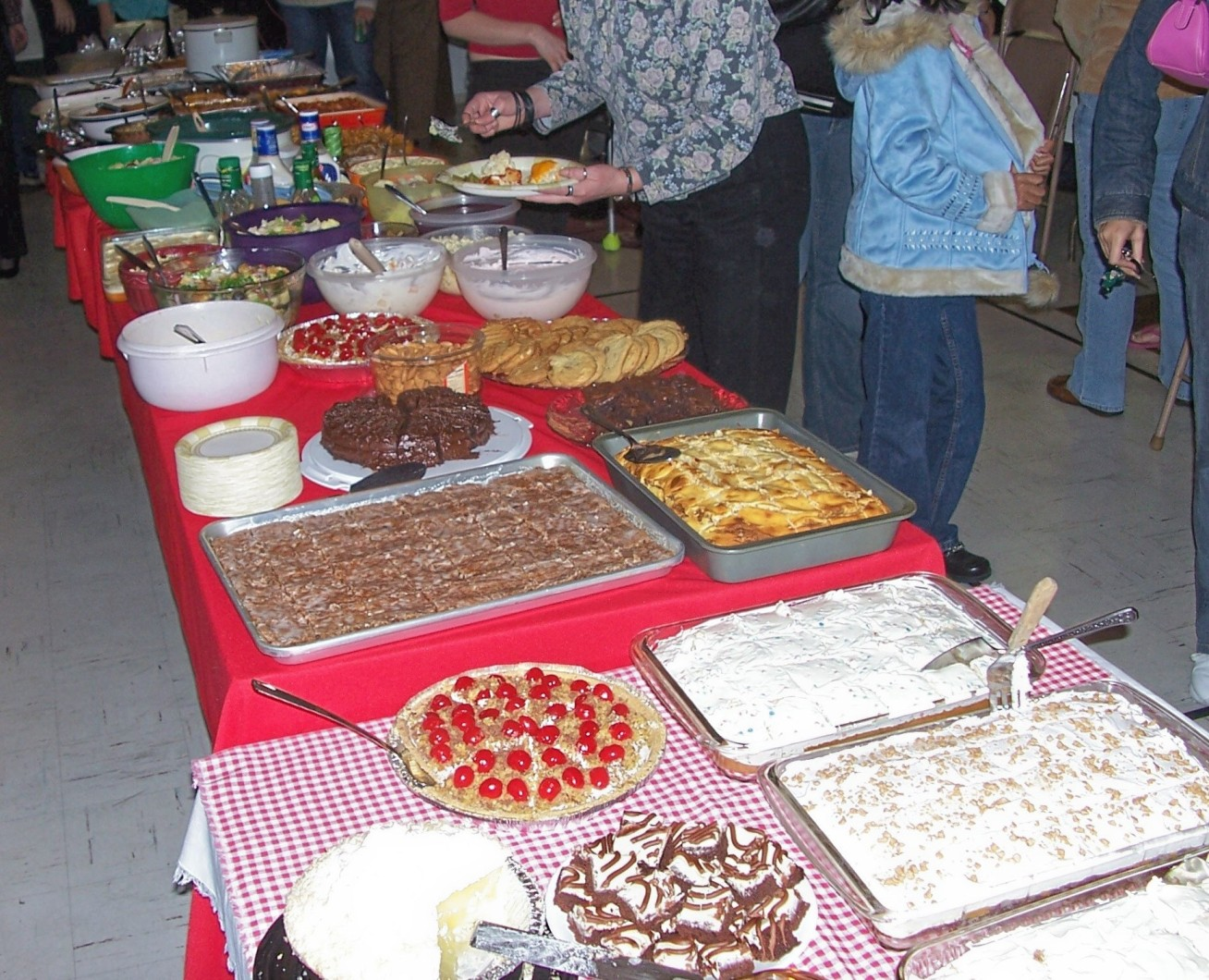
Minnesota potluck

The cuisine of the American Midwest draws its culinary roots most significantly from the cuisines of Central, Northern and Eastern Europe, and Indigenous cuisine of the Americas, and is influenced by regionally and locally grown foodstuffs and cultural diversity.

Everyday Midwestern home cooking generally showcases simple and hearty dishes that make use of the abundance of locally grown foods. It has been described as "no-frills homestead and farm food, exemplifying what is called typical American cuisine". Some Midwesterners bake their own bread and pies and preserve food by canning and freezing it.

== Background ==
Sometimes called "the breadbasket of America", the Midwest serves as a center for grain production, particularly wheat, corn, and soybeans.

Beef and pork processing have long been important Midwestern industries. Chicago and Kansas City served as stockyards and processing centers of the beef trade and Cincinnati, nicknamed "Porkopolis", was once the largest pork-producing city in the world. Iowa is the current center of pork production in the U.S.

Midwestern home cooking generally consists of simple dishes that make use of locally grown foods. The practice of canning and freezing summer foods is still done in modern times. Foods such as pies and bread may also be baked at home.

=== History ===
Seen highlighted in red, the region known as the Midwestern United States, as currently defined by the U.S. Census Bureau

Ohio was one of the first Midwestern regions settled, mostly by farmers from the Thirteen Colonies, in 1788. Maize was the staple food, eaten at every meal. Ohio was abundant in fish, game, and wild fruits. The settlers learned techniques of making venison jerky from Native Americans. They grew pumpkins, beans, potatoes, and corn, and raised hogs. Apples, wheat, and oats were introduced later.

Swedes, Norwegians, and Finns began to settle the Midwest in the late 18th century, introducing rich, butter-laden cakes and cookies. In addition to making cheese and butter, German and Swiss dairy farmers raised milk-fed veal and produced a type of white beer called weisse bier. Germans brought dishes like Hassenpfeffer, sauerbraten, Spätzle, Maultasche, Schnitzel, and pumpernickel bread. Lutefisk and other types of pickled and smoked fish were introduced by Scandinavians.

In the 19th century, as the frontier advanced westward, recipes had to be adapted based on the availability of ingredients. Danish frikadeller and aebleskivers were served with locally grown chokecherry or blueberry syrup. Custard-style puddings similar to figgy pudding were made with native wild persimmons. A typical Midwestern breakfast might have included meat, eggs, potatoes, fruit preserves, and pie or doughnuts. At harvest time, families ate mostly home-produced foods.

More settlers began to arrive in the rural Midwest after the Erie Canal was completed in the 1820s. Rural and urban foodways began to diverge as cash-strapped immigrants became dependent on packaged foods.

The expansion of railroads in the 1870s and 1880s allowed fresh citrus fruits to be shipped to the Midwest. At the turn of the century, cruise ships operating along the Great Lakes offered varied dining selections. Seasonal fruits, sirloin steak, and lamb kidney saute with mushrooms were some of the breakfast offerings available in 1913.

Beginning in the 1930s, fine dining was offered on railroad cars. Some of the dishes found on the menu were cashew chicken, baked filet of Lake Superior whitefish au gratin and the ambiguous dessert called "floating island".

=== Ethnic influences ===
Some European foodways have, by wide acceptance, become part of the local cuisine to a degree that they have shed most cultural associations with specific immigrant groups.

A Wurst mart, sometimes spelled Wurstmart or Wurst Markt, is a variation on a fish fry found predominantly in German-American communities. Wurst marts are usually held by churches as fundraising events, where people will pay for a buffet of sausages and other side dishes. Common side dishes include mashed potatoes, gravy, and sauerkraut. Wurst Mart comes from the German word Wurstmarkt, meaning 'sausage market'. Wurst marts are found mostly in small rural German-American communities in the Midwest, particularly around St. Louis.

== Urban centers ==
=== Chicago ===
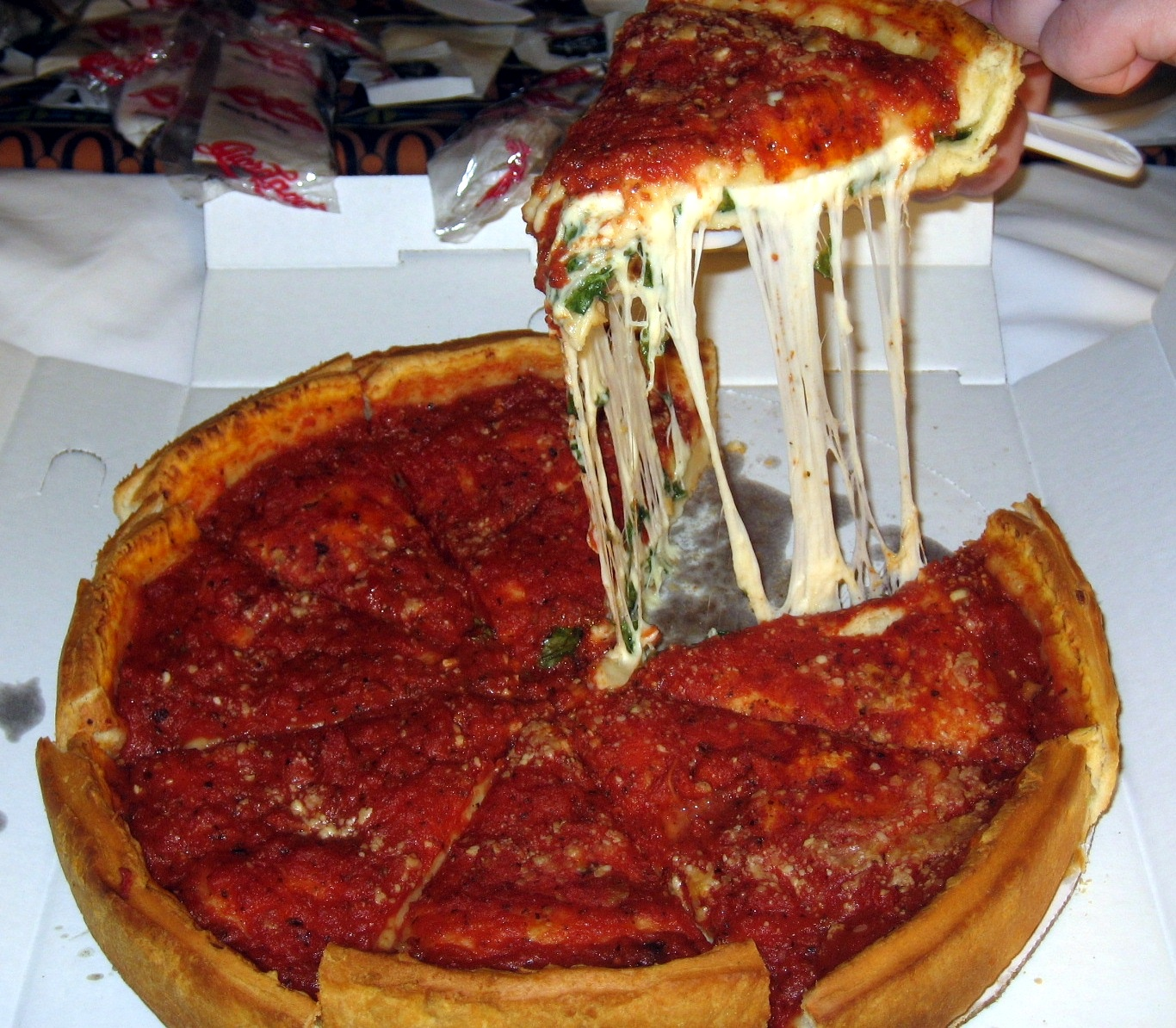
Chicago-style deep dish pizza

The local cuisine of Chicago has been shaped by its Greek, Jewish, and Italian communities. Jewish immigrant communities of Eastern European origin ate oatmeal cereal called krupnik, made with milk only when it was available. Workers carried packed lunches of bagels, knish, and herring to work. Today, restaurants in Chicago's Greektown serve typical dishes like gyros and cheese saganaki.

Throughout the city there are many variations on classic sandwiches like the Chicago-style hot dog or club sandwiches served on bagels or other artisan breads like sourdough or brioche with complex spreads like aioli and piri piri sauce. The iconic Italian beef sandwich, made with slow-cooked tough cuts of beef, originated during the Great Depression.

Italian-American cuisine continued to flourish in Chicago as American forces returned from World War II with a taste for Italian foods. Pepper- and onion-topped Italian pork sausage sandwiches became widely available, and can still be found at festivals, fairs, and ballparks today. Thin-crust pizza arrived in Chicago with Italian immigrants as early as 1909; according to some, the iconic Chicago deep-dish pizza dates to 1943 when it first appeared on Pizzeria Uno menus. Italians are also known for Chicken Vesuvio, bone-in chicken sauteed with oregano and garlic in white wine sauce and finished in the oven with potatoes.

Chicago's cuisine has also seen notable contributions from its Latin American communities. Steamed tamales made from cornmeal filled with seasoned ground beef have been available in Chicago since the 19th century. Puerto Ricans introduced the skirt steak sandwich jibarito. Now also available with chicken, roast pork, ham, shrimp, and even the vegetarian option tofu, the jibarito is distinguished from other sandwiches by substituting green plantains for bread.

Chicago's food processing industry is historically significant. Following the Civil War, Chicago made use of railway networks to establish distribution networks, making fresh beef widely available. For the first time American consumers without access to local livestock could purchase fresh beef. In 1903, James L. Kraft founded a wholesale cheese distribution business in Chicago which became Kraft Foods. Miracle Whip was introduced in 1933 at an industry event. The American Licorice Company founded in Chicago in 1914 makes Red Vines and Super Ropes. Brach's company in Chicago started making candy corn in the 1920s. The Dove Bar was invented in Chicago. Cracker Jack was founded by a German immigrant who in 1871 started selling molasses-coated, steam-popped corn out of a candy shop in Chicago's South Side. Chicago meat packer Gustavus F. Swift is credited with commercializing shipping fresh meat in refrigerated railroad cars. By 1892 the number of refrigerated railroad cars in use exceeded 100,000. Vienna Beef became a major producer of hot dogs and by the early 2000s was one of the major suppliers for hot dog carts. Some other Chicago meatpackers are Armour, Oscar Mayer, Hygrade and Swift.

=== Cincinnati ===
The Queen City is known for its namesake Cincinnati chili, a Greek-inspired meat sauce (ground beef seasoned with cinnamon, nutmeg, allspice, cloves, bay leaf, cumin, and ground chilis), served over spaghetti or hot dogs. Unlike chili con carne, Cincinnati-style chili is almost never eaten by itself and is instead consumed in "ways" or on cheese coneys, which are a regional variation on a chili dog.

The city has a strong German heritage and a variety of German-oriented restaurants and menu items can be found in the area. Goetta, a meat-and-grain sausage or mush made from pork and oats, is unique to the Greater Cincinnati area and "every bit as much a Queen City icon" as Cincinnati chili. It is similar to the traditional porridge-like German peasant food stippgrutze but incorporates a higher proportion of meat-to-grain and is thicker, forming a sliceable loaf. Slices are typically fried like sausage patties and served for breakfast. More than a million pounds of goetta are served in the Cincinnati area per year.

In addition, Cincinnati's Oktoberfest Zinzinnati, an annual food and music celebration held each September, is the second-largest in the world. Taste of Cincinnati, the longest running culinary arts festival in the United States, is held each year on Memorial Day weekend. In 2014, local chefs and food writers organized the inaugural Cincinnati Food & Wine Classic, which drew chefs and artisan food producers from the region.

The area was once a national center for pork processing and is often nicknamed Porkopolis, with many references to that heritage in menu-item names and food-event names; pigs are a "well-loved symbol of the city."

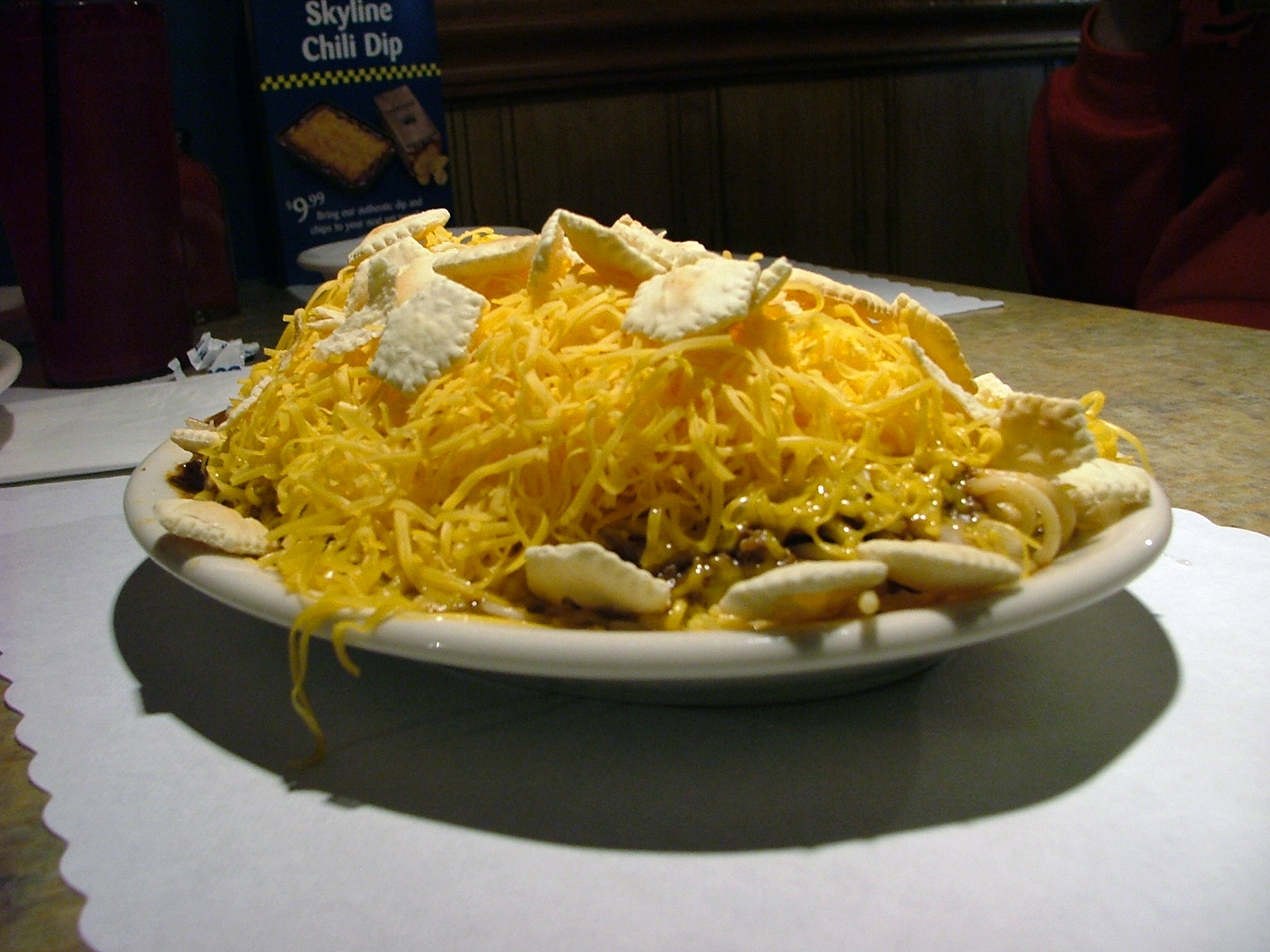
Four-way Cincinnati chili

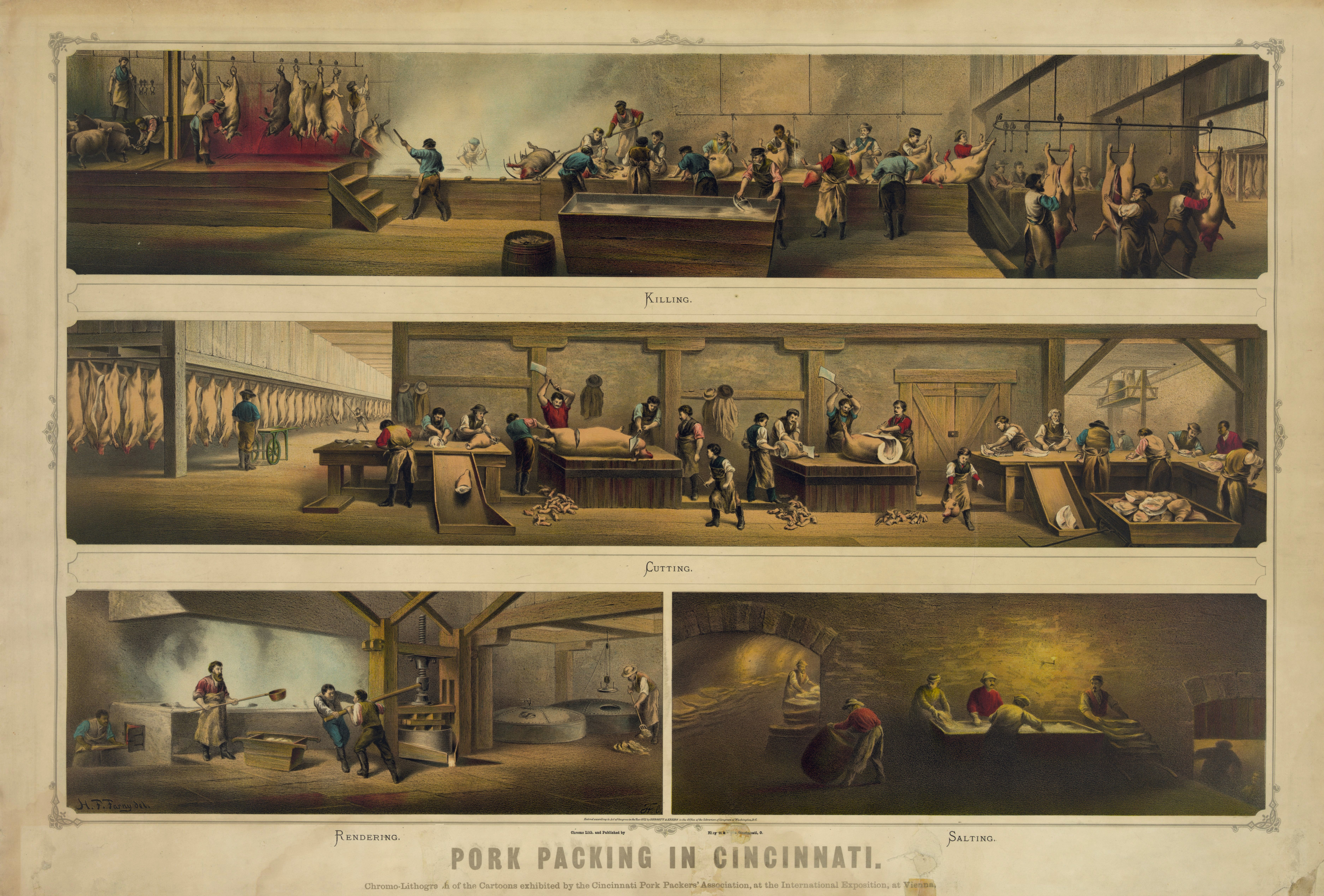
Pork packing in Cincinnati 1873

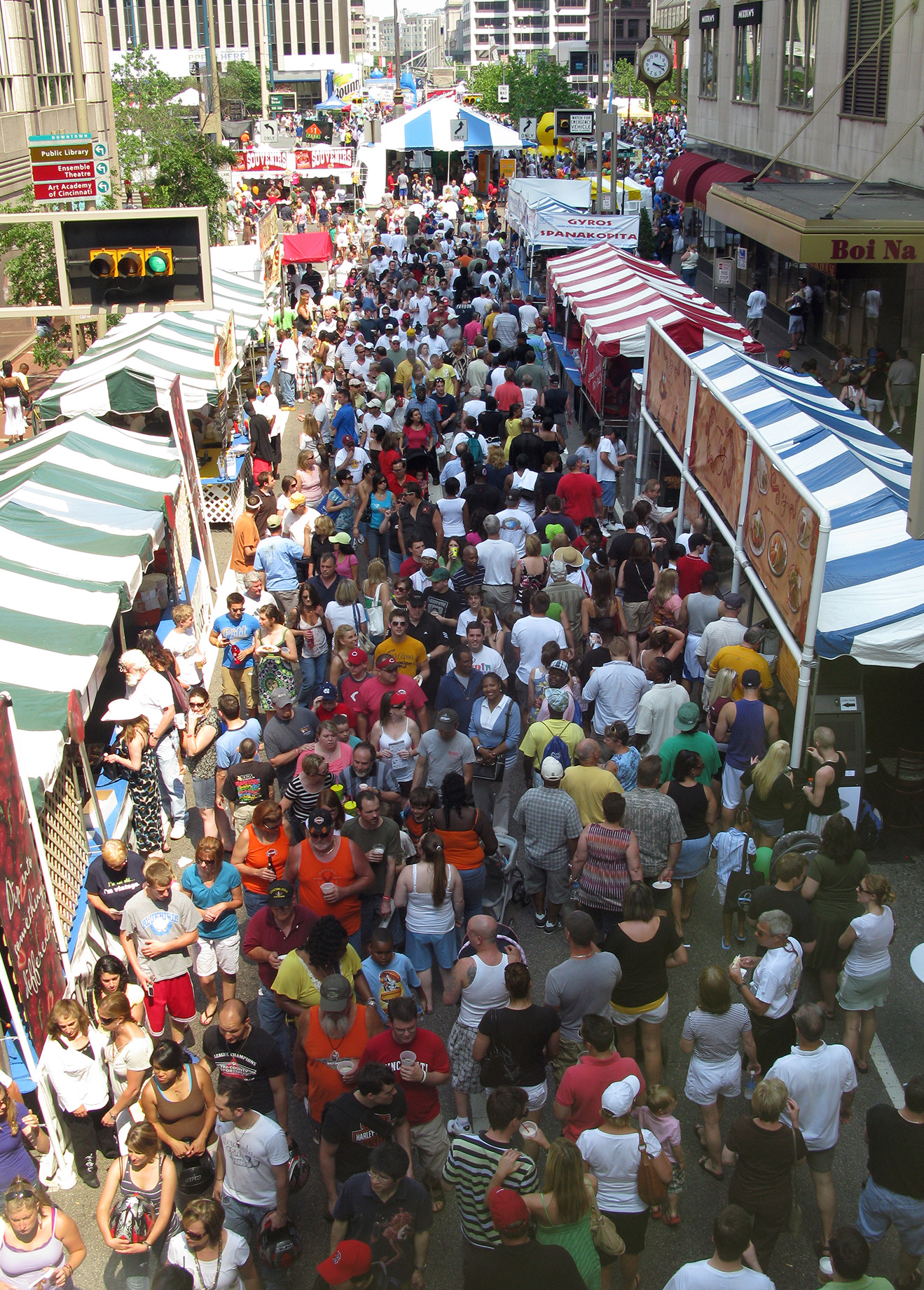
Taste of Cincinnati 2009

=== Columbus ===
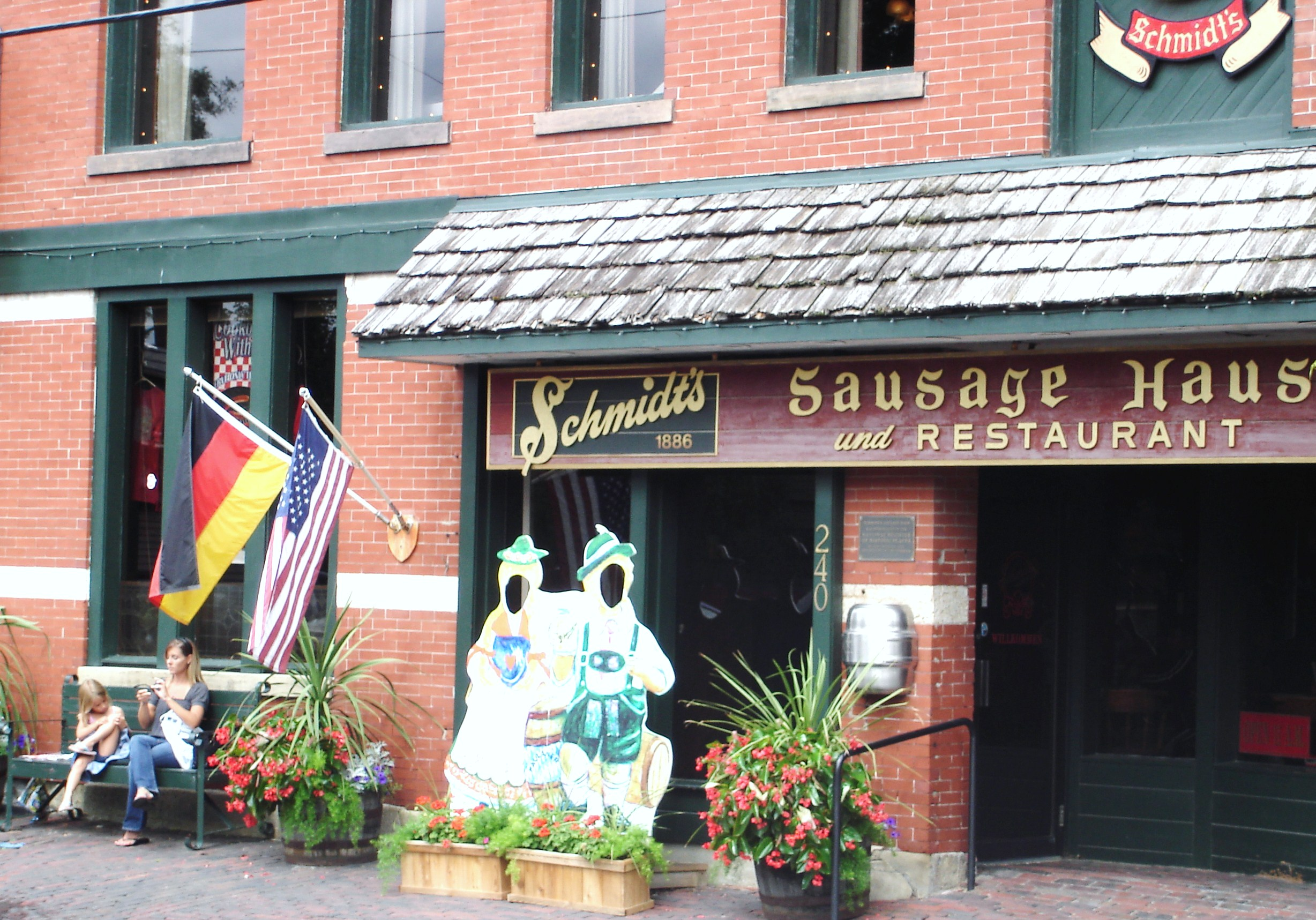
Schmidt's Sausage Haus in German Village, Columbus, Ohio

The Columbus, Ohio area is the home and birthplace of many well-known fast-food chains, especially those known for hamburgers. Wendy's opened its first store in Columbus in 1969, and is now headquartered in nearby Dublin. America's oldest hamburger chain, White Castle, is based there.

Besides burgers, Columbus is noted for the German Village, a neighborhood south of downtown where German cuisine such as sausages and kuchen are served.

In recent years, local restaurants focused on organic, seasonal, and locally or regionally sourced food have become more prevalent, especially in the Short North area, between downtown and the Ohio State University campus. Numerous Somali restaurants are also found in the city, particularly around Cleveland Avenue.

Columbus is also the birthplace of the Marzetti Italian Restaurant, opened in 1896. Owner Teresa Marzetti is credited with creation of the beef-and-pasta casserole named after her brother-in-law, Johnny Marzetti. The restaurant's popular salad dressings became the foundation for the T. Marzetti Company, an international specialty foods manufacturer and distributor, headquartered in Columbus.

=== Cleveland ===
Cleveland's many immigrant groups and heavily blue-collar demographic have long played an important role in defining the area's cuisine. Ethnically, Italian foods as well as several Eastern European cuisines, particularly those of Poland and Hungary, have become gastronomical staples in the Greater Cleveland area.

Prominent examples of these include cavatelli, rigatoni, pizza, Chicken paprikash, stuffed cabbage, pierogi, and kielbasa all of which are widely popular in and around the city.

Local specialties, such as the pork-based dish City Chicken and the Polish Boy (a loaded sausage sandwich native to Cleveland), are dishes definitive of a cuisine that is based on hearty, inexpensive fare. Commercially, Hector Boiardi (aka Chef Boyardee) started his business in Cleveland's Little Italy.

In Italian bakeries around the Cleveland area, a variation of the cassata cake is widely popular. This local version, commonly called the "Cleveland-style cassata", differs from the cassata siciliana in that it is made with layers of sponge cake, custard, and strawberries, then frosted with whipped cream. The cake is sold at bakeries throughout the Midwest region, including the Cleveland-area Corbo's, Presti's, and LaPuma Bakery (credited with creating the cake back in the 1920s).

=== Detroit ===
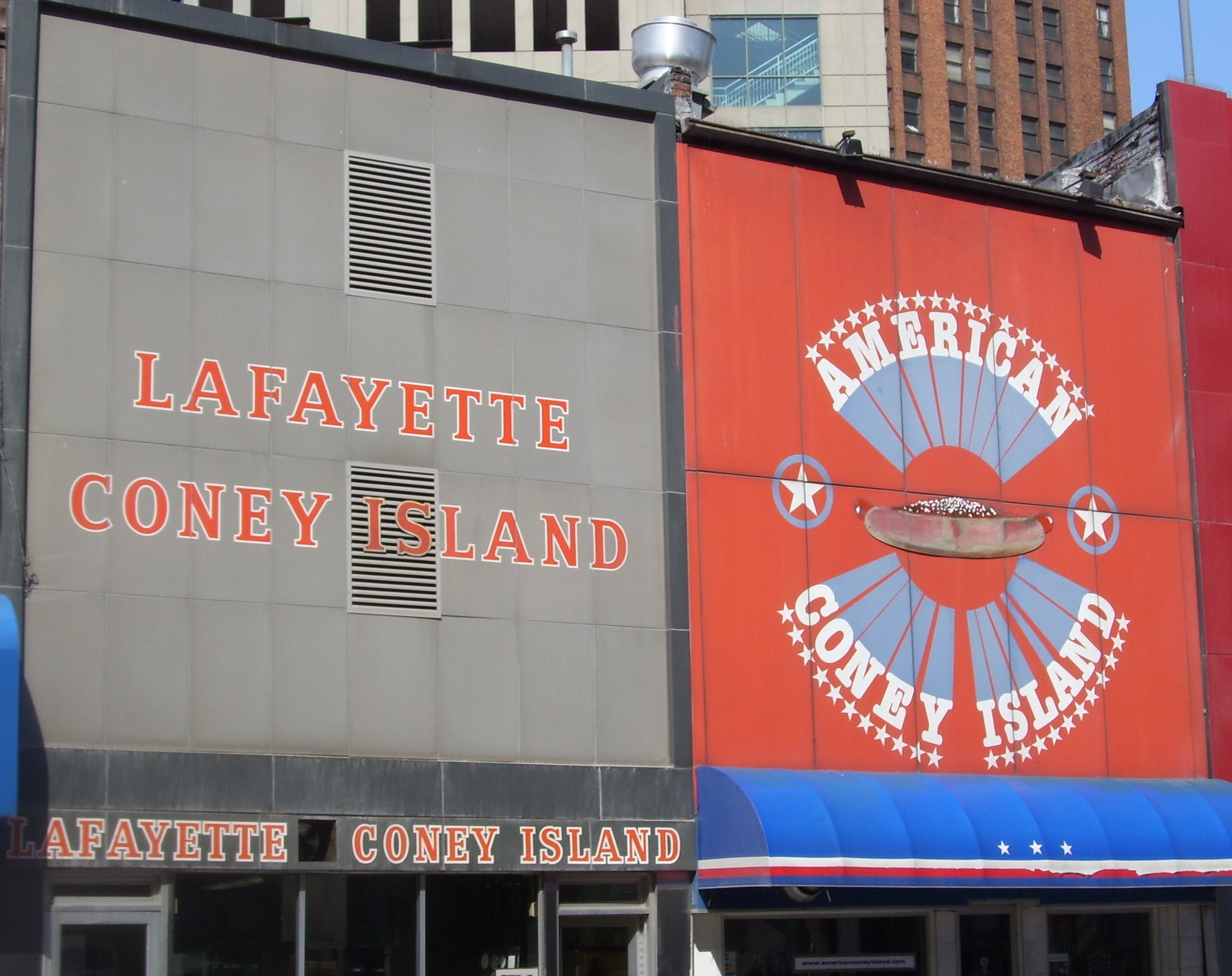
Competing, neighboring Coney Island hot dog restaurants in Detroit

Detroit specialties include Coney Island hot dogs, found at hundreds of unaffiliated "Coney Island" restaurants. Not to be confused with a chili dog, a coney is served with a ground beef sauce, chopped onions, and mustard.

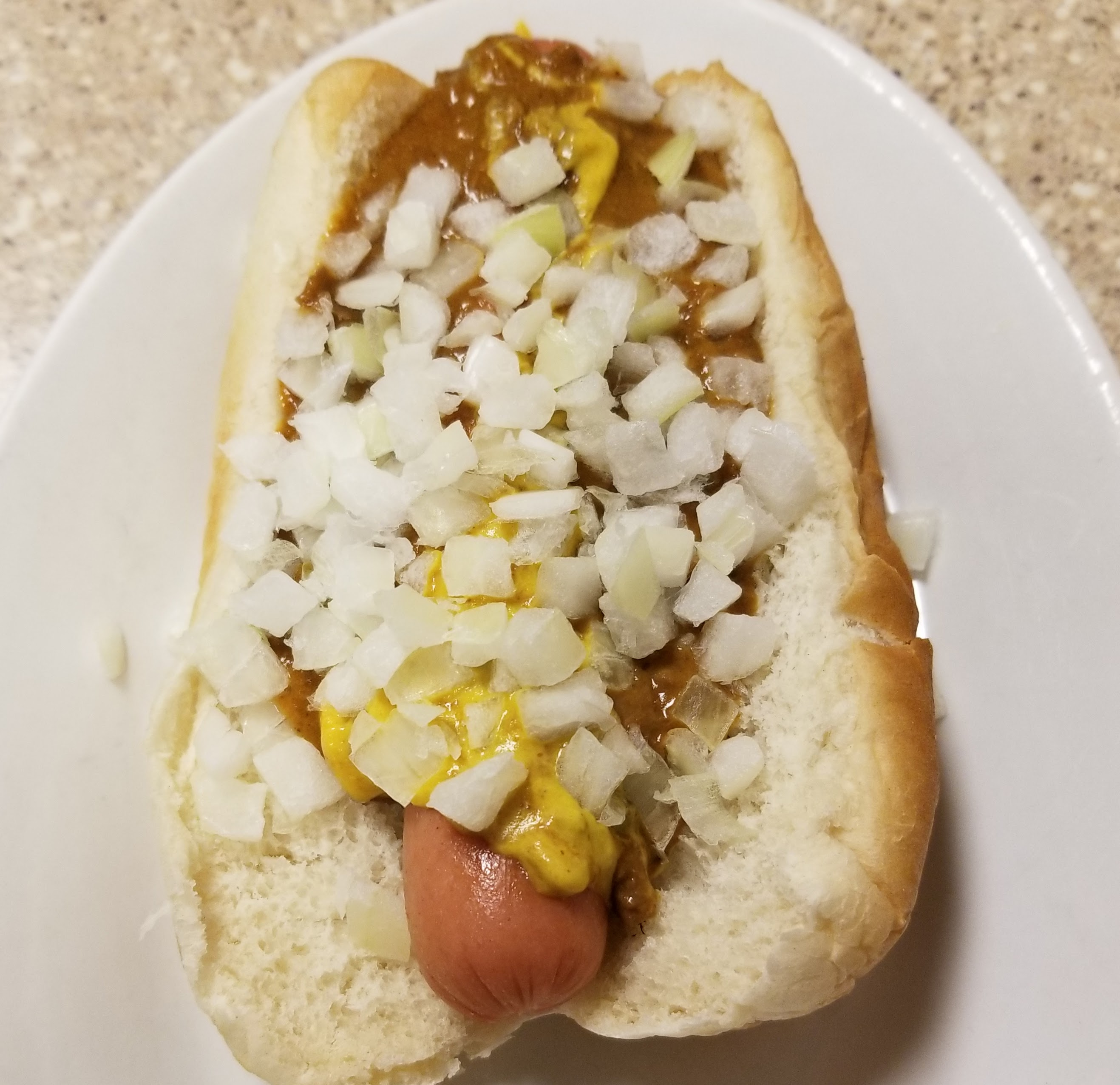
A Coney Island hot dog

The Coney Special has an additional ground beef topping. It is often served with French fries. Food writers Jane and Michael Stern call out Detroit as the only "place to start" in pinpointing "the top Coney Islands in the land."

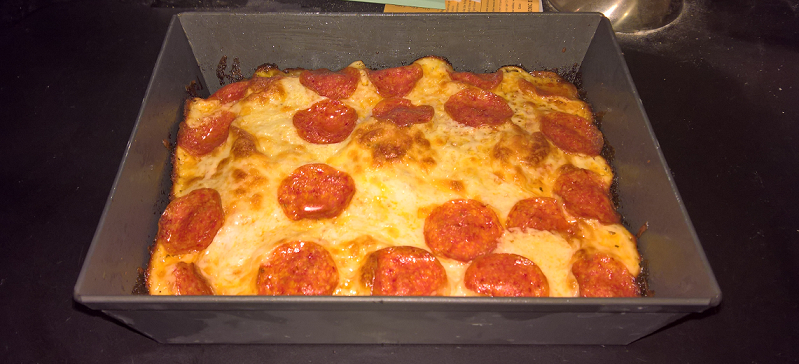
Detroit-style pizza

Detroit also has its own style of pizza called Detroit-style Pizza. It is a rectangular pan pizza with a thick, crisp, chewy crust. It is traditionally topped to the edges with mozzarella or Wisconsin brick cheese, which caramelizes against the high-sided heavyweight rectangular pan.

Polish food is also prominent in the region, including popular dishes such as pierogi, borscht, and pączki. Bakeries concentrated in the Polish enclave of Hamtramck, Michigan, within the city, are celebrated for their pączki, especially on Fat Tuesday. Detroit is also known for its corned beef sandwiches. Hungarian food is featured in nearby eastern Toledo, Ohio with Tony Packo's Hungarian hot dog, a form of kolbász.

=== Kansas City ===
Kansas City is an important barbecue and meat-processing center with a distinctive barbecue style. The Kansas City metropolitan area has more than 100 barbecue restaurants and proclaims itself to be the "world's barbecue capital."

The Kansas City Barbeque Society spreads its influence across the nation through its barbecue-contest standards. Kansas City's barbecue craze can be traced back to Henry Perry, who in the early 1920s started barbecuing in an outdoor pit adjacent to his streetcar barn.

=== St. Louis ===
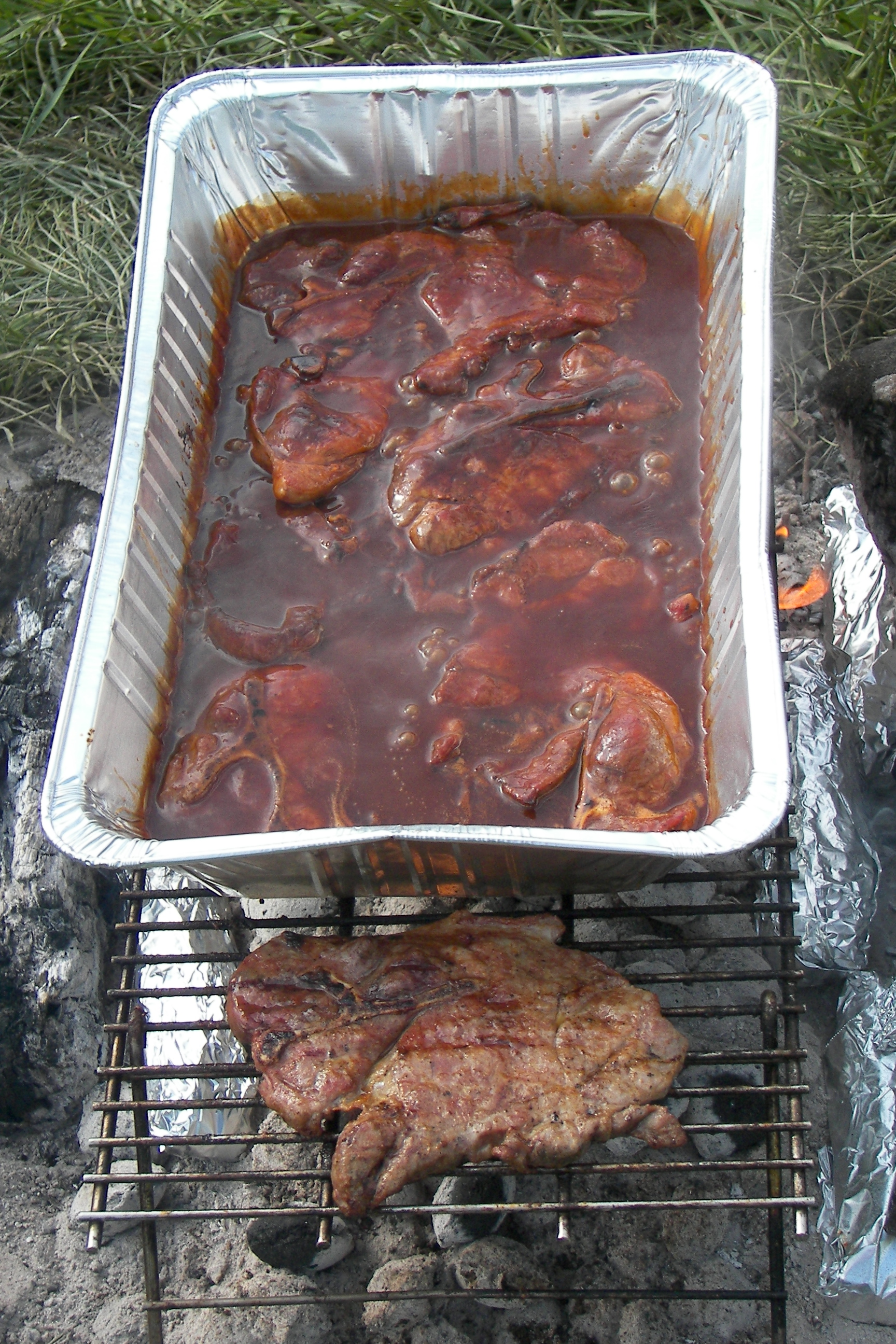
Pork steaks cooking

The large number of Irish and German immigrants who came to St. Louis beginning in the early 19th century contributed significantly to the shaping of local cuisine by their uses of beef, pork, and chicken, often roasted or grilled, and desserts including rich cakes, stollens, fruit pies, doughnuts, and cookies. A local form of fresh-stick pretzel, called Gus's Pretzels, has been sold singly and by the bagful by street-corner vendors.

Mayfair salad dressing was a mainstay at a St. Louis hotel of the same name, and one of the original recipes from the 1904 St. Louis World's Fair.

St. Louis is also known for popularizing the ice cream cone and for inventing gooey butter cake (a rich, soft-centered coffee cake) and frozen custard. Iced tea is also rumored to have been invented at the World's Fair, as well as the hot dog bun.

A staple of grilling in St. Louis is the pork steak, which is sliced from the shoulder of the pig and often basted with or simmered in barbecue sauce during cooking.

Other popular grilled items include crispy snoots, cut from the cheeks and nostrils of the pig; bratwurst; and Italian sausage, often referred to as "sah-zittsa," a localization of its Italian name, salsiccia. Maull's is a popular brand of barbecue sauce in the St. Louis area.

Restaurants on The Hill reflect the lasting influence of the early 20th-century Milanese and Sicilian immigrant community. Two unique Italian-American style dishes include "toasted" ravioli, which is breaded and fried, and St. Louis-style pizza, which has a crisp, thin crust and is usually made with Provel cheese instead of traditional mozzarella.

A poor boy sandwich is the traditional name in St. Louis for a submarine sandwich. A St. Paul sandwich is a St. Louis sandwich, available in Chinese-American restaurants. A slinger is a diner and late-night specialty consisting of eggs, hash browns, and hamburger, topped with chili, cheese, and onion.

=== Milwaukee ===
Traditional cuisine in Wisconsin was influenced by the European immigration there, so much, that it could be considered the "most European in the United States". Foods frequently considered comfort foods, and foods signature to Wisconsin culture in Milwaukee include cheese dishes, butter burgers, beer, Bloody Marys, beer soup, cheese curds, fish fry, and bratwursts. There is a sizeable number of farms spread across Wisconsin for dairy, corn, and meat production.

=== Twin Cities of Minnesota ===
Once known as "Mill City", homemade breads and pies feature prominently in Minneapolis cuisine. Bread and cakes available at the Eagle Bakery in 1850 included fruitcake, pound cake and something called "Fancy cake" for the holidays. In the 1930s, there were four Jewish bakeries within a few blocks of each other baking bagels and other fresh breads. Jewish families purchased challah loaves for their Sabbath meal at the North Side Bakery. There were two kosher meat markets and four Jewish delicatessens, one of which began distribution for what would become Sara Lee frozen cheesecakes. The delis sold sandwiches like corned beef and salami.

Minneapolis is more racially and ethnically diverse than the rest of Minnesota. For the diverse ethnic groups that call Minneapolis home, retaining their distinct ethnic culture remains a goal that is supported by ethnic-oriented community organizations. Celebrating ethnic holidays and get togethers by preparing traditional foods remains a major symbol of cultural retention. It is a way people share their heritage and culture with outsiders. There are a plethora of restaurants serving ethnic cuisines.

Today, there are many restaurants serving various Polish dishes like polish sausage, pierogies and stuffed cabbage rolls. and typical German foods like rippchen, knackwurst, and wiener schnitzel. Traditionally, potato salad and kraut were served alongside an entree of bratwurst or ham hocks. A side of spaetzle and red cabbage would accompany sauerbraten or rouladen.

In the fall, the Twin Cities share along with Green Bay, Wisconsin, the tradition of the neighborhood booyah, a cuisine and cultural event featuring a hodge-podge of ingredients in stews.

American restaurants in the Twin Cities supply a wide spectrum of choices and styles that range from small diners, sports bars and decades-old supper clubs to high-end steakhouses and eateries that serve new American cuisine using locally grown ingredients. The Jucy Lucy (or "Juicy Lucy"), claimed as an innovation of the local pubs, is a hamburger with a core of melted cheese. Barbecue restaurants in the area tend to feature a combination of the various regional styles of this type of cooking.

Minneapolis and St. Paul also offer a diverse array of cuisines influenced by their many immigrant groups. In the 1970s the Twin Cities saw a large influx of Southeast Asian immigrants from Cambodia, Laos, Thailand and Vietnam. Asian cuisine was initially dominated by Chinese Cantonese immigrants that served Americanized offerings. In 1883 Woo Yee Sing and his younger brother, Woo Du Sing, opened the Canton Cafe in Minneapolis, the first Chinese restaurant in Minnesota. Authentic offerings began at the influential Nankin Cafe which opened in 1919, and many new Chinese immigrants soon took this cuisine throughout the Twin Cities and to the suburbs. The cuisine of Japan has been present since the opening of the area's very first Japanese restaurant, Fuji Ya in 1959. Since 1976 Supenn Supatanskinkasem has been cooking and serving Thai food through her Minnesota State Fair Booth, Siam Café, and Sawatdee chain of Thai restaurants. Modern dining options include phở noodle shops, banh mi and Thai curry restaurants.

Restaurants offering other cuisines of Asia including those from Afghanistan, India, Nepal and the Philippines are also recent additions to the Twin Cities dining scene. Local ingredients are often integrated into Asian offerings, for example Chinese steamed walleye and Nepalese curried bison.

Mexican and Tex-Mex restaurants serve tacos, tortas, tamales and other similar dishes. Cuisines from Argentina, Brazil, Cuba, Ecuador, Peru and the Spanish Speaking West Indies are also represented, as well as Native American cuisine.

The Twin Cities are home to many restaurants that serve the cuisines of the Mediterranean, Middle East and Northeast Africa including, Greek, Ethiopian and Somalia have also opened a number of restaurants in Minnesota.

West-African immigrants have brought their own cuisine in recent years. There is also a presence of Afro-Caribbean restaurants, with the famed Nicollet Avenue in Minneapolis being home to two Caribbean restaurants.

=== Omaha ===
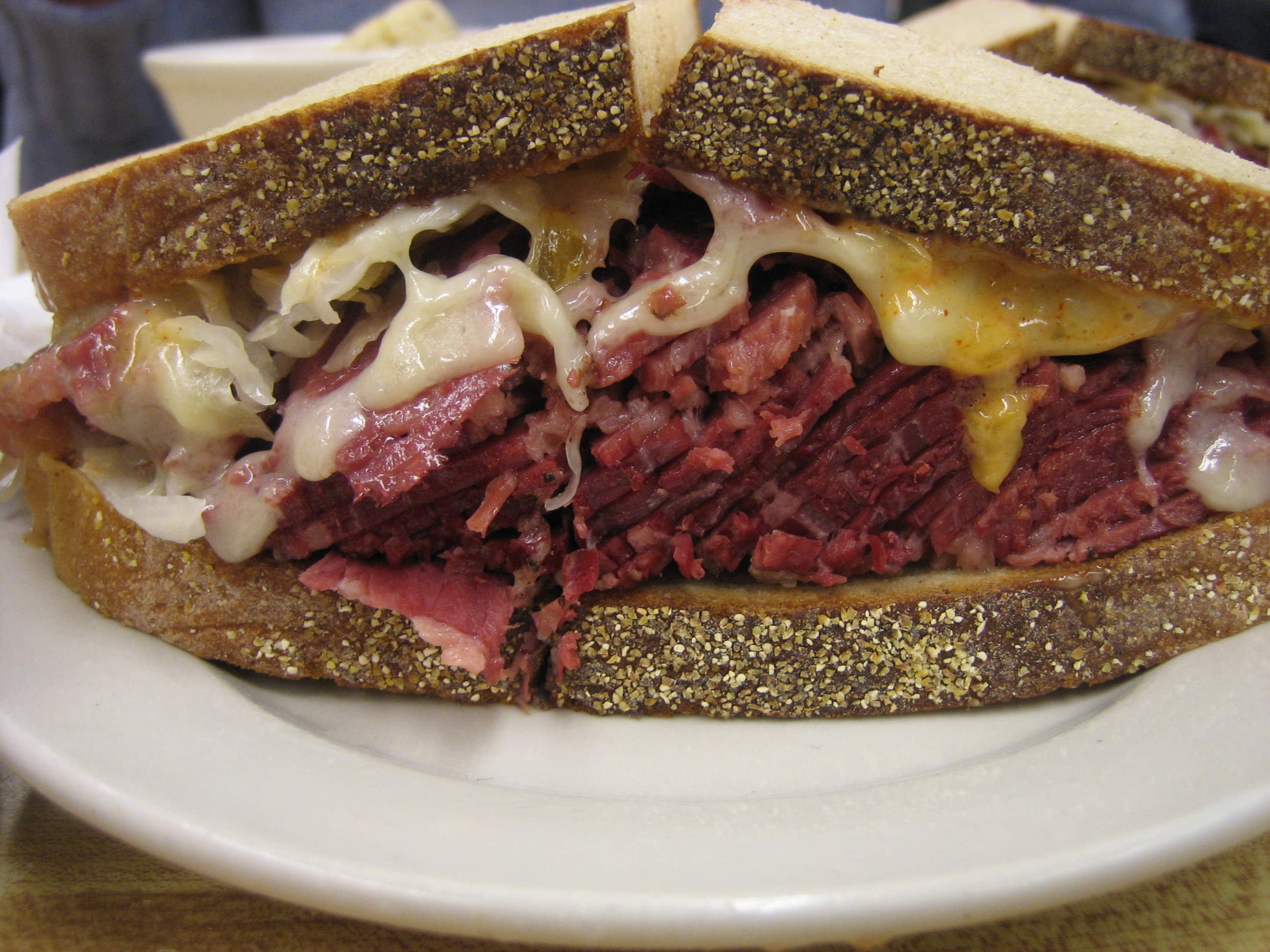
A Reuben sandwich is a hot sandwich of corned beef or pastrami, sauerkraut and Swiss cheese, with Russian or Thousand Island dressing on rye bread

Omaha is known for its steakhouses, many of which have closed.

Central European and Southern influences can be seen in the local popularity of carp and South 24th Street contains a multitude of Mexican restaurants. North Omaha also has its own barbecue style.

Omaha is one of the places claiming to have invented the reuben sandwich, supposedly named for Reuben Kulakofsky, a grocer from the Dundee neighborhood.

Godfather's Pizza is one of the chain restaurants that originated in Omaha.

The cheese frenchee is also a local favorite and staple, originating from the original King's Food Host fast-food restaurants.

== Regional specialties ==
=== Illinois ===
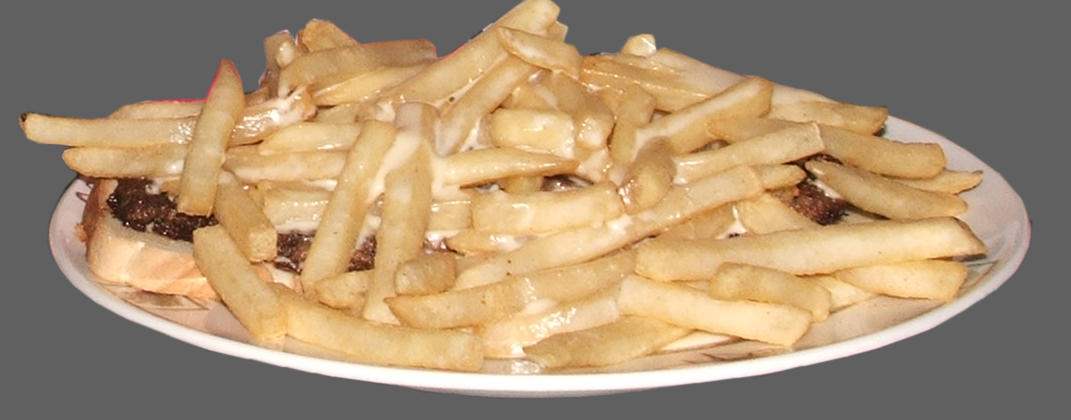
The Horseshoe sandwich originates from Springfield, Illinois

Early settlement in Illinois along the Ohio River included farm owners, tenant farmers and sharecroppers. The lowest rung were called "river rats", similar to folks who lived along the Illinois River foraging for clams and mussels, mostly German, Irish, English and Appalachian. During winter months when fish, clams and mussels were inaccessible the "river people", or alternately "shantyboat dwellers" hunted possums, beaver or raccoons. Lower-income families consumed less milk, meat and eggs in general. Whole milk was usually not available outside wealthy families, but children were sometimes given skimmed milk.

Beans, pork, and potatoes were dietary staples in Southern Illinois. Fried eggs, fried pork, biscuits, fruit preserves and coffee were traditional breakfast foods. Dinner options consisted of boiled or fried potatoes, green beans cooked in fat, boiled pork, fried fat pork, sliced tomatoes, lettuce wilted with vinegar, macaroni with tomatoes, pie and cake.

German settlers arriving in the 19th century brought foods like wienerschnitzel, sauerbraten, potato pancakes, rouladen, bratwurst, liverwurst, hasenpfeffer, liver dumplings, cakes like Black Forest cake, Lebkuchen and Schnecken, strudel and cookie recipes like Sandbakelse and Pfeffernüsse.

By 1890, fish from the Illinois river were being sent upstream to Chicago for sale in commercial markets on the east coast. Carp and buffalo fish were used to make gefilte fish or fried carp in cornmeal batter.

The horseshoe sandwich is rarely seen outside Central Illinois. The original version from Springfield was an open-faced sandwich made from a horseshoe-shaped ham steak and two pieces of white toast but it is available with other types of meat like chicken cutlets or hamburger. The sandwich is served with a cheese sauce similar to Welsh rarebit and french fries.

=== Indiana ===
Indiana claims shoreline along Lake Michigan, so freshwater fish like perch and walleye have a place on local menus. Biscuits and gravy, topped with sausage gravy, can be found at diners throughout the state, sometimes served with eggs on the side, or other breakfast sides like home fries.

Chicken and noodles (or beef and noodles) are served over mashed potatoes. German pubs serve traditional fare like sausages, schnitzels, rouladen, and sauerbraten. Fried brain sandwich is not very common any more but was more widely available in the past. It was first brought to Evansville by German immigrants.

Indiana produces roughly 25,000 gallons of maple syrup each year, making it a popular condiment for different sweet and savory foods.

Fried biscuits are a specialty of the state, served with cinnamon sugar and spiced apple butter. Deep-fried pork tenderloin and fried bologna sandwiches are popular in Indianapolis and other parts of the state. Turkey and Beef Manhattan dishes originated in Indianapolis and can be found in diners across the state.

Fried chicken is a staple of after-church dinner on Sundays (Indiana's version uses more black pepper than most). A popular dish seen almost exclusively in Indiana is sugar cream pie (also called Hoosier pie) which most likely originated in the state's Amish community. Some say it originated with the Shaker settlements along Indiana's eastern border with Ohio. The simple milk and sugar pie may be related to the Amish Bob Andy pie, Pennsylvania's shoo-fly pie and North Carolina's brown sugar pie. Persimmon pudding made with sweet, wild persimmons is a typical Thanksgiving dish in Indiana.

Indiana produces more popcorn than any other state except Nebraska.

A common breakfast food found throughout Indiana is fried cornmeal mush, a dish consisting of cornmeal which is boiled, then cut into pieces and fried in oil. The dish is normally served with maple syrup or molasses on top.

=== Iowa ===
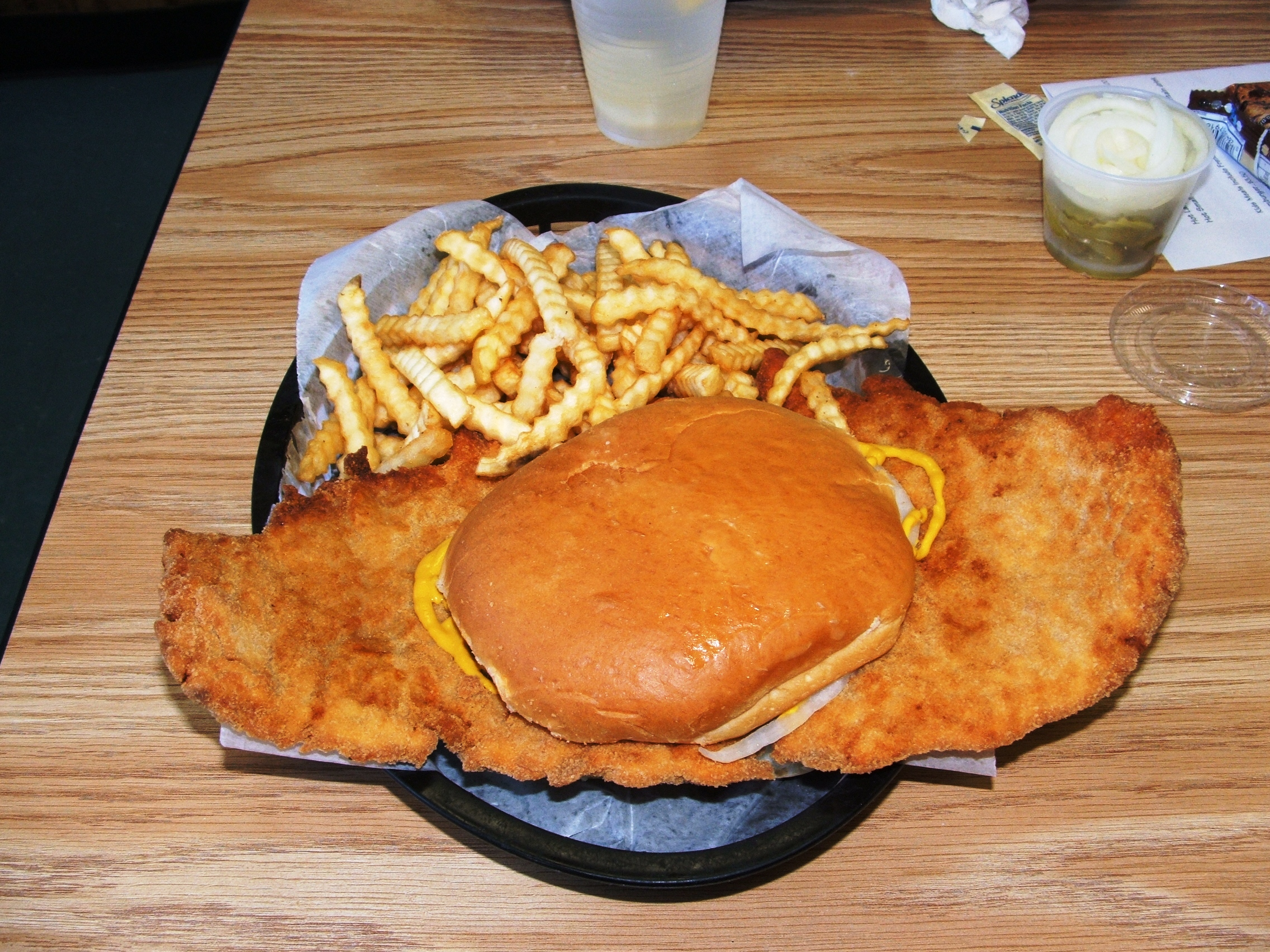
Pork tenderloin sandwich as served in Cedar Rapids, Iowa

When French Icarians arrived in the 19th century their simple meals were put together using just a few basics: milk, butter, bacon and corn bread. The Amana Colony settled on the rich soils of Iowa and until the 1930s their meals were provided by communal kitchens supplied by the village orchards, communal gardens, vineyards, bakery, smokehouse and dairy.

Iowa's last communal meal was served in 1932. Traditional recipes from Amana's communal kitchens include radish salad, apple bread, strawberry rhubarb pie, and dumpling soup.

Danish immigrants brought apple cake and spherical æbleskiver pancakes. Dutch letters, pastries filled with almond paste and shaped like an 'S,' are also common in Iowa, although they were historically only made for Sinterklaas Day. Iowa's Dutch bakeries offer other baked goods like speculaas and boter koek.

Czech immigrants contributed pastry filled with sweetened fruit or cheese called kolaches. Kringla, krumkake and lefse are found at church suppers throughout the holiday season when a typical lutefisk dinner would include mashed potatoes, cranberry salad, corn, rutabaga, rømmegrøt, meatballs with gravy, and Norwegian pastry for dessert.

Recipes compiled and published by the Des Moines Register include salmon mousse, fresh gazpacho, apple coleslaw, cabbage n' macaroni slaw, other slaws, soups, and dips, and various salads like turkey-melon, shrimp-yogurt and pasta-blackbean, including one gelatin-based salad made with 7 Up, lemon-lime gelatin, crushed pineapple, marshmallow and bananas. Other gelatin based salads included blueberry salad and a "Good Salad" which included a mix of puddings, orange gelatin and citrus fruits.

Sliced pickle wraps or roll-ups made with dill pickles wrapped in cream cheese and ham may have derived from German cuisine.

Basic soups included cauliflower-cheddar garnished with scallions, cream of carrot made with milk and rice, and beef noodle soup made with frozen vegetables and beef bouillon.

Various beverage offerings included cool apple-mint tea, German beer, a citrus mix that included orange juice, lemonade powder and club soda, as well as coffee flavored with cinnamon.

The state is the center for loose-meat sandwiches, also called tavern sandwiches and appearing on many menus by each restaurant's unique name for them. They originated in the region in the Ye Olde Tavern restaurant in 1934 before being popularized by Maid-Rite in 1936, which now has franchises in other Midwestern states. The original Maid-Rite sandwich from the 1920s is a ground meat sandwich with pickles, ketchup, mustard, and onions. Hot beef sandwich is made with leftover pot roast topped with gravy and mashed potatoes.

Iowa is the leading pork producer in the United States. This is reflected in Iowan cuisine, which includes the pork tenderloin sandwich (or simply "pork tenderloin"), consisting of a lean section of boneless pork loin pounded flat, breaded, and deep fried before being served on a seeded hamburger bun with any or all of ketchup, mustard, mayonnaise, and dill pickle slices. It is a popular "fair food" at the Iowa State Fair where the meat of a pork tenderloin sandwich is often far larger than the area of the bun. Burgers are made with local beef.

Iowa is the leader in corn production in the United States, also leading in production of eggs and pork. One well-known variety of sweet corn grown in Iowa is the bi-color peaches and cream.

Rhubarb grows well in Iowa and is used for sauces, jams, cakes and pies. Heirloom varieties like Green Moldovan tomatoes, St. Valery carrot and Cimarron lettuce are still grown at the Plum Grove Historic Site.

Locally brewed beers like pale ale and lager varieties are made with wheat and barley.

=== Kansas ===
Potluck suppers, farmhouse meals and after-church Sunday dinners are part of the food culture of Kansas. Smoked brisket, pork shoulder, short ribs, hot wings, and fried chicken are served with sides like macaroni and cheese, mashed potatoes, string beans, jalapeno poppers, jello salads, and cheesy potatoes and some places still offer whole hog barbecue. Kansas is a cattle-producing state so pot roasts and steak dinners are staples of the local diet.

Classic comfort foods like fried chicken and chicken fried steak are standard diner fare. Chili is served alongside cinnamon rolls in a commonly found but unlikely pairing.

Pies include cherry pie, coconut meringue pie and coconut cream pie.

Bierock is a stuffed yeast bread filled with sausage, ground beef, cabbage and onion that was introduced by Volga Germans. It was a hearty, portable lunch for field laborers. Today, it can be found in varieties like garlic chicken or vegetable.

Similarly, the Czech pastry kolaches are yeast buns available with a range of fruit- and cheese-based fillings like prune, apricot, cottage cheese, cherry, apple, peach and poppy seed. Cake doughnuts like pumpkin spice, maple, and caramel apple are produced seasonally.

==== Alcoholic beverages ====
As of November 2006, Kansas still has 29 dry counties; only 17 counties have passed liquor-by-the-drink without a food sales requirement. Today there are more than 2600 liquor and 4000 cereal malt beverage licensees in the state.

=== Michigan ===
Michigan is a large producer of asparagus, a vegetable crop widespread in spring. Western and northern Michigan are notable in the production of apples, blueberries, and cherries. The Northwestern region of Michigan's Lower Peninsula accounts for approximately 75 percent of the U.S. crop of tart cherries, usually about 250 million pounds (11.3 Gg). A popular dish, Michigan chicken salad, includes cherries and often apples. Fruit salsas are also popular, with cherry salsa being especially prominent.

Michigan's wine and beer industries are substantial in the region. The Traverse City area is a popular destination to visit wineries and the state makes many varieties of wine, such as Rieslings, ice wines, and fruit wines. Micro-breweries continue to blossom, creating a wide range of unique beers. Grand Rapids was voted Beer City USA 2013 in the Beer City USA poll, with Founders being the largest of Grand Rapids' breweries. Bell's, another large Michigan craft brewery, is located further south in Kalamazoo.

Michigan is the home of both Post and Kellogg, with Battle Creek being called Cereal City. Vernor's ginger ale and Faygo pop also originate in Michigan. Vernor's ginger ale is often used as a home remedy for an upset stomach. Additionally, two of the three largest pizza companies in the world, Little Caesars and Domino's Pizza, both originate in Michigan.

Coney Islands, a diner originating with Greek immigrants in Detroit, are fairly common throughout the state. A coney is a natural-casing hot dog on a bun, topped with raw onion, mustard, and coney sauce, a type of chili. Cheese may be added as well and variations are found throughout the state, with each city claiming theirs is the best.

These diners usually also have gyros served with cucumber or honey-mustard sauce, as well as hamburgers, sandwiches, breakfast, and dinner entrees. Most Coney Islands are open 24 hours and are a popular place to get a late or early coffee.

In Polish communities throughout the state, pączki can be found every year on Fat Tuesday (Mardi Gras) in a wide assortment of flavors including lemon, blueberry, prune, and custard. Pierogis, goulash, and Polish-style sausage are common specialties in many restaurants.

Fish fries are common on Fridays and during Lent, usually set up buffet-style with items including rolls, potatoes (typically in the form of french fries and mashed), salad, coleslaw, apple sauce, deep-fried fish, and sometimes fried shrimp and baked fish.

Fish is generally popular throughout the state due to the state's location on four of the Great Lakes. Trout, walleye, perch, and catfish are common. Whitefish is a regional specialty usually offered along the coast, with smoked whitefish and whitefish dip being noteworthy.

Cornish immigrant miners introduced the pasty to Michigan's Upper Peninsula (U.P.) as a convenient meal to take to work in the numerous copper, iron, silver, and nickel mines of that region. The pasty is today considered iconic of the U.P.

Fudge is commonly sold in tourist areas, with Mackinac Island being most famous for its fudge, traditionally chocolate, but there is a wide variety of flavors from mint to maple and may include nuts, fruit, or other candy pieces.

=== Minnesota ===
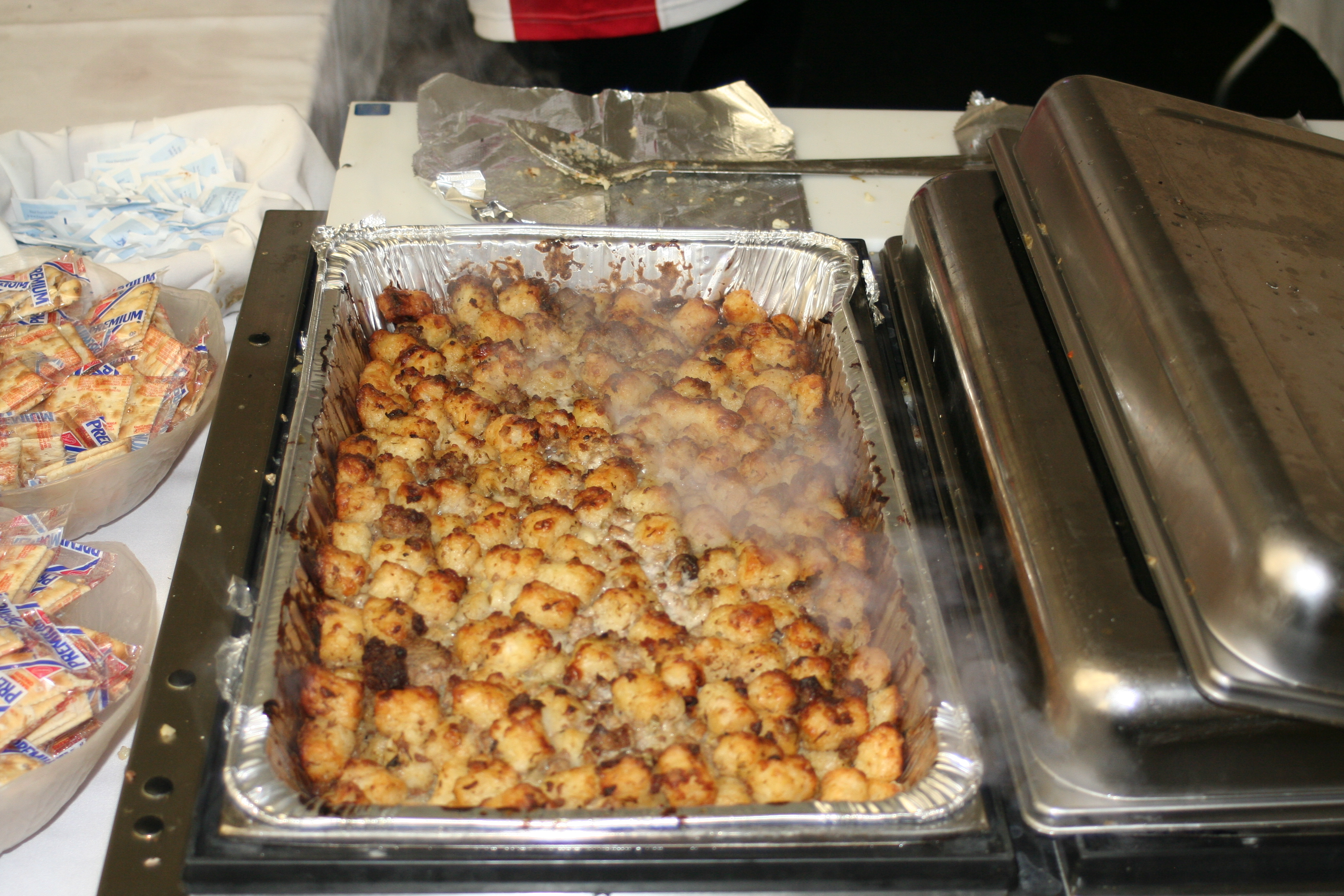
A tater tot hotdish at the Saint Paul, Minnesota, Winter Carnival

Minnesota is known for its church potlucks, where hotdish is often served. Hotdish is any of a variety of casserole dishes, which are popular throughout the United States, although the term hotdish is used mainly in Minnesota, Wisconsin, North Dakota, and South Dakota. Hotdishes are filling comfort foods that are convenient and easy to make. Tater tot hotdish is a popular dish, and as Minnesota is one of the leading producers of wild rice, wild rice hotdishes are quite popular. Dessert bars are the second of the two essentials for potlucks in Minnesota. Other dishes include glorified rice, German baked apples and cookie salad.

Walleye, trout, herring, crappie, lutefisk, wild rice, raspberry, blueberry and strawberry are preferred ingredients in modern Minnesotan cuisine. Typical sides include mashed potatoes, pickles, jello salad, locally grown boiled new potatoes seasoned with fresh herbs or horseradish, baked beans, and vegetables like sweet corn on the cob, or buttered peas, carrots and green beans. Preferred to rice or pasta, potatoes are often served alongside buttered rolls and homemade strawberry jam.

Food selections served at the annual Minnesota State Fair in past years have included watermelon pickles, baked beans, hot dogs, buffalo burgers, deep-fried cheese curds, glazed ham and homemade apple pie. New foods for 2019 included fried tacos on a stick, Turkish pizza, stuffed cabbage rolls, feta bites, shrimp and grits fritters, blueberry key lime pie and assorted other dessert selections.

Scandinavian cuisine has had a significant impact on the cuisine of Minnesota. The cafe at the American Swedish Institute serves Swedish dishes like gravlax with dill, potato dumplings and Swedish meatballs with lingonberry jam. Among the state's most iconic dishes are lefse and lutefisk. Made from stockfish (air-dried whitefish) and soda lye (lut), the dish was brought to the state by Scandinavian immigrants. Lefse is a Norwegian flatbread made from flour, potatoes, cream and butter, and in Minnesota it is commonly prepared for Christmas dinner. Scandinavian rice pudding is also served during the holidays.

In northern Minnesota, along the North Shore of Lake Superior, commercial fishing has been practiced for generations. Settlers were used to the cold, rugged work as many of these immigrants came directly from the coastal fishing villages of Norway. Ciscoes (also known as lake herring), lake trout, lake whitefish, and rainbow smelt are still commercially fished today. Smoked or sugar-cured trout is prepared from local fish in areas along the North Shore like Duluth. Walleye is the state fish of Minnesota and it is common to find it on restaurant menus. Battered and deep-fried is a popular preparation for walleye, as is grilling. Many restaurants feature walleye on their Friday night fish fry.

Letters and household accounts of Minnesota residents give details of mid-19th century frontier cuisine. A farmer's wife writes to her cousin about harvest in Rochester, Minnesota: "My hand is so tired perhaps you'll excuse penciling", explaining she woke before four to skim milk, churn butter and bake "6 loaves of bread & seven pumpkin pies". In the 1850s, supplies could not keep pace with settlement, though steamboats regularly brought in sugar-cured hams, oysters, herring, sardines, alcohol, salt pork and other supplies. In those days a full multi-course meal served for a special occasions would have started with a typical soup followed by a choice of local fish and the so-called "boiled dishes" like chicken with egg sauce, ham or corned beef. Entrees were followed by assorted roast meats served with cranberry sauce. Early Minnesotans used cranberries in pies, molded desserts and frozen confections.

Arriving in the 19th century, immigrants from Eastern Europe opened delicatessens, bakeries and restaurants, and introduced dishes like varenyky, krakowski, poppy seed roll, kluski, kolaches and stuffed cabbage rolls to the Midwest. German immigrants brought kohlrabi with them. Slovenian and Croatian immigrants brought the honey-nut bread called potica to the Iron Range region, which English immigrants brought Cornish pasties to. Porketta, a pork roast seasoned with fennel and garlic and served with either sliced or shredded like a pulled pork sandwich was brought to Minnesota and the Iron Range region by Italian immigrants.

Minnesota's Black diaspora is the most diverse in the United States. New halal butchers and African restaurants opened in Minneapolis after tens of thousands of African Americans arrived in Minnesota from other cities in the 1990s. The Safari Express is a Somali cuisine fast food spot that serves camel burgers and fries. Halal Hotdogs is a not-for-profit providing employment and job training to new immigrants.

=== Missouri ===
In Missouri, much of the cuisine is influenced by the environment as well as the heritage of early settlers to the state.

In the Ozarks, country ham, fried chicken, catfish, and frog legs are popular entrée choices, commonly served with fried potatoes, baked beans and biscuits.

Springfield style cashew chicken is a dish served at most Chinese restaurants in the Ozarks.

Mid-Missouri and Northern Missourians eat a lot of beef (steaks, hamburgers, meatloaf, and roasts) and pork (steak, roasts, chops, and BBQ); sides often include potatoes (baked, mashed, cheesy, fried) and green vegetables (green beans, asparagus, zucchini).

Barbecue, mainly pork and beef, is popular in both St. Louis and Kansas City, as well as in much of the southern half of the state.

In Southern Missouri, sweet tea is commonly available at restaurants, while in Northern Missouri most citizens prefer unsweetened tea. Missourians also enjoy beer and bacon, with many businesses specializing in these Missouri staples.

St. Louis features toasted ravioli, St. Louis-style pizza, and gooey butter cake. Kansas City is known for their K.C.-style BBQ-sauced burnt ends.

Another region; the Missouri Rhineland, located along the valley of the Missouri River, is known for its wineries. Missourians enjoy regional wines and often eat summer sausage, cheese, and crackers while enjoying.

Fishing is popular throughout the state, and fish fries are regular social events. They often feature catfish, largemouth bass, and crappie. Fried potatoes, morel mushrooms (when in season), and onion rings are commonly fried as well at these social gatherings.

For breakfast, Missourians enjoy bacon, country ham, breakfast sausage with eggs, hash browns, and toast or biscuits. Biscuits and gravy, and pancakes are also some favorites.

=== Nebraska ===
A significant population of Germans from Russia settled in Nebraska, leading to one of the state's most iconic dishes, the runza sandwich.

Large numbers of Czech immigrants, especially in southeastern Nebraska, influenced the culture and cuisine of the area. Wilber, Nebraska, is the self-designated Czech capital of the US and celebrates an annual Czech Days festival at which Czech food, such as kolaches, roast duck, and pork and dumplings, is served.

In 2015, Nebraska resettled the largest number of refugees per capita in the United States, and Lincoln, Nebraska, has been a significant resettlement location for refugees since the 1980s, particularly Vietnamese-Americans.

A large Vietnamese-American population in Lincoln has created Vietnamese markets—which sell ingredients, such as fresh persimmon, not typically found in Midwestern grocery store chains—and Vietnamese restaurants which sell foods such as pho and bánh mì.

Nebraska is also known as the Cornhusker State in reference to the abundance of corn grown in the state. Corn is a common part of late-summer and autumnal meals in Nebraska in dishes such as corn souffle, corn chowder, cornbread, and corn on the cob. Early pioneers relied heavily on corn and cornmeal in everything from breads, (cornbread, corn mush rolls), to soups, (corn soup, Indian meal mush), and desserts, (green corn pudding, popcorn pudding, sweet corn cake).

The cheese frenchee, a deep-fried cheese sandwich, was invented in Lincoln, Nebraska, at a King's Food Host Restaurant in the 1950s. It went on to become a regional favorite.

=== North Dakota ===
Cuisine in North Dakota has been heavily influenced by both Norwegians and Germans from Russia, ethnic groups that have historically accounted for a large portion of North Dakota's population. Norwegian contributions to the state include lefse, lutefisk, krumkake, and rosettes.

Much of the Norwegian-influenced cuisine is also common in Minnesota and other states where Norwegians and their descendants lived, although it may be the greater in North Dakota than any other state.

Norwegians played a large role in settling the area, and nearly one-third of North Dakotans claim Norwegian ancestry. Norwegian ancestry was historically more widespread throughout the northern half and eastern third of North Dakota, and therefore plays a stronger role in local cuisine in those parts of the state.

German-Russian cuisine is primarily influenced by that of the Schwarzmeerdeutsche, or Black Sea Germans, who heavily populated south-central and southwestern North Dakota (an area known as the German-Russian Triangle), as well as areas of South Dakota.

While large numbers of Wolgadeutsche, Germans from Russia who lived near the Volga River in Russia (several hundred miles away from the Black Sea), also settled in the United States, they did not settle in large numbers in the Dakotas.

Popular German-Russian cuisine includes kuchen, a thin, cheesecake-like custard pastry often filled with fruit such as cherries, apricot, prunes, and sometimes cottage cheese.

Fleischkuekle (or fleischkuechle) is a popular meat-filled thin flatbread that is deep-fried and served hot. Another German-Russian specialty in the area is knoephla, a dumpling soup that almost always includes potatoes, and to a lesser extent, celery.

=== Ohio ===
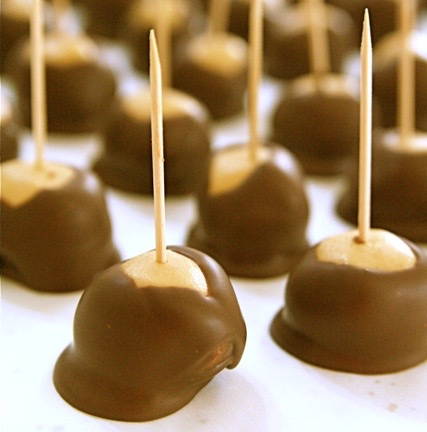
Buckeye candy

Buckeye candy is a confection popular in the state of Ohio; it is the local variation of a peanut butter cup. Coated in chocolate, with a partially exposed center of peanut butter fudge, in appearance the candy resembles the chestnut that grows on the state tree, commonly known as the Buckeye.

Cincinnati-style chili is a Greek-inspired meat sauce, (ground beef seasoned with cinnamon, nutmeg, allspice, cloves, bay leaf, cumin, chili powder, and in some home recipes, chocolate), used as a topping for spaghetti or hot dogs. Additionally, red beans, chopped onions, and shredded cheese are offered as extra toppings referred to as "ways".

Goetta is a German-inspired meat-and-grain sausage that is mainly popular in Cincinnati. It is primarily composed of ground meat, steel-cut oats, and spices. There is an annual Goetta Festival held in Newport, Kentucky.

A local specialty of Ohio are sauerkraut balls, meatball-sized fritter containing sauerkraut and some combination of ham, bacon, and pork. The recipe was invented in the late 1950s by two brothers, Max and Roman Gruber for their five-star restaurant, Gruber's, located in Shaker Heights, Ohio. These were a derivative of the various ethnic cultures of Northeast Ohio, which includes Akron and Greater Cleveland.

An annual Sauerkraut Festival is held in Waynesville, Ohio. at which sauerkraut balls, along with other sauerkraut specialities, are served.

Clam bakes are very popular in Northeast Ohio. The region, which was originally part of the Connecticut Western Reserve, was initially settled by people from Connecticut and other New England states. A typical Northeast Ohio clam bake typically includes clams, chicken, sweet potatoes, corn, and other side dishes. Unlike in New England, seaweed is not used and the clams, chicken, and sweet potatoes are all steamed together in a large pot.

Barberton, Ohio, part of the greater Akron area, is a small industrial city and home of Barberton Chicken, a dish of chicken deep fried in lard that was created by Serbian immigrants. It is usually accompanied by a hot rice dish, vinegar coleslaw and french fries.

=== South Dakota ===
Rocky Mountain oysters, a dish made from bull testicles, are one of the most notable dishes from South Dakota. Another dish is known as bierock, which is similar to meat-pie dishes of Central and Eastern Europe. Though treated as a novelty, fried chicken gizzards can be found served at some restaurants.

Much of South Dakotan cuisine mirrors the influence of European immigrants, especially of Norwegian and German cultures, like those of nearby states. It is estimated that at least 40% of South Dakotans have German ancestry, and at least 15% Norwegian. In particular, the towns East River represent stronger cultural ties to German and Norwegian immigrants. Additionally, South Dakota has a high proportion of some immigrant Anabaptist groups, notably Mennonites and Hutterites, which contribute to the cuisine.

The official state dessert of South Dakota is kuchen, which has its origins as a class of German cake- and pie-like desserts. The typical South Dakota kuchen has a custard base and usually contains fruit like peaches or berries. Some communities and families in South Dakota celebrate their German heritage (especially Germans from Russia) with a schmeckfest (lit. 'tasting-festival'). One annual schmeckfest which has become famous is in the town of Freeman, South Dakota, which draws over 5,000 visitors. Among families of Norwegian descent, foods like lefse, lutefisk and krumkake are popular around Christmastime, as they are in North Dakota and Minnesota.

Another significant cultural heritage in South Dakota is the Sioux, especially in the western part of the state, and some traditional Native American dishes have become popular, like wojapi, a berry sauce from the Lakota. Wojapi sometimes accompanies frybread, which is associated with another dish called Navajo or Indian tacos, which is frybread topped with meat such as ground beef and other taco toppings. Other foods local to the state which have provided food to tribes for thousands of years include bison, now popularly served as burgers in towns like Custer and Oacoma, and chokecherries, which grow wild both on the plains and in the Black Hills and are used to make jellies and wine.

Hunting provides food for numerous families in the state. The state bird, the Chinese Ring-Necked Pheasant, is the only state bird in the USA which is hunted, and pheasant meat is popular across South Dakota. The town of Aberdeen, in the northeast part of the state, is famous for pheasant meat sandwiches. It is also common to find South Dakotans dining on venison, pronghorn, or various freshwater fishes local to the state, such as walleye and northern pike.

=== Wisconsin ===
Wisconsin is "America's Dairyland," and is home to numerous frozen custard stands, particularly around Milwaukee and along the Lake Michigan corridor. The state also has a special relationship with Blue Moon ice cream, being one of the only places the flavor can be found. While the flavor's origins are not well documented, it was most likely developed by flavor chemist Bill "Doc" Sidon of Milwaukee, Wisconsin. The state is also well known as a home to many cheesemakers. Colby cheese was created here in 1885.

Arguably the most universal Wisconsin dessert would be the cream puff, a type of profiterole that is a famous treat at the Wisconsin State Fair. The southeastern Wisconsin city of Racine is known for its Danish kringle, a sweet flaky pastry often served as a dessert.

The Friday night fish fry, often battered and fried perch or walleye, is traditional throughout Wisconsin, while in northeast Wisconsin along Lake Michigan, the Door County fish boil holds sway.

Besides its "Cheesehead" status, Wisconsin has a reputation for alcohol consumption. Common traits of "drinking culture" are embedded in Wisconsin traditions, from festivals and holidays to everyday life. Many large breweries were founded in Wisconsin, largely in Milwaukee, which gained the epithet "Brew City" before the turn of the century: Miller, Pabst, Schlitz (all from and originally based in Milwaukee) and Leinenkugel all began as local favorites before entering the national and international markets.

Booyah is another common and hearty Wisconsin meal, brought to Wisconsin by Walloon immigrants, and found especially in the Northeast region of the state. The origins of this dish are disputed, but the Wisconsin origin contends that the word is a vernacular Flemish or Walloon Belgian spelling of the French word bouillon, in this context meaning 'broth'.

Wisconsin cuisine also features a large amount of sausage, or wurst. The state is also a major producer and consumer of summer sausage, as well as the nation's top producer and consumer of brats.

== Restaurants and pubs ==
Dark ales have been consumed in America since Colonial times, while light-colored German lager was a mid-19th-century arrival. The beer hall did not become established in the United States until the arrival of German immigrants in the mid-19th century. Taverns were generally seen as rough places with an exclusively male clientele.

The beer hall, on the other hand, was in German culture views as a place where working-class families drank and ate together in groups at large tables. It was well-lit and served traditional fare like sausages, sauerbraten, rollmops, sauerkraut and pickled herring. Beer halls continued in the Midwest after Prohibition. German potato salad and the potato dumplings commonly served in local pubs in present times.

The origin of "fast food" is uncertain, but one possibility is a hamburger stand that was founded by Walter Anderson in Wichita, Kansas. Known today as White Castle, the fast-food chain began to spread throughout the Midwest, offering a simple menu with hamburgers, Coca-Cola and coffee. By the 1920s White Castle had become a nationally recognized chain, and until the 1940s White Castle-style architecture was standard for fast-food hamburger outlets throughout the United States. Other local burger chains include Winstead's, Max & Erma's and Schoop's Hamburgers.

Cities like New York did not want fast food to compete with local establishments, but the expansion of suburbs in the 1950s allowed fast-food franchises to grow into areas that lacked restaurants. The popularity of Midwestern fast food like the iconic pizza and burgers started as a rejection of the drive-in model. Carhops were replaced by the franchise model, including McDonald's, Wendy's, Domino's and Pizza Hut. (McDonald's was originally founded in California in 1940, but purchased by Ray Kroc and moved to Des Plaines, Illinois, in 1955.) The growth of these franchises was bolstered by the development of interstate roads through the Midwest.

Several restaurant chains have roots in the Minneapolis–St. Paul area, including Famous Dave's, the now defunct Chi-Chi's, and Buca di Beppo, which was started out of a small Minneapolis basement in 1993. Portillo's Restaurants is another Midwestern fast-food chain known for its hot dogs. Lion's Choice is best known for its roast beef sandwiches. The chain is based mostly in Missouri, with locations in Kansas and Illinois. Wisconsin chain Culver's is known for its frozen custard and root beer. Culver's has been recognized for their use of local dairy products like cheese and butter. Happy Joe's is known for its taco pizza and has restaurants in several Midwestern states. Other notable chains include Harold's Chicken Shack, Skyline Chili, Spangles, Big John Steak & Onion, Graeter's, Maid-Rite and Cousins Subs.

Pizzerias serving deep-dish pizza include Gino's East, Giordano's Pizzeria and Buddy's Pizza, though the latter only has stores in Michigan. Papa John's started by selling pizzas out of a Jeffersonville, Indiana pub.

== Dishes ==
Ingredients commonly used in the Midwestern states include beef, pork, potatoes and corn. While not all exclusive to the Midwest, these dishes are typical of Midwestern foods, and often feature uniquely Midwestern preparation styles.

- 7-layer dip
- Apple pie
- Barbecue
- Beans
- Beef, especially steak, pot roast and prime rib
- Bread-and-butter pickles
- Beer
- Beer cheese soup
- Biscuits
- Biscuits and gravy
- Brandy
- Bratwurst
- Buckeyes
- Bumpy cake
- Butter cake
- Cabbage
- Cabbage roll, also known as stuffed cabbage
- City Chicken, commonly used: fried pork or veal on wood skewers native to Ohio
- Cheese, including cheese curds
- Chicken Vesuvio
- Chicken paprikash
- Chislic
- Cole slaw
- Coney Island hot dog
- Cornbread
- Deep-fried bacon
- Diner fare
- Door County fish boil
- Doughnuts
- Duck
- Graham bread
- Freshwater fish, including catfish, perch, trout, walleye and whitefish and other panfish, often breaded and fried
- Fried chicken
- Frozen custard
- Fruit, especially apples, blueberries, cherries, cranberries, peaches and strawberries
- Fruit wines
- Fruit pies
- German potato salad
- Goulash
- Hamburgers
- Head cheese
- Horseshoe sandwich
- Hotdish or casseroles
- Ice cream cone
- Italian beef
- Jello salads
- Johnny cake
- Johnny Marzetti
- Lefse
- Lutefisk
- Maple syrup
- Meatloaf
- Morels
- Pancakes
- Pasties
- Pea salad
- Persimmon pudding
- Pierogi
- Pigs in a blanket
- Pizza, with several regional styles
- Pork
- Potatoes, including mashed potatoes, potato pancakes, and potato salads
- Ranch dressing
- Ramps
- Roast beef
- Sauerbraten
- Sauerkraut
- Sausage, including bratwurst, kielbasa, summer sausage, ring bologna, and other ethnic types, as well as hot dogs, with several regional styles
- Shrimp DeJonghe
- Sponge cake
- Steak
- Stollen
- Sugar cream pie
- Sweet corn, on-the-cob, in creamed corn and in corn relish
- Turkey
- Wild rice

== See also ==
- List of regional dishes of the United States
