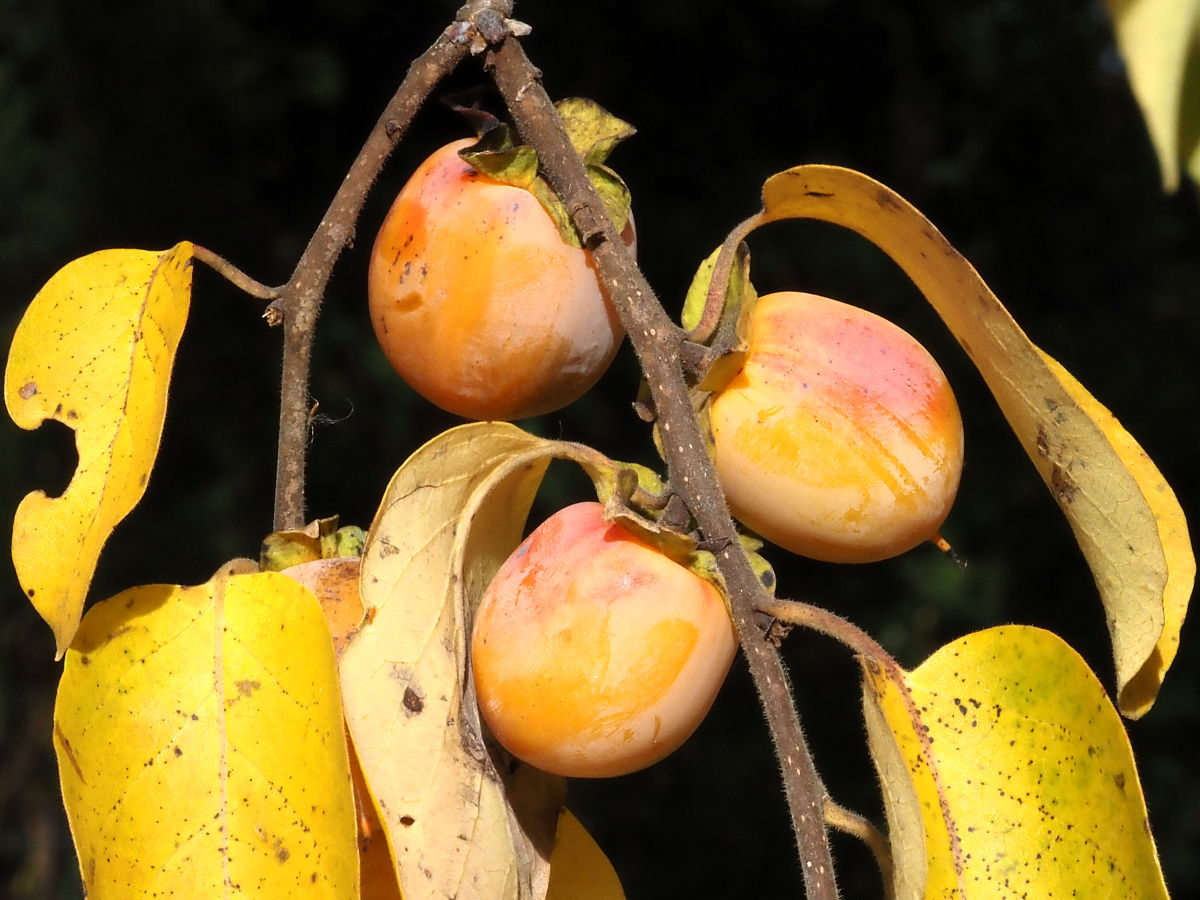
- Ripe fruit
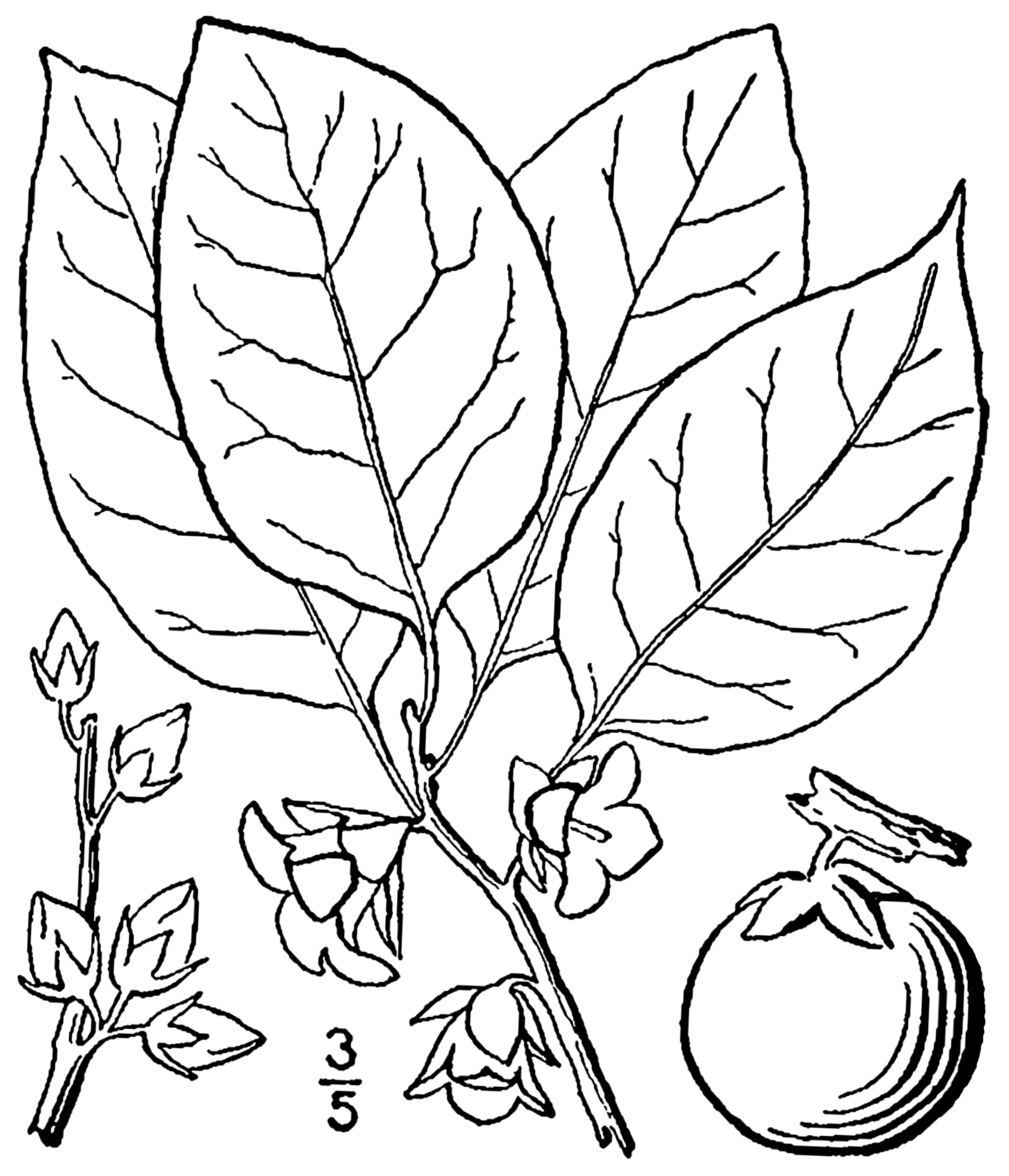
- Botanical illustration

Conservation status
- Secure (NatureServe)

- Least Concern (IUCN 3.1)

Scientific classification
- Kingdom: Plantae
- Clade: Tracheophytes
- Clade: Angiosperms
- Clade: Eudicots
- Clade: Asterids
- Order: Ericales
- Family: Ebenaceae
- Genus: Diospyros
- Species: D. virginiana

Binomial name
- Diospyros virginiana L.
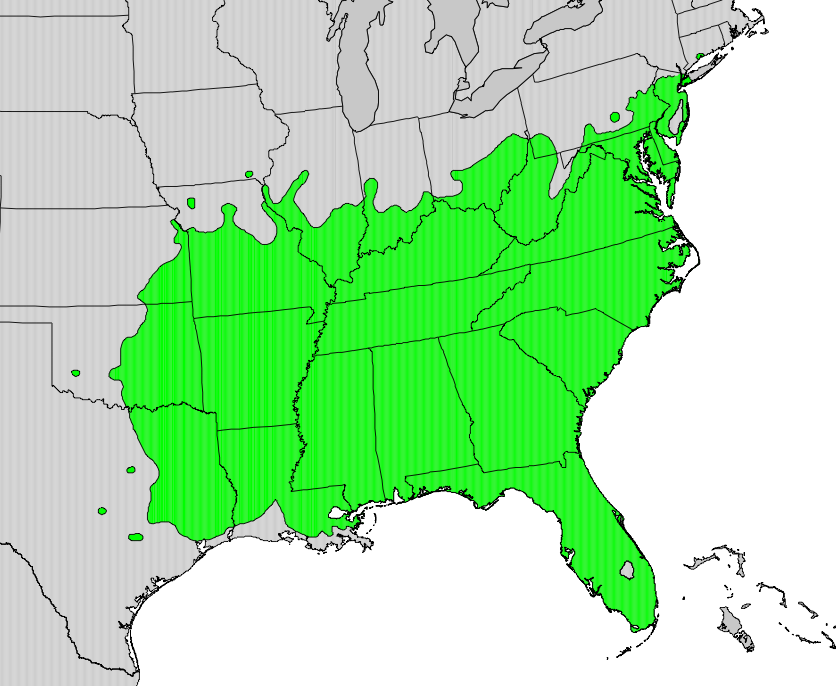
- Distribution map of the American persimmon

Synonyms
- Diospyros mosieri S.F.Blake

= Diospyros virginiana =

Species of tree

Diospyros virginiana is a persimmon species commonly called the American persimmon, common persimmon, eastern persimmon, simmon, possumwood, possum apples, or sugar plum. The tree is typically dioecious, so one must have both male and female plants to obtain fruit.

It ranges from southern Connecticut to Florida, and west to Texas, Louisiana, Oklahoma, Kansas, and Iowa. The tree grows in the wild but has been cultivated for its fruit and wood since prehistoric times by Native Americans. Both the tree and the fruit are referred to as persimmons, with the latter appearing in desserts and cuisine in the U.S. South and Midwest.

Commercial varieties include the very productive Early Golden, the productive John Rick, Miller, Woolbright and the Ennis, a seedless variety. Another nickname of the American persimmon, 'date-plum' also refers to a persimmon species found in South Asia and South Europe, Diospyros lotus.

== Description ==
The common persimmon is a generally small to medium sized tree, usually 30 to 80 feet (9 to 24 m) in height, but reaching 115 feet (35 m) west of the southern Mississippi. The roots are thick, fleshy, and stoloniferous. It has a short, slender trunk and spreading, often pendulous branches, which form a broad or narrow, round-topped canopy. The species has a shrubby growth form.

The bark is dark brown or dark gray, deeply divided into plates whose surface is scaly. The branchlets are slender, zigzagging, with thick pith or large pith cavity; at first light reddish brown and pubescent. They vary in color from light brown to ashy gray and finally become reddish brown, the bark somewhat broken by longitudinal fissures. Astringent and bitter.

The wood is very dark; sapwood yellowish white; heavy, hard, strong and very close grained. Specific gravity, 0.7908; weight of cubic foot, 49.28 lb (22.35 kg). The heartwood is a true ebony. Forestry texts indicate that about a century of growth is required before a tree will produce a commercially viable yield of ebony wood. The termite resistance of the wood is attributed to the component 7-methlyjuglone.

The plant has oval entire leaves on short stalks. They are alternate, simple, four to six inches (152 mm) long, narrowed or rounded or cordate at base, entire, acute or acuminate. They come out of the bud revolute, thin, pale, reddish green, downy with ciliate margins, when full grown are thick, dark green, shining above, pale and often pubescent beneath. In autumn they sometimes turn orange or scarlet, sometimes fall without change of color. Midrib broad and flat, primary veins opposite and conspicuous. Petioles stout, pubescent, one-half to an inch in length.

Winter buds: Ovate, acute, one-eighth of an inch long, covered with thick reddish or purple scales. These scales are sometimes persistent at the base of the branchlets. The flowers bloom from May to June, when the leaves are half-grown. They are dioecious (unisexual) or rarely polygamous.

Staminate flowers are numerous, borne in two to three-flowered cymes; the pedicels downy and bearing two minute bracts. Sixteen stamens, inserted on the corolla, in pairs (forming two rows). Filaments short, slender, slightly hairy; anthers oblong, introrse, two-celled, cells opening longitudinally.

In pistillate flowers, the stamens are eight with aborted anthers, rarely these stamens are perfect. Pistillate flowers solitary, usually on separate trees, their pedicels short, recurved, and bearing two bractlets. The corolla is greenish yellow or creamy white, tubular, four-lobed; lobes imbricate in bud. A smooth ovary has one ovule in each of the eight cells—the ovary is surmounted by four styles, which are hairy at the base. Ovary superior, conical; slender, spreading; stigma two-lobed.

The fruit-stalk is very short, bearing a subglobose fruit an inch in diameter or a bit larger, of an orange-yellow color, ranging to bluish, and with a sweetish astringent pulp. It is surrounded at the base by the persistent calyx lobes, which increase in size as the fruit ripens. The calyx is usually four-lobed, accrescent under the fruit.

A juicy berry containing one to eight seeds, crowned with the remnants of the style and seated in the enlarged calyx; depressed-globular, pale orange color, often red-cheeked; with slight bloom, turning yellowish brown after freezing. The fruit is round or oval and usually orange-yellow, sometimes bluish, and from 2 to 6 cm (3/4 to 2 1/4 in) in diameter. Most cultivars are parthenocarpic (setting seedless fruit without pollination). Fruiting typically begins when the tree is about 6 years old. The flesh is astringent while green, and sweet and luscious when ripe. The astringency renders the fruit somewhat unpalatable, but its flavor improves after it has been subjected to the action of frost, or has become partially rotted or "bletted" like a medlar.

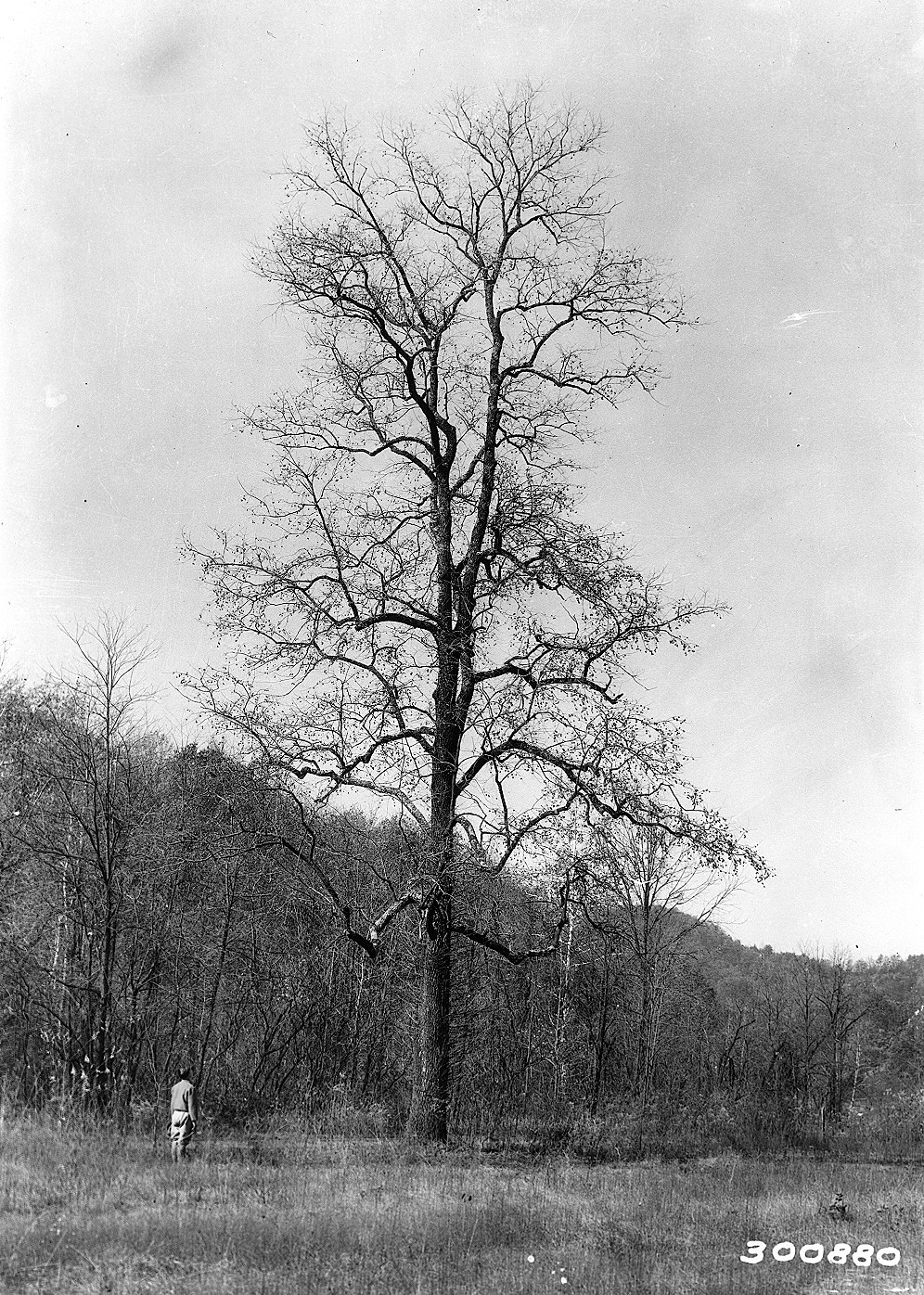
A large tree in Indiana, 1935

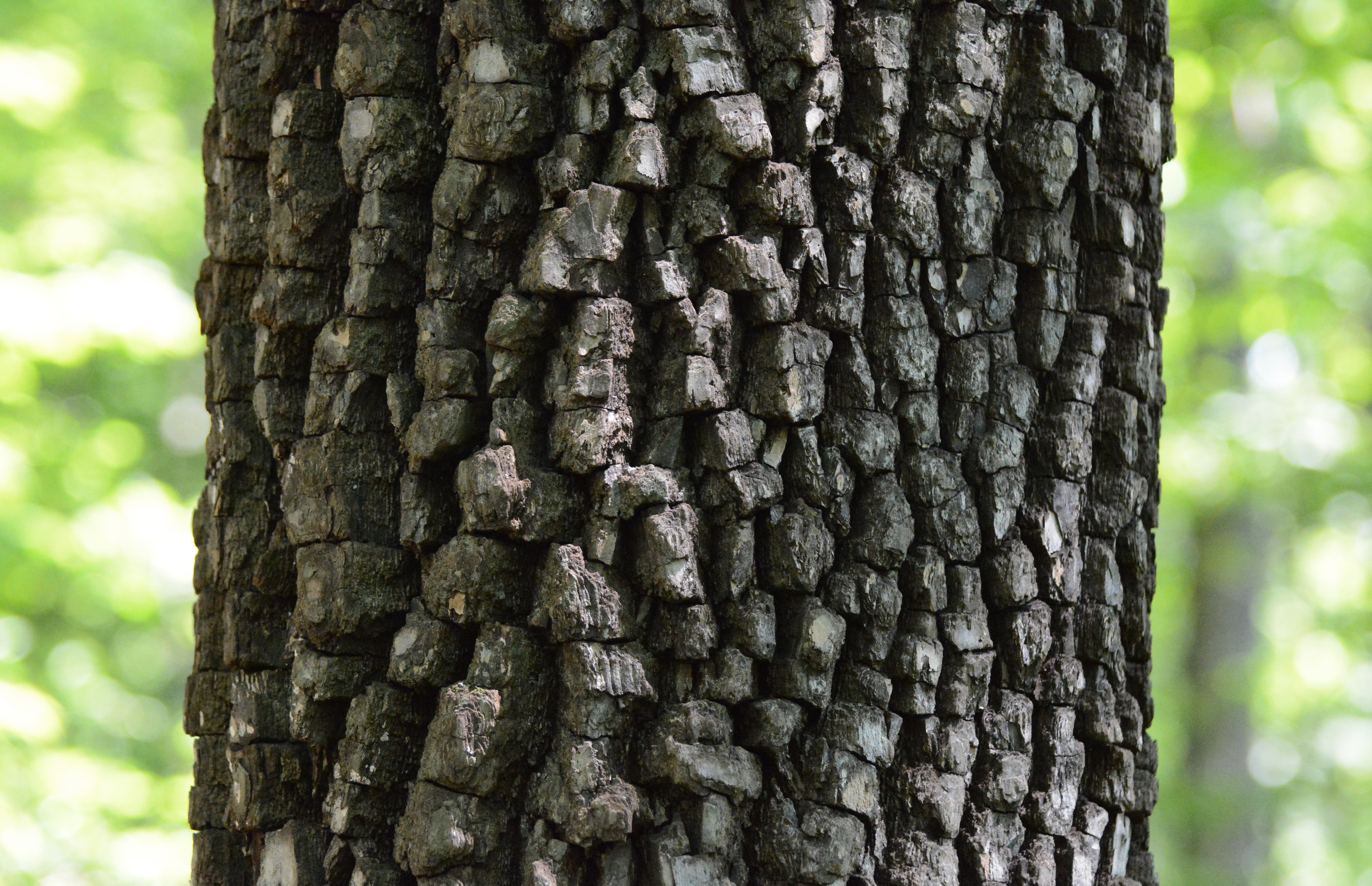
Distinctive coruscated, heavily scaled bark

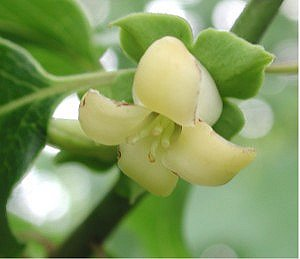
Flowers appear from May to June.

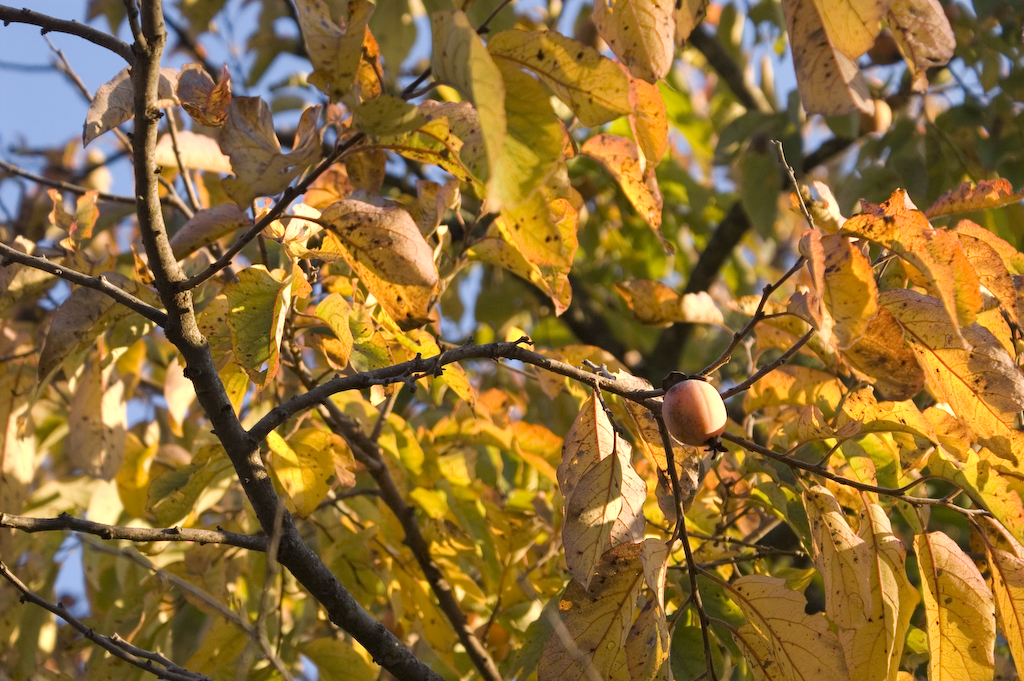
American persimmon tree bearing fruit in the fall

== Ploidy ==
There are two races of American persimmon: the tetraploid (60-chromosome) race is centered in the southern Appalachian region, while the hexaploid (90-chromosome) race generally occupies a range north and west of the tetraploid range. The boundary between these races has not been well defined except in Kentucky, where hexaploid persimmons were in the majority in Bullitt County but were not present in Barren County to its south nor Franklin County to its east.

It has been observed that the tetraploid trees tend to grow much taller than the hexaploid trees and have smaller fruit, but no formal research has been done into these differences of traits.

The vast majority of named American Persimmon cultivars are hexaploid, with the only known tetraploid cultivars being Ennis Seedless, Weeping, Sugar Bear, and SFES.

== Distribution ==
The tree is very common in the South Atlantic and Gulf states, and attains its largest size in the basin of the Mississippi River. Its habitat is southern, at the turn of the 20th century it appeared along the coast from Connecticut to Florida; west of the Alleghenies it is found in southern Ohio and along through southeastern Iowa and southern Missouri; and in Louisiana, eastern Kansas and Oklahoma, where it grew tallest.

Its fossil remains have been found in Miocene rocks of Greenland and Alaska and in Cretaceous formations in Nebraska.

Diospyros virginiana is considered to be an evolutionary anachronism that was consumed by one or more of the Pleistocene megafauna that roamed the North American continent until 10,000 years ago. A 2015 study found that passage of persimmon seeds through the gut of modern elephants increased the rate of seed germination and decreased time to sprouting, which supports the idea that Pleistocene members of the elephant family were the ghost partner who accomplished seed dispersal prior to extinction of the North American members of the elephant family.

== Ecology ==
The fragrant flowers are pollinated by insects and wind.

== Cultivation ==
The American persimmon mostly grows wild. Experimental research stations in the 1890s tested native varieties of persimmon, but interest in cultivation of the native persimmon has been limited. Newly planted persimmon trees take a relatively long time to bear fruit. There are many sorts of fruit trees that are easier to grow for commercial purposes. Wild varieties contain a lot of seeds, making the processing of fruit pulp used in food and beverage manufacture more difficult. Cultivation has reduced the number of seeds, and some varieties have developed a very sweet flavor profile without the dreaded astringency of wild persimmon. Harvested fruits are shelf durable.

It was brought to England before 1629 and is cultivated, but rarely if ever ripens its fruit. It is easily raised from seed and can also be propagated from stolons, which are often produced in great quantity. The tree is hardy in the south of England and in the Channel Islands. The American persimmon was successfully hybridized with the kaki at Nikitsky Botanical Garden in 1948. The resulting plants show intermediate cold-hardiness and fruit size and are commonly cultivated.

Persimmons are now grown on small farms as a heritage crop. The tree prefers light, sandy, well-drained soil, but will grow in rich southern bottom lands. The tree is greatly inclined to vary in the character and quality of its fruit, which varies in size from that of a large cherry to a small apple. Some trees in the south produce fruit that is delicious without the action of the frost, while adjoining trees produce fruit that never becomes edible.

The persimmon rarely develops any heartwood until it is nearly one hundred years old.

=== Varieties ===
- Prok
- Killen
- Claypool
- I-115
- Dollywood
- 100-42
- 100-43
- 100-45
- Early Golden
- John Rick
- C-100

== Uses ==
The fruit is high in vitamin C, and extremely astringent when unripe. It is eaten by birds, raccoons, skunks, white-tailed deer, semi-wild hogs, flying squirrels, and opossums.

The ripe fruit may be eaten raw by humans, typically once bletted, or it can be cooked or dried. The fruit pulp can be made into pie, pudding, jam, molasses, and candy. An herbal tea can be made from the leaves and the roasted seed is used as a coffee substitute.

The fruit is also fermented with hops, cornmeal or wheat bran into a sort of beer or made into brandy.

The wood is heavy, strong and very close-grained and used in woodturning. Its heartwood, which may take a century before being produced, is a true ebony, extremely close-grained and almost black; it is not harvested commercially.

The seeds were used as buttons during the privation of the American Civil War in the South.
