= Persimmon pudding =

Dessert pudding made with persimmons

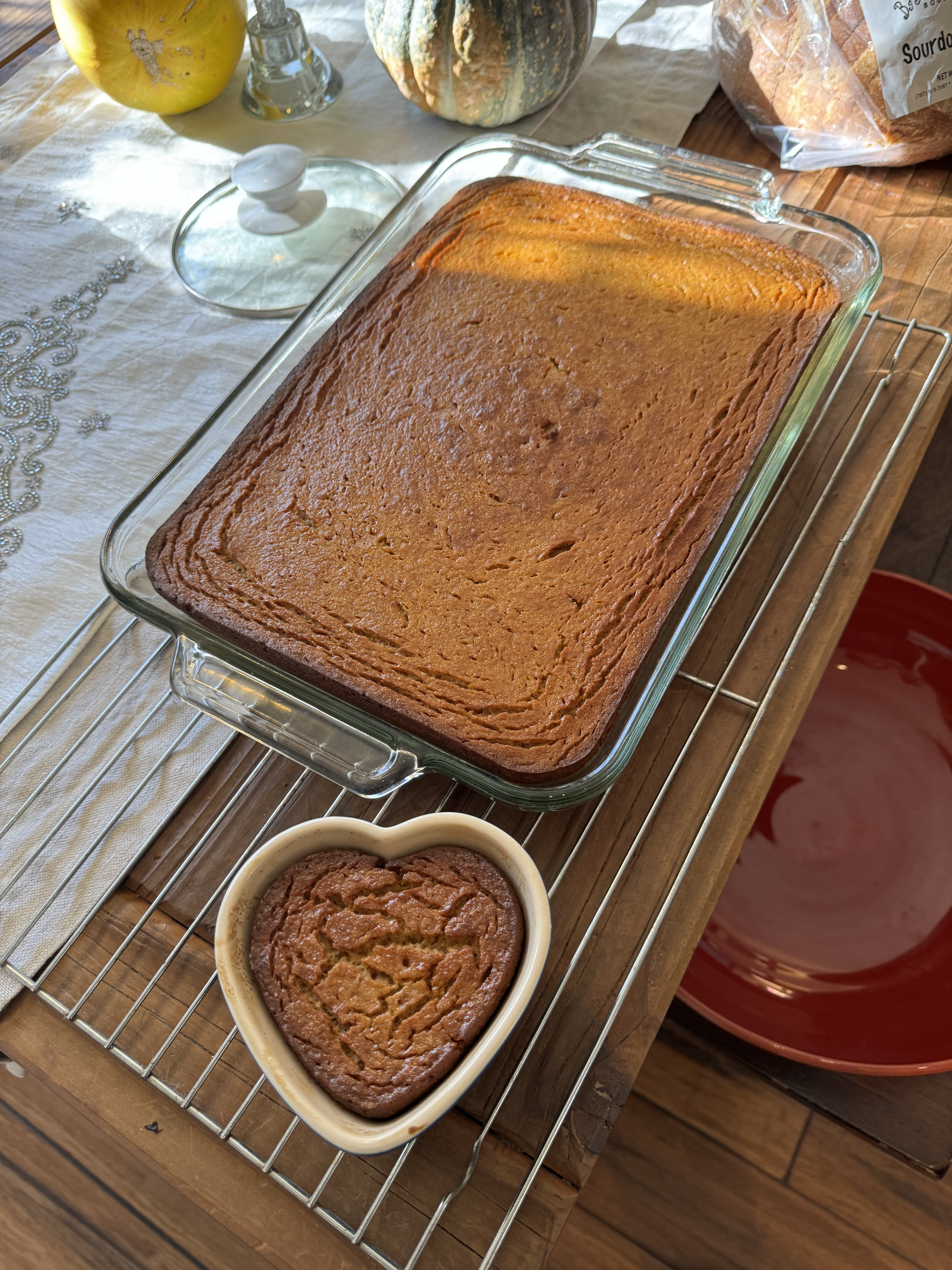
- Persimmon pudding fresh from the oven
- Type: Pudding
- Place of origin: United States
- Region or state: Midwest
- Main ingredients: Persimmon

Persimmon pudding is a dessert pudding made with persimmons. There is a lot of variety in the recipes, some are made with eggs, others add sweet potatoes or pumpkin. There's no set recipe, although common ingredients include some type of cornmeal or flour, brown sugar or molasses, and spices like cinnamon, nutmeg and ginger. Owing to the difficulty of preparing the pulp from wild American persimmons, persimmon pudding is mostly a regional specialty in the Midwestern United States.

A bain marie can be used to steam the pudding, but it is not necessary and the pudding can be baked at lower temperatures without using one. The recipe traditional to American cuisine is baked or steamed slowly over a long duration, with a little baking soda. The baking soda makes it easier for sugars and proteins to react with each other, altering the color and results in a darker, more flavorful pudding. Replacing the baking soda with baking powder, or shortening the cooking time will result in a lighter orange-colored pudding.

The texture of a classic American persimmon pudding is described as chewy, and similar to a dense gingerbread cake.

The pudding is often served with ice cream, crème anglaise, whipped cream, apple sauce, or hard sauce, which is sometimes called brandy sauce. It is traditionally served warm, though it can be served cold as well. Persimmon pudding lasts quite a while when refrigerated, and may be made in large batches to be served over the course of several days. As the pudding ages the various individual flavors mellow and blend.

Every year at the annual Persimmon Festival in Mitchell, Indiana, persimmon pudding is sold with ice cream. It is one of two iconic local dishes in Indiana, the other being sugar cream pie. It was the most searched for Thanksgiving recipe in the state in 2014.

== See also ==
- List of steamed foods
