= Desperation pie =

Thrifty pies from American cuisine

Desperation pies
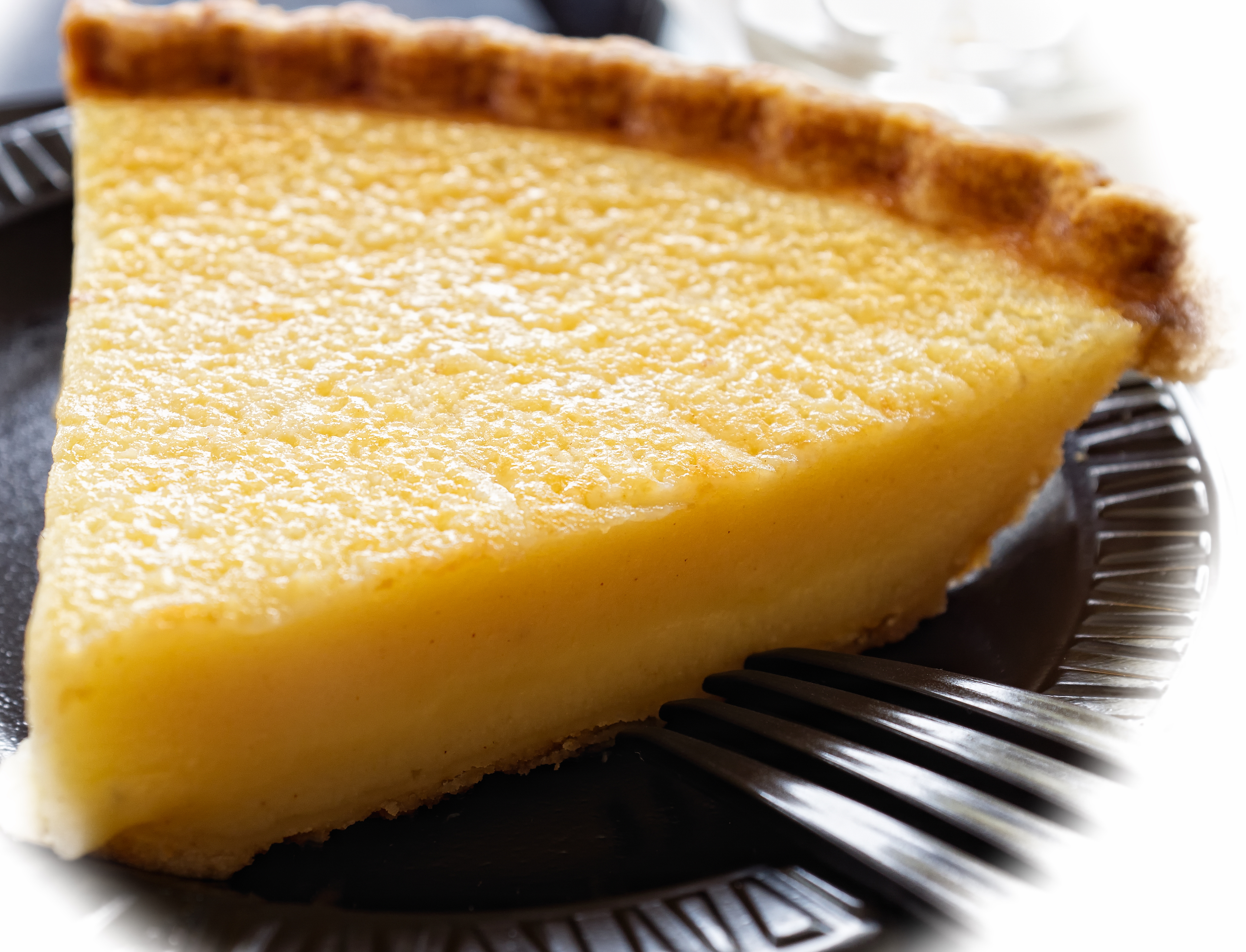
- Type: Pie
- Place of origin: United States

Desperation pies are pies in American cuisine made using staple ingredients like butter, sugar, eggs and flour, and making use of other ingredients that cooks had on hand to substitute for ingredients that were out of season or too expensive. These pies were more common before refrigeration and canned pie fillings, and during times of hardship like the Great Depression and rationing of World War II.

== History ==
Before refrigeration, homemakers could only cook with ingredients that were in season or that were preserved or stored, and so could not make fruit pies, like peach pie, when the fruits were not available or prices too high. Green tomato pie was commonly made as a mock apple pie or mock mincemeat pie in the 19th century.

== Types ==
Examples include:

- Buttermilk pie
- Chess pie
- Mock apple pie, which used crackers or other inexpensive, available ingredients in lieu of apples
- Shoofly pie
- Sugar cream pie
- Sorghum pie
- Vinegar pie, which evolved in the cuisine of the Midwestern United States as a substitute for lemons, to balance the sweetness of custard pie filling
- Transparent pie
- Water pie
