= Beef Manhattan =

Dish of roast beef and gravy

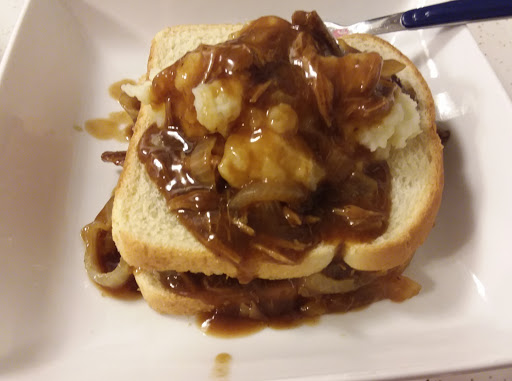
- Course: Main course
- Place of origin: United States
- Region or state: Midwest, South
- Serving temperature: Hot
- Main ingredients: Beef

Beef Manhattan is a Midwestern American dish consisting of roast beef and gravy. It is often served with mashed potatoes either on top of the steak or on the side. A variation on this dish is Turkey Manhattan, which substitutes turkey for the roast beef. The dish is named after Manhattan.

The dish was first served in a restaurant under the name "Beef Manhattan" in a now-defunct Indianapolis deli in the late 1940s where it gained traction as a Hoosier staple. The dish was named by Naval Ordnance Plant, Indianapolis (NOPI) workers who were trained on a fabrication of the Norden bombsight in Manhattan during World War II. They enjoyed the open-faced sandwich they had in Manhattan and brought it back to their cafeteria as the "Beef Manhattan." In Indiana, it is served on bread. The roast beef is sliced and put on the bread like a sandwich, then cut corner to corner and plated in a V shape. Mashed potatoes are served between the two halves, and the whole is covered in gravy.

== See also ==
- List of beef dishes
