= Sugar cream pie =

Dessert

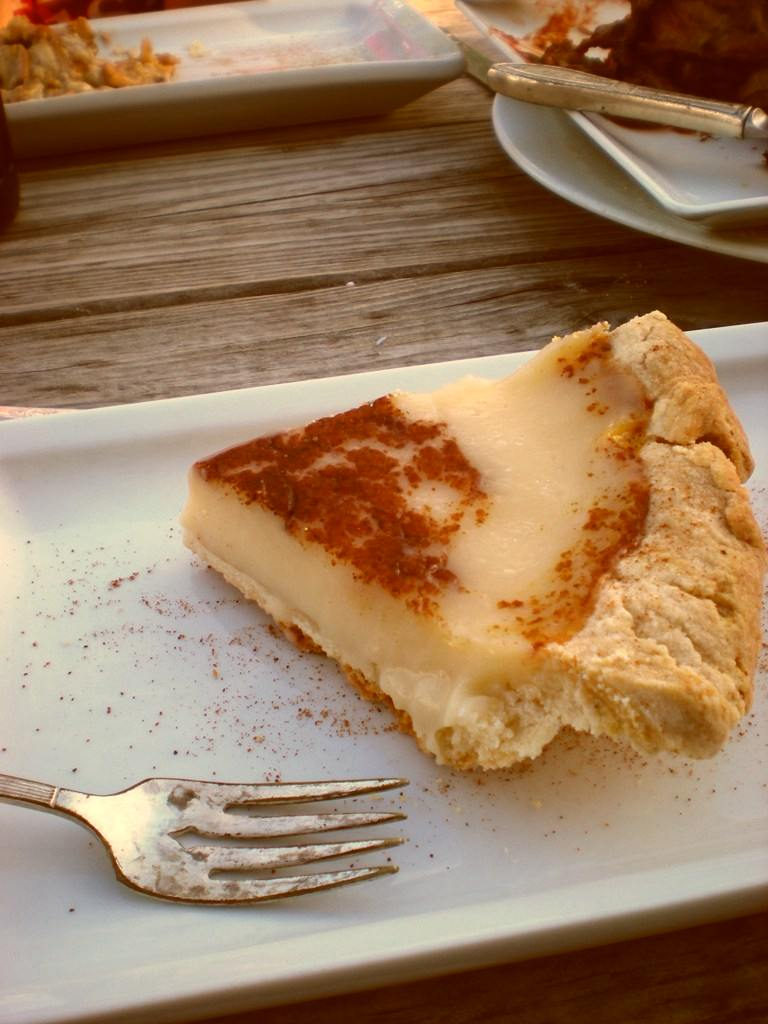
- A slice of sugar cream pie
- Alternative names: Sugar pie, Hoosier pie
- Type: Pie
- Place of origin: United States
- Region or state: Indiana
- Main ingredients: Sugar, cream, cornstarch, cinnamon, nutmeg

Sugar cream pie (also known as sugar pie or Hoosier pie) is a custard pie made with a simple filling of cream, sugar and cornstarch. The pie has been made in Indiana since the state's founding in 1816. There is a general consensus that a "true" sugar cream pie doesn't include eggs. It is sometimes called a desperation pie because it is one of the easiest pies to make with ingredients that most people already have in their pantries, and because the lack of eggs or butter in the recipe makes it cheap.

== History ==
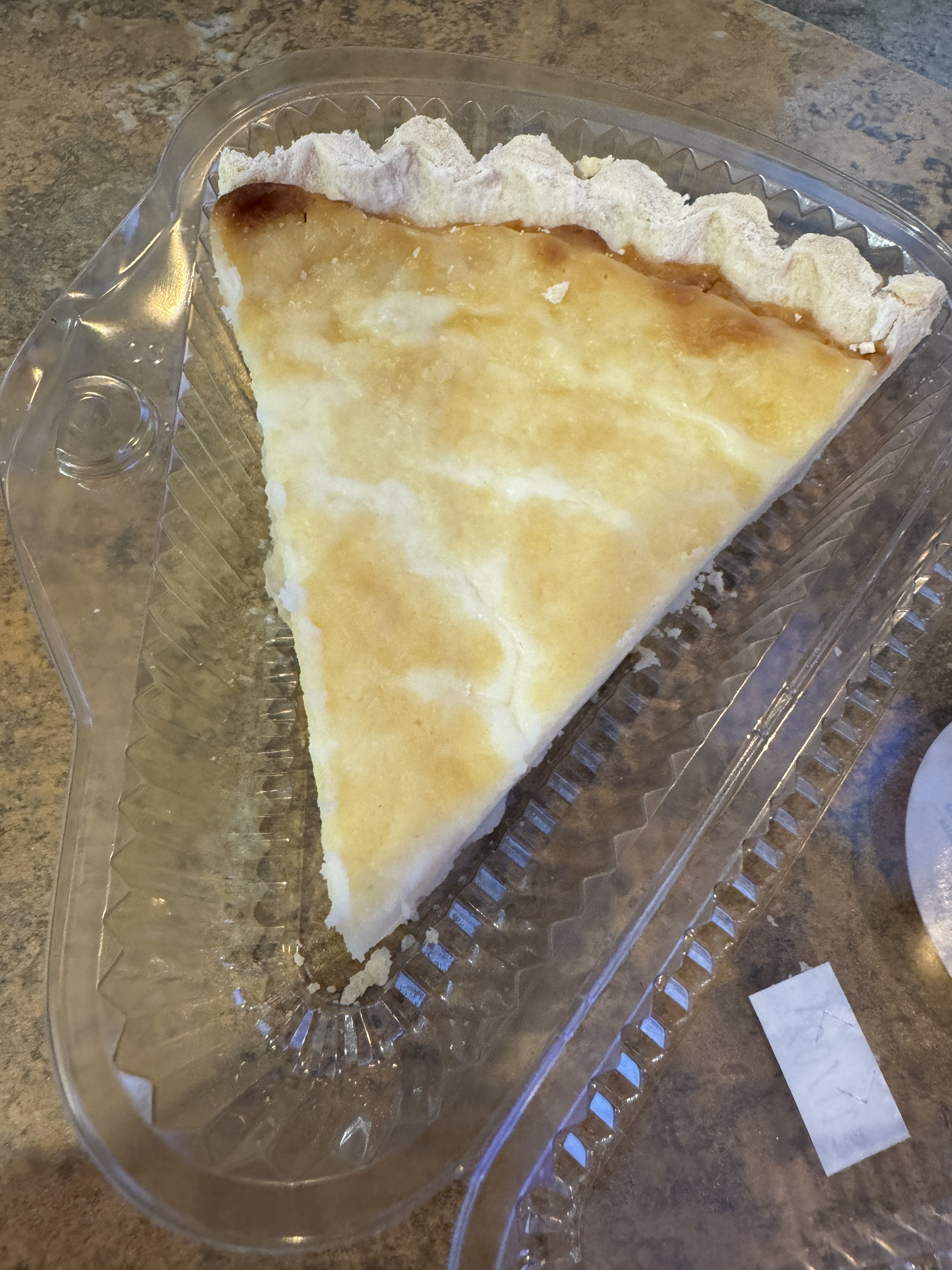
A pre-packaged slice of sugar cream pie in Indianapolis, Indiana.

Sugar cream pie is unofficially recognized as the state pie of Indiana, where it is believed to have originated with Quaker settlers who came from North Carolina in the early 19th century, and thereafter settled in East Central Indiana, particularly around the cities of New Castle, Portland, Richmond, and Winchester. As the Shakers had to abandon their community of West Union (Busro) (near modern-day Vincennes, Indiana) in 1827, their only presence in Indiana ever (1810–1827), it is unlikely that they made the dessert popular in the state.

== Variations ==
The only agreed upon aspect of the recipe is that it contains sugar.

There are many different ways of making the filling to create different textures. The texture is both chewy and creamy, with many possible variations. Some recipes begin by whisking butter and flour until the roux becomes shiny and smooth. Sugar and cream are added afterwards, and the filling is heated to a light boil. Sometimes starch and other ingredients are whisked into cold milk and heated in one step. The filling, however it is prepared, is sprinkled with cinnamon and nutmeg, and baked for a short time at a high temperature, then chilled.

Eggs are sometimes used instead of starch, but this is contentious. Most connoisseurs agree that a true sugar cream pie does not include eggs.

== See also ==
- List of Indiana state symbols
- List of pies, tarts and flans
- American cuisine
- Traditional food
- Pie dough
- Pastel de nata
- Persimmon pudding
- Water pie
