= Chicken Vesuvio =

Italian-American dish popular in Chicago

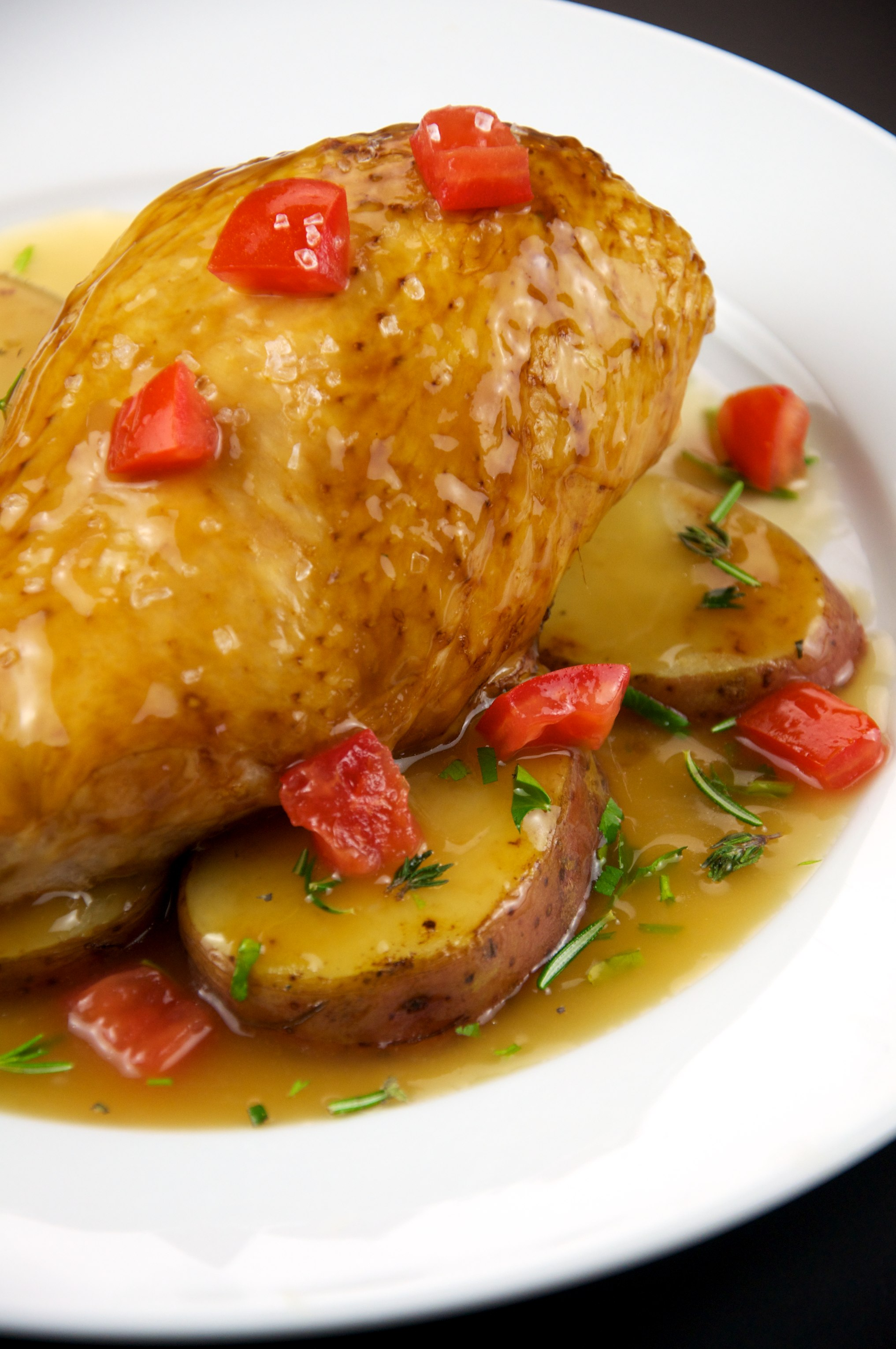
Chicken Vesuvio

Chicken Vesuvio, a specialty of Chicago, is an Italian-American dish made from chicken on the bone and wedges of potato sauteed with garlic, oregano, white wine, and olive oil, then baked until the chicken's skin becomes crisp. The casserole is often garnished with a few green peas for color, although some more modern variations may omit some of these.

In Chicago, one also often finds the technique applied to other foods, like "steak Vesuvio", "pork chops Vesuvio", or even just "Vesuvio potatoes".

The origins of the dish are unknown, but some suggest it might have been popularized by the Vesuvio Restaurant, which operated at 15 E. Wacker Drive, Chicago, in the 1930s. Other food historians have suggested that variants of Chicken Vesuvio can be found among the chicken dishes of the traditional cuisines of southern Italy.

== See also ==
- Chicago culture
- List of chicken dishes
