= Mama Campisi's =

- Interactive map of Mama Campisi's

Restaurant information
- Established: 1939; 87 years ago
- Owners: Lance and Andrea Ervin
- Food type: Italian
- Dress code: Casual
- Location: 2132 Edwards Street, St Louis, MO, USA
- Coordinates: 38.61498°N 90.27508°W
- Seating capacity: 100
- Reservations: No
- Other locations: none
- Other information: Once known as Oldani's, reputed to have "invented" the Toasted Ravioli
- Website: http://www.mamasonthehill.com/

Mama Campisi's, formerly Oldani's and commonly known as Mama's on the Hill, is a restaurant in St. Louis, Missouri, which is located on The Hill, which is the "Little Italy" in that city, and one of the premier sources of Italian cuisine in the United States.

It was founded in 1939, by Leopold Oldani, and is credited with the invention of toasted ravioli, which is considered a key example of the Cuisine of St. Louis. It was renamed Mama Campisi's in 1982, and continued under that name until 2005, when it was closed down. It was reopened in 2006 by Lance and Andrea Ervin and it eventually became the center of an episode of Restaurant: Impossible. It was also featured on an episode of the Travel Channel's Man v. Food, hosted by Casey Webb, in December 2017.

== Toasted ravioli ==
Toasted ravioli is breaded, then toasted or fried, instead of being boiled or baked wet. It is reputed to have been "invented" by a chef named Fritz, at Oldani's restaurant. It was supposedly tasted by baseball legend Joe Garagiola's brother Mickey, and pronounced worthy of becoming a permanent item. It is now considered iconic of St. Louis cuisine, as well as having spread throughout the United States in general.
