= Cuisine of St. Louis =

Culinary culture of the Greater St. Louis area of Missouri, U.S.

The cuisine of St. Louis is influenced by the city’s history as a home for various European American immigrants and African Americans who migrated from the rural South.

While the cuisine is especially prevalent in St. Louis, it extends to other areas in Missouri and Illinois, forming a distinctive part of the cuisine of the Midwestern United States.

== Foods of St. Louis ==
A number of dishes are particularly distinctive to St. Louis.

Name	Image	Description
Frozen custard concrete		Ted Drewes developed a “malt shake” with frozen custard so thick that it can be turned upside down without falling out of its cup. Dubbed a "concrete", it was later imitated by a local franchisee of Dairy Queen, who blended soft serve with candy and cookies and developed the product known today as a Blizzard.
Gerber sandwich		A toasted, open-faced sandwich made from halved Italian or French bread, spread with garlic butter, topped with ham and Provel cheese.
Gooey butter cake		A type of cake supposedly invented by a German-American baker in St. Louis. It is buttery and sweet, and relatively short and dense compared to other cakes.
Mayfair salad dressing		Created by chef Fred Bangerter and head waiter Harry Amos at The Mayfair Room, Missouri's first five-star restaurant in the Mayfair Hotel in downtown St. Louis. While the original recipe is lost, several versions are still served in St. Louis.
Provel cheese		A white processed cheese, made from cheddar, Swiss, and provolone. One claim to its origin is that it was invented on the Hill, specifically for pizza, from Wisconsin’s Hoffman Dairy and Tony Costa, a local St. Louis restaurateur. Ed Imo bought Costa’s Grocery, which gave Imo’s Pizza the exclusive rights to sell Provel cheese in the area. Provel is manufactured by a Kraft Heinz subsidiary.
St. Louis-style ribs		Spare ribs that have had the sternum bone, cartilage, and rib tips removed, giving them a rectangular shape. The ribs are heavily sauced with a sweet and vinegary tomato-based barbecue sauce. In St. Louis-style barbecue, meats are grilled rather than slowly cooked over indirect heat.
Pork steaks		A steak cut from pork shoulder. Well-known in St. Louis, though it did not originate in the city.
St. Louis-style pizza		A type of pizza made with Provel cheese, sweet tomato sauce, and a very thin crust. It is often square-cut. St. Louis-style pizza is served at many local restaurants and chains such as Imo's Pizza.
St. Paul sandwich		A type of sandwich served at American Chinese takeout restaurants in St. Louis. It consists of an egg foo young patty (mung bean sprouts, minced white onions) served with dill pickle, white onion, mayonnaise, and lettuce, between two slices of white bread. Steven Yuen is said to have invented the sandwich in the 1940s for his restaurant Park Chop Suey.
Slinger		A late-night diner specialty made from two eggs, hash browns, and a ground beef patty, covered in chili con carne, and topped with cheese and onions.
Toasted ravioli		An appetizer made of breaded deep-fried ravioli, dusted with parmesan cheese, and served with marinara sauce. Generally, beef ravioli is breaded and deep fried until the pasta shell becomes crispy. It is commonly served at Italian-American restaurants in the city.
Red Hot Riplets		Ridge-cut potato chips flavored with "St. Louis Style Hot Sauce", a mix of hot chili pepper and sweet barbecue powdered seasoning.
Chop suey		Chop suey, from the mid-20th century, especially declined in the West Coast and the East Coast with new Chinese immigration and with more diverse types of food available, while it retained more prominence in the American Midwest, where there was less Chinese immigration. St. Louis, Missouri, as of 2012, continued to have a number of chop suey restaurants in low income neighborhoods. That year, the majority of them were in the northern part of the city, in African-American communities. The restaurants were spread around since the previous Chinatown, Hop Alley, was razed. In 2012, 22 restaurants directly used the words "chop suey" in their names.
