= Cheese alternative =

Replacement for cheese

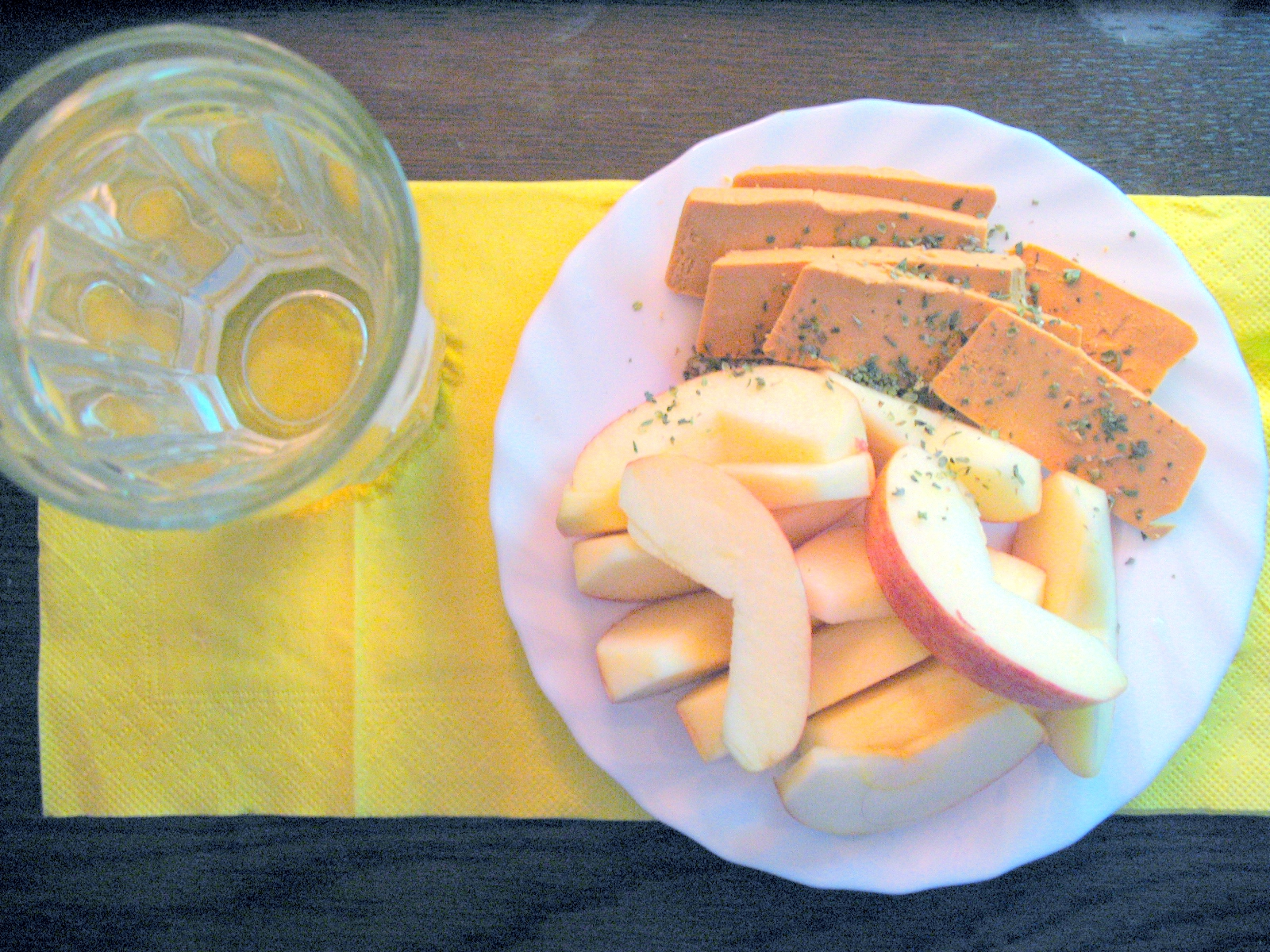
Sliced soy cheese on a snack platter

Cheese alternatives are products used as culinary replacements for cheese. They are usually products made by blending other fats or proteins and used in convenience foods. The category includes vegan cheeses as well as some dairy-containing products that do not qualify as traditional cheeses, such as processed cheese. These foods may be intended as replacements for cheese, as with vegan products, or as alternatives, as in the case of products used for salad bars and pizza-making, that may have other properties such as lower cholesterol content or different melting points that make them attractive to businesses.

== Vegan cheese ==
Vegan cheese may be made from soybeans, rice, almonds, nutritional yeast and other non-dairy ingredients. It is aimed at vegans and others wanting to avoid animal products, for moral, environmental, religious or health reasons, including lactose intolerance or a desire to avoid cholesterol. Vegan cheeses may be lower in fat compared to dairy cheese, are cholesterol-free and are often a source of soy protein and isoflavones. Many have calcium added. Several brands melt similarly to dairy cheese, while others stay mostly firm, or melt only when grated.

== Analogue pizza cheese ==
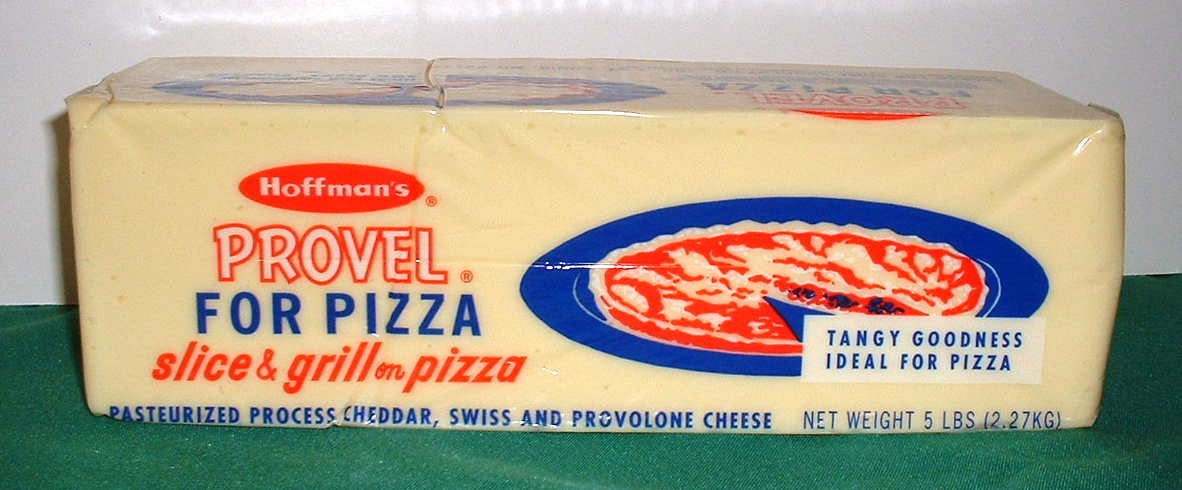
Provel pizza cheese in a five-pound block. This product is commonly used in the preparation of St. Louis-style pizza.

One variant of pasteurized processed cheese dairy products is, according to a hospitality industry source, designed to melt well on pizza, while remaining chewy; this has been described as "artificial cheesy substance that's much quicker and cheaper to produce than the real thing". In many cases the dairy fat required for anything described as cheese is replaced by cheaper vegetable oil and additives; this is not illegal if not described as cheese.

These products are sometimes referred to as "analogue pizza cheese". They are used on some commercially produced pizzas. They may be formulated for processing with basic cheese-making equipment, but without the additional equipment and processing that mozzarella cheese requires, such as the processes of mixing and molding. They tend to have a soft texture and once melted, may have a slightly "stringy" quality when pulled or bitten into. They may lack in a fusion, or melt together when cooked. It has been stated that pizza cheese appears to be the leading type of cheese analogue produced globally. In 1987 it was asserted that—at that time—each year in the United States over 700 million frozen pizzas were sold, three quarters of which contain cheese substitutes.
