= Imo's Pizza =

American pizza chain based in Missouri

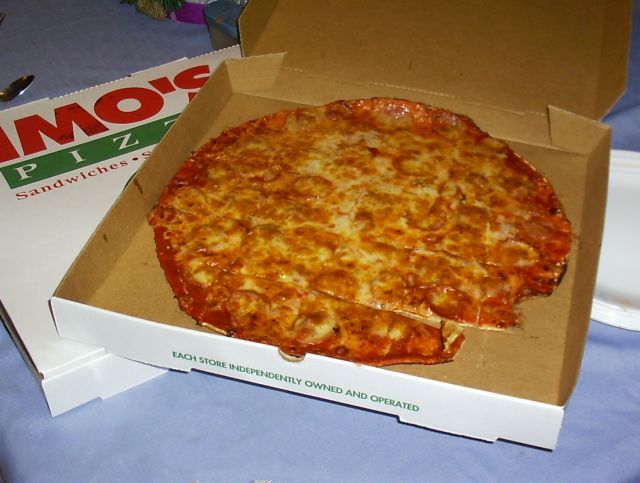
- A pizza from Imo's
- Industry: Restaurants
- Founded: St. Louis, Missouri, 1964; 62 years ago
- Founders: Ed and Margie Imo
- Headquarters: St. Louis, Missouri
- Number of locations: 99
- Area served: Midwest
- Products: St. Louis-style pizza, salads, appetizers, desserts
- Website: www.imospizza.com

Imo's Pizza is an American chain of pizza restaurants headquartered in St. Louis, Missouri. As of 2020, the company says it has more than 100 restaurants and stores in Missouri, Illinois and Kansas.

As of November 2015, Imo's was ranked the 32nd-largest pizza chain in the United States with gross sales of $93.8 million.

The chain is known for its version of St. Louis-style pizza, which is common in the area and features provel cheese—a combination of cheddar, Swiss, and provolone with a low melting point and gooey texture. The restaurants also sell salads, submarine sandwiches, and desserts, the last including ones that can be made in a pizza oven.

== History ==
St. Louis residents Ed and Margie Imo frequently ordered meat-topped pizzas from local Italian restaurants at 11:30 PM every Friday but had to pick up the pizzas themselves, as no pizza delivery service operated in the city at the time. Recognizing an opportunity, the couple decided to establish a pizza parlor that offered delivery and soon began searching for a location in The Hill neighborhood of St. Louis.

The first Imo's Pizza location opened at the intersection of Thurman Avenue and Shaw Boulevard in 1964 and was one of the first carryout and delivery pizza parlors west of the Mississippi River. Operating with limited resources, the couple purchased a used oven, two refrigerators, and a stove for $75. Ed Imo continued to work as a tile setter during the day while managing pizza preparation in the evenings, introducing the square slice style. Margie Imo handled customer service and food preparation, using a repurposed tackle box as the cash register.

The couple also hired a local chef, who replaced the traditional mozzarella cheese with Provel cheese. As demand for their product increased, Ed Imo sought a reliable supplier for Provel cheese, ultimately acquiring Costa Grocery, which held the distribution rights for the cheese in St. Louis.

Within eight months of opening, the couple began to establish additional locations. In 1979, Imo's began franchising, and by 1985 the chain had expanded to 30 parlors throughout the St. Louis region. Over the years, the menu expanded to include pasta, appetizers, sandwiches, and desserts.

In 2016, Imo's Pizza relocated its corporate headquarters and distribution operations to a new facility in downtown St. Louis, which includes a 72,000-square-foot warehouse and a 10,000-square-foot office space.

== See also ==
- List of pizza chains of the United States
- Cuisine of St. Louis
