= Gerber sandwich =

Open-faced sandwich with ham and cheese

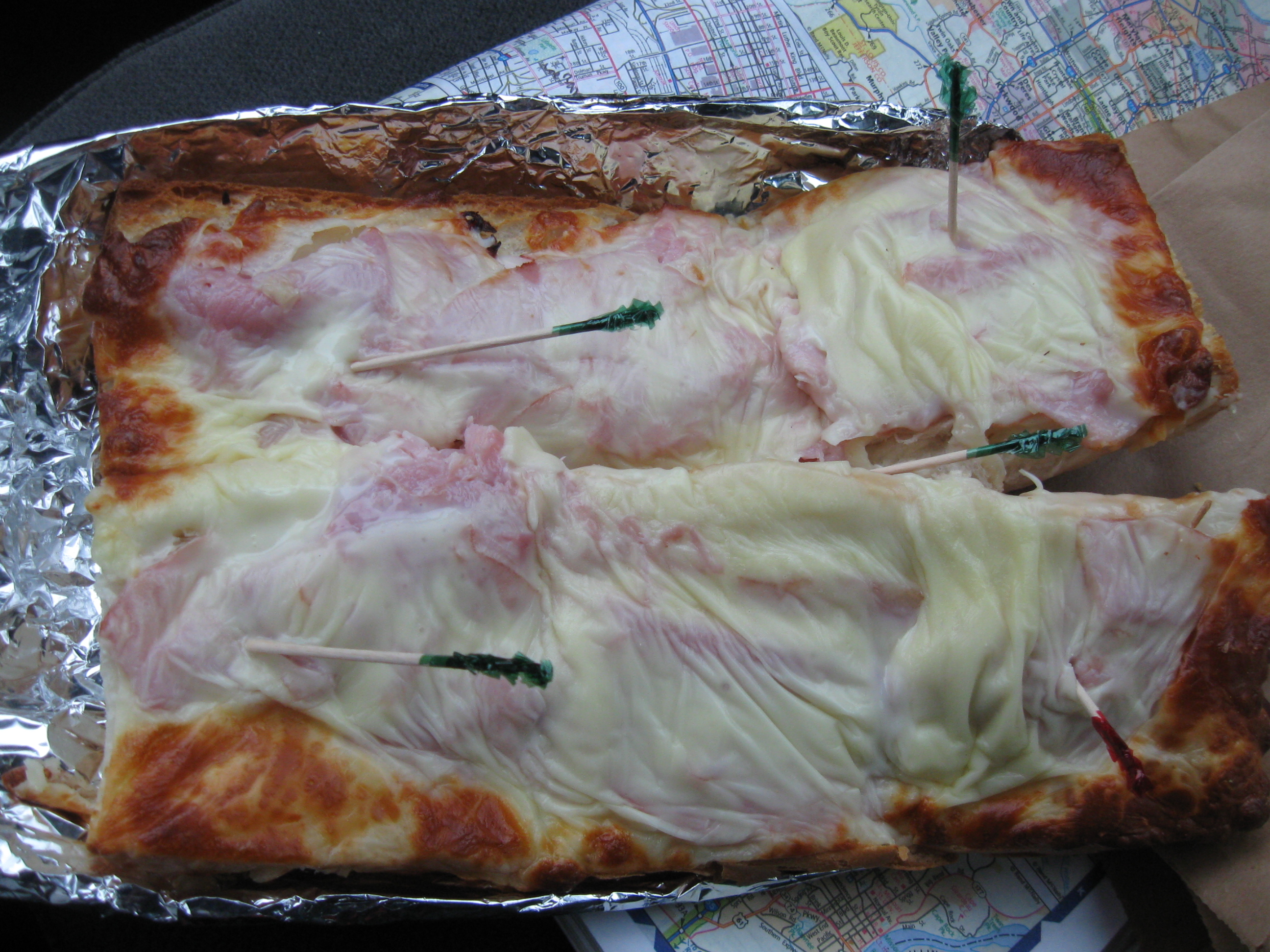
- Gerber sandwich
- Place of origin: United States
- Region or state: St. Louis, Missouri

The Gerber is an open-faced sandwich made in St. Louis, Missouri. The Gerber consists of a half section of Italian or French bread, spread with garlic butter and topped with ham and Provel cheese (the original sandwich was made with provolone), seasoned with a sprinkling of paprika and then toasted.

The "Gerber Special" was first made by the local family-owned Ruma's Deli, and named after their customer and next-store-neighbor, Dick Gerber. Gerber owned a tire store next to Ruma's Deli in the Covington Manor strip center, and the Rumas would allow him to create his own sandwich in their kitchen for a small fee. Dee and Tom Ruma were so impressed with the sandwich he concocted one day that they added the sandwich to the menu in 1973. The sandwich has been duplicated by many other St. Louis restaurants.

== See also ==
- Cuisine of St. Louis
- Garlic bread
- Open sandwich
- Croque-monsieur
- Ham and cheese sandwich
- Panino
- Zapiekanka
- List of American sandwiches
- List of sandwiches
