= Toasted ravioli =

Italian-American appetizer dish

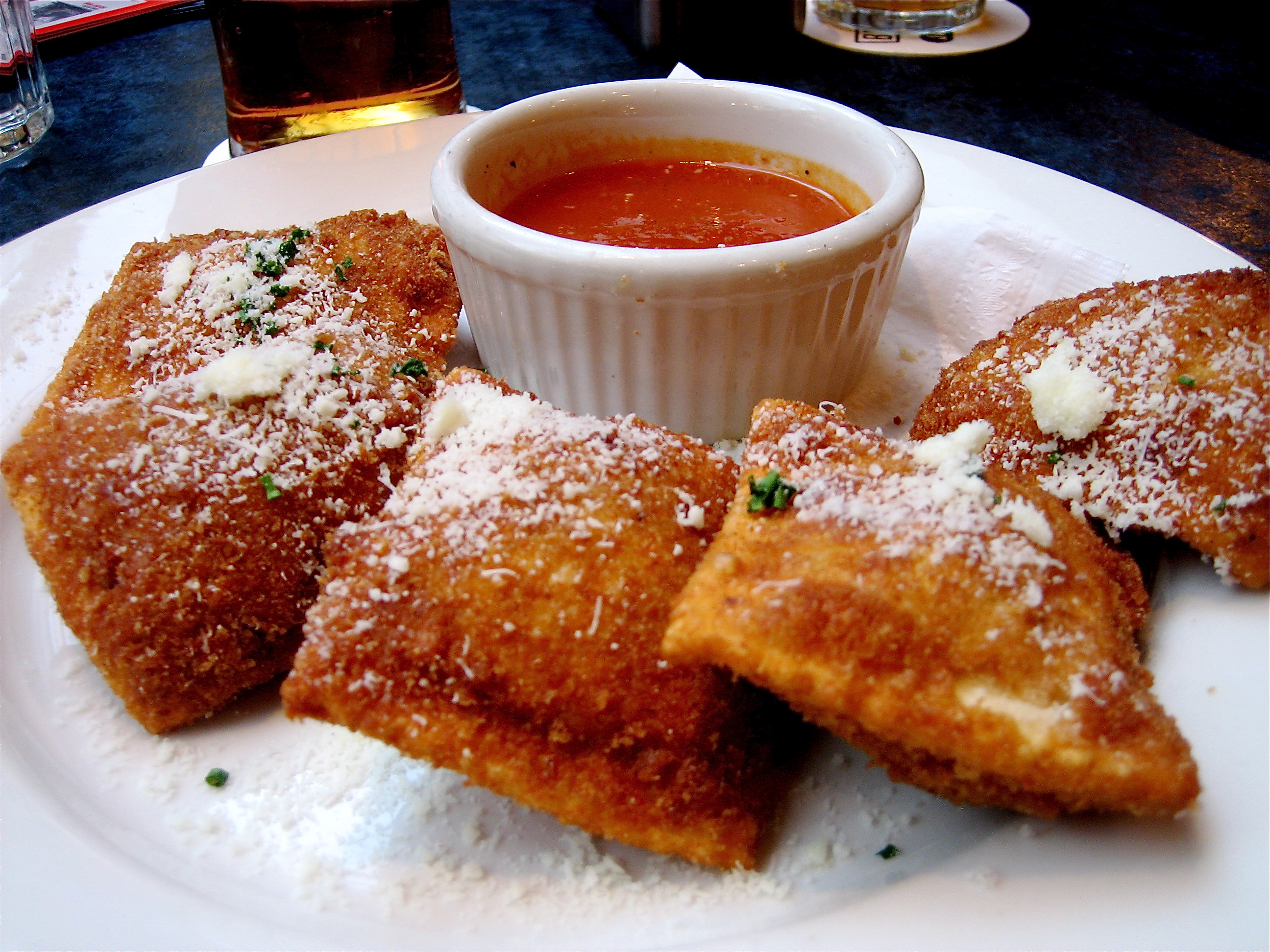
- Alternative names: T-ravs
- Type: Fried dish, pasta
- Place of origin: United States
- Region or state: St. Louis, Missouri
- Created by: disputed
- Main ingredients: Flour, eggs, water, cheese, ground meat (sometimes), tomato sauce

Toasted ravioli, colloquially known as T-ravs, is breaded deep-fried ravioli, usually served as an appetizer and also used to consume dipping sauce. It was created and popularized in St. Louis, Missouri.

== Origin ==
Most accounts of toasted ravioli trace its origins to a predominantly Italian-American neighborhood of St. Louis, The Hill. Supposedly, in the early 1940s, a ravioli was accidentally dropped into the fryer by a chef. Shortly thereafter, the item began appearing on menus across The Hill. While many restaurants on The Hill claim its creation, Charlie Gitto's "On The Hill" restaurant (then known as "Angelo's") is where it was made famous. That story claims that a chef at Angelo's, Mario Battocletti, accidentally dropped the pasta into oil after a misunderstanding. Chef and restaurateur Charlie Gitto, Jr. inherited the original recipe and still serves it at his restaurants to this day.

Another claim is from Mama Campisi's as well as Louis Oldani. Oldani is said to have named the dish 'toasted' ravioli because he thought 'toasted' was more appealing than 'fried'.

Lombardo's Restaurants, located around the St. Louis area, also claim to have been among the first to bring toasted ravioli to the States from Sicily; their current owner, Tony Lombardo, shows menus from the 1930s that include it. Lombardo's toasted ravioli frequently tops lists as the "best t-ravs in St. Louis".

== Composition, varieties, and service ==
Generally, some type of meat is wrapped in square ravioli, breaded and deep fried until the pasta shell becomes slightly crispy, dry and browned. Toasted ravioli is generally served with marinara sauce for dipping and Parmesan cheese may also be sprinkled on top.

== See also ==
- Cuisine of St. Louis
- Cuisine of the Midwest
- Cuisine of the United States
- Fried wonton, a deep-fried and crispy Chinese dumpling
- Pot sticker, a pan-fried Chinese dumpling
- List of deep-fried foods
- List of pasta dishes
- St. Louis–style pizza, another Italian dish from St. Louis
- Carrozza
