= Pizza cheese =

Cheese for use specifically on pizza

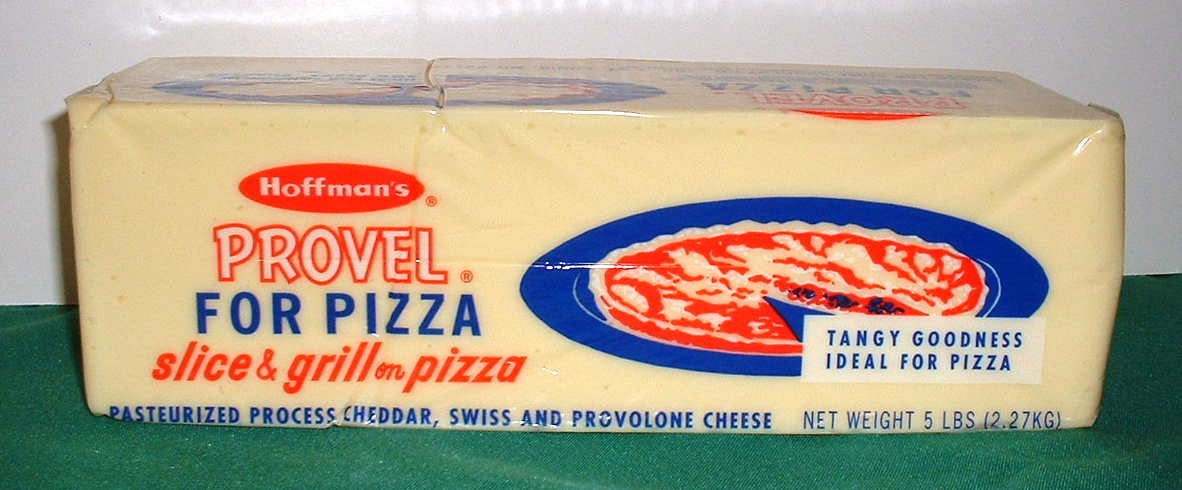
Provel pizza cheese in a five-pound block. This product is commonly used in the preparation of St. Louis–style pizza.

Pizza cheese encompasses several varieties and types of cheeses and dairy products that are designed and manufactured for use specifically on pizza. These include processed and modified cheese, such as mozzarella-like processed cheeses and mozzarella variants. The term can also refer to any type of cheese suitable for use on pizza. The most popular cheeses used in the preparation of pizza are mozzarella (accounting for about 30%), provolone, cheddar and Parmesan. Emmental, pecorino romano and ricotta are often used as toppings, and processed pizza cheeses manufactured specifically for pizza are mass-produced. Some mass-produced pizza cheeses are frozen after manufacturing and shipped frozen.

Processed pizza cheese is manufactured to produce optimal qualities in browning, melting, stretchiness and fat and moisture content. Several studies and experiments have analyzed the impact of vegetable oil, manufacturing and culture processes, denatured whey proteins and other changes to create ideal and economical pizza cheeses. In 1997, it was estimated that annual production of pizza cheese products was 1 million tons in the United States and 100,000 in Europe, and in 2000 demand for the product in Europe was increasing by 8% per year. The trend of steadily-increasing production and consumption of mozzarella and pizza cheese continued into the first decade of the 21st century in the United States.

== Varieties and types ==
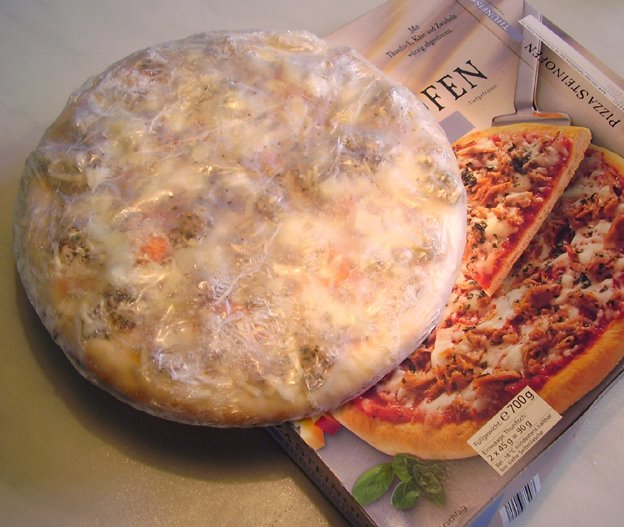
A wrapped frozen pizza

The International Dictionary of Food and Cooking defines pizza cheese as "a soft spun-curd cheese similar to Mozzarella made from cow's milk [that is] used particularly for pizzas and contains somewhat less water than real Mozzarella" Most are at least 95 percent mozzarella, with different moisture and fat densities. Cheese for frozen pizzas may be comminuted, in which the cheese is processed into minute granules or fragments. Low-moisture mozzarella can be formulated specifically for pizza. Cheese may be processed into blocks, from which the product can be grated, made into granules or sliced for use on pizza or other foods. Pizza cheese frequently consists of a blend of two or more cheeses, such as low-moisture mozzarella or provolone. Low-moisture mozzarella was first manufactured in dairy factories in the Midwestern United States, and was originally called "pizza cheese". Compared to standard mozzarella, low-moisture mozzarella has a firmer texture, is easier to grate, has better browning and melting characteristics, and is less perishable.

Globally, mozzarella is the most popular pizza cheese. However, it has been estimated that in the United States only 30% of all pizza cheese used is actual mozzarella. Provolone is the second most popular one. Cheddar may be mixed with mozzarella to preserve chewiness. Grated Parmesan may be added to the top of a pizza, and typically does not melt well when cooked. A diverse variety of processed pizza cheeses are produced, including analogue cheese. Provel is one example. Other pizza cheeses include Emmental and pecorino romano; Detroit-style pizza is noted for its use of Wisconsin brick cheese. Ricotta is used for calzones or as a topping.

Several cheeses may be mixed together in its formulation, and each has individual browning and blistering characteristics. For example, a combination of mozzarella and Cheddar may blister less when cooked compared to other combinations, because cheddar has less elasticity, while mozzarella and provolone may brown less compared to other combinations.

=== Processed pizza cheeses ===
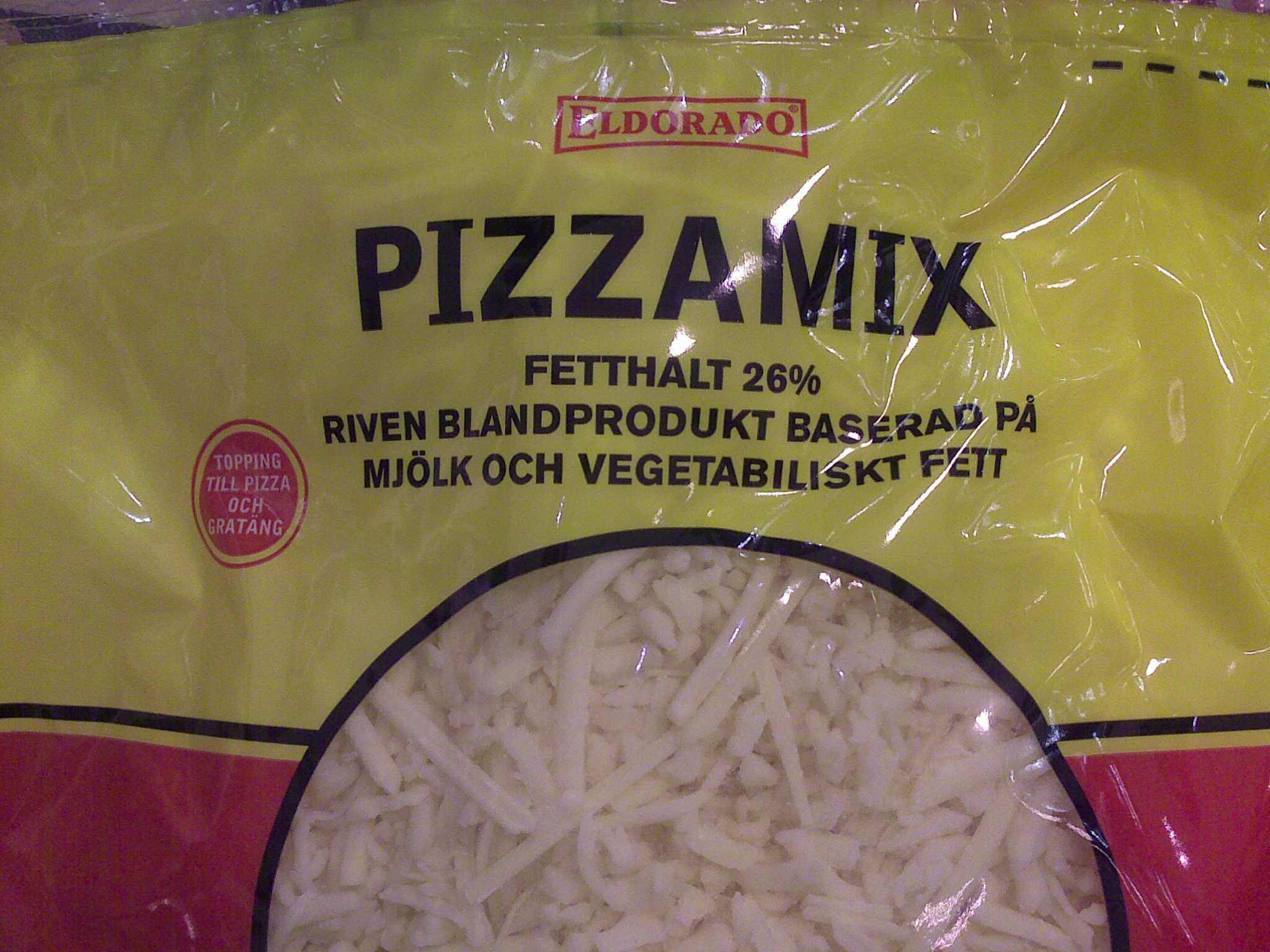
A Swedish processed pizza cheese mix prepared with milk and vegetable fat, with a total fat content of 26%

Pasteurized and processed cheese-like products for pizza that are quicker and cheaper to produce than real cheese and designed to melt well and remain chewy are used on many mass-produced pizzas in North America and the United Kingdom. These products are referred to as analogue (or analog) pizza cheese; in the UK the term "cheese analogue" is used, making clear that it is not actually cheese. In the book Technology of Cheesemaking, editors Law and Tamimethat state that analogue pizza cheese appears to be the leading type of cheese analogue produced globally. Each year in the United States, 700 million frozen pizzas are sold, three-quarters of which contain cheese substitutes.

Analogue pizza cheeses may be formulated for processing with less sophisticated cheese-making equipment than is required for mozzarella cheese, such as using simple mixing and molding. They tend to have a soft texture and once melted, may have a slightly "stringy" quality when pulled or bitten into. They may lack fusion, i.e. shredded pieces might not flow together when they melt. New stabilizer systems have been developed that have helped to enable the creation of analogue pizza cheeses.

An example of a processed pizza cheese is Provel, which uses Cheddar, Swiss, and provolone cheeses as flavorants. Some analogue types are made with casein, a by-product of milk, and vegetable oil, rather than milk fat. Casein-based mozzarella-like imitation processed cheeses prepared using rennet are also used as a mozzarella substitute on frozen pizzas.

In some instances, the production of analogue pizza cheese can be similar to the production of cream cheese, although production may be different and homogenization may be avoided. In some varieties, the product is heated to remain at a specific temperature and for a specific amount of time, which causes the proteins in the mix to gelatinize. During this process, salts in the mix serve to emulsify it and thus improve the meltability of the final product. The heated product is then placed in packaging such as bags-in-boxes while still hot, as it will flow when hot but solidifies as it cools. During packaging, these types of pizza cheeses are then quick-cooled to avoid browning of the product, which can occur via the Maillard reaction.

== Research and development ==
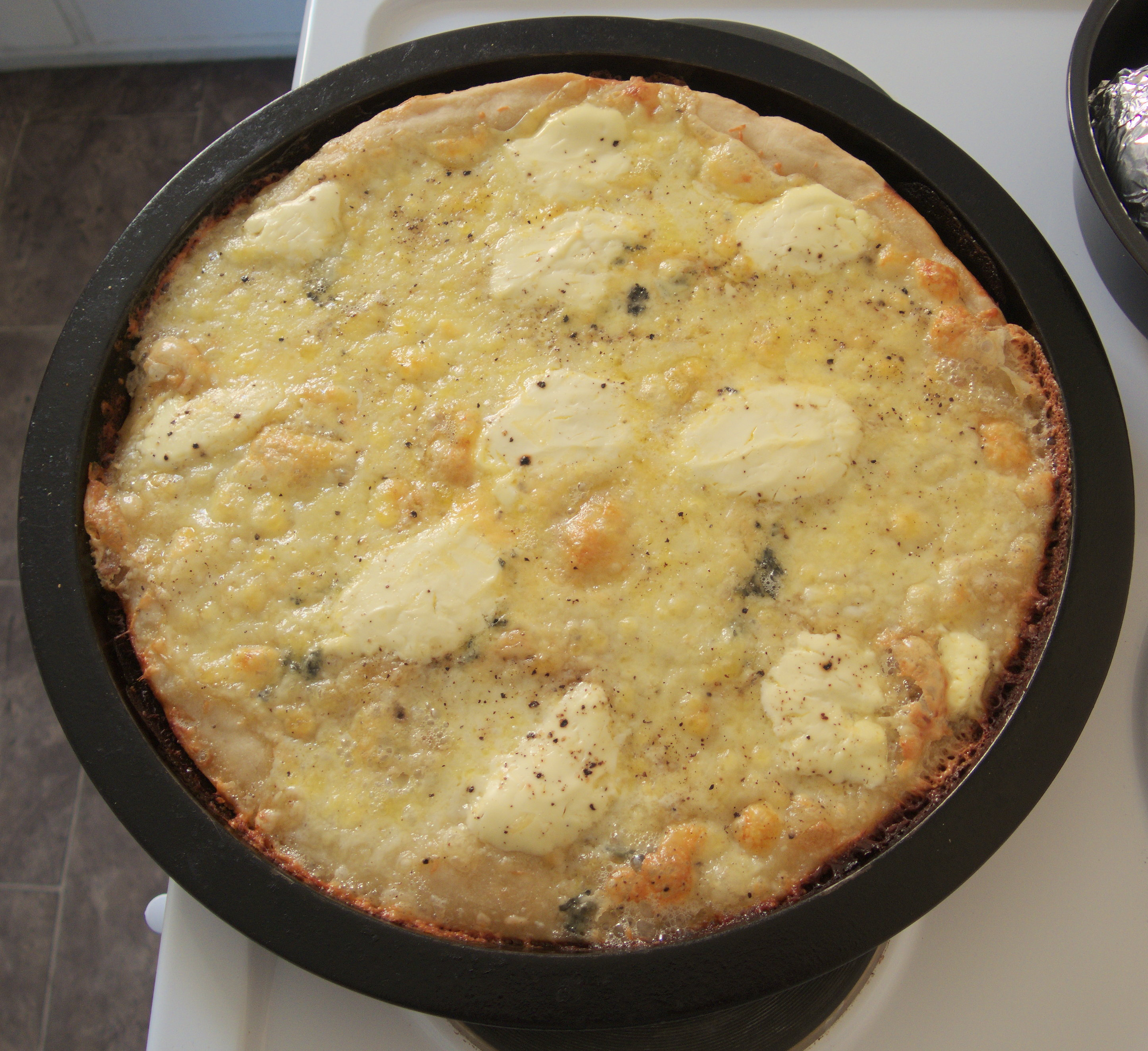
A cheese pizza

Manufacturers and academics have conducted studies and experiments in an effort to improve the stretchiness, melting characteristics, browning, fat content and water retention of pizza cheese. Several patents exist for specialized varieties of pizza cheese and for its processing. A study by Rudan and Barbano found that the addition of a thin layer of vegetable oil atop low- and reduced-fat pizza cheese increased meltability and reduced browning and dehydration when the product was cooked, but the texture remained overly chewy and tough. A study by Perry et al. found various methods to heighten the melt of low-fat pizza cheese by increasing its moisture, including the use of pre-acidification, fat-replacers, and exopolysaccharide starter cultures as well as higher pasteurization temperatures.

Manufacturers aim for a moisture content of 50–52% and a fat-in-dry-matter content of 35–40%. A study published in the International Journal of Food & Science Technology found that a 12.5:87.5 blend of vetch milk and cow milk improved stretchiness and melting characteristics. Vetch is a legume that has seeds which are similar to lentils. An experiment published in the International Journal of Dairy Technology suggested that the level of galactose, a monosaccharide sugar that is less sweet than glucose and fructose, can be reduced using different culture techniques. An article in the International Journal of Food Engineering found that trisodium citrate, a food additive used to preserve and add flavor to foods, slightly improved the preferred qualities of pizza cheese. Research published in Dairy Industries International suggested that denatured whey proteins increased moisture retention, but that the improvements were very slight and not economically worthwhile relative to the minor improvements.

Some consumers prefer pizza cheese with less browning, which can be achieved using low-moisture part-skim mozzarella with a low galactose content. (Note: Galactose is a type of sugar found in dairy products and other foods that is less sweet than glucose. Sugar in foods can lead to caramelization when they are cooked, which increases their browning.) Some varieties derived from skim mozzarella variants were designed not to require aging or the use of fermentation starter. Others can be produced through the direct acidification of milk, which may be used in place of bacterial fermentation.

== Production and business ==
In the United States, the production and consumption of mozzarella and pizza cheese steadily increased in the mid-20th century, and this trend has continued into the first decade of the 21st century. In the U.S., several hundred million pounds of pizza cheese is consumed annually. In 1997, it was estimated that annual production of the product was 1 million tons (2 billion pounds) in the United States and 100,000 tonnes (98,000 long tons; 110,000 short tons, 220,460,000 pounds) in Europe. It has been estimated that 30% of all pizza cheese used in the United States is mozzarella. As of 2000, demand for the product was growing in Europe by 8 percent per year.

Mass-produced pizza cheese is used by the foodservice industry, quick service restaurants, and other industries and businesses. The world's largest manufacturer of pizza cheese, Leprino Foods Company, processes 600,000 tonnes (590,000 long tons; 660,000 short tons, 1,322,760,000 pounds) a year. Leprino Foods holds patents for some specialized mozzarella production processes that enable the quick manufacture of the product. One such product is a frozen shredded cheese used for pizza that is created in a few hours from milk. Other U.S. companies also mass-produce pizza cheese, which is shipped in a frozen state. As of 2000, Glanbia is the largest producer of pizza cheese in Europe. Some retail and commercially mass-produced frozen pizzas have cheese stuffed into the pizza crust.

== Use by region ==
Significant amounts of pizza cheese are used in Europe, Australia, New Zealand and the United States. Whole milk mozzarella is popular in pizzas in the East and Southwest regions of the U.S., while one survey showed that provolone was more popular on the east and west coast. Cheddar may be used more in the Eastern and Southern regions of the U.S. Provel cheese is typically used in the preparation of St. Louis–style pizza in the U.S.

== See also ==
- Food processing
- List of cheeses
- Novozymes
- Pasta filata – a technique to produce a stretched curd cheese suitable for pizza
