= Provel cheese =

White processed cheese product

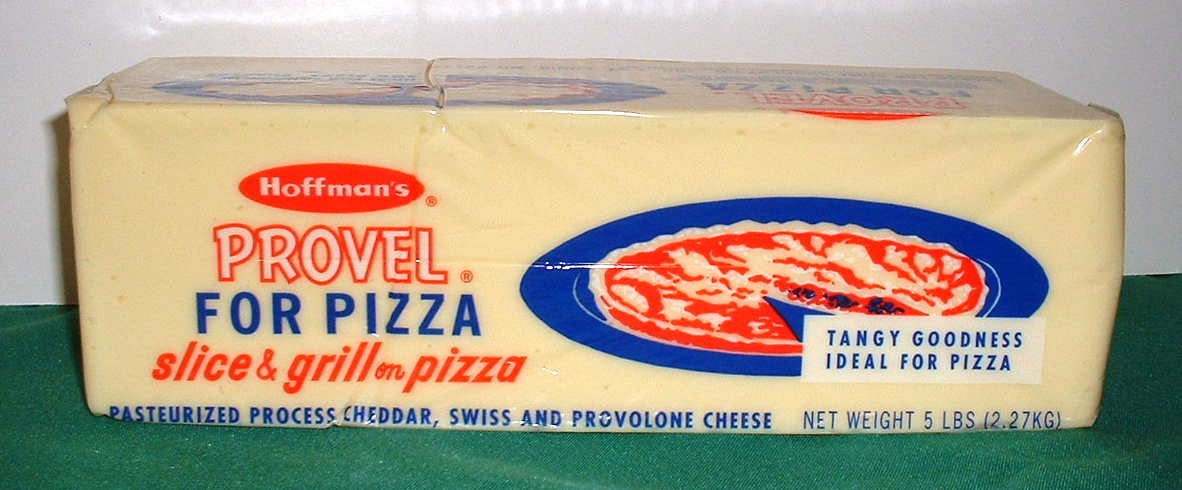
- Provel pasteurized processed cheese for pizza in a 5-pound block
- Country of origin: United States
- Town: St. Louis
- Source of milk: Cows

Provel (/proʊˈvɛl/ proh-VEL) is a white processed cheese prominent in St. Louis cuisine. A combination of cheddar, Swiss, provolone, and liquid smoke, Provel has a low melting point, a gooey texture, and a buttery flavor.

Provel cheese is the traditional cheese used for St. Louis–style pizza. It is also used in pasta sauces, cheese soup, salads, and sandwiches such as the Gerber sandwich.

Provel is rarely used or sold outside of St. Louis. Provel can be purchased at St. Louis-area grocery stores such as Schnucks or Dierbergs Markets, and Hy-Vee grocery stores across the Midwest.

== History ==
Provel was purportedly invented for St. Louis–style pizza in the 1940s by Costa Grocery (now Roma Grocery on the Hill), in collaboration with Hoffman Dairy of Wisconsin (now part of Lactalis), according to St. Louis Post-Dispatch food writer Joe Bonwich. Provel was developed to meet demand for a pizza cheese with a clean bite, melting well while breaking off nicely when cut or bitten. Imo's Pizza founder Ed Imo claims credit for popularizing Provel through his chain.

Neither Kraft Foods nor Roma Grocery has a definitive answer for the origin of the name, although one popular theory is that it is a portmanteau of the words provolone and mozzarella, two of the cheeses for which it is substituted.

=== Trademark ===
The Provel name trademark was first used in 1947 and held by the Churny Company, Inc. of Glenview, Illinois. Churny later became a wholly owned subsidiary of Kraft Foods after it was closed in 2012.

In 2021, Lactalis acquired Hoffman Dairy from Kraft. As of 2024, Lactalis holds the Provel name trademark, but does not appear to be using this name: Hoffman's Pizza Cheese is simply known as "2/5 LB St. Louis Style Pizza Cheese" in the Lactalis Culinary catalogue.

=== Distribution ===
Imo's Pizza acquired Costa's Grocery, which had the sole rights to sell Provel in St. Louis, some time between 1964 and 1985. Imo's continues to package and sell shredded Provel cheese to end customers, as of 2026.

== See also ==
- Processed cheese
- Italian-American cuisine
- Cuisine of St. Louis
