= Mayfair Hotel (St. Louis, Missouri) =

- U.S. National Register of Historic Places
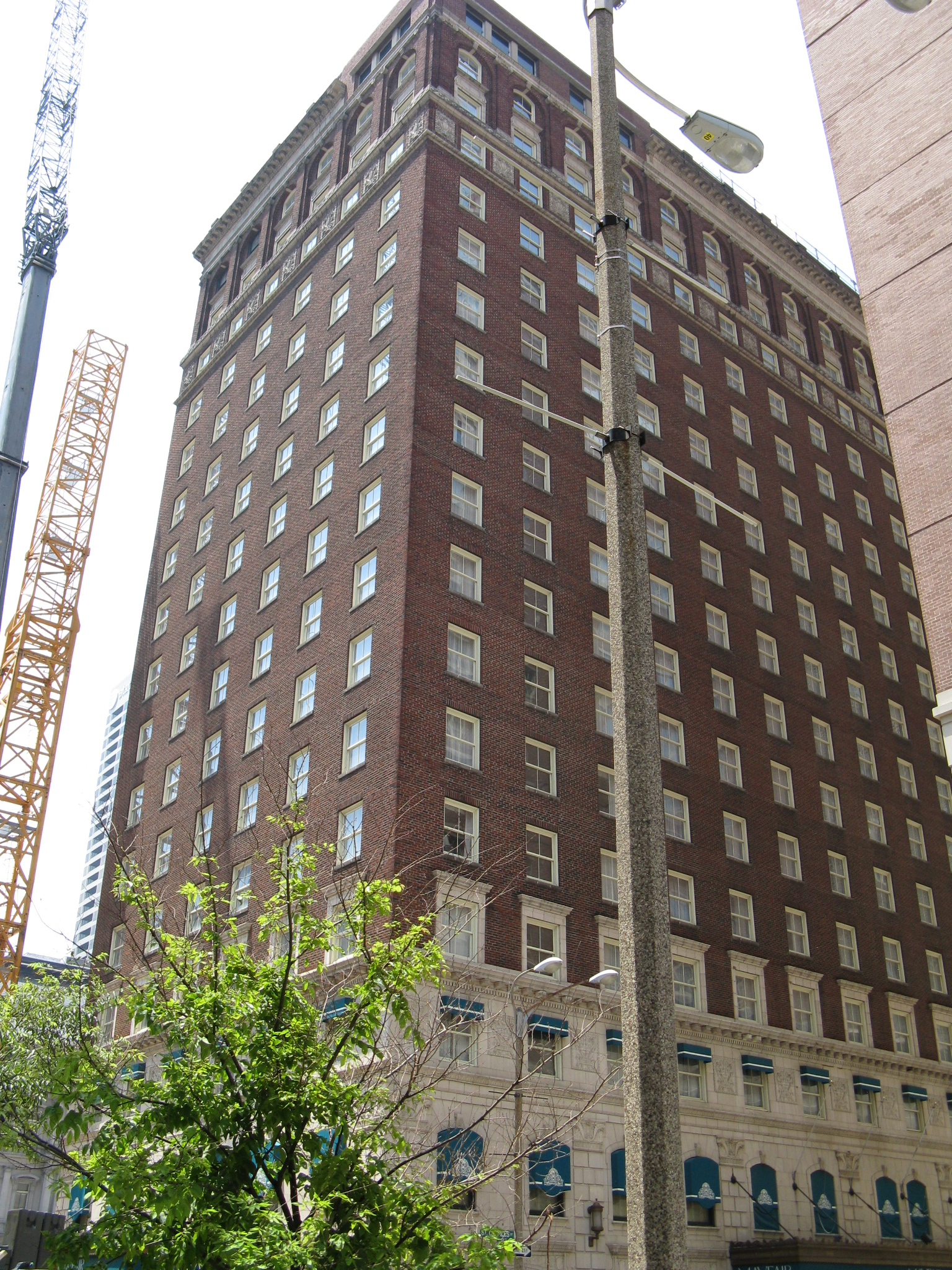

- Location within St. Louis Location within Missouri Location within the United States
- Location: 806 St. Charles Ave., St. Louis, Missouri
- Coordinates: 38°37′48″N 90°11′31″W
- Area: less than one acre
- Built: c. 1924-26
- Architect: Bradshaw, Preston J.
- NRHP reference No.: 79003638
- Added to NRHP: September 17, 1979

The Magnolia Hotel St. Louis is a historic hotel in downtown St. Louis, Missouri. Opened in 1925, it has been known for most of its existence as the Mayfair Hotel.

The Mayfair was founded by hotelier Charles Heiss, a Bavarian who worked in hotels in Europe, Canada, and elsewhere in America. Heiss served as the assistant manager at the Knickerbocker Hotel in New York City and as the manager of the Detroit hotel of the Statler Hotels, an early American hotel chain. Statler transferred Heiss to St. Louis to manage its hotel there, which he did for some years before having a disagreement with Mr. Statler, in which he swore to build better hotels nearby in St. Louis.

Designed by prominent St. Louis architect Preston J. Bradshaw, the hotel's 18-story building was built in 1924 and 1925. The concrete building is faced in red brick and terra cotta; it uses terra cotta extensively in its facing, window frames, ornaments, and cornices. The building had three high-speed elevators run by elevator operators. The Mayfair opened its doors on August 29, 1925, for a private reception and dinner for the 120 stockholders and contractors. The next evening, 4,000 guests were invited for a grand opening and dedication.

The Mayfair Hotel featured a nine-chair barbershop, a six-booth beauty parlor (unlike at many hotels where these services would be located in a basement), and private dining rooms and a luxurious lounge in the mezzanine off the lobby. Among the hotel's guests throughout the years were Irving Berlin, John Barrymore, Douglas Fairbanks, Cary Grant, Harry Truman, and Lyndon B. Johnson.

In 1925, Radio station KMOX went on the air from a studio in the mezzanine. KMOX installed an $18,000 Kilgen organ and held recitals every day at noon and between 6 and 7 p.m.

In 1977, the hotel was renovated. Some 85 rooms were removed and the interior redecorated, but original features were kept when possible, maintaining the building's historic value. The hotel was added to the National Register of Historic Places on September 17, 1979.

The hotel was sold in 2003 to local businessmen Michael and Steven Roberts, who renamed it the Roberts Mayfair Hotel. The hotel was managed by Wyndham Hotels for a time during this period. The brothers built a condominium tower next to the hotel, which proved unsuccessful, forcing them to sell the hotel to UrbanStreet Group in 2012, who then resold it for $4 million to Magnolia Hotels in 2013. Magnolia renovated the hotel, and reopened it in 2014 as the Magnolia Hotel St. Louis.

== See also ==
- Mayfair salad dressing
- Washington Avenue Historic District, St. Louis
