= Red Hot Riplets =

American snack food

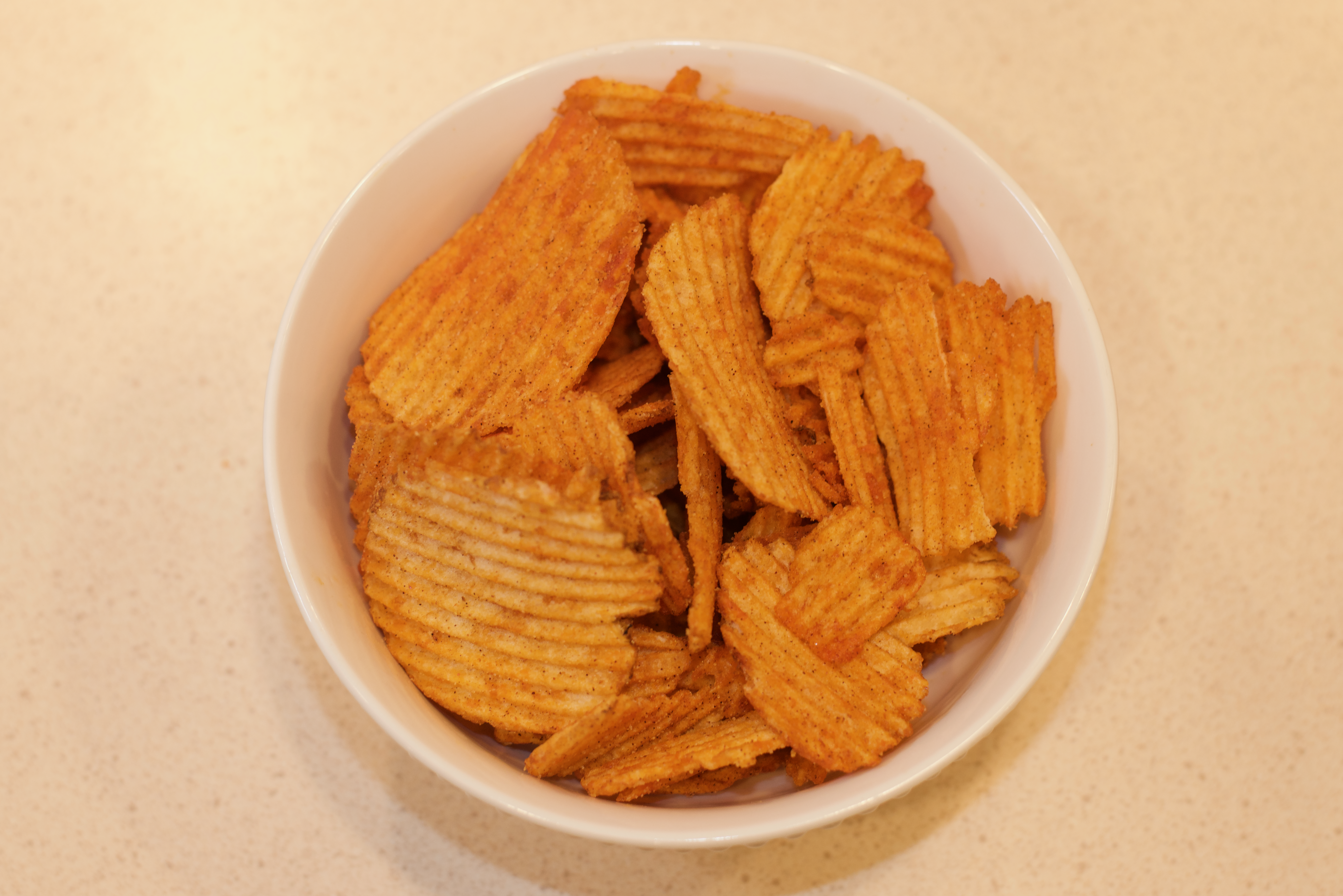
A bowl of Red Hot Riplets

Red Hot Riplets are a kind of spicy potato chips sold in St. Louis, Missouri. Red Hot Riplets are ridge-cut chips covered with hot chili pepper and sweet barbecue powdered seasoning. The label describes the flavoring as "St. Louis Style Hot Sauce".

Old Vienna Snack Food Co. distributes Riplets locally. The chips are sold at many local businesses, from mom and pop stores to chains such as Schnucks and even 7-Eleven.

== Flavor ==
Red Hot Riplets are spicier than potato chips available in national brands.

The chips have a bright red color that comes naturally from the powdered peppers. Red Hot Riplets used to be fried in partially hydrogenated vegetable shortening, but they are now fried in liquid vegetable oils.

Old Vienna has also made Red Hot Thins with same seasoning on thin-cut potato chips, Cheesy Red Hot Riplets with the addition of a cheese powder, and Red Hot Pork rinds.

In 2003 Esquire magazine included Red Hot Riplets in their article and list "Best Potato Chips You've Never Tasted".

== Manufacturer ==
Old Vienna Snack Food Company was founded in 1936 by Louis Kaufman in St. Louis. The firm changed hands many times before folding in 1996. In that same year, a group of former employees resurrected the brand, which continues to be headquartered in the city of Fenton, a suburb of St. Louis. As of 2015, the company had about 20 employees.

As of late 2007, there was a bottled hot sauce with a label similar to the Red Hot Riplets bag, that contained "St. Louis Style" hot sauce. The hot sauce was discontinued, but was brought back in 2018.

Distribution of the seasoning is throughout the St, Louis region at local markets, gas stations, and will be available in St. Louis grocery stores in Spring of 2017. Many St. Louis restaurants have also added new menu items featuring the Red Hot Riplet Seasoning.

Their other products include:

- Cheesy Red Hot Riplets Potato Chips
- Red Hot Riplets Potato (Thins) (Discontinued)
- Hot Corn Chips (Red Hot Riplet spiced corn chips.)
- Sweet & Tangy Corn Chips
- Cheese Popcorn
- White Cheddar Popcorn
- Hot Cheese Popcorn
- Hot Diggety's Corn Puffs
- Original Pork Rinds
- Red Hot Pork Rinds
- Bar B Que Pork Rinds
- Red Hot Riplets Nuggets
- Movie Theatre Popcorn

== In popular culture ==
The chips are also known outside of St. Louis because of the rappers Murphy Lee and Nelly. Murphy Lee wrote a song "Red Hot Riplets" (from the album Murphy's Law) that mentions them in the chorus. When Murphy Lee was included in the Rap Snacks line of chips, he had them duplicate the Red Hot Riplets recipe as his flavor of Rap Snacks.

== "Not For Sale in CA" Label ==
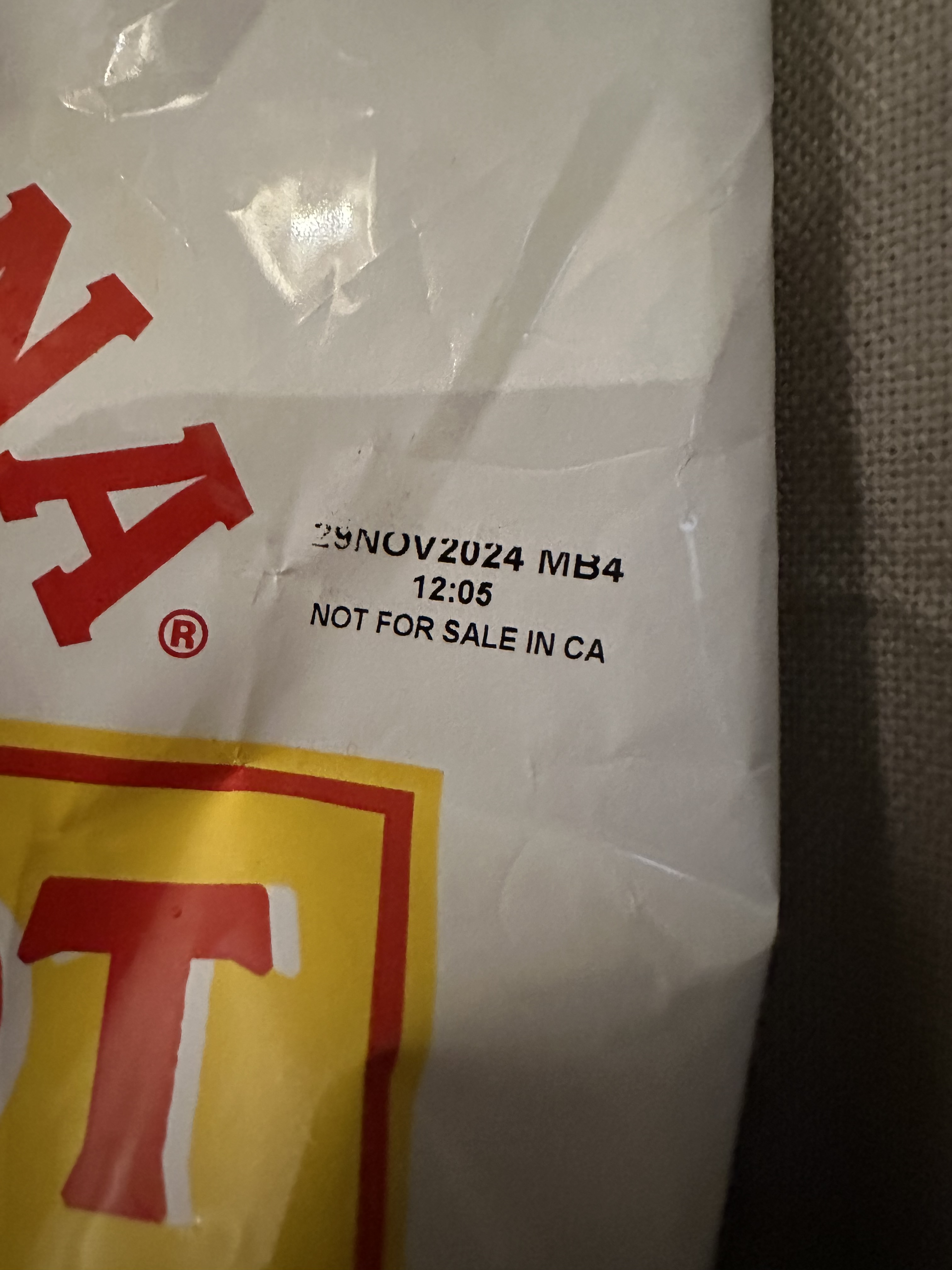
Not for sale in CA label on a bag of Red Hot Riplets.

Due to Acrylamide found in the chip, they have to put on a P65 Warning Label on it or have to reduce the levels of acrylamide to the lowest amount possible. But the Old Vienna Chip Company decided to do neither. So they cannot be sold in California.

In an interview with Old Vienna Chip Company Office Administrator Elisha Schaffer "We can't change our bags just for one state," "Because our product is not manufactured in California, we do not have that warning on our products, and we will not change our bags to put that warning on there, therefore ... we are not allowed to ship to California."
