= Mayfair salad dressing =

Salad dressing incorporating anchovies

- Type: Salad dressing
- Place of origin: United States
- Region or state: St. Louis, Missouri
- Created by: Cornelius Deken, Mayfair Hotel
- Main ingredients: Cooking oil (corn or canola), eggs, anchovies, garlic, mustard or horseradish mustard, celery, onions, champagne, and black peppercorns

Mayfair salad dressing is a salad dressing incorporating anchovies, created at the Mayfair Hotel in downtown St. Louis. It was first served in the hotel's restaurant, The Mayfair Room, the first five-star restaurant in Missouri, which featured Elizabethan-inspired decor. Chef Fred Bangerter is believed to have created the dressing around 1935. The dressing was also credited to the head waiter of that era named Harry Amos.

== Ingredients ==
According to legend, Mayfair salad dressing is made from an oil (such as corn or canola) and whole egg base seasoned with anchovies, garlic, prepared mustard (horseradish mustard may be used), celery, onion, champagne, and black peppercorns. Sometimes monosodium glutamate is also used.

The dressing was the signature dish at the historic Nantucket Cove restaurant in St. Louis, whence the proprietor had purchased the tightly guarded secret recipe from the Mayfair hotel itself. While the original recipe remains a secret, there are many versions of "Mayfair dressing" on the menu in present day St. Louis restaurants.

Restaurants Known to Serve Mayfair Dressing

Mayfair Hotel (Closed)

Romine's Chicken (Closed)

Malone's Grill & Pub (Purchased Romine's, Now Closed)

Citizen Kane's in Kirkwood, MO

O'Connell's Pub in Saint Louis, MO

Sam's Steakhouse in Saint Louis, MO

The Concord Grill in Saint Louis, MO

Robies on 8th, at the Magnolia Hotel in Saint Louis, MO (Original Building was once the Mayfair Hotel)
