= St. Louis–style pizza =

Regional pizza style

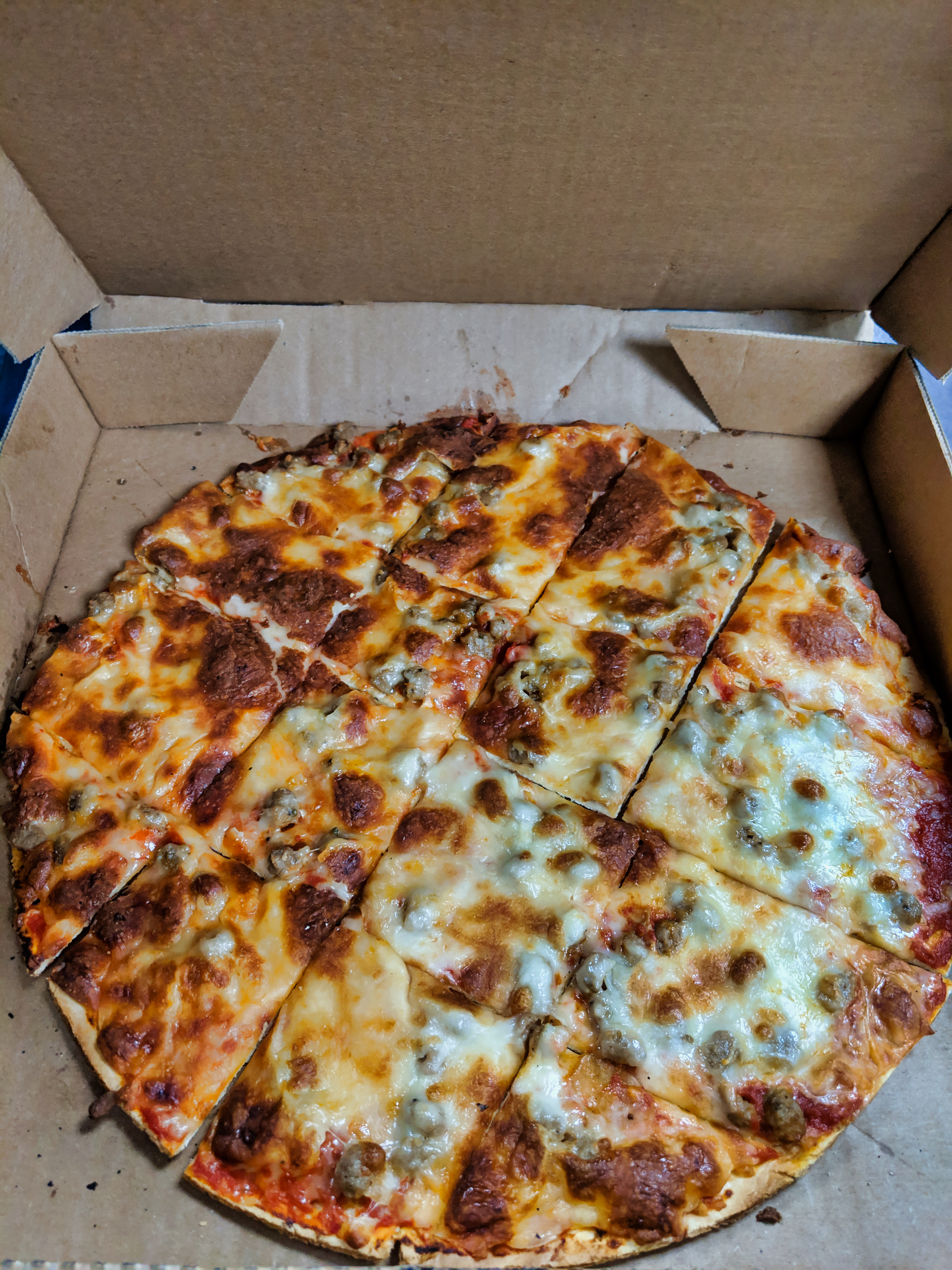
- Type: Pizza
- Place of origin: United States
- Region or state: St. Louis, Missouri
- Main ingredients: Thin pizza crust, sweet tomato sauce, Provel cheese

St. Louis–style pizza is a type of pizza in St. Louis, Missouri, United States, and surrounding areas. The pizza has a thin cracker-like crust, is topped with sweet tomato sauce and provel cheese, and is cut into squares or rectangles (rather than wedges).

St. Louis–style pizza is available at local restaurants and chains, such as Imo's Pizza. Frozen St. Louis–style pizzas are sold at local supermarkets such as Schnucks and Dierbergs Markets.

== Distinct characteristics ==
=== Thin crust ===
The crust of St. Louis–style pizza is crisp and cracker-like, unlike the doughier deep dish pizza and New York–style pizza. There is a common internet misconception that St. Louis-style pizza is made without yeast, or even unleavened, but it has been found that most of the major pizzerias serving it, as well as the historical recipes, use yeast to leaven their doughs.

Instead of the larger pie-like wedges seen in other pizza styles, it is cut into three- or four-inch squares, referred to as a party cut or tavern cut. It has been suggested that the square cut was inspired by Ed Imo’s former profession as a tile-layer. The smaller slices and rigid crust help support the weight of its toppings, although this style of slicing has predated this.

=== Provel cheese ===
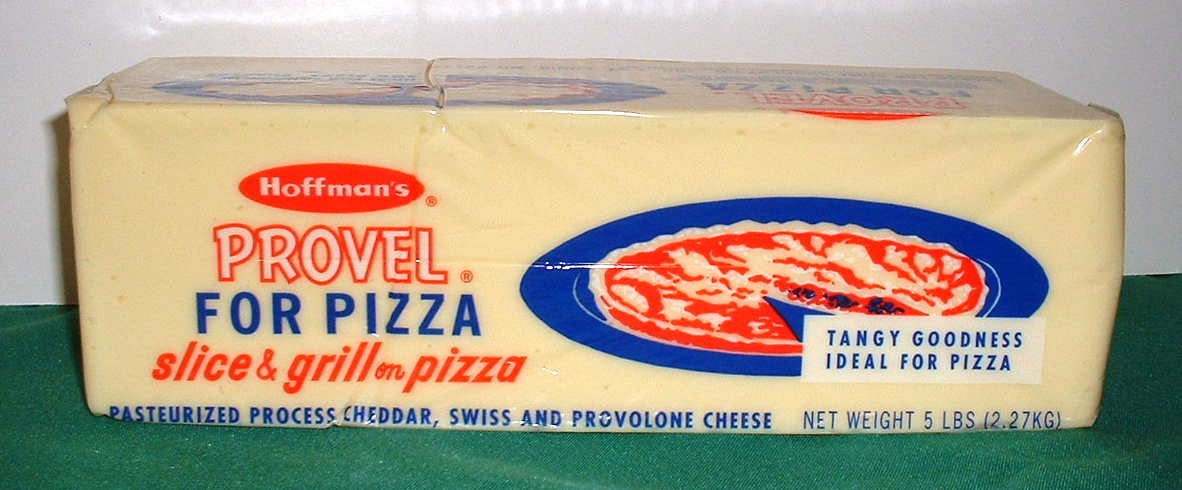
A five-pound block of Provel cheese

Provel cheese is used in place of mozzarella. Provel is a white processed cheese made from cheddar, Swiss, and provolone, developed by Costa Grocery in St. Louis during the 1950s. It’s made in Wisconsin by a Kraft Heinz subsidiary, primarily for the St. Louis market.

=== Sweet tomato sauce ===
The tomato sauce is seasoned with more oregano than other styles of pizza, and is sweeter, likely due to the influence of Sicilian immigrants upon Italian foods in St. Louis.

== See also ==
- Cuisine of the Midwestern United States
- Cuisine of St. Louis
- Pizza cheese
