= The Hill, St. Louis =

Neighborhood of St. Louis in Missouri, US

Coordinates: 38.617°N 90.278°W

The Hill
- Neighborhood of St. Louis
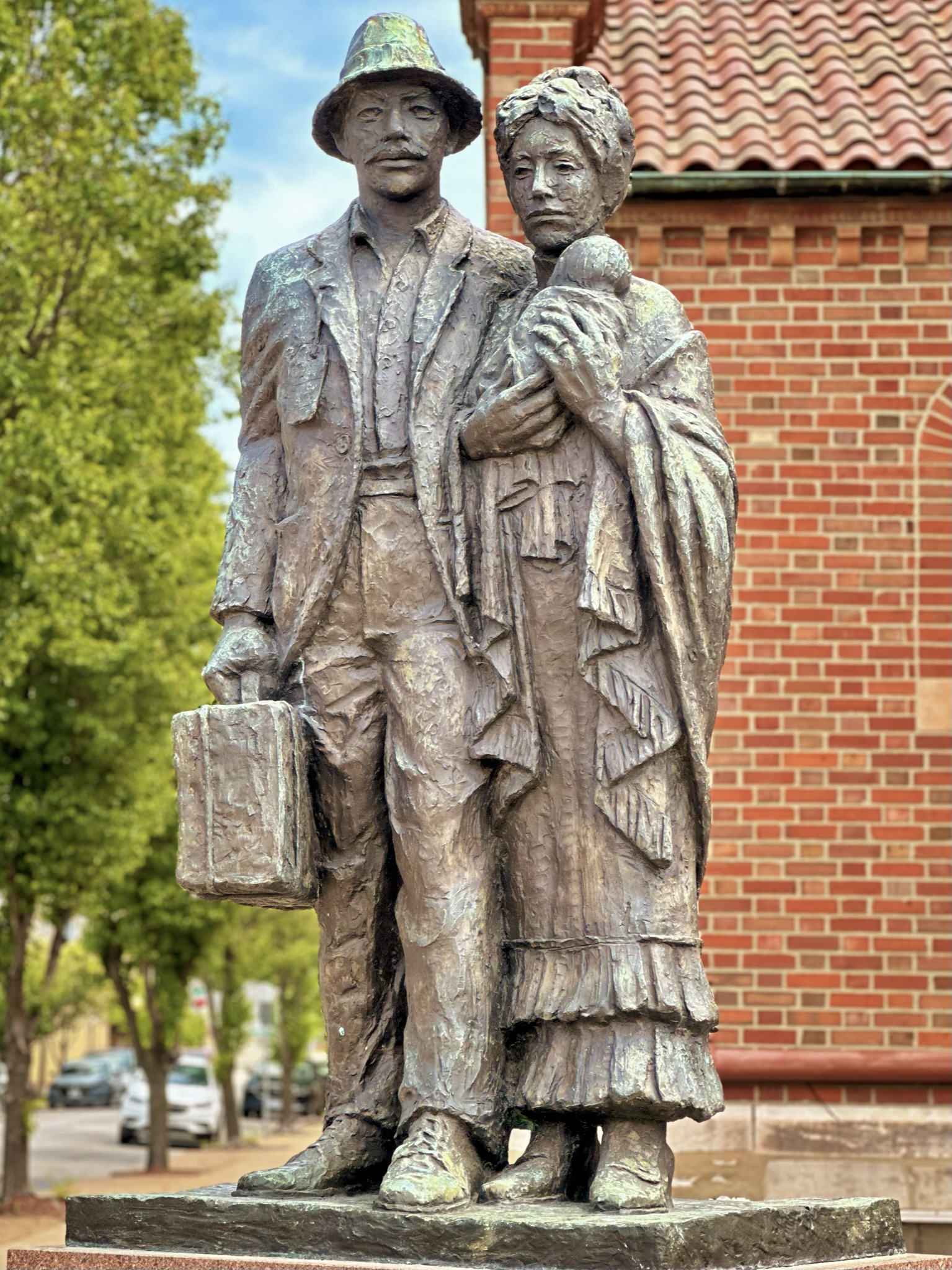
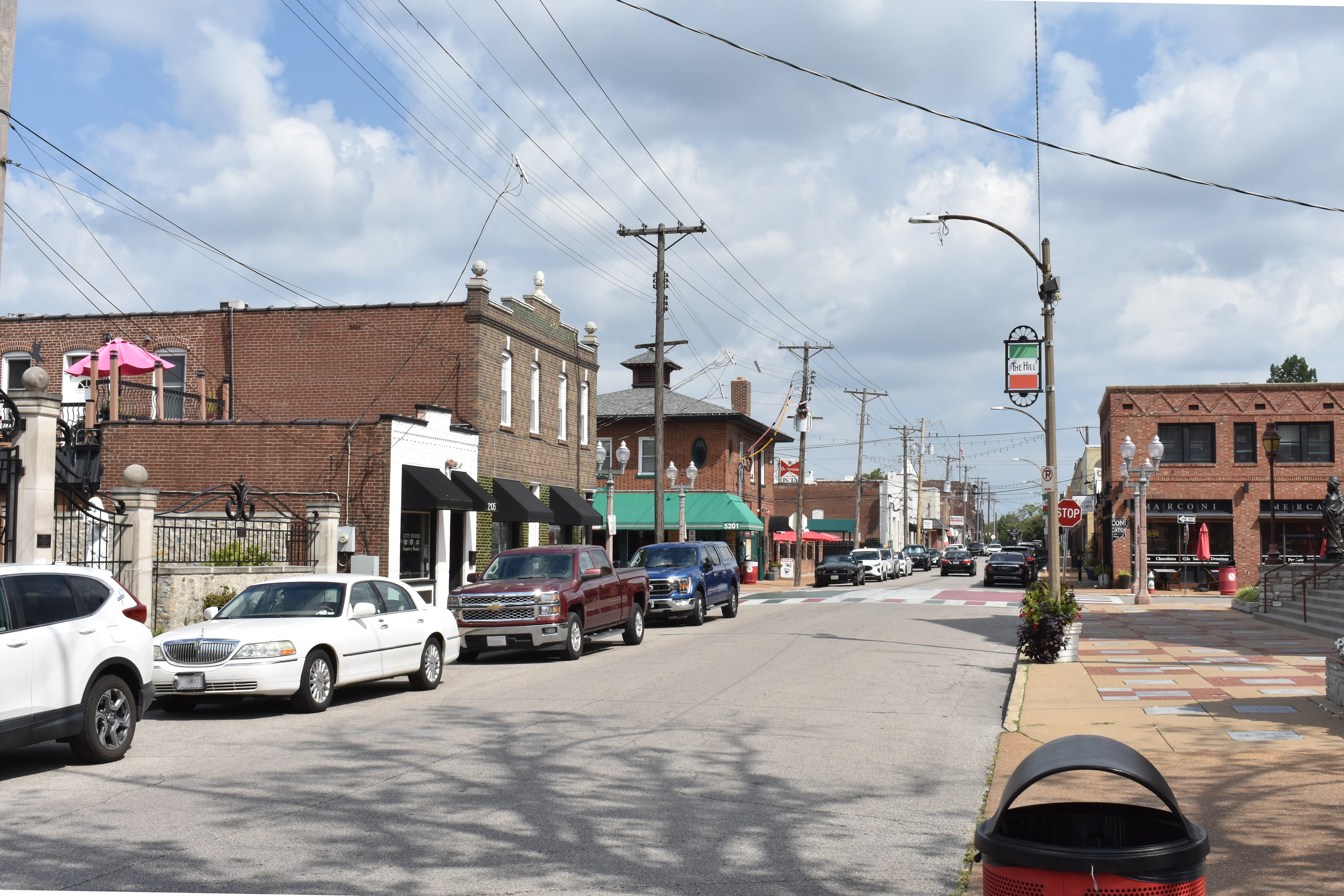
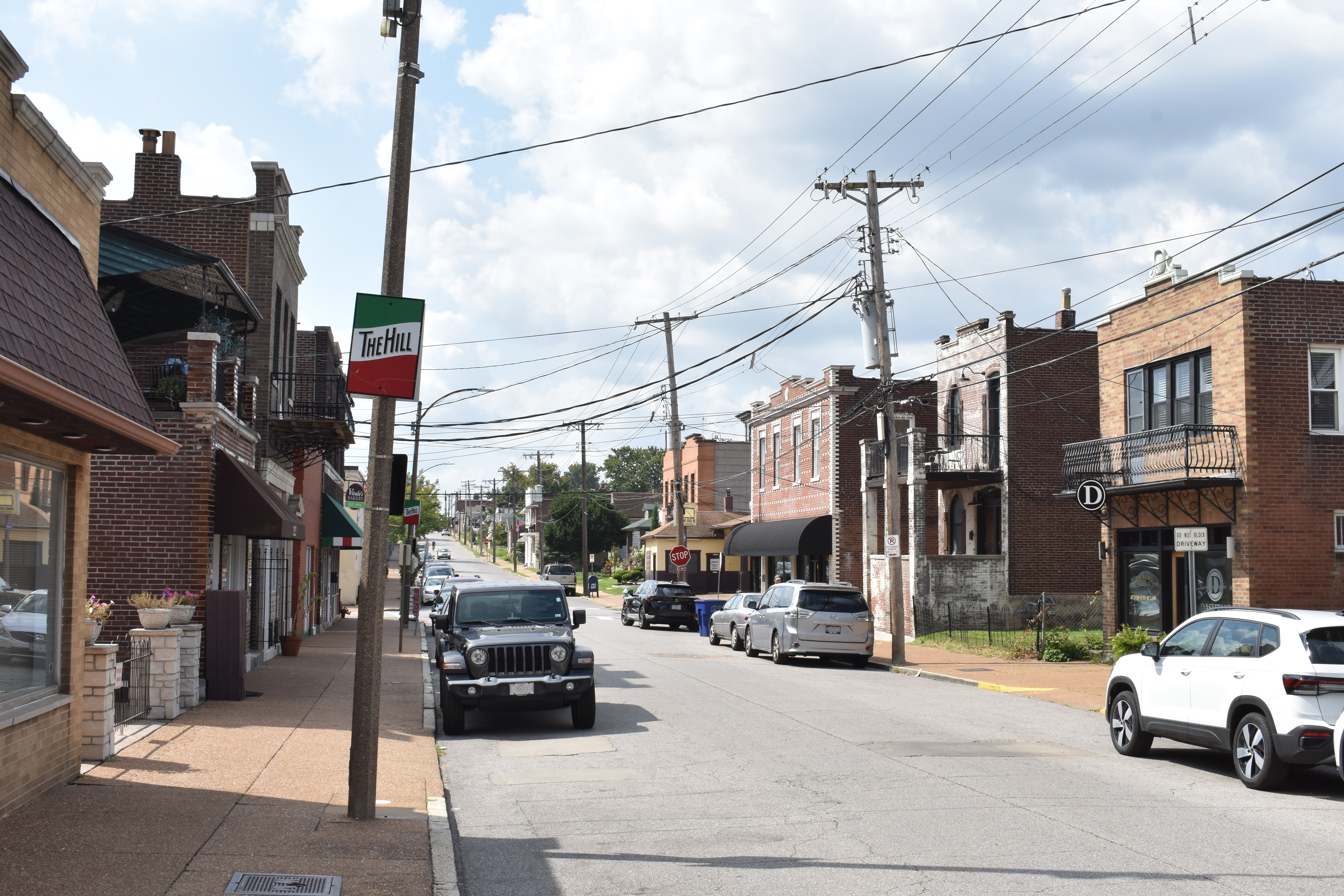
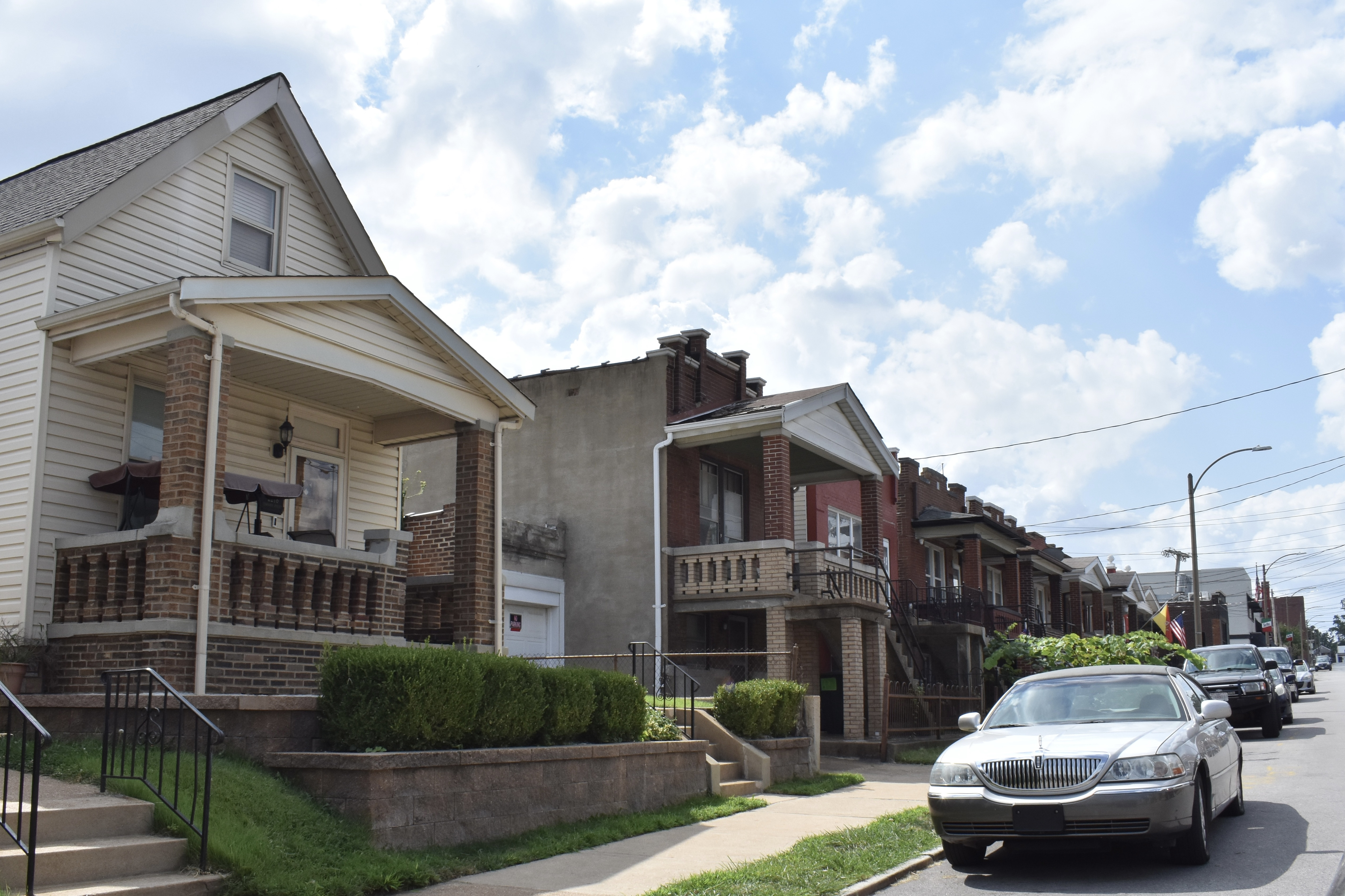
- “The Italian Immigrants” by Rudolph Edward Torrini Marconi Avenue, North Marconi Avenue, South Homes in The Hill

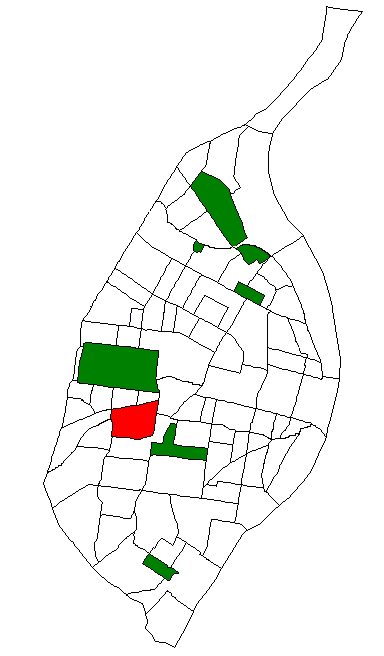
- Location (red) of The Hill within St. Louis
- Country: United States
- State: Missouri
- City: St. Louis
- Wards: 5

Government
  - Alderman: Matt Devoti

Area
  - Total: 0.97 sq mi (2.5 km^{2})

Population (2020)
  - Total: 2,487
  - Density: 2,600/sq mi (990/km^{2})
- ZIP Code: Part of 63110
- Area code: 314
- Website: stlouis-mo.gov

The Hill is a neighborhood in St. Louis, Missouri, located on high ground south of Forest Park. It is one of the largest Little Italy neighborhoods in the USA. The official boundaries of the neighborhood are Manchester Avenue (Route 100) on the north, Columbia and Southwest Avenues on the south, South Kingshighway Boulevard on the east, and Hampton Avenue on the west.

The Hill began with immigrants from Northern Italy, Germany, Ireland, and African-Americans who wanted to live near the railroad which connected the neighborhood to downtown. The vast numbers of northern Italians migrating to the area resulted in an Italian American majority population during the early part of the 20th century. Historically, it is a predominantly blue collar neighborhood.

Its name is due to its proximity to the highest point of the city, formerly named St. Louis Hill, which is outside the neighborhood's boundaries, a few blocks south, at the intersection of Arsenal Street and Sublette Avenue. The intersection borders Sublette Park, the former site of the Social Evil Hospital, where Josephine Baker was born. Adjacent to the park is the former St. Louis County Insane Asylum, which opened in 1869 and is now the St. Louis Psychiatric Rehabilitation Center.

== History ==
Historical population
Census	Pop.	Note	%±
1990	2,971		—
2000	2,648		−10.9%
2010	2,443		−7.7%
2020	2,487		1.8%

Various ethnic groups existed in the area in the mid-19th century. Italians, mainly from the north and especially from the northern Italian region of Lombardy, immigrated and settled in the area starting in the late 19th century, attracted by jobs in nearby plants established to exploit deposits of clay discovered by Irish immigrants in the 1830s.

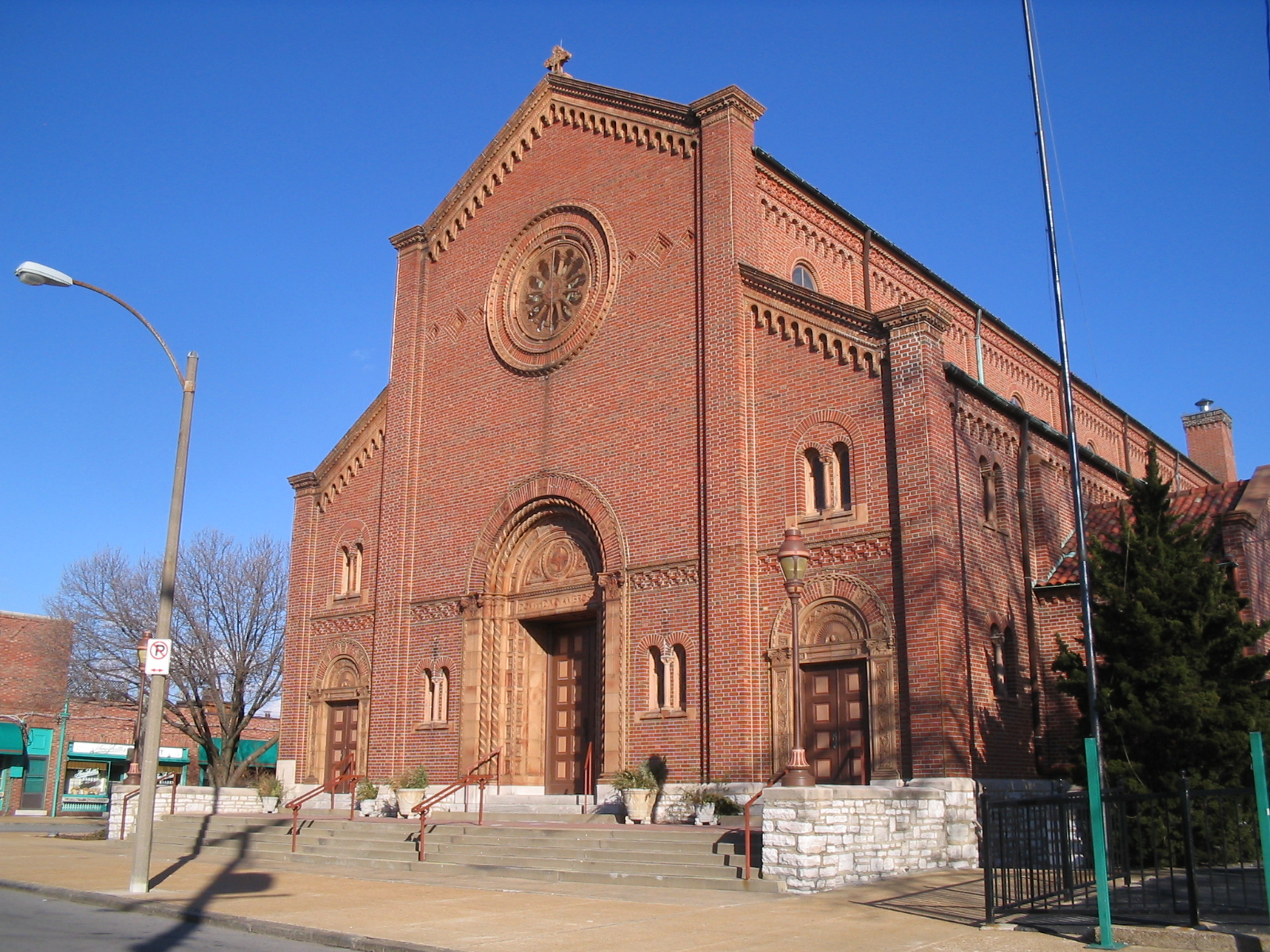
St. Ambrose Roman Catholic Church, the former Italian parish

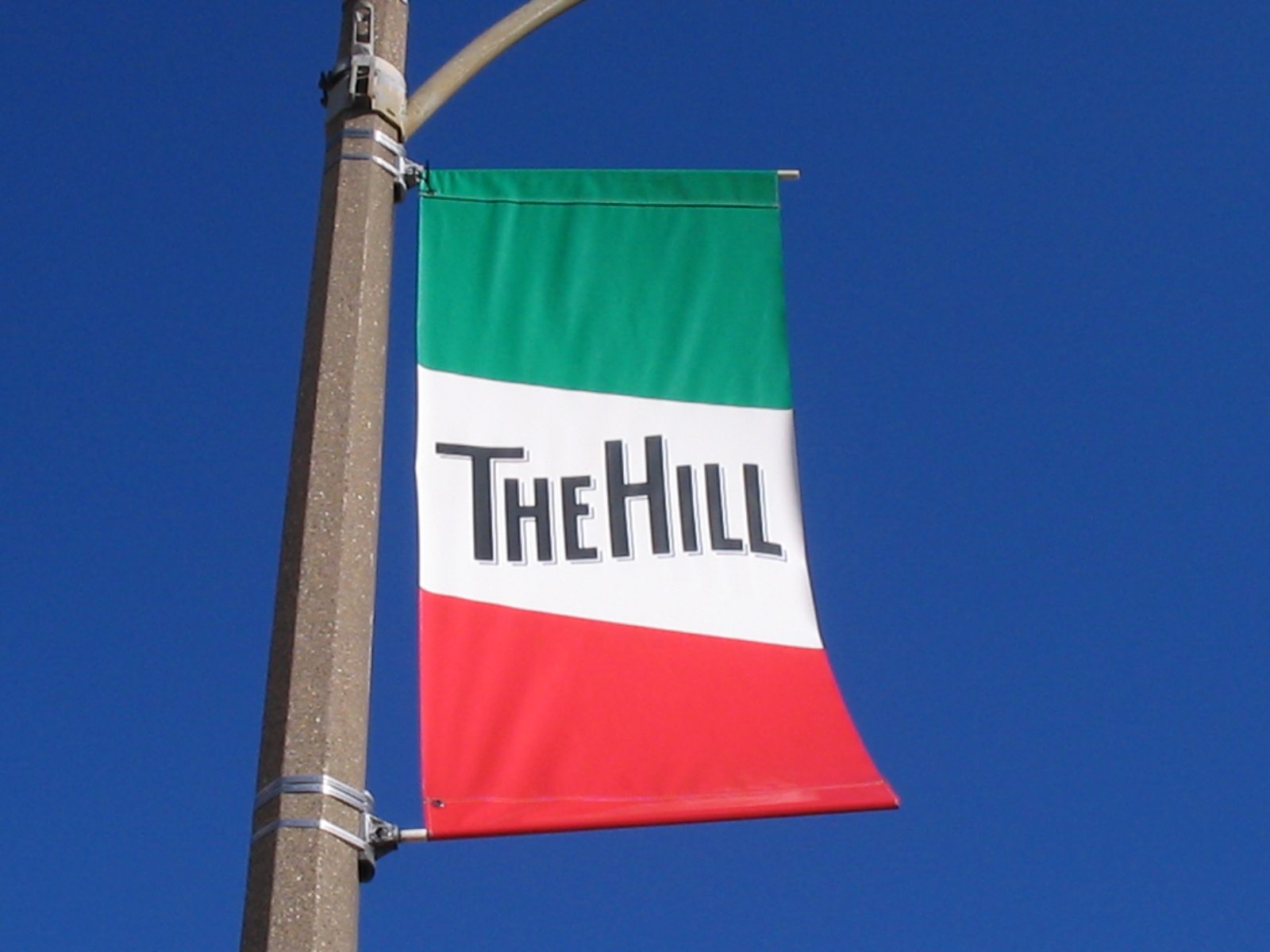
A banner posted throughout the neighborhood

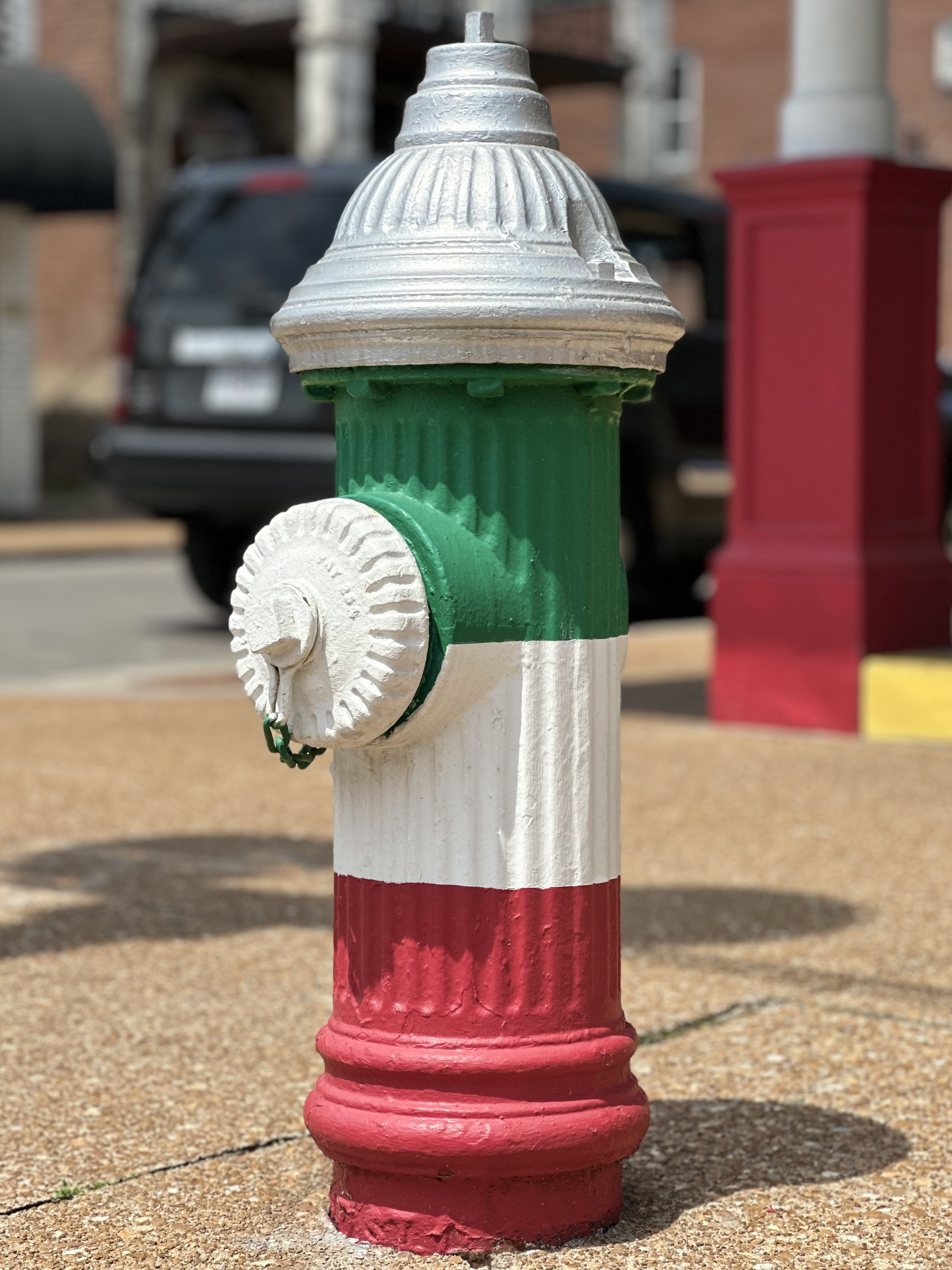
A fire hydrant painted with the colors of the Italian flag

Due to the increasing number of Italian speakers, the parish of St. Ambrose was founded by members of St. Aloysius Gonzaga Parish in what later came to be known as the Hill in 1903 to serve primarily the recent Lombard immigrants. After the first wooden church burned in 1921, a brick church was built in 1926. The structure, designed by architect Angelo Corrubia, was modeled after the Sant'Ambrogio Church in Milan, in a Lombard Romanesque Revival style of brick and terra cotta. Residents took pride in their parish and donated funds for the new church. It became a territorial parish of the Archdiocese of St Louis in 1955, after existing as a personal ethnic parish until that time.

Baseball greats Yogi Berra and Joe Garagiola grew up on the Hill; their boyhood homes are across the street from each other on Elizabeth Avenue. Four of the five St. Louisans on the US soccer team that defeated England in the 1950 FIFA World Cup came from The Hill, a story that is told in The Game of Their Lives, a book (ISBN 0-8050-3875-2) and 2005 film of the same title (released on DVD as The Miracle Match).

According to Garagiola's book Baseball Is a Funny Game, during his youth, the Hill was called "Dago Hill;" the term "dago" was a disparaging and offensive term used to refer to a person of Italian descent. The Hill was also well known to African-Americans, for during the era of Prohibition and bootlegging, the area had an African-American enclave that produced a number of blues songs that referenced The Hill. Other talent from The Hill includes Toni Carroll who made a singing career in New York in the 1950s and 1960s, appearing on Broadway and at the Copacabana. She appeared as a guest on The Tonight Show guest hosted by Garagiola and with special guest Yogi Berra. Hill native Ben Pucci played with the Cleveland Browns in the 1960s.

- In 1926, the blues singer Luella Miller recorded "Dago Hill Blues" about the area.
- In 1929, the pseudonymous blues singer Freezone recorded "Indian Squaw Blues" in which he sang, "I'm gonna buy me a mansion, I'm gonna live on Dago's Hill / So I can get my whiskey, honey, right from the still."
- In 1932, Tampa Red and Georgia Tom Dorsey sang of the Hill and its connection to illegal liquor in "You Can't Get That Stuff No More" – "stuff" being a reference to alcohol.
- In 1934, Charlie Patton mentioned the Hill in his single "Love My Stuff," a song in which "stuff" again means liquor.
- In 1935, the North Carolina blues musician Blind Boy Fuller made reference to the Hill in his song "Log Cabin Blues".

== Demographics ==
In 2020 The Hill's racial makeup was 90.4% White, 2.5% Black, 0.2% Native American, 1.1% Asian, 4.5% Two or More Races, and 1.2% Some Other Race. 3.3% of the people were of Hispanic or Latino origin.

On June 13, 2020, Black Lives Matter protests took place on the Hill. Reports surfaced that African-Americans were routinely being denied residency which has caused demonstrations and protests during the 2020 BLM riots. In 2020, total crime in the neighborhood has seen a 10.78% rise in crime, both property and violent.

== Native-born Italians in St. Louis ==
As of 2026, there are approximately 2,000 native-born Italians residing throughout the St. Louis metropolitan region with only one residing on The Hill. The Italian Community of St. Louis, an organization which promotes the Italian language and culture, has several popular events which include Carnevale which occurs in February and Ferragosto which occurs in August. The St. Louis Italian Language Program has its home on the Hill at Gateway Science Academy on Fyler Avenue. St Louis' Italian sister city is Bologna.

== Notable people ==
- Yogi Berra, (1925–2015) was a professional baseball catcher, manager, and coach who reached the Baseball Hall of Fame. In his 19 years in Major League Baseball, Berra was in 14 World Series, including 10 World Series championships. He played for the New York Yankees and New York Mets.
- Frank Borghi, (1925–2015) was a professional soccer player/goalkeeper for the USA national team.
- Charlie Colombo, (1920–1986) was a professional soccer player for the United States men's national soccer team.
- Frank Crespi, (1918-1990) was a professional baseball player. He was the first Hill resident to play on a World Series championship team (in 1942) and it happened to be for his hometown team, the St. Louis Cardinals,.
- Joe Garagiola, (1926–2016) was a professional baseball catcher, announcer and television host, popular for his colorful personality.
- Gino Pariani, (1928–2007) was a professional soccer striker for the United States men's national soccer team.

== See also ==
- Ozark Highlands AVA, winemaking region in Missouri started by Italian immigrants
- Cuisine of St. Louis
- Toasted ravioli, a local dish made from fried Italian ravioli
