= Mickey Walker (American football) =

American football player (1939–2014)

No. 65, 64
- Positions: Center, linebacker

Personal information
- Born: October 14, 1939; Petoskey, Michigan
- Died: July 19, 2014 (aged 74); Sault Ste. Marie, Michigan

Career information
- College: Michigan State
- AFL draft: 1961: 23rd round, 182nd overall pick

Career history
- New York Giants (1961–1966)

Career statistics
- Games played: 52
- Stats at Pro Football Reference

George Michael Walker (October 14, 1939 – July 19, 2014) was an American football center and linebacker in the National Football League. He played five seasons for the New York Giants (1961–1965) getting to the championship game and losing twice. Walker ended his career after getting injured in the pre-season for the Detroit Lions.

Walker attended East Detroit High School in Eastpointe, Michigan. While there he played football on a team that included Gary Ballman and Ron Kramer. He is famous for a play where an opposing team's player broke his nose and he returned into the game the next play and broke that player's leg. Walker is in the hall of fame at East Detroit High School for football. Walker played college football for Michigan State University where he is in the hall of fame for football.

After professional football, Walker went on to be a physical education teacher at Anchor Bay Elementary School and Anchor Bay Junior High School in New Baltimore, Michigan in the 1970s, 1980s, and 1990s. He also purchased the Little Country Club in Pearl Beach, Michigan and changed the name of the 9-hole golf course to Mickey Walker's Little Country Club.
