= Monique Owens =

American politician

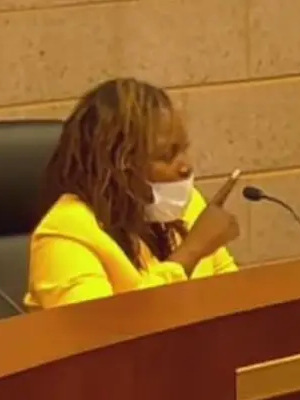

Mayor of Eastpointe, Michigan
- In office November 2019 – November 13, 2023
- Preceded by: Suzanne Pixley
- Succeeded by: Mike Klinefelt

Eastpointe City Council
- In office 2017–2019

Personal details
- Born: February 21, 1984 (age 42) Detroit, Michigan, U.S.
- Party: Republican (2022); Democratic (2022)
- Children: 2

Monique Owens (born February 21, 1984) is an American politician and convicted criminal who served as the mayor of Eastpointe, Michigan from 2019 to 2023. She previously served on the Eastpointe City Council from 2017 to 2019 and was the first African-American to serve in either office. She was unseated in the 2023 mayoral primary.

Her tenure as mayor was controversial and included a lawsuit alleging that she violated residents' First Amendment rights and a criminal conviction for making false statements on a grant application for her business. Residents also objected to police reports she made against critics, her failure to file financial disclosure statements, her heated tirades against residents and other officials during meetings, and her lack of support for the LGBT community.

On September 28, 2023, Owens pleaded no contest to a misdemeanor charge of making a false statement. The case, which was originally charged as felony false pretenses, stemmed from a COVID business relief application which stated that her business was 51 percent or more owned by veterans and had 100–249 employees. After paying $10,000 in restitution to the victim, she was sentenced to six months of probation, 100 hours of community service, and $725 in court costs.

== Biography ==
=== Early career ===
Owens started her career as a clerical employee with the Detroit Police Department and later served as a Wayne County Sheriff's deputy for 11 years. The Wayne County Sheriff's Office suspended Owens in 2010.

=== Political career ===
Owens moved from Clinton Township to Eastpointe in 2010.

==== City Council ====
In 2017, Owens was elected to the Eastpointe City Council, the first African-American to serve as councilperson in the city.

Earlier that year, the U.S. Department of Justice had filed a lawsuit alleging that the city's election of council members at-large violated the Voting Rights Act. The lawsuit was settled after Owens was elected to council and resulted in the city using ranked-choice voting for council elections beginning in 2019.

===== LGBT issues =====
Owens was the only council member to vote "no" on the city's Pride Month resolution in 2019, saying that Eastpointe has "always accepted everybody". After becoming mayor, she voted against similar resolutions in both 2020 and 2021. Owens did not attend the council meeting where the 2023 Pride Month resolution was voted on.

As mayor, Owens attended a Feb. 2020 speech by Louis Farrakhan which included anti-LGBT remarks.

==== Mayor ====
===== Election as Mayor =====
In 2019, incumbent mayor Suzanne Pixley did not file to run for re-election. On November 5, 2019, Owens was narrowly elected mayor with 32.5 percent of the vote in a five-way contest. She received 19 more votes than runner-up Mike Klinefelt.

===== Property tax exemptions =====
In July 2021, Owens applied for a poverty exemption from property taxes on her home in Eastpointe. The Eastpointe Board of Review later granted the mayor a 100 percent exemption from property taxes in 2021.

In 2022, Owens applied for a tax exemption again, but the Eastpointe Board of Review denied the exemption for 2022 on the grounds that her income exceeded the guidelines for a poverty exemption. Owens appealed the board's decision to the Michigan Tax Tribunal, which in February 2023 issued a judgment upholding the city's denial of the exemption. Paperwork submitted by Owens to the tribunal claimed that her annual income was less than $12,000. Judge Patricia Halm, however, noted that the testimony and evidence considered by the tribunal showed income of $43,695. Tax records reviewed by the Macomb Daily shortly after the decision showed that Owens owed $3,378 for summer and winter 2022 property taxes. On Feb. 28, 2023, Owens's 2022 property taxes were paid via two separate credit cards, according to city records.

In 2023, Owens applied for the tax exemption a third time. The board of review denied the request.

===== Candidate for Harper Woods city manager position =====
In 2021, Owens applied for the full-time city manager position in Harper Woods, Michigan. In September, the city extended Owens a conditional job offer, which she accepted on September 30. Owens expressed her intent to remain mayor of Eastpointe while working as city manager of Harper Woods. The following day, the mayor of Harper Woods announced that Owens did not meet the conditions of the contract. As a result, Owens did not receive the job.

===== Museum dispute =====
In October 2021, Eastpointe Community Schools board member Mary Hall-Rayford criticized Owens for her behavior at the Michigan Military Technical & Historical Society Museum. The Macomb Daily reported that Owens brought someone to tour the museum during hours when it was closed to the public and that she entered areas that were restricted to museum employees only. The museum is privately owned and operated but leases a building from the city. Museum staff also complained that Owens violated the museum's policy prohibiting beverages near the exhibits and that she refused to comply when reminded of the rule. MMTHS board member Wendy Richardson said that she filmed Owens' visit using a cell phone due to legal concerns. Owens objected to the recording and alleged that museum staff had violated her rights by filming her.

===== 2021 city election =====
In Eastpointe's 2021 general election, Owens endorsed Shenita Lloyd and Michael Jones for city council. Both candidates were defeated by Cardi DeMonaco, an incumbent, and Rob Baker, who had previously served a partial term on the council.

That same day, voters also approved a city charter amendment requiring the city to hold a mayoral primary if more than two candidates run for mayor in the same election.

===== Censure =====
The Eastpointe City Council voted 3-1 to censure Owens at its April 5, 2022, meeting.

===== 2022 Michigan Senate campaign =====
Owens filed on April 15 to run for the Republican nomination for state senate in the 11th district. Four days later, she withdrew from the Republican primary and filed to run in the Democratic primary in the same district.

On June 18, Owens attended the opening ceremonies of Cruisin' Gratiot, an annual car cruise hosted by a nonprofit in Eastpointe. As the ceremonies ended, Owens approached the microphone and spoke to the crowd against the organization's wishes. Harvey Curley, an 80 year-old longtime Cruisin' Gratiot board member who is also a city councilman, then confronted Owens. She later reported the incident to police, alleging that Curley had assaulted her. The Macomb County Sheriff’s Office dismissed the case.

Owens also filed for a personal protective order against Curley. On September 23, 2022, Macomb County Circuit Court Judge Rachel Rancilio denied Owens’s request, saying in her decision that no evidence was taken at the hearing that would demonstrate that Curley is dangerous.

The Detroit News endorsed Owens in the primary. The Detroit Free Press endorsed her opponent in the primary, citing Owens' "oddly malleable" values and expressing concern that she may switch her party affiliation again.

Owens lost the Democratic primary election to Veronica Klinefelt by a nearly two-to-one margin.

====== College degree discrepancy ======
During the 2022 state senate campaign, Owens claimed in a Ballotpedia candidate survey that she had a bachelor's degree in political science. The Macomb Daily, however, reported that she had a bachelor's degree in criminal justice.

===== 2022 city council walkout and First Amendment lawsuit =====
In 2022, Owens was named as a defendant in a federal lawsuit alleging that she violated the civil rights of four constituents by interrupting or censoring their remarks during public comment time at council meetings.

At the council's September 6, 2022, meeting, Owens repeatedly interrupted and talked over residents during the public comment section of the meeting, objecting that speakers may not discuss a police matter involving Owens and another council member, Harvey Curley. The city's attorney advised the council that they may not restrict a speaker's subject matter, except for racial accusations and similar remarks. When Owens continued to interrupt subsequent speakers and raise her voice, all four council members walked out in protest, leaving Owens alone at the table and effectively ending the meeting.

On November 9, 2022, the Foundation for Individual Rights and Expression (FIRE) filed suit in the U.S. District Court in Detroit, naming Owens and the City of Eastpointe as defendants. The lawsuit alleges that Owens violated the First and Fourteenth Amendment rights of four residents who attempted to speak during public comment periods at meetings by shouting them down, berating them, and otherwise preventing them from speaking. In addition to the three plaintiffs who attempted to speak during the public comment period of the September 6 meeting, a fourth plaintiff alleged similar treatment during a March 2022 meeting. The lawsuit further alleged that Owens frequently uses her authority “to suppress dissent and criticism by interrupting and shouting down members of the public who criticize her or raise subjects she finds personally embarrassing”. The lawsuit's stated purpose is to “stop Mayor Owens’s abuse of authority”.

On December 8, 2022, a federal judge issued a preliminary injunction, which the City agreed to, prohibiting Owens from shouting down speakers or restricting the subject matter of their remarks. The order is to remain in effect until the case is resolved or the court orders otherwise.

===== Ethics board decision on missing financial disclosures =====
On December 13, 2022, the Eastpointe Board of Ethics voted 3-0 (with one abstention) to verify a resident's ethics complaint against Owens which alleged that she had failed to file annual financial disclosures required under the city's ethics ordinance. At the time of the complaint, Owens had not filed a disclosure form since 2017.

On January 30, 2023, the Ethics Board directed the city manager to issue a formal letter to Owens requesting that she submit her annual disclosure statements for 2021 and 2022 within 30 days. The board was unable to take action for missing disclosures prior to 2021 due to the ordinance's statute of limitations.

===== Criminal charge for COVID grant fraud =====
On March 9, 2023, Owens was arraigned on a felony charge of false pretenses in 41B District Court. The Macomb County Prosecutor's Office alleged that she fraudulently applied for a COVID relief grant for her business and received $10,000 from the program. Owens is accused of fraudulently stating that her business was 51 percent or more owned by veterans and had 100–249 employees. The warrant authorization request stated that Owens “has never served at any capacity in any of the armed forces, and according to state unemployment records has zero employees other than herself".

Owens waived her right to a preliminary examination and on July 17 was bound over to the 16th Judicial Circuit Court for a July 31 arraignment.

On September 28, 2023, Owens pleaded no contest to a misdemeanor charge of making a false statement. As part of the plea agreement, she was required to pay $10,000 in restitution to the victim. Sentencing was originally scheduled for October 10 but was delayed until November 9. In response to remarks made by Owens at sentencing, Judge Jennifer Faunce questioned the defendant's remorsefulness and suggested that she was grandstanding. Owens could have received a sentence of up to one year in jail but was ultimately sentenced to six months of probation, 100 hours of community service, and $725 in court costs.

===== Unseating as mayor in 2023 primary election =====
Owens faced three challengers in her 2023 bid for reelection. She was unseated in the primary as she failed to win a place among the top two vote getters. She received 14.1% percent of the vote. Mike Klinefelt and Mary Hall-Rayford, one of the plaintiffs in the civil rights lawsuit against Owens, proceeded to the general election.

In the general election, Klinefelt defeated Hall-Rayford. Klinefelt succeeded Owens as mayor on November 13, 2023.

In her final speech as mayor, Owens compared herself to Jesus and complained of being abandoned by people who had supported her.

=== Personal life ===
Owens has twin daughters, Kameron and Kayden. She is a Christian, but said in a 2021 city council meeting that she does not celebrate Christmas. In 2022, she authored a children's book titled Mom, What's a Mayor?

== See also ==
- List of first African-American mayors
