= Matt Hernandez =

American football player (born 1961)

No. 69, 60
- Position: Offensive tackle

Personal information
- Born: October 16, 1961 (age 65); Detroit, Michigan, U.S.
- Listed height: 6 ft 6 in (1.98 m)
- Listed weight: 260 lb (118 kg)

Career information
- High school: East Detroit (Eastpointe, Michigan)
- College: Purdue
- NFL draft: 1983: 8th round, 210th overall pick

Career history
- Seattle Seahawks (1983); Minnesota Vikings (1984); Seattle Seahawks (1986)*
- * Offseason or practice squad member only

Awards and highlights
- Second-team All-Big Ten (1982)

Career NFL statistics
- Games played: 21
- Games started: 1
- Stats at Pro Football Reference

Matthew J. Hernandez (born October 16, 1961) is an American former professional football player who was an offensive tackle for two seasons with the Seattle Seahawks and Minnesota Vikings of the National Football League (NFL). He played college football for the Purdue Boilermakers and was selected by the Seahawks in the eighth round of the 1983 NFL draft.

== Early life and college ==
Hernandez attended East Detroit High School in Eastpointe, Michigan.

He lettered for the Purdue Boilermakers of Purdue University from 1980 to 1982. He earned second-team All-Big Ten honors his senior year in 1982.

== Professional career ==
Hernandez was selected by the Seattle Seahawks with the 210th pick in the 1983 NFL Draft. He played in eight games, starting one, for the Seahawks during the 1983 season. He was released by the Seahawks on August 28, 1984.

Hernandez signed with the Minnesota Vikings on September 12, 1984. He played in thirteen games for the Vikings in 1984. Hernandez left Vikings training camp in 1985.
