= Eastpointe High School =

Coordinates: 42.464°N 82.962°W

Location
- 15501 Couzens; Eastpointe, Michigan 48021; United States

Information
- School type: Public high school
- School district: Eastpointe Community Schools
- Teaching staff: 32.87 (FTE)
- Grades: 8–12
- Enrollment: 624 (2024–2025)
- Student to teacher ratio: 18.98
- Campus type: Suburb
- Colors: Green and white
- Mascot: Shamrock
- Website: www.eastpointeschools.org/eastpointe-high-school/

Eastpointe High School (formerly known as East Detroit High School) is a high school in Eastpointe, Michigan, United States. It serves students in grades 9–12 for the Eastpointe Community Schools district. The school district (of which this is the sole comprehensive high school) includes most of Eastpointe and a portion of Warren.

== History ==
The district voted to change the name on May 23, 2017, from East Detroit High School to Eastpointe High School, 24-years after the city of East Detroit officially changed its name to Eastpointe on July 1, 1992.

== Notable alumni ==
- Woody Brown, actor on Flamingo Road
- Matt Hernandez, football player
- Ron Kramer, multi-sport college athlete and professional football player
- Misty Lee, voice actress, comedian, activist and magician
- Jerry M. Linenger, former NASA astronaut
- Kevin Lepine, hypnotist and Las Vegas headliner
