= Eaton Academy =

Charter school in Eastpointe, Michigan

Coordinates: 42.4561°N 82.9576°W

- Eastpointe, Michigan; United States

Information
- School type: Charter school
- Grades: Pre-K - Grade 8 Founded by Gary Wayne Pedersen as The Adventure School
- Affiliation: Central Michigan University

Eaton Academy is a PreK-8 charter school in Eastpointe, Michigan.

It is located in the former St. Veronica School building. As of 2011 90% of its students come from Detroit. During that time 86% of the students were at or below the U.S. federal government's poverty level, making Eaton a Title I school. It is much smaller than most area public schools. It is included (as of February 2024) in the list of schools 'authorized; and supported by Central Michigan University.
