= Brick cheese =

American medium-soft cheese

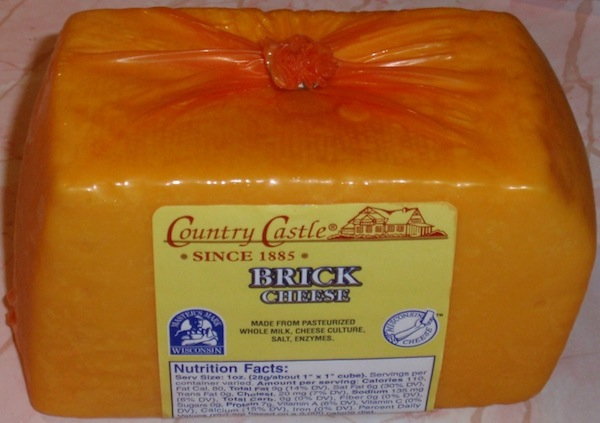
A package of brick cheese

Brick cheese is a cheese originating in Wisconsin, United States, made in brick-shaped form due to (originally) using actual bricks to form the shape. The color ranges from pale yellow to white with an orange rind. When unaged, this cheese has a sweet, mild flavor and is suitable for melting; after aging it has a stronger smell and a nuttier taste.

== Origins ==
Brick cheese was originally produced in Wisconsin beginning in 1877. The cheese-making process was derived from white American Cheddar that is cultured at a slightly higher temperature, which results in a marginally higher fat content and a slightly altered protein structure. The resultant "brick cheese" has a slightly softer texture.

=== Culturing ===
Brevibacterium linens grows on the surface of brick cheese, making it surface-ripened. Brevibacterium linens is also the bacterium responsible for the aging of Limburger cheese and many French cheese varieties. Cheesemakers often refer to the growth of the bacteria as a "smear" and this process is known as smear-ripening. This is reflected in the Brevibacterium's species name linens which is Latin for 'besmearing'.

The cheese is placed on wooden shelves, then gets washed with a whey-and-water mixture and turned. It can stay in cold storage up to five months, and is considered ready for consumption after two weeks have passed.

== Regulations ==
The US Code of Federal Regulations defines what the fat and moisture content of brick cheese must be. This standard of identity does not take into account that brick cheese should be surface-ripened with B. linens.

== Applications ==
Brick cheese is the traditional cheese for Detroit-style pizza.

== See also ==
- List of cheeses
