= Detroit-style pizza =

Rectangular pan pizza with a thick crust

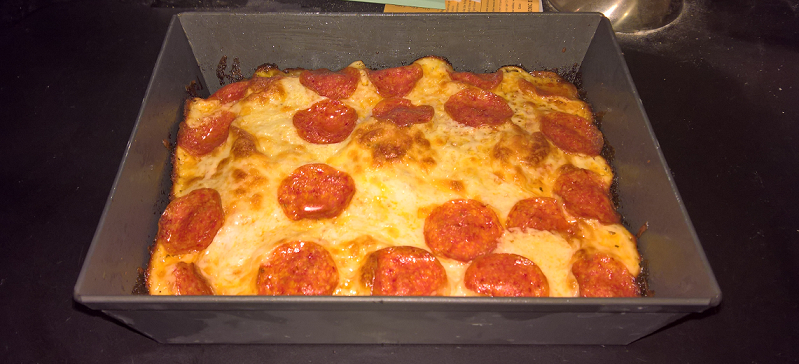
- Pizza in a traditional-style pan
- Type: Pizza
- Place of origin: United States
- Region or state: Detroit, Michigan, U.S.
- Main ingredients: Pizza dough, tomato sauce, brick cheese

Detroit-style pizza is a rectangular pan pizza with a thick, crisp, chewy crust. It is traditionally topped to the edges with mozzarella or Wisconsin brick cheese, which caramelizes against the high-sided heavyweight rectangular pan. Detroit-style pizza was originally baked in rectangular steel trays designed for use as automotive drip pans or to hold small industrial parts in factories. It was developed during the mid-20th century in Detroit, Michigan, before spreading to other parts of the United States in the 2010s. It is one of Detroit's most famous local foods.

== Description ==
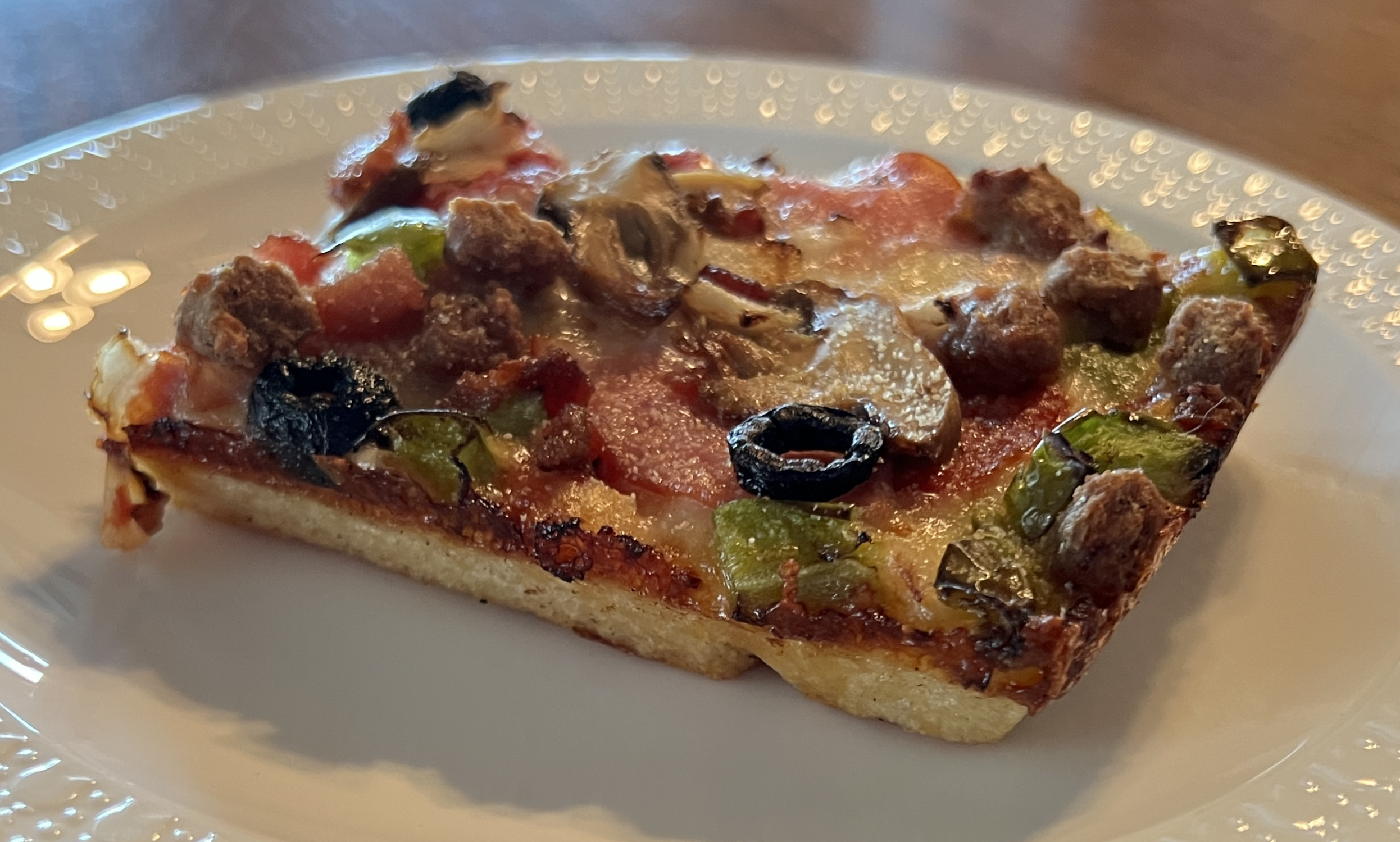
Slice of Detroit-style pizza with open, porous chewy crust

Detroit-style pizza is a rectangular pizza topped with Wisconsin brick cheese and a cooked tomato-based sauce. The dough typically has a hydration level of 70 percent or higher, which creates an open, porous, chewy crust with a crisp exterior. The fresh dough is double-proofed and stretched by hand to the pan corners. When seasoning new steel pans, they usually need to be dry-baked using 10–18 ounces (280–510 grams) of dough per pan. Randazzo says that the crust should be about 1 1/2 inches (40 millimeters) thick for true Detroit-style pizza. The buttery flavor of the crust results from a small quantity of oil and the melting properties of the mozzarella and Wisconsin brick cheeses. Shield's Pizza describes the importance of the sauce for flavor and how quality is ensured by consistently baking pizza for 13 minutes at 440 °F (225 °C). Loui's Pizza places the pepperoni first, underneath almost one pound of brick cheese and then bakes the pizza at 700 °F (370 °C). The brick cheese can withstand the heat due to the heavy butterfat content.

Pepperoni is sometimes placed directly on the crust, and other toppings may go directly on top of the cheese with the cooked sauce optionally as the final layer, applied in dollops or in "racing stripes", two or three lines of sauce. Some recipes call for the sauce to be added after the pizza comes out of the oven. The style is sometimes referred to as "red top" because the sauce is the final topping.

The cheese is spread to the edges and caramelizes against the high-sided heavyweight rectangular pan, giving the crust a lacy, crispy edge. This edge, known as frico, is the crispy caramelized cheese that runs along the edges of Detroit-style pizzas. According to the trade journal Pizza Today, "The key to this pizza is the delicious caramelized cheese that melts down the interior walls of the pan".

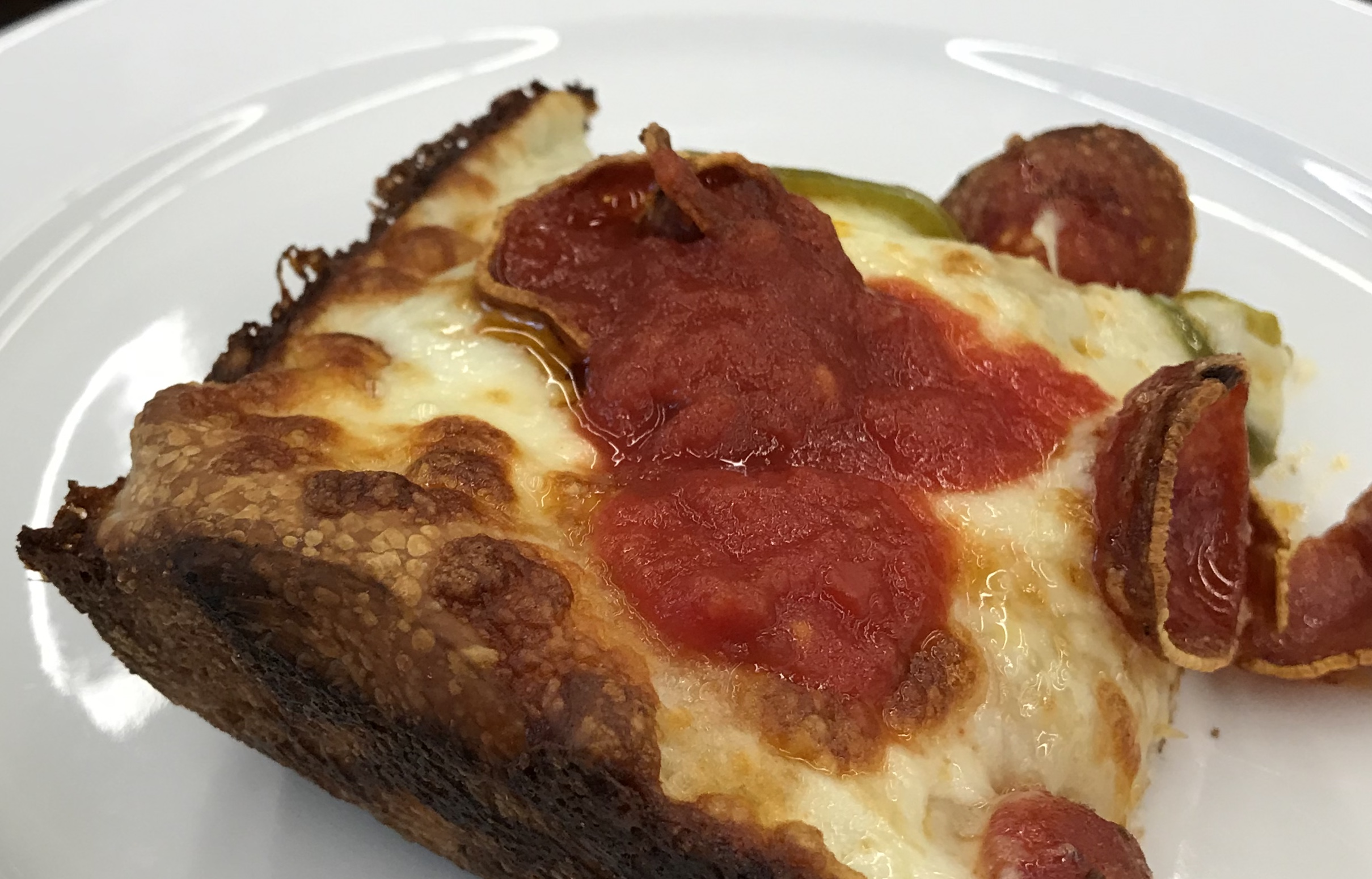
Detroit-style pizza showing typical lacy cheese crust edge with sauce on top

== History ==
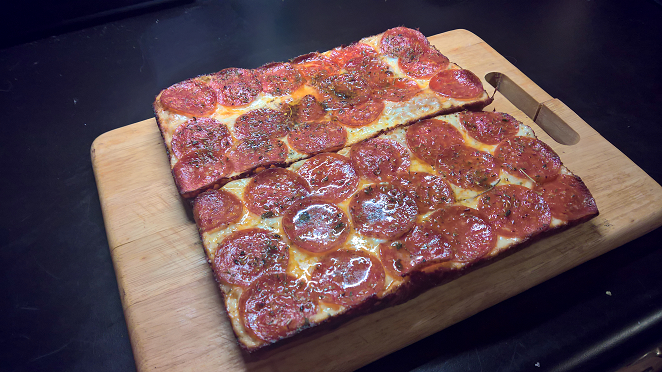
Detroit-style thick crust pizza

Detroit-style pizza was developed in 1946 at Buddy's Rendezvous, a former speakeasy owned by Gus and Anna Guerra located at the corner of Six Mile Road and Conant Street in Detroit. Historical accounts attribute the original Sicilian-style base either to Anna Guerra's mother's recipe for sfincione or a recipe from one of the restaurant's employees, a Sicilian woman named Connie Piccinato. The recipe created a "focaccia-like crust" and the restaurant baked it in blue steel pans available from local automotive suppliers because baking pans available at the time were not appropriate for the dish. The steel pans were made by Dover Parkersburg in the 1930s and 1940s and were originally used as drip trays or to hold small parts or scrap metal in automobile factories. Some 50- to 75-year-old pans are still in use.

The restaurant was later renamed Buddy's Pizza. In 1953, the Guerras sold it and opened Cloverleaf Bar in Eastpointe, Michigan. Former Buddy's employee Louis Tourtois made pizzas at Shield's before founding Loui's Pizza in Hazel Park, Michigan. The Detroit News called Tourtois the "king of pizzas" in 1978. National chain Jet's, local chain Shield's, and Luigi's the Original of Harrison Township are other locally-notable restaurants serving the style.

Buddy's Pizza chief brand officer Wesley Pikula, who started at Buddy's as a busboy in the 1980s, said that he had never heard the term "Detroit-style" before the 1980s when a trade magazine used it and that even afterward it was seldom used except in national trade articles. As late as 2007, some local media were referring to the style as "Sicilian-style". Some makers of Detroit-style pizza in other areas questioned whether to call their pizza by that name, as "sometimes people have negative thoughts about Detroit."

The Detroit-style pizza was popular throughout the Detroit area but until the 2010s was not often found at restaurants outside the area. In 2011 two Detroit brothers, Zane and Brandon Hunt, opened a Detroit-style pizza restaurant in Austin, Texas, named Via 313, using the "Detroit-style" name as a point of differentiation. In 2012, a New York restaurateur created a pizza he called "Detroit-style", though he had never visited Detroit, using focaccia dough, mozzarella, and ricotta.

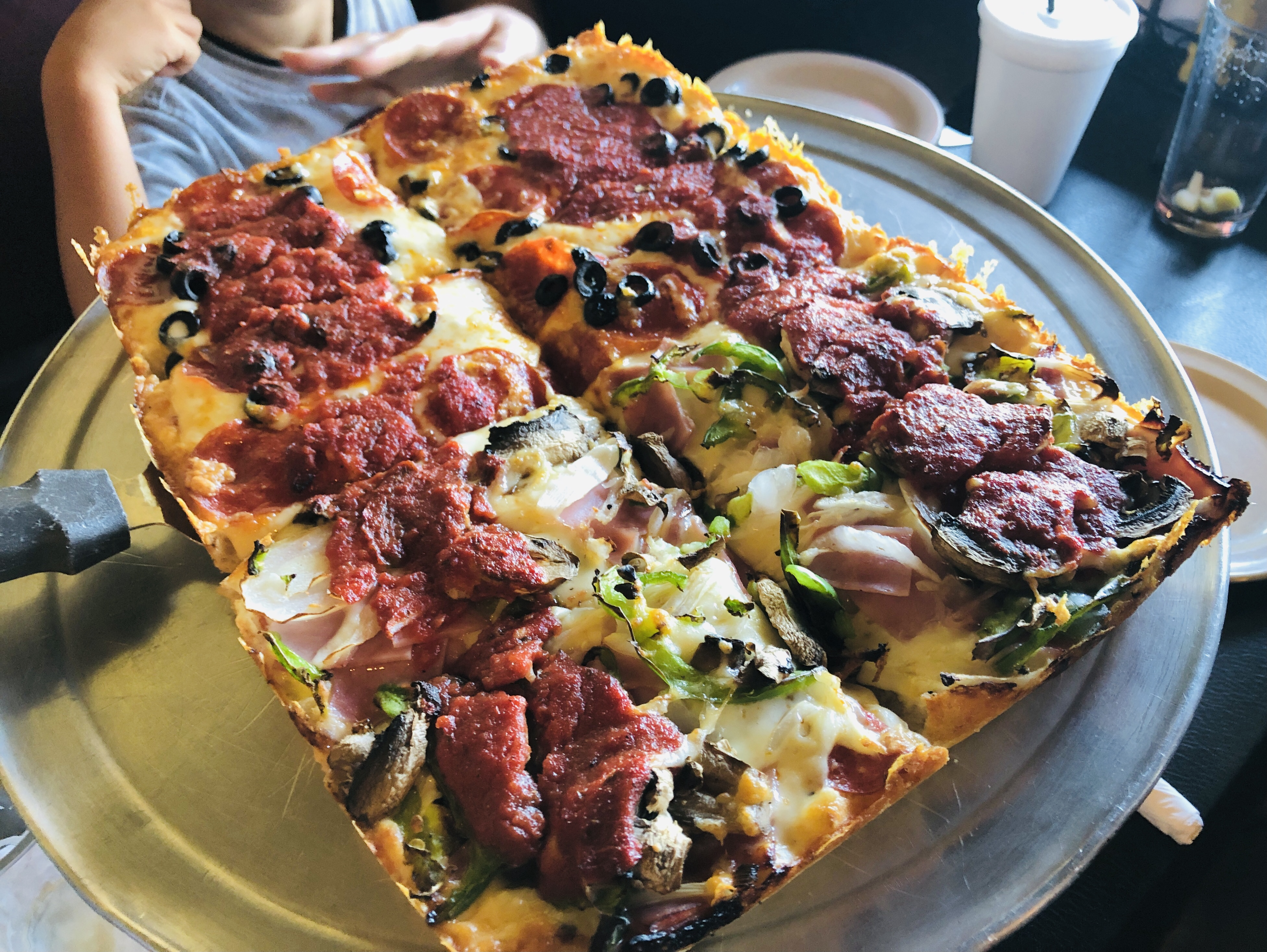
Detroit-style pizza with "racing stripe" sauce placed on top of the toppings

In 2012, local restaurant cook Shawn Randazzo won the Las Vegas International Pizza Expo world championship with a Detroit-style pizza, and according to pizza educator Tony Gemignani, the reaction was immediate. "After he won, I must have had six phone calls from operators, from guys who are big in the industry, saying, 'Give me a recipe for Detroit. How do I figure this out?'"

According to Serious Eats, "in early 2016 or so, everyone seemed to be talking about it or writing about it or opening up restaurants devoted to it." Trade journal Pizza Today wrote in 2018 that "Perhaps no pizza style has entered the public consciousness in quite the way that Detroit-style pan pizza has." Trade journal Restaurant Hospitality said the style had become popular on Instagram.

In 2019, Esquire called the style "one of the hottest food trends across America", while Detroit News proclaimed "Detroit style is sturdier than those floppy New York slices and easier to munch than Chicago's super deep-dish pies. With the sauce on the top, as is often the technique, the crust of Detroit's style doesn't get soggy and the cheese stays anchored to the rim all the way to the last crispy bite". Both the Detroit Free Press and Eater said Detroit-style pizza was "having its moment". Eater wrote that pizzerias offering the style were spreading across the US, but that the new pizzas were different:

On one side are the local Detroit pizzerias and restaurants devoted to their normcore, family-restaurant roots with toppings directly on the crust, a layer of processed brick cheese, and sauce on top. Then there are the "artisanal" square pizzas, with their aged doughs, organic toppings, unprocessed cheeses, and "frico" crust. These designer square slices are sometimes baked in a wood-fired oven and often served on Instagrammable metal trays in perfect lighting—a departure from the checkered tablecloths, no-frills boat drinks, and generous displays of bocce ball plaques at Buddy's. And in this new era of Detroit-style pizza, it's this photogenic version that many Americans are discovering first.

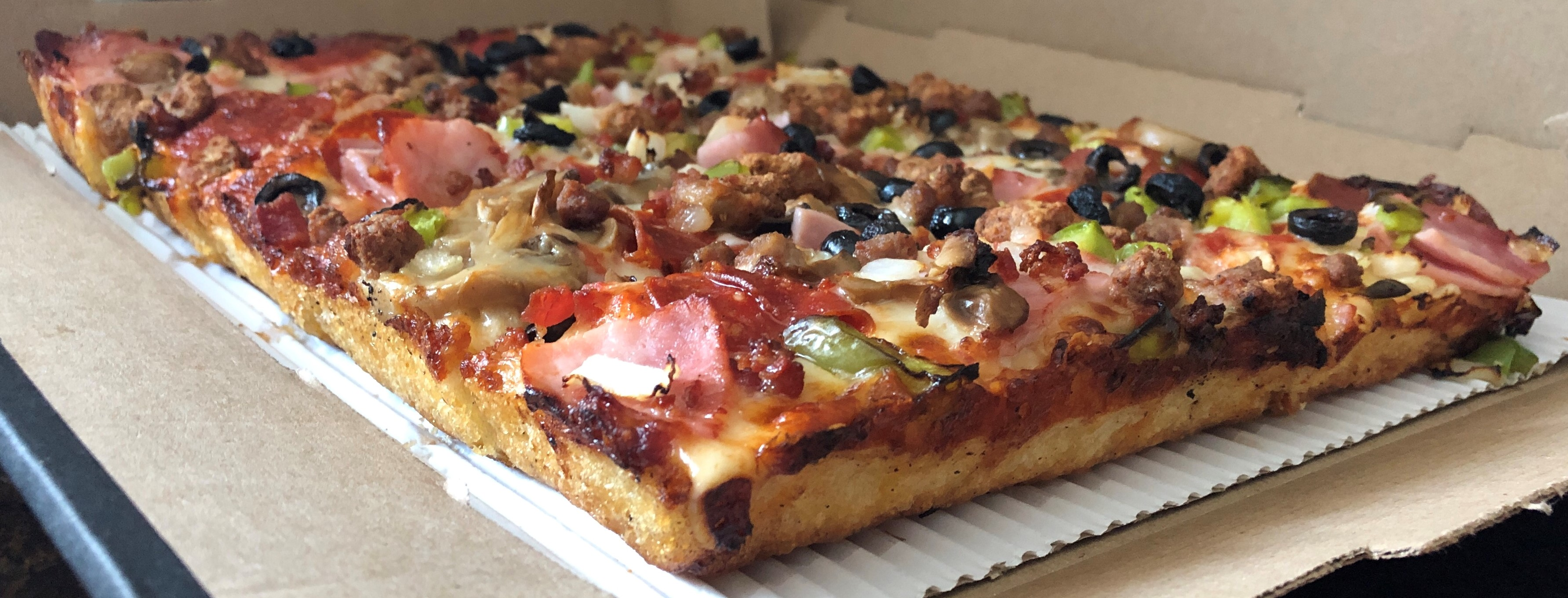
Detroit-style pizza showing sauce on top of some of the toppings, lacy cheese crust, and cheese to the edge

Eater said the artisanal trend was slow to catch on in Detroit. Along with the Coney Island hot dog and the Boston cooler, the traditional Detroit-style is one of Detroit's iconic local foods.

According to a 2021 forecast report, Yelp.com noted that Detroit-style pizza was national and reported that reviews mentioning "Detroit-style pizza" were up 52%. In 2023, Detroit-based author Karen Dybis published Detroit-Style Pizza: A Doughtown History covering three waves of Detroit-style pizza, ranging from the original innovators up through current pizzerias around the country.

== Reception ==
GQ food critic Alan Richman included Buddy's Pizza and Luigi's the Original among his 2009 list of 25 best pizzas in the USA. A Detroit-style pizza made by Randazzo, who was then working at Cloverleaf, won the 2012 Las Vegas International Pizza Expo world championship. The Chicago Tribune reviewed Jet's Pizza in 2013 and rated it very highly. In 2019, The Daily Meal named Buddy's the best pizza in Michigan. The Detroit Free Press named the Cloverleaf its Classic Restaurant of 2020.

In 2020, four Detroit-area restaurants, Buddy's, Supino Pizzeria, Loui's Pizza, and Cloverleaf Pizza, were listed in the 101 Best Pizzas in America by The Daily Meal. Pizza Today named Via 313, one of the leading Detroit-style pizza shops in the country, its "Independent Pizzeria of the Year" in 2020. Plate mentions that "The chewy crust, crispy cheese corners, and hearty meal of a slice fits precisely with what customers want right now: rich, satisfying comfort to-go." The Palm Beach Post describes how within minutes, a Delray Beach, Florida, bakery with a Detroit-style pizza pop-up store sells out its takeout pizza that is ordered online at noon on a Monday for pickup on the following Sunday. A writer for Delish originally from Chicago and now based in New York City provided a positive review in an article correspondingly entitled "What Is Detroit-Style Pizza? It's Way Better Than Your Deep Dish or New York Slice".

In 2025, the Detroit Free Press reviewed Hungry Howie's version of Detroit-style pizza, noting its adherence to key characteristics of the style while evaluating its execution as a national chain offering.

== See also ==
- Cuisine of the Midwestern United States § Detroit
- List of pizza varieties by country
- Pan pizza
