= Buddy's Pizza =

Independent Detroit-based pizza restaurant chain

Coordinates: 42°25′08.3″N 83°03′50.7″W

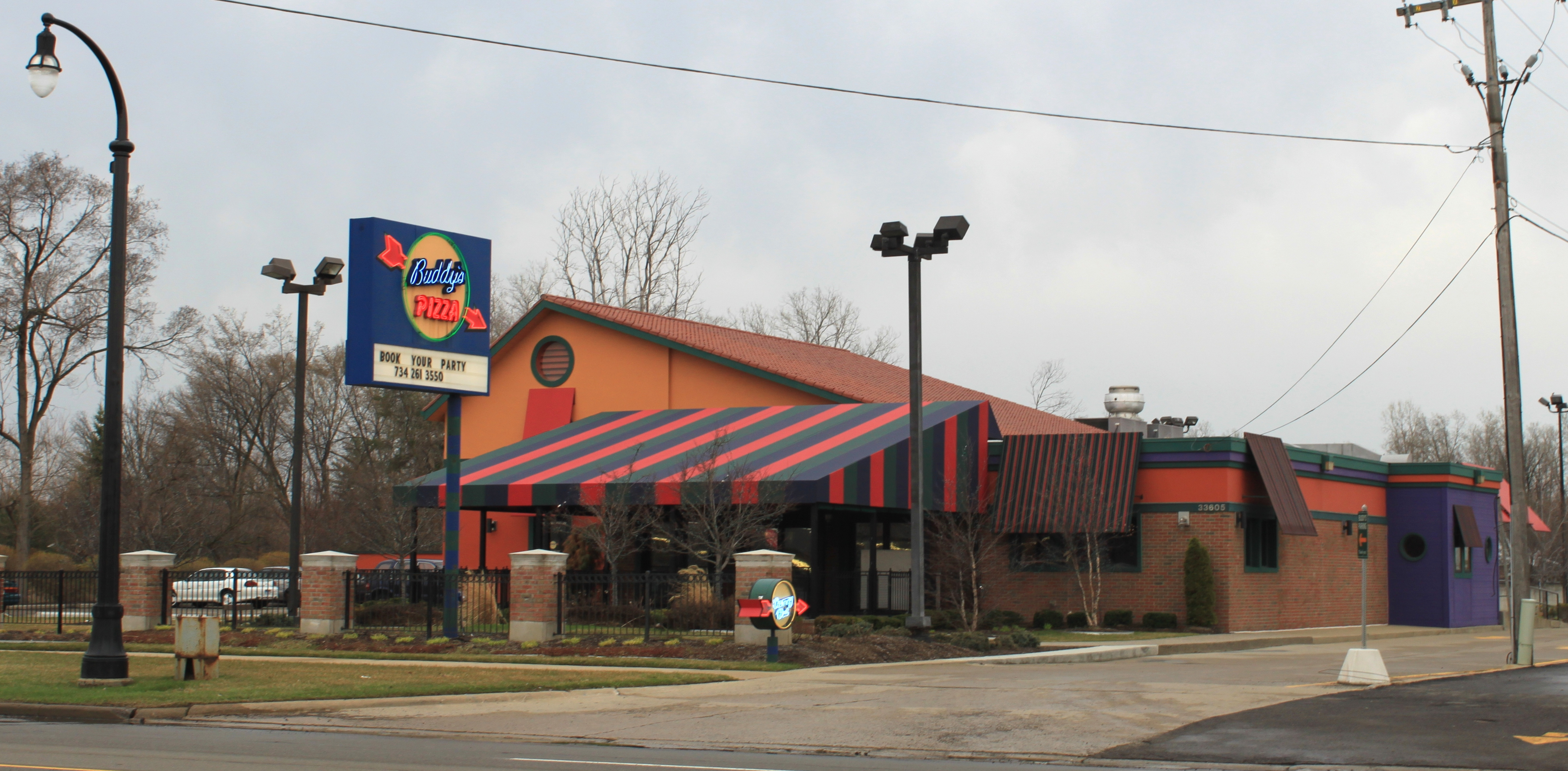
- Buddy's Pizza in Livonia
- Interactive map of Buddy's Pizza

Restaurant information
- Established: 1946; 80 years ago
- Owner: Capital Spring (private equity group)
- Food type: American, Italian
- Other information: Founder: Gus Guerra
- Website: buddyspizza.com

Buddy's Pizza is an independent pizza restaurant chain based in Detroit, Michigan. Founded in 1946, the company has an annual revenue of US$30 million. The chain has 19 restaurants and over 700 employees. Buddy's has been called one of the five best pizzerias in the United States by the Food Network.

== Food ==
The restaurant serves Detroit-style pizza baked in blue steel pans. In addition to pizza, Buddy's serves sandwiches, soups, pastas, salads, Sanders Hot Fudge Sundaes, and chicken tenders.

== History ==
Buddy's Rendezvous was opened in 1936 by Gus Guerra on Conant Street in Detroit as a speakeasy. It wasn't until 1946 when Buddy's Rendezvous created the Detroit-style pizza that it became a success. The recipe, a regional variation of Sicilian sfincione, was based on the family recipe of Guerra's wife, Anna, and refined by long-time employee Connie Piccinato.

The pizza's special crust was achieved by baking the dough in blue steel pans originally manufactured as automotive drip trays or small parts bins, which Guerra obtained from local factories.

In 1953, Guerra sold Buddy's Rendezvous and opened the Cloverleaf Bar in Eastpointe, Michigan (then East Detroit), where he continued to serve the square pizza. The original Buddy's location was eventually purchased by William "Billy" Jacobs circa 1972 because his wife, Shirlee Jacobs, liked the pizza. Their son, Robert Jacobs, took over the business and expanded it before selling to a private equity group Capital Spring in 2019.

The restaurant currently has 19 restaurants across Michigan.

In 2022, the restaurant chain opened two more locations, in Okemos and Clarkston.
