= Joe Girard =

American salesman (1928–2019)

- Born: Joseph Samuel Girardi; November 1, 1928; Detroit, Michigan
- Died: February 28, 2019 (aged 90); Detroit, Michigan

Joseph Samuel Girardi (November 1, 1928 – February 28, 2019), better known as Joe Girard, was an American salesman, motivational speaker, and author. Girard sold 13,001 cars at a Chevrolet dealership between 1963 and 1978, and was recognized by the Guinness Book of World Records as the seller of the most cars in a year (1,425 in 1973). (Note: The record was surpassed by Ali Reda of Les Stanford Chevrolet, with 1,582 cars sold in 2017.) Girard later became a successful motivational speaker, and gave regular presentations for corporate clients including General Motors, Hewlett-Packard, and Kmart. He resided in Grosse Pointe Shores, Michigan, until his death.

== Early life ==
Girard was the son of Antonino Girardi, an extremely poor man of Sicilian birth and his wife, Grace Stabile, a homemaker. Girard started working from an early age. A high school dropout, he started working as a shoeshine boy, then worked as a newsboy for the Detroit Free Press, dishwasher, delivery boy, stove assembler, and home building contractor.

== Career ==
The then 35-year-old Girard walked into a Detroit car dealership and begged a skeptical sales manager for a job as a salesman. He sold a car on his first day and, by the second month, he was so good that some of the other salesmen complained, and got him fired. His next job was at Merollis Chevrolet in Eastpointe, Michigan. There, he set consecutive sales records over a 15-year period. He then became an author and public speaker, using books and in-person presentations to share his sales techniques. He retired at the age of 49, with a record of 13,001 vehicles sold by him. He still holds the Guinness World Record for the largest number of cars sold.

As described in How to Sell Anything to Anybody, Girard decided early in his sales career to adopt the name "Girard" for business purposes as a way to avoid confrontations over his ethnicity or losing customers who might be prejudiced against Sicilians and Italians.

Girard appeared on What’s My Line? in 1974 and To Tell the Truth in 1973.

Girard died on February 28, 2019, from medical complications after a fall.

== Published works ==
- How To Sell Anything To Anybody
- How To Sell Yourself
- How To Close Every Sale
- Mastering Your Way To The Top
- Joe Girard's 13 Essential Rules of Selling

== Awards and honors ==
Girard's awards include The Golden Plate Award from the American Academy of Achievement, and he was nominated for the Horatio Alger Award by the late Dr. Norman Vincent Peale and the late Lowell Thomas.

In 2001, he was inducted into the Automotive Hall of Fame.

== See also ==
- List of Sicilian Americans
- Horatio Alger Association of Distinguished Americans
