= Jerry M. Linenger =

American astronaut (born 1955)

Jerry Linenger
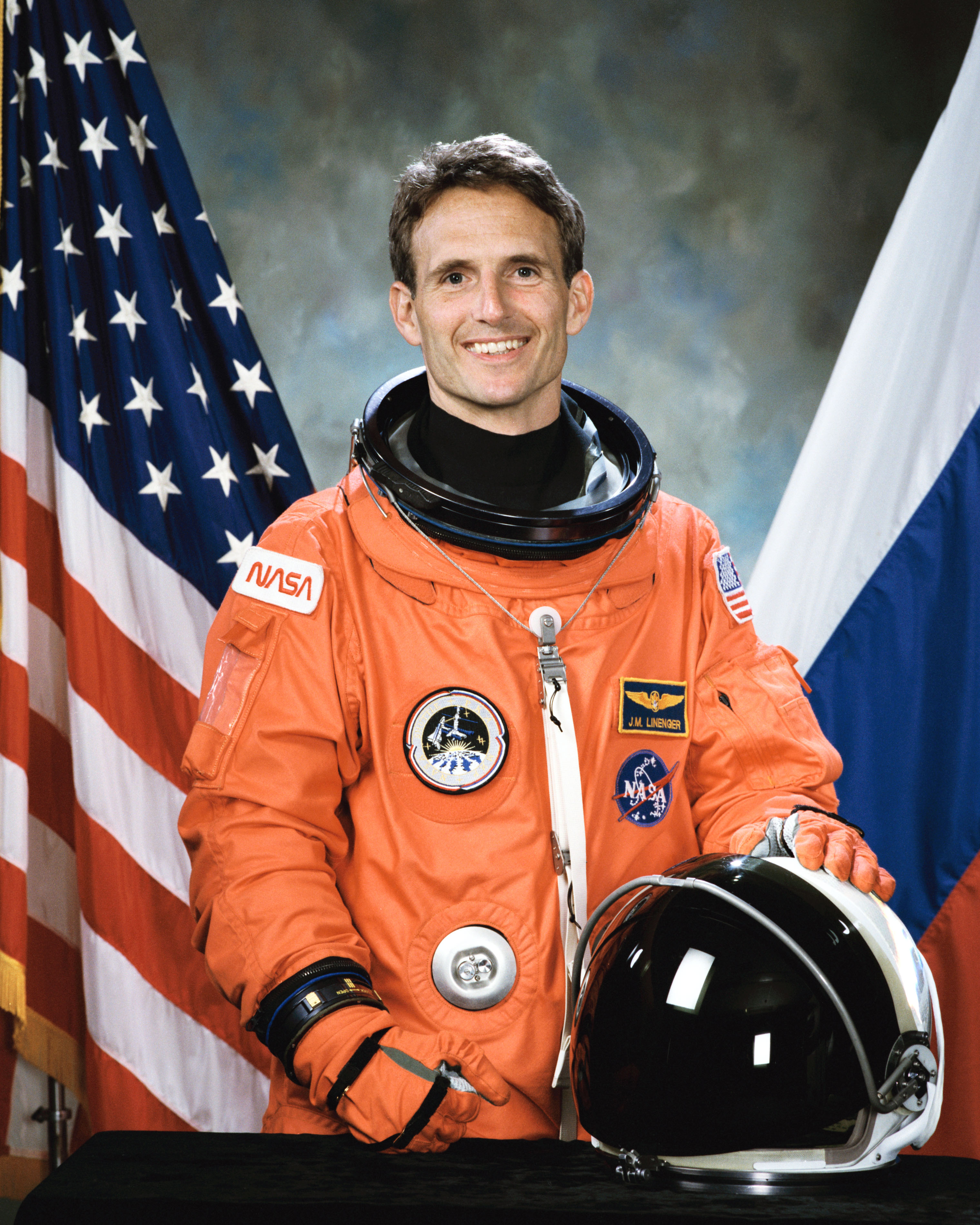
- Linenger in 1995
- Born: Jerry Michael Linenger; January 16, 1955 (age 71); Eastpointe, Michigan, U.S.
- Education: United States Naval Academy (BS); Wayne State University (MD); University of Southern California (MS); University of North Carolina, Chapel Hill (MPH, PhD)
- Space career

NASA astronaut
- Rank: Captain, USN
- Time in space: 143d 2h 50m
- Selection: NASA Group 14 (1992)
- Total EVAs: 1 (during Mir EO-23)
- Total EVA time: 4h, 59m
- Mission: STS-64; STS-81/84 (Mir EO-22/23)
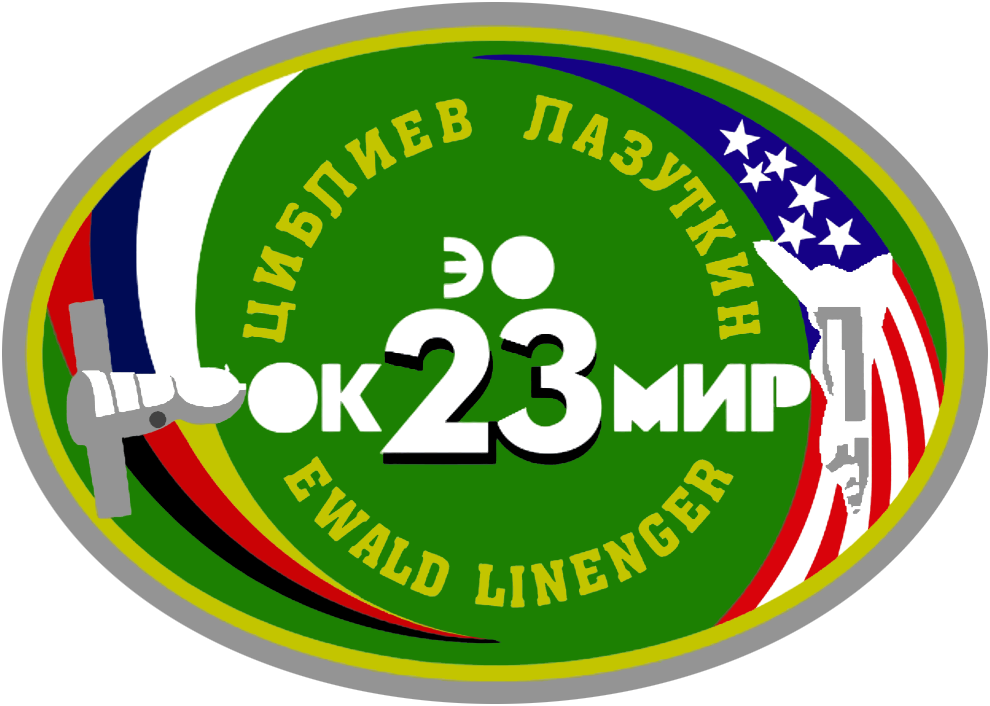
- Mission insignia

Jerry Michael Linenger (born January 16, 1955) is a retired Captain in the United States Navy Medical Corps, and a former NASA astronaut who flew on the Space Shuttle and Space Station Mir.

== Background ==
Born January 16, 1955, and raised in East Detroit, Michigan. Linenger graduated from East Detroit High School 1973. He received a Bachelor of Science degree in bioscience from the United States Naval Academy in 1977, a doctorate in medicine from Wayne State University School of Medicine in 1981, a Master of Science degree in systems management from the University of Southern California in 1988, a Master of Public Health degree in health policy from the University of North Carolina at Chapel Hill in 1989 and a Doctor of Philosophy degree in epidemiology from the University of North Carolina in 1989.

Linenger is a member of the Alumni Associations of the U.S. Naval Academy, University of Southern California, Wayne State University School of Medicine, and University of North Carolina, the Association of Naval Aviation, the U.S. Navy Flight Surgeons Association, the Aerospace Medicine Association, the American Medical Association, the American College of Preventive Medicine, the Society of U.S. Navy Preventive Medicine Officers, and the American College of Sports Medicine. He is board-certified in preventive medicine.

== Awards and honors ==
- Navy Commendation Medal with gold star
- NASA Space Flight Medals (2)
- Navy Unit Commendation
- Meritorious Unit Commendation
- Navy Battle Effectiveness Award
- National Defense Service Medal (2)
- Top graduate, Naval Flight Surgeon Training and Naval Safety Officer's School
- Elected to Phi Kappa Phi and Alpha Omega Alpha academic honor societies
- Distinguished Alumni Award, Wayne State University School of Medicine.
- Gold Medal, Royal Canadian Geographical Society
- There is a McDonald's in Eastpointe (formerly East Detroit) that was decorated in outer space/Jerry Linenger memorabilia. There was a statue of Linenger next to the cash register. The statue was tragically removed with a remodel in 2020. The sculpture was made by Alex Walker in 2000.

== Academic experience ==
Linenger graduated from the U.S. Naval Academy and proceeded directly to medical school. After completing his surgical internship training at Balboa Naval Hospital, San Diego, California, and aerospace medicine training at the Naval Aerospace Medical Institute, Pensacola, Florida, he served as a naval flight surgeon at Naval Air Station Cubi Point in the Philippines. He was then assigned as medical advisor to the Commander, Naval Air Forces, U.S. Pacific Fleet, San Diego. After completing doctorate-level training in epidemiology, Linenger returned to San Diego as a research principal investigator at the Naval Health Research Center. He concurrently served as a faculty member at the University of California, San Diego School of Medicine in the Division of Sports Medicine.

== NASA experience ==
Linenger joined astronaut selection Group 14 at the Johnson Space Center in August 1992. He flew on STS-64 (September 9–20, 1994) aboard the Space Shuttle Discovery. Mission highlights included: first use of lasers for environmental research, deployment and retrieval of a solar science satellite, robotic processing of semiconductors, use of an RMS-attached boom for jet thruster research, first untethered spacewalk in 10 years to test a self-rescue jetpack. In completing his first mission, Linenger logged 10 days, 22 hours, 51 minutes in space, completed 177 orbits, and traveled over 4.5 million miles.

Following his first mission, in January 1995, he began training at the Gagarin Cosmonaut Training Center in Star City, Russia, in preparation for a long-duration stay aboard the Russian Space Station Mir. All training was conducted using the Russian language, and consisted of learning all Mir space station systems (life support/electrical/ communication/attitude control/computer systems), simulator training, Soyuz launch/return vehicle operations, and spacewalk water tank training. He also trained as chief scientist to conduct the entire United States science program, consisting of over one-hundred planned experiments in various disciplines. A sampling includes: medicine (humoral immunity, sleep monitoring, radiation dosimetry), physiology (spatial orientation/performance changes during long duration flight), epidemiology (microbial surface sampling), metallurgy (determination of metal diffusion coefficients), oceanography/geology/limnology/physical science (photographic survey (over 10,000 photos) of the Earth), space science (flame propagation), microgravity science (behavior of fluids, critical angle determination).

Linenger launched aboard U.S. Space Shuttle Atlantis (STS-81) on January 12, 1997, remained on board the space station with two Russian cosmonauts upon undocking of the Shuttle, and eventually returned upon a different mission of Atlantis (STS-84) on May 24, 1997—spending a total of 132 days, 4 hours, 1 minute in space—the longest duration flight of an American male at that time.

During his stay aboard Space Station Mir, Linenger became the first American to conduct a spacewalk from a foreign space station and in a non-American made spacesuit. During the five-hour walk, he and his Russian colleague tested for the first time ever the newly designed Orlan-M Russian-built spacesuit, installed the Optical Properties Monitor (OPM) and Benton dosimeter on the outer surface of the station, and retrieved for analysis on Earth numerous externally mounted material-exposure panels.

The three crewmembers also performed a "flyaround" in the Soyuz spacecraft-undocking from one docking port of the station, manually flying to and redocking the capsule at a different location-thus making Linenger the first American to undock from a space station aboard two different spacecraft (U.S. Space Shuttle and Russian Soyuz).

While living aboard the space station, Linenger and his two Russian crewmembers faced numerous difficulties: the most severe fire ever aboard an orbiting spacecraft, failures of onboard systems (oxygen generator, carbon dioxide scrubbing, cooling line loop leaks, communication antenna tracking ability, urine collection and processing facility), a near collision with a resupply cargo ship during a manual docking system test, loss of station electrical power, and loss of attitude control resulting in a slow, uncontrolled "tumble" through space. In spite of these challenges and added demands on their time (in order to carry out the repair work), they still accomplished all mission goals-spacewalk, flyaround, and one-hundred percent of the planned U.S. science experiments.

In completing the nearly five-month mission, Linenger logged approximately 50 million miles (the equivalent of over 110 round trips to the Moon and back), more than 2,000 orbits around the Earth, and traveled at an average speed of 18,000 miles per hour.

Linenger retired from NASA and the U.S. Navy in January 1998.

== Bibliography ==
- Off The Planet: Surviving Five Perilous Months Aboard The Space Station MIR - by Jerry M. Linenger - 1999 - ISBN 0-07-136112-X
- Letters from MIR: An Astronaut's Letters to His Son - by Jerry M. Linenger - 2002 - ISBN 0-07-140009-5

== See also ==
- Leaving Earth: Space Stations, Rival Superpowers, and the Quest for Interplanetary Travel by Robert Zimmerman - 2003 - ISBN 0-309-08548-9 (more sympathetic to Linenger, and critical of the Russian Federal Space Agency and NASA.)
