= Eastpointe, Michigan =

- City
- Motto(s): "Gateway to Macomb County" "A Family Town"
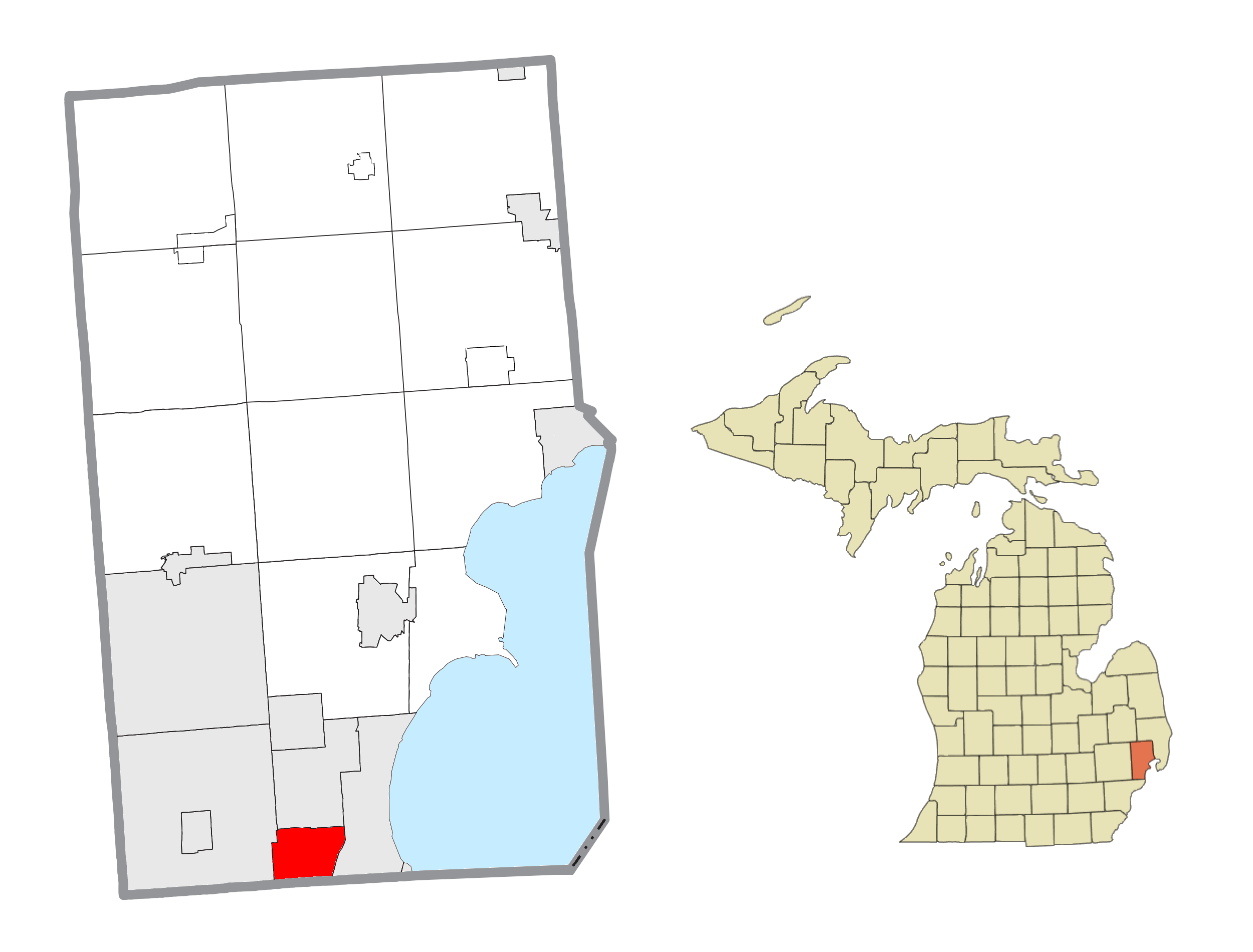
- Location within Macomb County
- Coordinates: 42°27′58″N 82°56′47″W
- Country: United States
- State: Michigan
- County: Macomb
- Founded: 1837
- Incorporated (village): December 8, 1924 as Halfway
- Incorporated (city): January 7, 1929 as East Detroit
- Renamed: July 1, 1992 as Eastpointe

Government
  - Type: Council–manager
  - Mayor: Michael Klinefelt
  - Mayor Pro Tem: Cardi DeMonaco Jr.
  - City council: Harvey Curley; Rob Baker; Margaret Podsiadlik
  - Manager: Mariah Walton (acting, 2021–22; permanent, 2022–present)

Area
  - Total: 5.160 sq mi (13.364 km^{2})
  - Land: 5.158 sq mi (13.358 km^{2})
  - Water: 0.0019 sq mi (0.005 km^{2})
- Elevation: 614 ft (187 m)

Population (2020)
  - Total: 34,318
  - Estimate (2023): 33,676
  - Density: 6,529.5/sq mi (2,521.04/km^{2})
- Time zone: UTC−5 (Eastern (EST))
  - Summer (DST): UTC−4 (EDT)
- ZIP Code: 48021
- Area code: 586
- FIPS code: 26-24290
- GNIS feature ID: 1623024
- Sales tax: 6.0%
- Website: eastpointemi.gov

Eastpointe (formerly East Detroit) is a city in Macomb County in the U.S. state of Michigan. An inner-ring suburb of Detroit, Eastpointe borders Detroit to the south, roughly 11 miles (17.7 km) northeast of Downtown Detroit. As of the 2020 census, the city had a population of 34,318.

== History ==
The community was first settled by Irish and German immigrants in the 1830s. In October 1897, a post office was established there with the name of "Half-way", as it was near the halfway point of the stage run between downtown Detroit and the Macomb County seat at Mount Clemens. It incorporated as the village of Halfway in December 1924 and reincorporated as the city of East Detroit in January 1929. Prior to 1924, most of the community formed a part of Erin Township (which includes all or part of Eastpointe, Roseville, and St. Clair Shores. The city changed its name to "Eastpointe" after the change was approved by residents in a 1992 referendum; the name change had been proposed to remove any perceived association with the adjacent city of Detroit; the "pointe" suffix is intended to associate the city instead with the nearby affluent communities of the Grosse Pointes. The city also changed its name to give the community a sense that it was its own city with its own unique history, identity, and not an extension or branch of Detroit. Other names were also nominated for the referendum never balloted.

The city's school district was unaffected by the municipal name change, and was called East Detroit Public Schools until 2017, when it changed the district name to Eastpointe Community Schools to align with the community name. It has one high school (Eastpointe High School), one middle school (Eastpointe Middle School, formerly Kelly Middle School), and four elementary schools. The primary district boundaries of Eastpointe Community Schools encompass the City of Eastpointe, minus the northeastern portion (east of Kelly Rd. and north of Stephens) and the southeastern portion of the city of Warren.

== Geography ==
Eastpointe is in southern Macomb County, 10 miles (16 km) northeast of Downtown Detroit and 7 miles (11 km) north of Grosse Pointe. It is bordered to the west by the city of Warren, to the north by Roseville, and to the east by St. Clair Shores. It is bordered to the south by the cities of Detroit and Harper Woods in Wayne County. Roads that follow the city borders include Beechwood Avenue (up until it reaches Stephens Road, where it switches over to Hayes) on its western border (properties on both sides of these streets are within the city limits), 8 Mile/M-102 on its southern border, Beaconsfield/the southern and western bound section of the I-94 service drive on its eastern border, and 10 Mile Road on its northern border except for portions of the blocks of Macomb St. west to Hayes.

According to the United States Census Bureau, the city has a total area of 5.16 square miles (13.36 km^{2}), of which 0.002 square miles (0.005 km^{2}), or 0.04%, are water.

Eastpointe is generally considered to be a bedroom community. It is a relatively short drive from many other points of interest in the Detroit area. It is served by Interstate 94 (I-94) and I-696, as well as M-3 (Gratiot Avenue), M-102 (8 Mile Road), and 9 Mile Road.

== Demographics ==
Historical population
Census	Pop.	Note	%±
1930	5,955		—
1940	8,584		44.1%
1950	21,461		150.0%
1960	45,756		113.2%
1970	45,920		0.4%
1980	38,280		−16.6%
1990	35,283		−7.8%
2000	34,077		−3.4%
2010	32,442		−4.8%
2020	34,318		5.8%
2023 (est.)	33,676		−1.9%
U.S. Decennial Census; 2020 Census

=== 2020 census ===
As of the 2020 census, Eastpointe had a population of 34,318, with 13,126 households and 8,523 families. The population density was 6,653.4 inhabitants per square mile (2,568.9/km^{2}), and there were 13,798 housing units.

The median age was 37.1 years. 23.8% of residents were under the age of 18 and 12.7% of residents were 65 years of age or older. For every 100 females there were 92.0 males, and for every 100 females age 18 and over there were 87.4 males age 18 and over.

100.0% of residents lived in urban areas, while 0.0% lived in rural areas.

Households with children under the age of 18 made up 33.4% of all households. Married-couple households were 30.9%, 21.8% were households with a male householder and no spouse or partner present, and 38.0% were households with a female householder and no spouse or partner present. About 28.7% of all households were made up of individuals and 10.3% had someone living alone who was 65 years of age or older.

The homeowner vacancy rate was 2.1% and the rental vacancy rate was 5.0%. Of all housing units, 4.9% were vacant.

Racial composition as of the 2020 census
Race	Number	Percent
White	13,512	39.4%
Black or African American	18,086	52.7%
American Indian and Alaska Native	92	0.3%
Asian	367	1.1%
Native Hawaiian and Other Pacific Islander	11	0.0%
Some other race	352	1.0%
Two or more races	1,898	5.5%
Hispanic or Latino (of any race)	818	2.4%

=== 2010 census ===
As of the 2010 census, there were 32,442 people, 12,557 households, and 8,220 families residing in the city. The population density was 6,307.4 inhabitants per square mile (2,435.3/km^{2}). There were 13,796 housing units at an average density of 2,684.0 per square mile (1,036.3/km^{2}). The racial makeup of the city was 65.6% White, 29.5% African American, 0.4% Native American, 1.1% Asian, 0.5% from other races, and 2.9% from two or more races. Hispanic or Latino residents of any race were 2.1% of the population.

There were 12,557 households, of which 34.9% had children under the age of 18 living with them, 39.9% were married couples living together, 19.5% had a female householder with no husband present, 6.0% had a male householder with no wife present, and 34.5% were non-families. 28.7% of all households were made up of individuals, and 10.7% had someone living alone who was 65 years of age or older. The average household size was 2.58 and the average family size was 3.19.

The median age in the city was 36.3 years. 25.7% of residents were under the age of 18; 8.8% were between the ages of 18 and 24; 28.6% were from 25 to 44; 25.7% were from 45 to 64; and 11.3% were 65 years of age or older. The gender makeup of the city was 48.4% male and 51.6% female.

=== 2000 census ===
As of the 2000 census, there were 34,077 people, 13,595 households, and 8,959 families residing in the city. The population density was 6,678.8 inhabitants per square mile (2,578.7/km^{2}). There were 13,965 housing units at an average density of 2,737.0 per square mile (1,056.8/km^{2}). The racial makeup of the city was 92.13% White, 4.70% African American, 0.42% Native American, 0.87% Asian, 0.01% Pacific Islander, 0.27% from other races, and 1.61% from two or more races. Hispanic or Latino residents of any race were 1.33% of the population.

There were 13,595 households, out of which 30.2% had children under the age of 18 living with them, 48.6% were married couples living together, 12.3% had a female householder with no husband present, and 34.1% were non-families. 28.8% of all households were made up of individuals, and 13.8% had someone living alone who was 65 years of age or older. The average household size was 2.50 and the average family size was 3.11.

In the city, 24.5% of the population was under the age of 18, 7.6% was from 18 to 24, 32.3% from 25 to 44, 19.2% from 45 to 64, and 16.5% was 65 years of age or older. The median age was 37 years. For every 100 females, there were 94.3 males. For every 100 females age 18 and over, there were 90.9 males.

The median income for a household in the city was $46,261, and the median income for a family was $54,895. Males had a median income of $41,449 versus $28,095 for females. The per capita income for the city was $20,665. About 4.2% of families and 6.4% of the population were below the poverty line, including 8.5% of those under age 18 and 7.8% of those age 65 or over.

== Economy ==
The American Power Boat Association (APBA) is a New York non-profit, membership owned corporation that was created in 1903 by an act of the New York legislature as a racing association for powerboats. The APBA is headquartered in Eastpointe.

At one time Spirit Airlines had its headquarters in Eastpointe. The headquarters moved to Miramar, Florida in the Miami Metropolitan Area in November 1999.

In 1959, a young businessman by the name of Art Van Elslander opened the doors to a 4,000-square-foot (370 m^{2}) Danish furniture showroom on Gratiot Avenue in Eastpointe which would become the first Art Van.

== Culture and arts ==
Cruisin' Gratiot in June is an annual weekend celebration of automotive history, tradition and memorabilia. The event includes car shows, contests, and live music.

The Michigan Military Technical & Historical Society Museum is in Eastpointe.

Eastpointe has many summer festivals and events, including Erin-Halfway Days Living History Festival held at John F. Kennedy Memorial Park in late July, Music in the Park Wednesday nights at Spindler Park, and Summer Fest, formerly known as The Ox Roast, mid to late August at John F. Kennedy Memorial Park.

== Government ==
Eastpointe is a Michigan home-rule city and operates under the council-manager form of government. The city's mayor and four council members are elected at large to four-year staggered terms.

In 2017, Eastpointe elected its first African-American councilwoman, Monique Owens. In 2019, Suzanne Pixley, who had been mayor since 2007, did not seek reelection after her third four-year term. Councilwoman Monique Owens succeeded Pixley as mayor in 2019, becoming the first African-American mayor of Eastpointe.

Owens was unseated in the 2023 mayoral primary. Her tenure as mayor was marred by multiple scandals, including a lawsuit alleging that she violated residents' First Amendment rights and a criminal charge for alleged false statements on a grant application. Residents also objected to police reports she made against critics, her failure to file financial disclosure statements, her heated tirades against residents and other officials during meetings, and her lack of support for the LGBT community.

On November 7, 2023, voters chose former city council member Michael "Mike" Klinefelt as mayor, with Klinefelt becoming the first openly-LGBT mayor of the city. Eastpointe voters also elected incumbent Harvey Curley and newcomer Margaret Podsiadlik to the city council. The three were sworn in the following Monday.

=== Discrimination lawsuit ===
After a racial discrimination lawsuit was brought against the city regarding its election of all city council members through Plurality-at-large voting, alleging that the plurality-at-large system discriminated against African-American voters and violated Section 2 of the Voting Rights Act, the city settled the lawsuit with the United States Department of Justice in June 2019 by agreeing to switch to single transferable vote for the at-large election of city council members for the November 2019 municipal election.

Beginning with the November 2019 election, ranked choice voting was used on the city council ballot, making Eastpointe the first municipality in Michigan to adopt ranked choice voting.

=== First Amendment lawsuit ===
In 2022, four Eastpointe residents filed a federal lawsuit against the City of Eastpointe and Mayor Monique Owens alleging violations of their First Amendment rights. The plaintiffs alleged that Owens had interrupted and censored their remarks during time allotted for public comments at council meetings and engaged in viewpoint discrimination against them. The complaint requested that the city amend its public comment rules and sought damages from the mayor.

On December 8, 2022, a federal judge issued a preliminary injunction prohibiting Owens from shouting down speakers or restricting the subject matter of their remarks. The order is to remain in effect until the case is resolved or the court orders otherwise.

The lawsuit stemmed largely from an incident at the council's September 6, 2022, meeting, during which Owens interrupted or talked over three residents who had attempted to speak. As Owens argued with one of the residents, the other four council members walked out, ending the meeting.

The plaintiffs are represented by attorneys from the Foundation for Individual Rights and Expression (FIRE), a First Amendment advocacy group.

=== LGBT community relations ===
In 2019, the City of Eastpointe became one of the first municipalities in Macomb County to recognize Pride Month, despite the opposition of Mayor Monique Owens, who said that Eastpointe has "always accepted everybody". On May 16, 2023, the Eastpointe City Council again voted on a Pride Month resolution, but it failed in a 2-2 vote due to opposition from Rob Baker and Stacy Cobb-Muñiz. Owens was absent from the meeting. The council's decision prompted sparked a protest at City Hall.

=== Mayor's criminal conviction ===
On September 28, 2023, Eastpointe's departing mayor, Monique Owens, pleaded no contest to a misdemeanor charge of making a false statement. The case, which was initially charged as felony false pretenses, stemmed from her application for a CARES Act grant for her business. The application stated that her business, Naturally Funny Talent Agency, was 51 percent of more owned by veterans and that it had 100-249 employees. Upon investigation, the Macomb County Sheriff's Office determined that Owens had never served in the military and that she was the sole employee of the company. On November 9, 2023, Owens was sentenced to six months of probation, 100 hours of community service, and $725 in court costs.

== Education ==
Eastpointe Community Schools operates public schools in Eastpointe and includes most of the municipality. The southeastern corner of the city is instead within South Lake Schools. Koepsell Elementary of the South Lake district is in Eastpointe.

Eaton Academy, a charter school, is in Eastpointe. It is located on the grounds of the former St. Veronica School of the Roman Catholic Archdiocese of Detroit.

St. Thomas Lutheran Church formerly operated the St. Thomas Lutheran School. A drop in enrollment occurred after the Great Recession in the late aughts. It closed in 2015. The Great Start Readiness Program began renting the facility after its closure.

=== Higher education ===
Eastpointe is also served by Macomb Community College's South Campus, which is located in Warren, two miles north of the city.

Wayne County Community College District's Mary Ellen Stempfle University Center is located in Harper Woods, just across 8 Mile from Eastpointe.

== State and federal government facilities ==
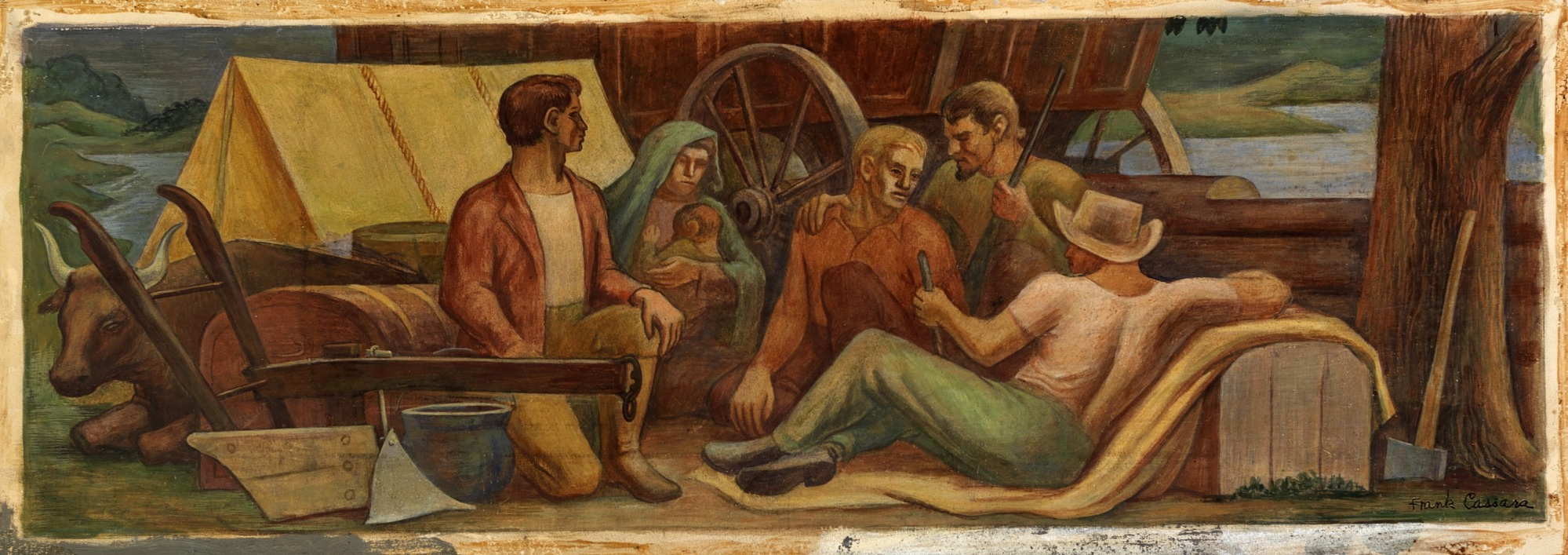
Study for Early Settlers (1940), Frank Cassara's mural at the post office in Eastpointe

The U.S. Postal Service operates the East Detroit Post Office in Eastpointe.

The Michigan Secretary of State has a branch office in Eastpointe.

== Notable people ==
Raised in Eastpointe, Douglas A. Brook (b. 1944) was United States Assistant Secretary of the Army (Financial Management and Comptroller) from 1990 to 1992 and Assistant Secretary of the Navy (Financial Management and Comptroller) from 2007 to 2009.

Eric Bischoff (b. 1955) former president of World Championship Wrestling (1993–1999) and on-screen personality for WWE (2002–2006). Currently the co-host of 83 Weeks podcast (2019–present)

Merollis Chevrolet of Eastpointe is where Guinness Book of World Records "World's Greatest Salesman" Joe Girard set consecutive sales records over a fifteen-year period.

Jerry M. Linenger, M.D., M.S.S.M., M.P.H., Ph.D. (Captain, Medical Corps, USN, Ret.) is a former NASA astronaut, who flew on the Space Shuttle and Space Station Mir Born and raised in Eastpointe, Linenger graduated from East Detroit High School in 1973.

Detroit-style pizza inventors, Gus and Anna Guerra opened Cloverleaf Bar (on Gratiot Avenue in 1953 after selling Buddy's Pizza (originally named Buddy's Rendezvous) on Six Mile Rd and Contant Street in Detroit.

Alice Cooper (aka Vincent D. Furnier; b. 1948, Detroit), an American shock-rock singer and musician, was a childhood resident of East Detroit. He resided on Lincoln Ave. near Kelly Road, and attended grade school at Kantner Elementary.

Actor Jayson Blair of MTV's The Hard Times of RJ Berger is an Eastpointe native.

Christian Berishaj (stage name JMSN) is an American singer, songwriter, multi-instrumentalist, producer, engineer, mixer, videographer and designer and a former member of the band, Love Arcade, in which he was known as Snowhite. He was raised in Eastpointe.

Adrenalin is an American rock band from East Detroit Michigan, that is perhaps best known for their song "Road of the Gypsy," featured in the 1986 film Iron Eagle.

Jeopardy! Tournament of Champions contestant Sandie Baker was from Eastpointe.

=== Athletics ===
East Detroit High School produced a number of professional football players, including Gary Ballman, Ron Kramer, and Mickey Walker.

Dennis Brown is a former American football player and coach. In 1995, Brown was hired as the head football coach at East Detroit High School.

== Religion ==
=== Catholic churches ===
Roman Catholic churches in Eastpointe include St. Basil the Great Church and St. Veronica Parish.

The St. John Deaf Center, affiliated with Holy Innocents Church in Roseville, is in Eastpointe.

St. Barnabas Catholic Church closed permanently in 2021.

Our Lady of Grace Vietnamese Parish (Vietnamese: Gx Đức Mẹ Ban Ơn Lành) is in nearby Warren. Our Lady of Grace was previously in Eastpointe, but moved to Warren in 2012 when it merged with St. Cletus Church. Our Lady of Grace had an increasing parishioner base and was asking for a larger facility, so it was combined with another church with a declining number of parishioners.

== See also ==
- List of municipalities in Michigan

== Sources ==
- Eastpointe History, City website retrieved January 20, 2006
- Romig, Walter. Michigan Place Names. Detroit: Wayne State University Press, 1986.
