= Ron Kramer =

American football player (1935–2010)

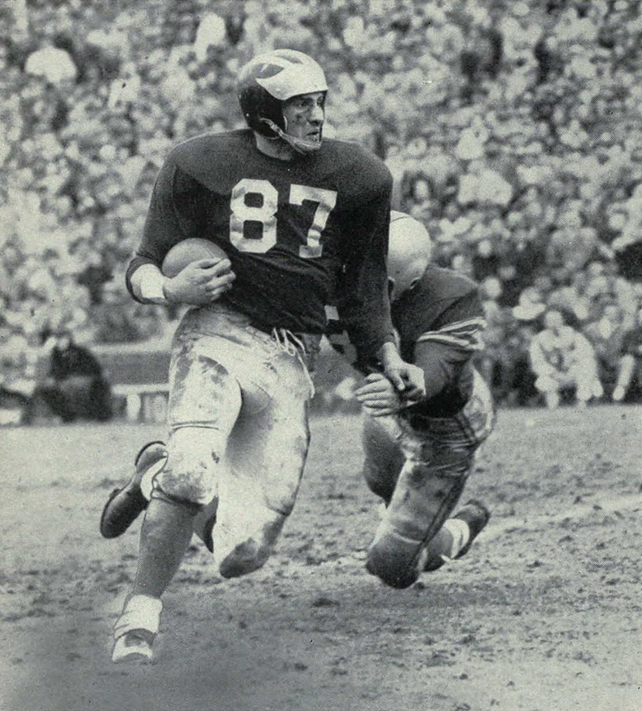
- Kramer in 1955

No. 88, 83
- Positions: Tight End, End

Personal information
- Born: June 24, 1935; Girard, Kansas, U.S.
- Died: September 11, 2010 (aged 75); Fenton, Michigan, U.S.
- Listed height: 6 ft 3 in (1.91 m)
- Listed weight: 234 lb (106 kg)

Career information
- High school: East Detroit (East Detroit, Michigan)
- College: Michigan (1954–1956)
- NFL draft: 1957: 1st round, 4th overall pick

Career history
- Green Bay Packers (1957, 1959–1964); Detroit Lions (1965–1967)

Awards and highlights
- 2× NFL champion (1961, 1962); First-team All-Pro (1962); Second-team All-Pro (1963); Pro Bowl (1962); NFL 50th Anniversary All-Time Team; Green Bay Packers Hall of Fame; Unanimous All-American (1956); Consensus All-American (1955); Second-team All-American (1954); 3× First-team All-Big Ten (1954–1956); NFF Distinguished American Award (1982); Michigan Wolverines No. 87 retired

Career NFL statistics
- Receptions: 229
- Receiving yards: 3,272
- Receiving touchdowns: 16
- Stats at Pro Football Reference
- College Football Hall of Fame

Ronald John Kramer (June 24, 1935 – September 11, 2010) was an American professional football player who was an end in the National Football League (NFL), primarily for the Green Bay Packers. A member of two NFL champion teams with the Packers, he was named to the NFL 50th Anniversary All-Time Team and Green Bay Packers Hall of Fame.

Kramer attended the University of Michigan from 1953 to 1957, winning a total of nine varsity letters in football, basketball, and track. Playing at left end for the Michigan Wolverines football team from 1954 to 1956, he was selected as a consensus first-team All-American in 1955 and a unanimous All-American in 1956. His jersey No. 87 was retired after Kramer's senior year, and he was inducted into both the College Football Hall of Fame and the University of Michigan Athletic Hall of Honor in 1978.

Kramer was selected by Green Bay with the fourth pick in the 1957 NFL draft and played for the Packers for seven seasons (1957, 1959–1964). He was a key player on coach Vince Lombardi's first NFL championship teams in 1961 and 1962. Kramer was selected as a first-team All-NFL player in 1962 after catching 37 passes for 555 yards and seven touchdowns. He also played three seasons for the Detroit Lions from 1965 to 1967.

== Early life ==
Born in Girard, Kansas, Kramer moved to East Detroit, Michigan (now Eastpointe) at age five. He attended East Detroit High School where he was an all-state player in football, basketball and track in high school. He competed in the shot put and long jump in track. In December 1952, Kramer was named as an end on the United Press All-Michigan football team.

== University of Michigan ==
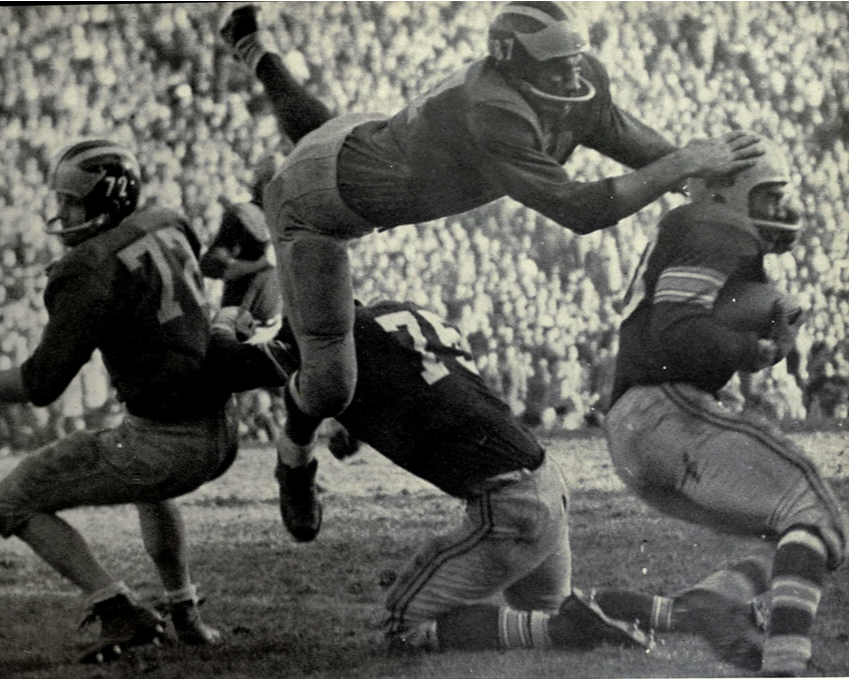
Kramer tackling Ohio State's Jim Roseboro, 1956

Kramer enrolled at the University of Michigan in 1953. He was a three-sport athlete (football, basketball, and track) and led both the football and basketball teams in scoring for two years. Altogether, Kramer won a total of nine varsity letters in his three sports — the maximum number possible, as freshmen did not have athletic eligibility at the time.

=== Football ===
Kramer played college football at the end position (both defensive and offensive) for the Michigan Woverines from 1954 through 1956.

As a 19-year-old sophomore, Kramer started all nine games at left end for the 1954 team that finished the season ranked #15 in the final AP Poll. He was the leading receiver for the Wolverines with 23 catches for 303 yards and two touchdowns. At the end of the 1954 season, he was selected as a first-team All-Big Ten player.

As a junior in 1955, Kramer started six games at left end and Michigan finished 12th in the final AP Poll. Kramer set a Michigan record with three touchdown passes in a game against Missouri in 1955. For the season as a whole, he caught 12 passes for 224 yards and four touchdowns, and he was selected as a consensus first-team end on the 1955 College Football All-America Team.

Kramer had his best collegiate season as a senior, starting all nine games in 1956 and the Wolverines ended at seventh in the final AP Poll. Kramer caught 18 passes for 353 yards and two touchdowns in 1956. At the end of the season, Kramer was a consensus first-team All-American.

Following Kramer's senior year, Michigan retired his jersey number 87 – one of only five numbers in school history to be retired. In three years at Michigan, Kramer caught 53 passes for 880 yards and eight touchdowns. He was also known as an outstanding tackler and blocker. Bennie Oosterbaan, Kramer's football coach at Michigan, described his blocking and tackling ability as his most valuable asset. Oosterbaan said this of his star player:

"To top off his marvelous physical gifts of size and speed and strength, plus an uncanny coordination, Kramer was one of the fiercest competitors I've ever seen. Nothing was impossible for him — the impossible was only a challenge."

Kramer also handled kicking and punting duties for Michigan. He handled 31 punts for a 40.6 yard average, kicked two field goals, and successfully converted 43 of 51 extra point attempts.

=== Basketball ===
Kramer also excelled in basketball. He played at the center position and was selected as the basketball team's most valuable player as a junior. As basketball team captain, he was third-team All-Big Ten in 1957 after being second-team All-Big Ten in both 1955 and 1956. During his junior year, he averaged 20.4 points per game over a 22-game season and is a member of the career 1,000-point club. He held the Michigan career scoring record of 1,119 points from 1957 until it was broken by John Tidwell in 1961. He was a fifth round pick in the 1957 NBA draft (34th overall), selected by the Detroit Pistons.

Kramer was a two-sport professional athlete. He played in the Midwest Professional Basketball League for two seasons. Kramer played for the Battle Creek Warriors in 1961–1962, alongside former Michigan teammates M.C. Burton and John Tidwell. He and Burton then played for the Toledo Tartans in 1962–1963.

== NFL career ==
=== Green Bay Packers ===
Kramer was the fourth overall selection in the 1957 NFL draft, picked by the Green Bay Packers. Kramer also received an offer in February 1957 to play with the all-star basketball team that toured with the Harlem Globetrotters; he rejected the offer to play professional basketball. As a rookie for the Packers in 1957, Kramer appeared in 11 games and caught 28 passes for 337 yards. He missed the entire 1958 season due to service in the U.S. Air Force, and the Packers had the worst record in the league at 1–10–1.

Kramer returned to the Packers in 1959, but caught no passes that year and only four passes during the 1960 season. Teammate Paul Hornung later described Kramer's evolution after Vince Lombardi arrived in 1959:

"[O]ne real special case was Ron Kramer. He came to us, Ron did, with an I-don't-give-a-damn attitude. He had great ability and great confidence in it but he just didn't use it. For a long time, he wasn't able to do the job. Vince got on (him) something terrible. He never let up and then one day, after nearly two years of that I guess, things just went click, click, click and Ron Kramer became a magnificent football player."

Kramer reached his stride after moving to the tight end position during the 1961 season; that year, Kramer had 35 catches for 559 yards and four touchdowns. In 1962, Kramer caught 37 passes for 555 yards and seven touchdowns and was selected to play in the Pro Bowl and as a first-team All-Pro player. From 1961 to 1964, Kramer had at least 500 receiving yards every season, averaging 16 yards per reception. He became an integral part of Vince Lombardi's 1961 and 1962 teams that won the Packers' first NFL championships since 1944. In the 1961 NFL Championship Game, a 37–0 win for the Packer over the New York Giants, Kramer was the leading receiver, catching four passes for 80 yards and two touchdowns. In addition to his talent as a receiver, Kramer's talent as a blocker was an integral part of the famed "Packers Sweep."

=== Detroit Lions ===
Kramer played out his contract option with the Packers and, as a free agent, signed a one-year contract with the Detroit Lions in August 1965. The Lions were required to compensate the Packers with a first-round draft choice in 1966. Kramer had asked to be traded to the Lions so he could be closer to his wife and children. Teammate Jerry Kramer recalled, "He asked Coach Lombardi to trade him because he was trying to save his marriage."

Kramer played three seasons for the Lions at the tight end position from 1965 to 1967. He appeared in 39 games for the Lions, 13 as a starter. In his first two seasons with the Lions, Kramer caught 55 passes for 638 yards and a touchdown. During the 1967 season, Kramer was slowed by injuries and caught only four passes for 40 yards in 11 games.

In July 1968, the Lions gave Kramer his unconditional release. Three weeks later, Kramer announced that, despite receiving offers to play for several other teams, he was resigning from football to assume a position as vice president of Paragon Steel Corp. in Detroit. Kramer later described his years with the Lions as "awful" and called head coach Harry Gilmer "the dumbest guy I ever met."

== NFL career statistics ==
Legend
| | Won the NFL championship |
| | Led the league |
| **Bold** | Career high |

=== Regular season ===
| Year | Team | Games | | Receiving | | | | |
| Year | Team | GP | GS | Rec | Yds | Avg | Lng | TD |
|---|---|---|---|---|---|---|---|---|
| 1957 | GNB | 11 | 9 | 28 | 337 | 12.0 | 31 | 0 |
| 1959 | GNB | 12 | 0 | 0 | 0 | 0.0 | 0 | 0 |
| 1960 | GNB | 12 | 4 | 4 | 55 | 13.8 | 18 | 0 |
| 1961 | GNB | 14 | 14 | 35 | **559** | 16.0 | 53 | 4 |
| 1962 | GNB | 14 | 14 | **37** | 555 | 15.0 | 54 | **7** |
| 1963 | GNB | 12 | 12 | 32 | 537 | **16.8** | 49 | 4 |
| 1964 | GNB | 14 | 14 | 34 | 551 | 16.2 | 55 | 0 |
| 1965 | DET | 14 | 8 | 18 | 206 | 11.4 | 23 | 1 |
| 1966 | DET | 14 | 14 | **37** | 432 | 11.7 | **68** | 0 |
| 1967 | DET | 11 | 10 | 4 | 40 | 10.0 | 16 | 0 |
| Career | | 128 | 99 | 229 | 3,272 | 14.3 | 68 | 16 |

=== Playoffs ===
| Year | Team | Games | | Receiving | | | | |
| Year | Team | GP | GS | Rec | Yds | Avg | Lng | TD |
|---|---|---|---|---|---|---|---|---|
| 1960 | GNB | 1 | 0 | 0 | 0 | 0.0 | 0 | 0 |
| 1961 | GNB | 1 | 1 | **4** | **80** | **20.0** | **37** | **2** |
| 1962 | GNB | 1 | 1 | 2 | 25 | 12.5 | 17 | 0 |
| Career | | 3 | 2 | 6 | 105 | 17.5 | 37 | 2 |

== Honors and later years ==
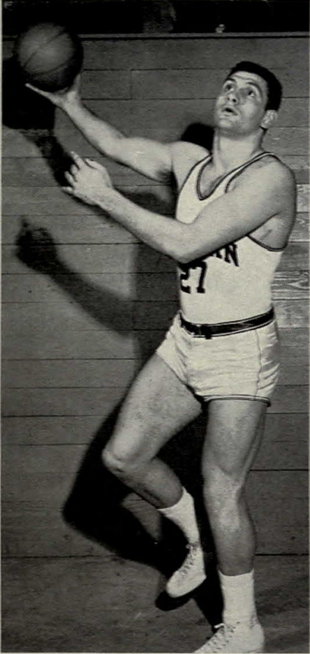
Kramer in basketball uniform, 1957

After retiring as a football player, Kramer went into the steel business. In 1969, he was hired as a vice president of Paragon Steel Corp. of Detroit. He spent 22 years at Paragon before establishing Ron Kramer Industries in 1981, a company which is still in business today. He had two children, Kurtis Kramer and Cassandra Koehler.

Kramer received numerous honors and awards, including the following:

- In 1971, Kramer was inducted into the Michigan Sports Hall of Fame.
- In 1975, Kramer was inducted into the Green Bay Packers Hall of Fame.
- In 1978, Kramer was inducted into the College Football Hall of Fame .
- Also in 1978, Kramer became one of the first seven individuals inducted into the University of Michigan Athletic Hall of Honor.
- In 1981, Kramer was named as a recipient of the NCAA's Silver Anniversary Award in recognition of significant professional and civic contributions spanning 25 years after completion of his college eligibility.
- In 1999, Sports Illustrated published a list of "The 50 Greatest Sports Figures From Michigan" (in all sports), and ranked Kramer seventh on the list behind such noted athletes as Joe Louis, Magic Johnson, Charlie Gehringer and Bennie Oosterbaan.

Kramer died in September 2010 at age 75.

On September 15, 2012, Kramer was recognized as a Michigan Football Legend and his jersey (#87) was unretired and given to Brandon Moore. Each player honored with the No. 87 jersey will wear a patch over the left upper chest honoring Kramer, and dress at a locker labeled with a plaque bearing his name and time of tenure at Michigan.

In 2019, despite not being in the Pro Football Hall of Fame, he was chosen as a finalist for the NFL's 100th Anniversary Team.

== See also ==
- List of Michigan Wolverines football All-Americans
- University of Michigan Athletic Hall of Honor
