= Eastpointe Community Schools =

School district in Michigan, United States

Address
- 24685 Kelly Road Eastpointe, Macomb, Michigan, 48021; United States

District information
- Grades: Pre-Kindergarten-12
- Superintendent: Christina A. Gibson
- Schools: 8
- Budget: $48,719,000 2022-2023 expenditures
- NCES District ID: 2612450

Students and staff
- Students: 2,178 (2024-2025)
- Teachers: 127.37 (on an FTE basis) (2024-2025)
- Staff: 394.82 FTE (2024-2025)
- Student–teacher ratio: 17.1 (2024-2025)

Other information
- Website: www.eastpointeschools.org

Eastpointe Community Schools (formerly East Detroit Public Schools) is a school district headquartered in Eastpointe, Michigan, United States in Metro Detroit. The district serves most of Eastpointe and a portion of Warren.

== History ==
The municipality's name had changed to Eastpointe from East Detroit in 1991, but at the time the school district's name remained the same. According to a 2017 press release, the school district had retained its original name "as a nod to the rich history of the community".

In a four-year period until 2012 the district lost 1,400 students. In 2012 it had $4.2 million fewer dollars in operating revenue than it did in 2011. In 2012 the district had 3,500 students. During that year the district opened up a school of choice program for grades K-8 so that anyone from Macomb County may apply to attend East Detroit schools.

On November 8, 2013, David Zauner, a teacher at East Detroit High School, dove into a pool to rescue a 14-year-old student who was drowning. The boy died in the hospital four days later. In June 2014 Zauner accused the school district and John Rizzo, the school's assistant principal and athletic director, of retaliating against him for cooperating with a police investigation about the incident; Zauner is suing the district and Rizzo.

On July 1, 2017, the East Detroit Public Schools changed its name to Eastpointe Community Schools to align with the name of the municipality. Along with the change in district name, the high school, middle school, and Kellwood Alternative Center were also changed to align with the new district name. In addition, the Eastpointe Community Schools have added an Early Learning Center to promote early childhood education.

== Schools ==
=== Secondary schools ===
- Eastpointe Alternative Center
- Eastpointe High School
- Eastpointe Middle School

=== Elementary schools ===
==== Elementary schools (K-2) ====
- Crescentwood Elementary School
- Forest Park Elementary School

==== Elementary schools (3-5) ====
- Bellview Elementary School
- Pleasantview Elementary School

=== Early Learning ===
- Eastpointe Early Learning Center

=== Former Schools ===
- Grant Junior High School
- Oakwood Middle School
- Kantner Elementary School
- Roosevelt Elementary School
- Warrendale Elementary School
- Woodland Elementary School
- Kellwood Elementary School
- Kern Elementary School
- Deerfield Elementary School
- Roxana Park Elementary School
