= Ham and eggs (disambiguation) =

Ham and eggs is a popular breakfast dish.

Ham and eggs may also refer to:

- Ham and Eggs, a 1933 Oswald the Lucky Rabbit cartoon
- "Ham and Eggs" (or "Ham an' Eggs"), a folk/blues song recorded by Lead Belly, Lonnie Donegan, and others
- "Ham and Eggs", a 2000 single by Zen Guerrilla
- Ham and Eggs at the Front, a 1927 silent comedy film
- Ham and egg bun, a type of Hong Kong pastry
- Ham and Eggs Movement, an old-age pension initiative in 1930s California

== See also ==
- Green Eggs and Ham, a children's book by Dr. Seuss
- A variation of the dish Eggs Benedict in which ham is substituted for traditional bacon
