= Croque monsieur =

French hot sandwich with ham and cheese

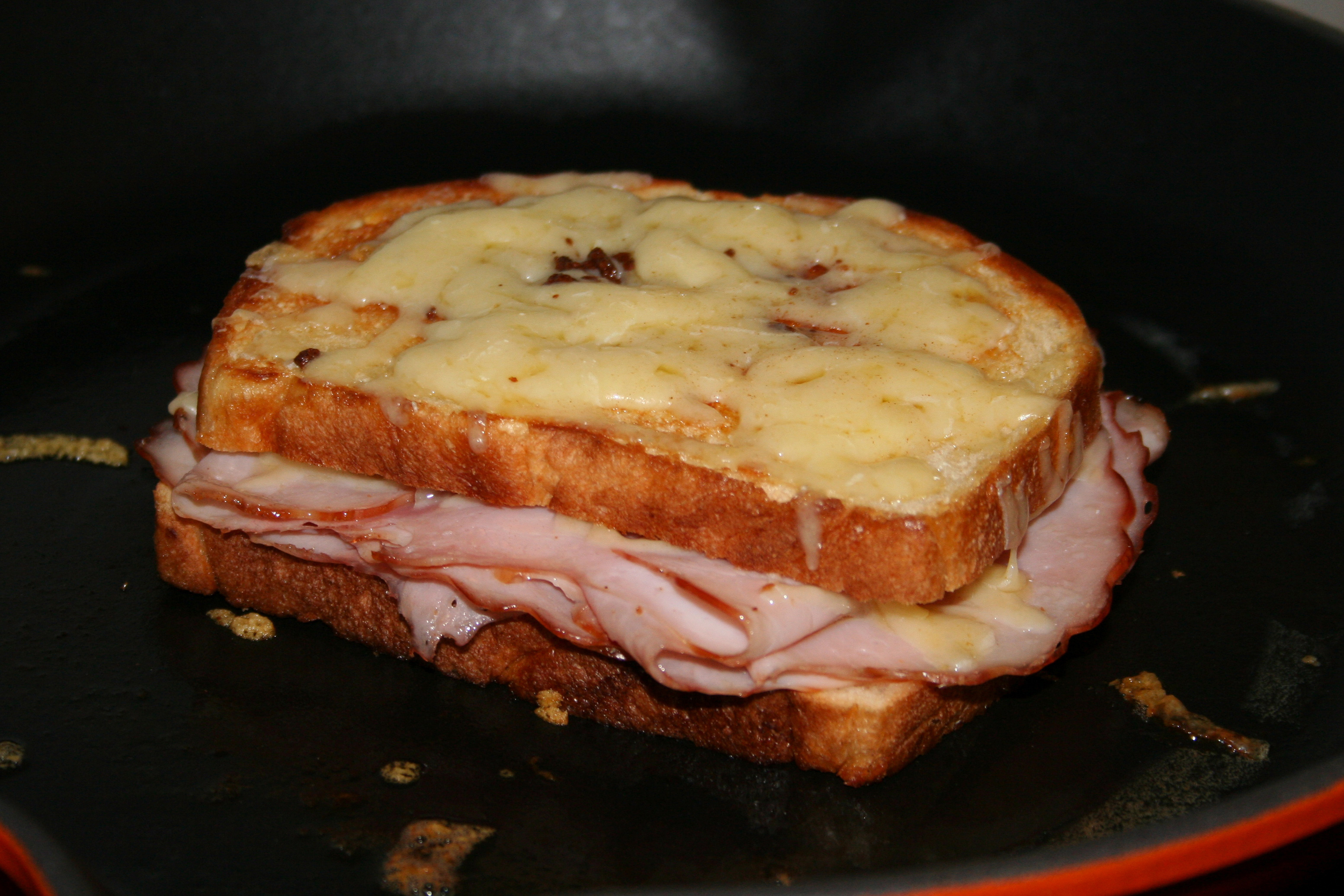
- A croque monsieur
- Type: Sandwich
- Place of origin: France
- Serving temperature: Hot
- Main ingredients: Bread, butter, ham (typically boiled), cheese (typically Gruyère), pepper and salt
- Variations: Croque madame

A croque monsieur (French pronunciation: [kʁɔk məsjø], croque = "crunch", monsieur = "mister, gentleman") is a hot sandwich made with ham and cheese.

== History ==
There are references to the dish before the end of the 19th century. In 1891, La Revue Athlétique mentions them:

It is late and we are very hungry. What should we do for lunch? Ham becomes monotonous in the long run. The Diplomat, who is a bit of a gourmand, and in this he resembles Talleyrand, has an idea. "Let's make croque-monsieurs". Quickly, the toast, the butter, the Gruyère cheese, the ham, a little cayenne pepper and we are at work. One cuts, another butters, the third puts it all together into sandwiches that Vincent fries in the pan.
They are exquisite, the croque-monsieurs, a little big perhaps, made for the jaws of giants, but who cares? We eat them, we come back to them, we are delighted.

== Preparation ==
A croque monsieur is traditionally made with baked or boiled ham and sliced cheese between slices of pain de mie, topped with grated cheese and lightly salted and peppered, and then baked in an oven or fried in a frying pan. The bread may optionally be browned by grilling after being dipped in beaten egg. Traditionally Gruyère is used, but sometimes Comté or Emmental cheese as well. Some brasseries also add béchamel sauce.

Croque monsieur may be baked or fried so that the cheese topping melts and forms a crust.

== Variations ==
A croque monsieur served with a poached or lightly fried egg on top is known as a croque madame (or, in parts of Normandy, as a croque-à-cheval). Jacques Pépin maintains that a croque madame is made with chicken in place of ham. According to the Petit Robert dictionary, the name dates to around 1960. The name croque-mademoiselle is associated with its lighter, vegetarian version: made of the same bread, but with ordinary melting cheese, accompanied with chives, cucumber and lettuce.

In the United States, the Monte Cristo (a ham-and-cheese sandwich often dipped in egg and fried) is popular fare in diners.

Variants of the sandwich with substitutions or additional ingredients are given names modeled on the original croque-monsieur, for example:

Name	Added ingredients	Ref.
Barros Jarpa	Variation with same ingredients from Chilean cuisine	
Barros Luco	Made with roast beef instead of ham	
Croque provençal	Tomato	
Croque auvergnat	Bleu d'Auvergne cheese	
Croque chevre	Topped with a large slice of goat cheese.	
Croque norvégien	Smoked salmon instead of ham	
Croque tartiflette	Sliced potatoes and Reblochon cheese	
Croque bolognese / Croque Boum-Boum	Bolognese sauce	
Croque señor	Tomato salsa	
Croque Hawaiian	Slice of pineapple	
Croque gagnet	Gouda cheese and andouille	
Croque Madame	Fried egg or chicken	
Croque monsieur with bechamel	Standard croque monsieur topped with bechamel sauce	
Francesinha	Variation from Portuguese cuisine with steak, sausage, ham, melted cheese and a beer sauce	
Monte Cristo	French sandwich with varying other additions, incl. but not limited to powdered sugar and fried in either egg or batter.	

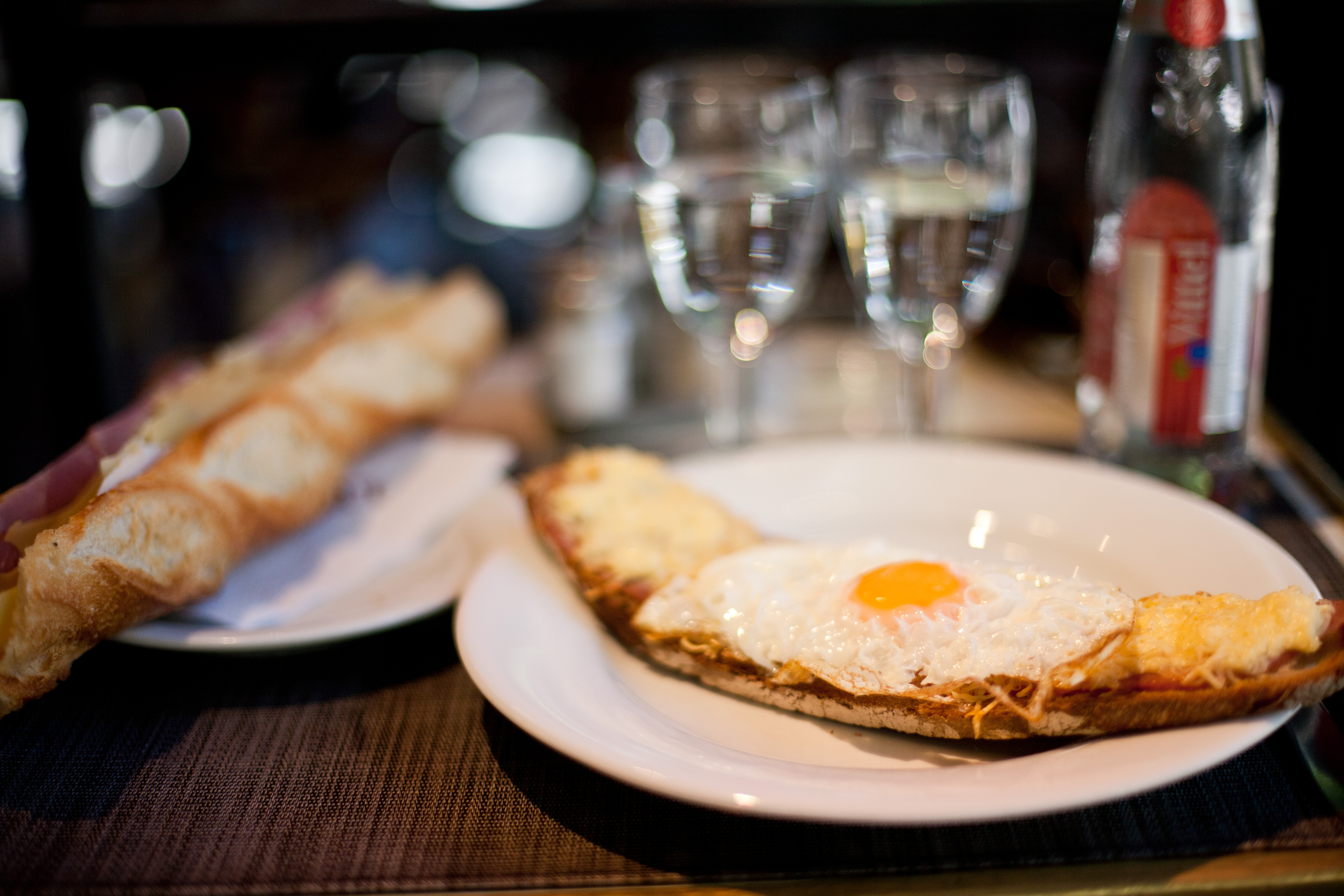
A croque madame

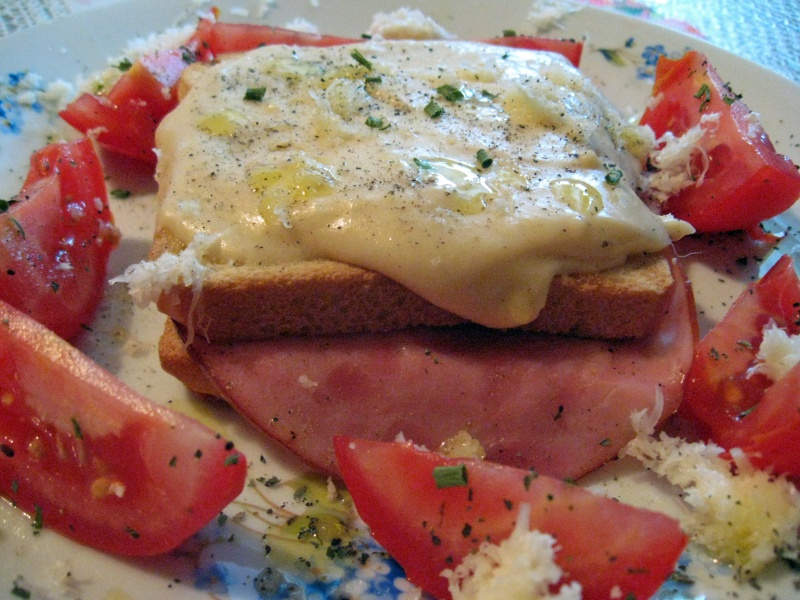
A croque provençal

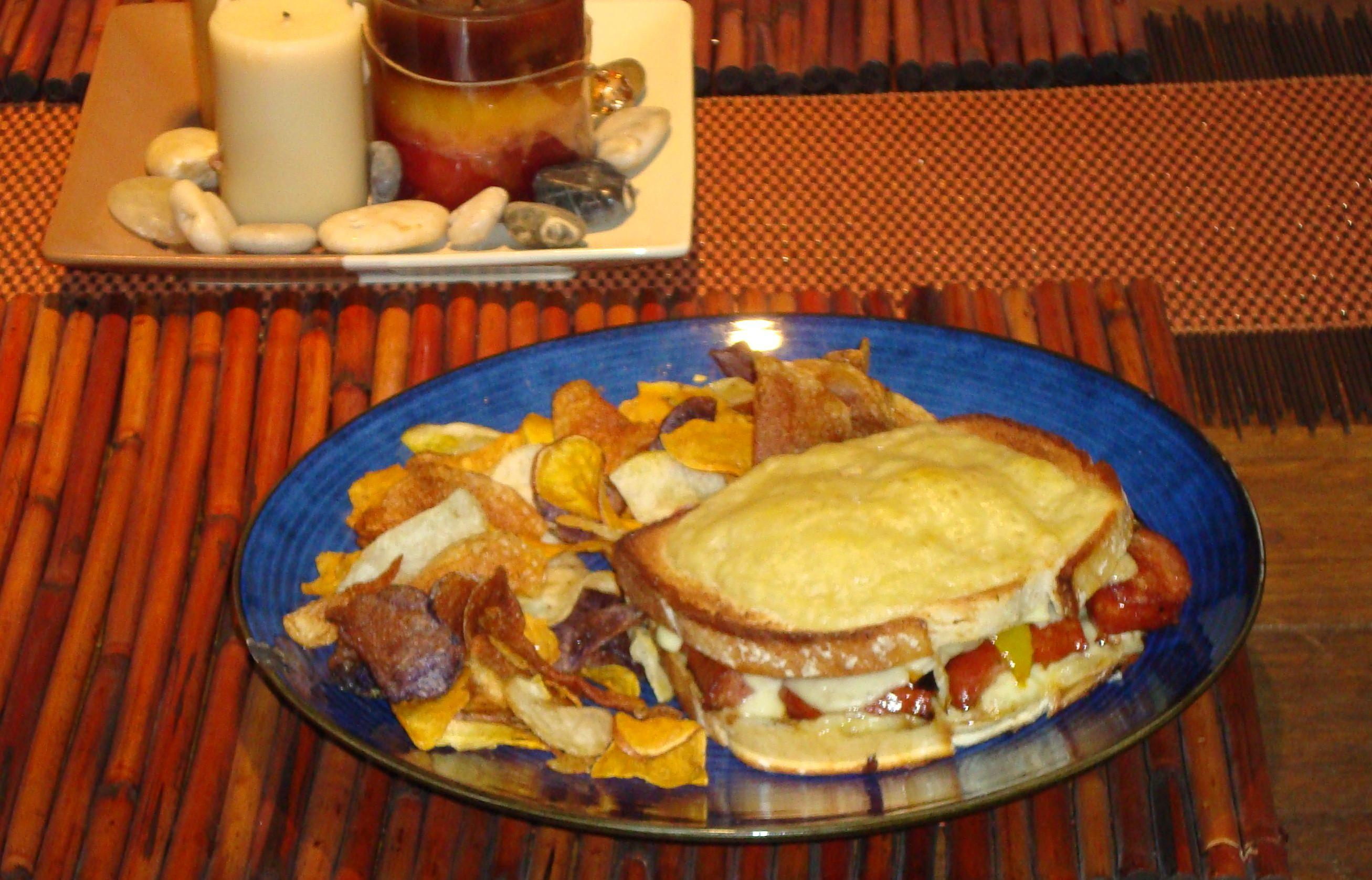
A croque gagnet

Portuguese version from Porto, called "Francesinha"

== See also ==
- Welsh rarebit
- Ham and cheese sandwich
- Ham and egg bun
- Monte Cristo sandwich
- Francesinha
- Strammer Max
- Toastie
- List of ham dishes
- List of sandwiches
