= Parisien (disambiguation) =

Parisien is a name for residents of Paris.

Parisien may also refer to:

- Paris Basin (Bassin parisien), a major geological region of France
- Jambon-beurre, a French ham sandwich also known as a parisien
- François Parisien (born 1982), Canadian former professional cyclist
