= Ham and eggs =

Anglo-American staple dish

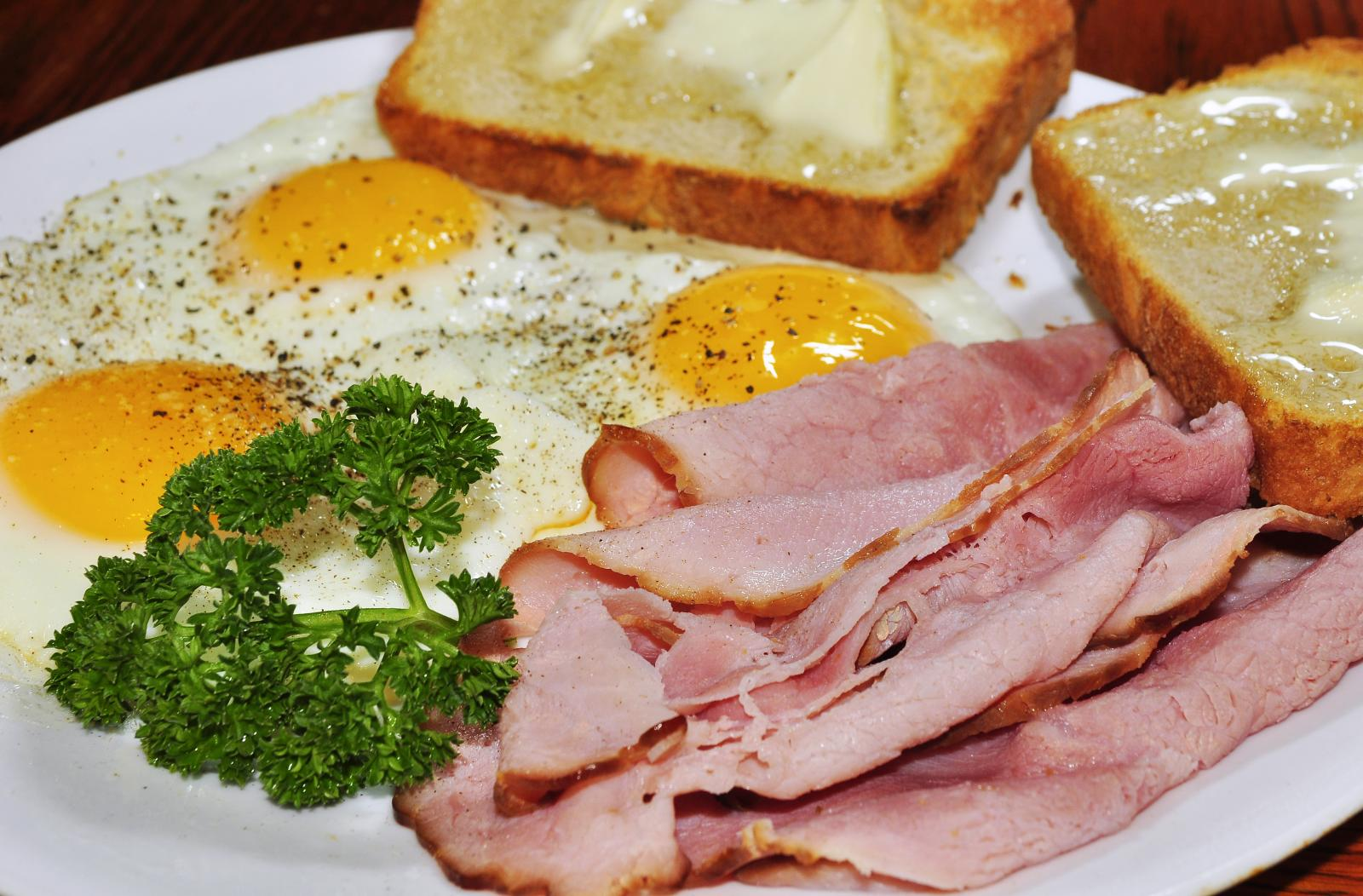
- Ham and eggs served with thinly sliced ham and fried eggs prepared "sunny side up", served with toast
- Course: Breakfast
- Serving temperature: Hot
- Main ingredients: Eggs, ham
- Similar dishes: Bacon and eggs, Spanish eggs, Denver omelette, Eggs Benedict

Ham and eggs is a dish consisting of ham served with eggs, usually as a hot breakfast dish. It has been described as a staple of "an old-fashioned American breakfast". It is also served as a lunch and dinner dish. The eggs may be fried, scrambled, or poached, while the ham may be served as slices, a ham steak, or country ham. Similar dishes include bacon and eggs, Spanish eggs, the Denver omelette and eggs Benedict.

The term "ham and eggs" and some variations of it have been used in various cultural contexts. In the United States, it has been used as a slang term, and to refer to various entities and events.

== Preparation ==
Ham and eggs is a popular dish often served as a breakfast meal in the United States. It is also consumed as a dinner or supper dish, for example in parts of the Southern United States, and is sometimes served as a lunch dish. Eggs served with the dish can be fried, scrambled or poached. Additional ingredients such as tomatoes and seasonings, such as herbes de Provence, are sometimes used. The dish can be prepared on a stovetop in a skillet or frying pan, and also baked or broiled in an oven.

The pan juices or gravy from the ham can be drizzled over the eggs to enhance flavor. Using high-quality ham and cooking over low heat helps prevent overcooking and improves the dish. One variation, country-style ham and eggs, involves reducing cream in the pan after cooking and then dolloping it over the top. Ham and eggs are often accompanied by side dishes such as toast and hash browns.

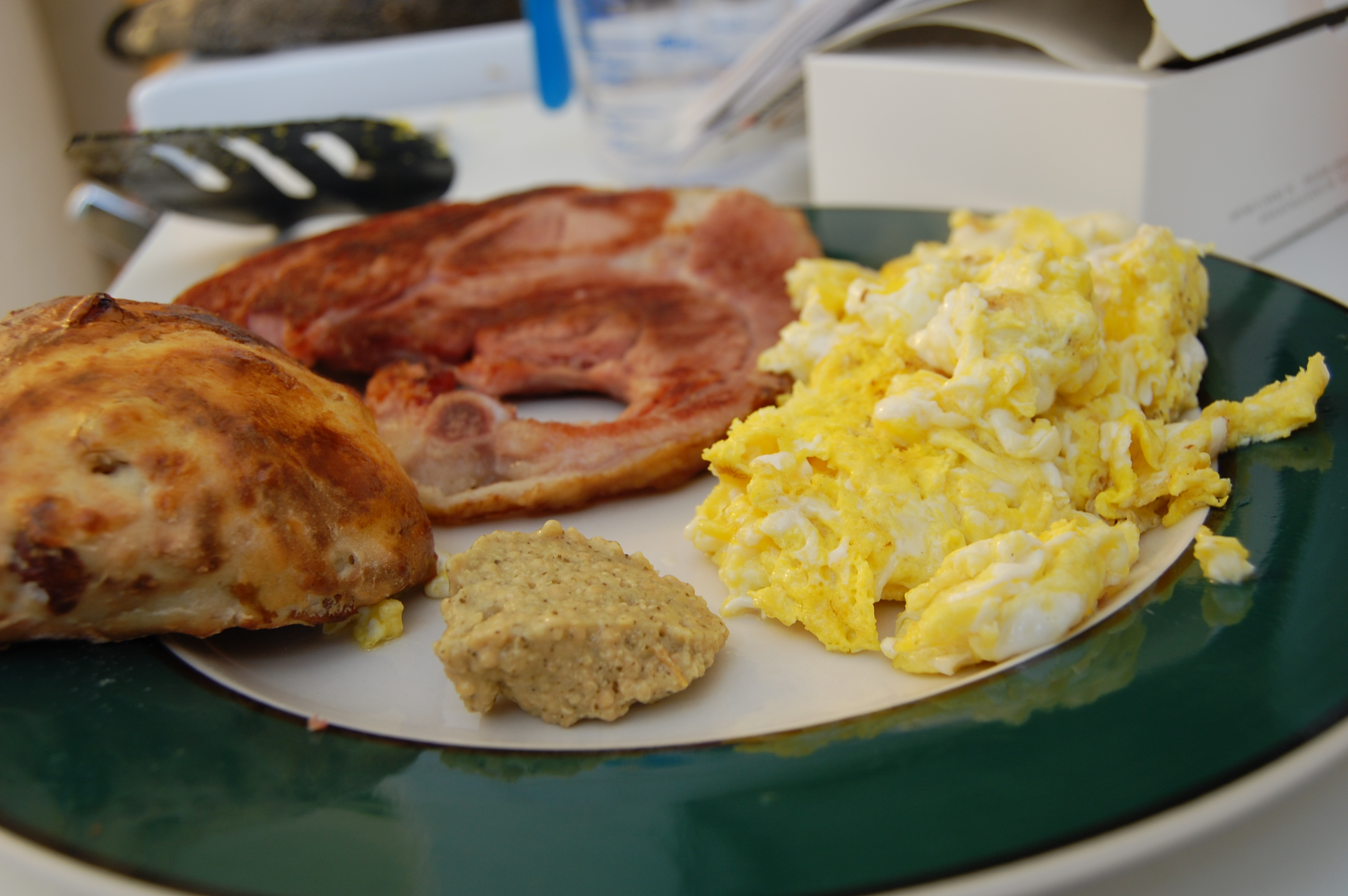
Ham and eggs served with scrambled eggs

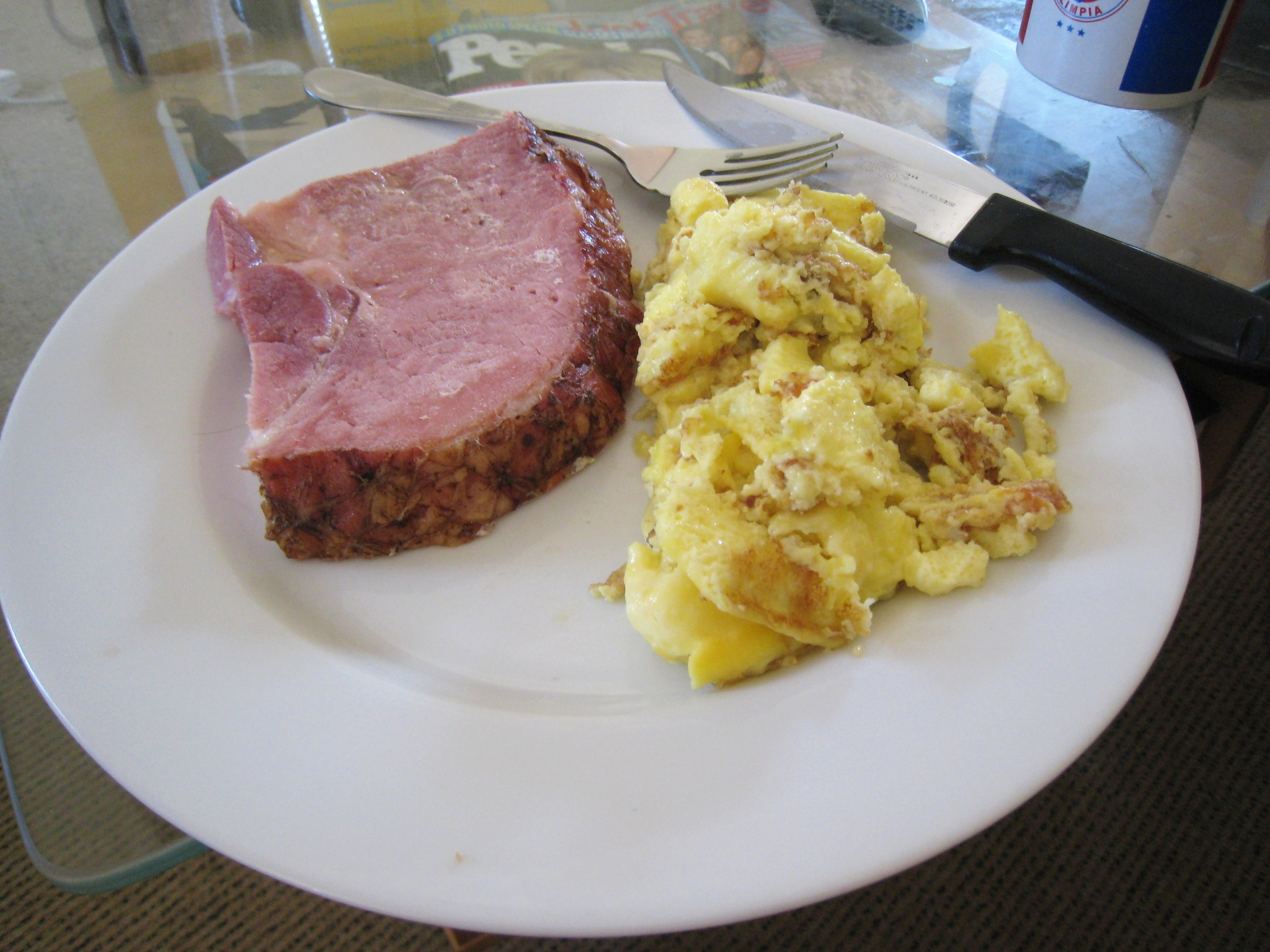
A thick-cut ham steak and scrambled eggs

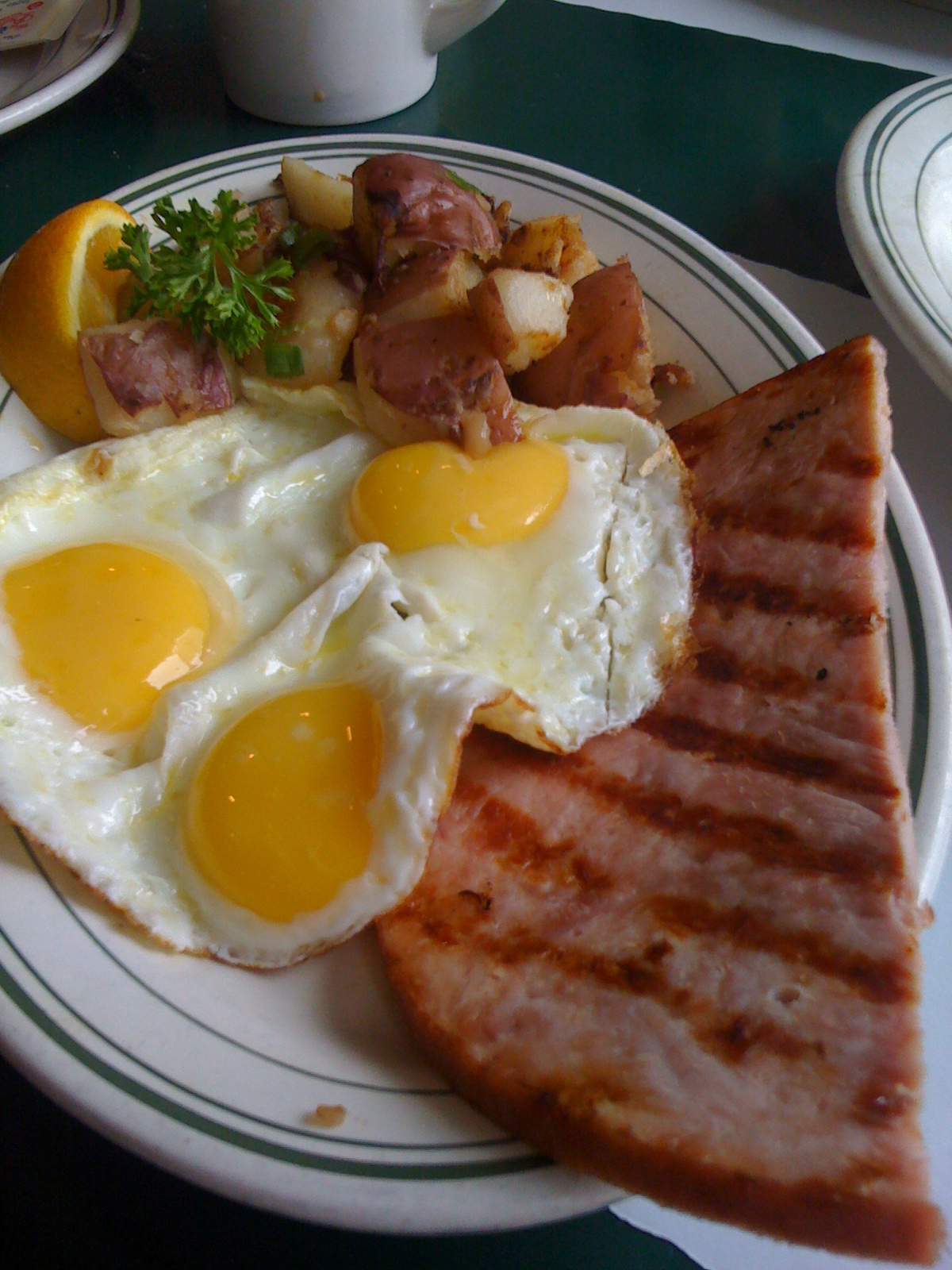
Grilled ham and fried eggs

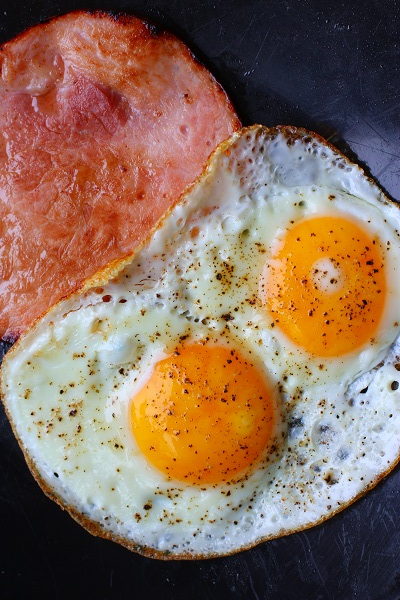
A close-up view of fried ham and eggs

== Similar dishes ==
Bacon and eggs is a similar dish, as is Eggs Benedict, which is prepared using bacon, Canadian bacon or ham and poached eggs as main ingredients. Spanish eggs consists of ham and eggs served atop heavily seasoned boiled rice. Ham and eggs are two of the main ingredients in the Denver omelette.

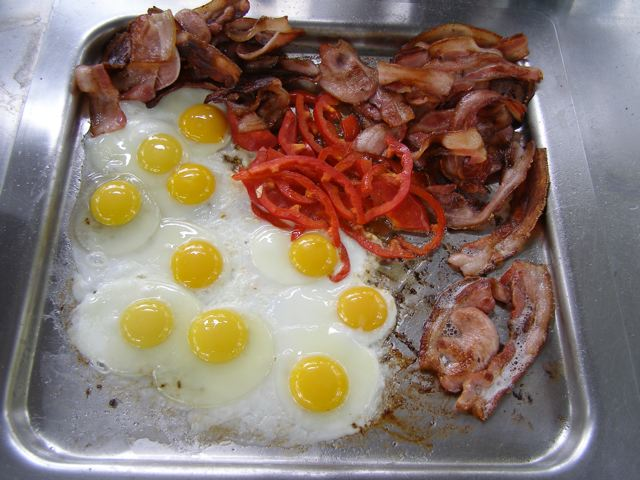
Bacon and eggs

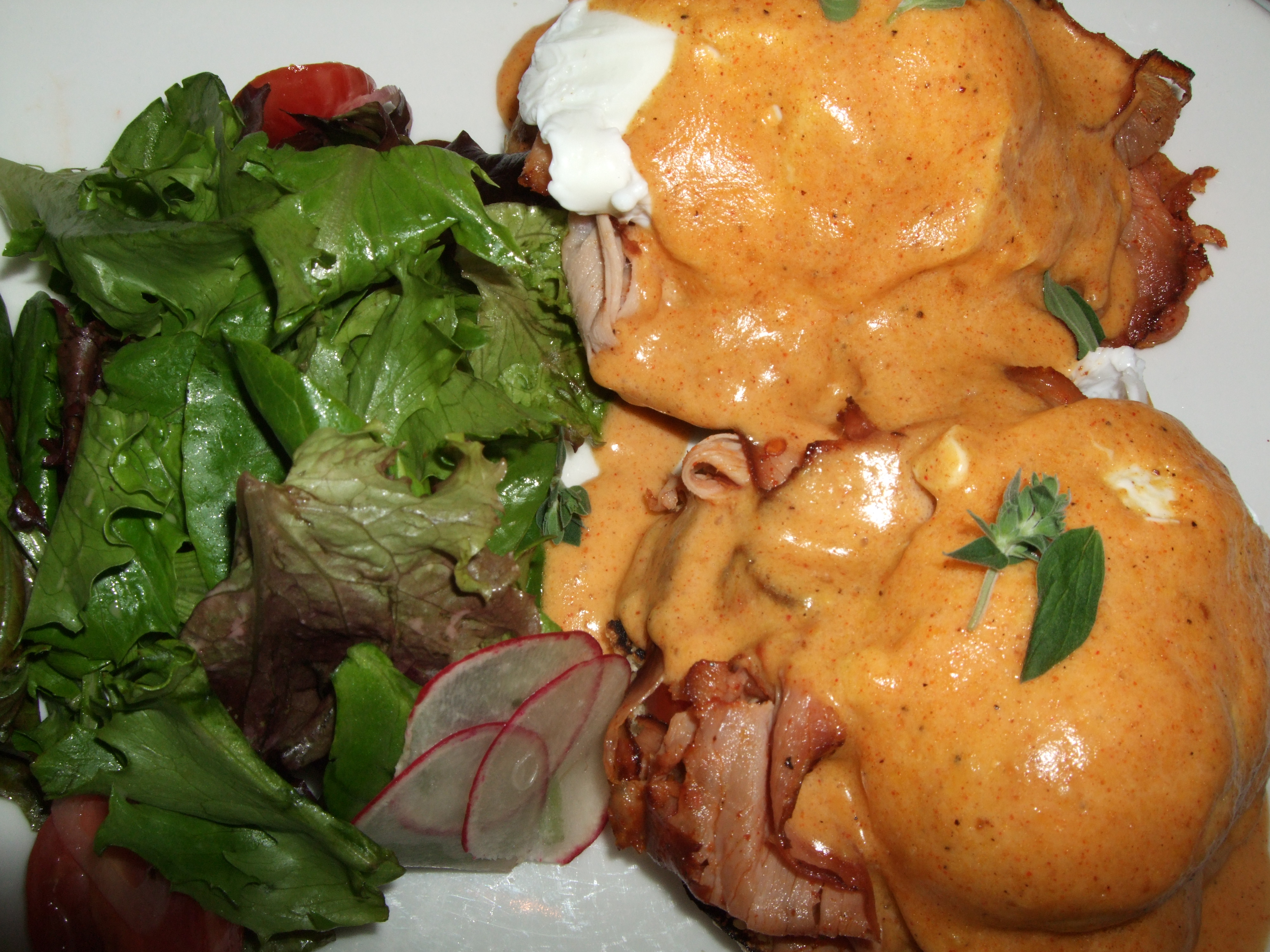
Eggs Benedict prepared with tasso ham, tomato and cajun-style hollandaise sauce

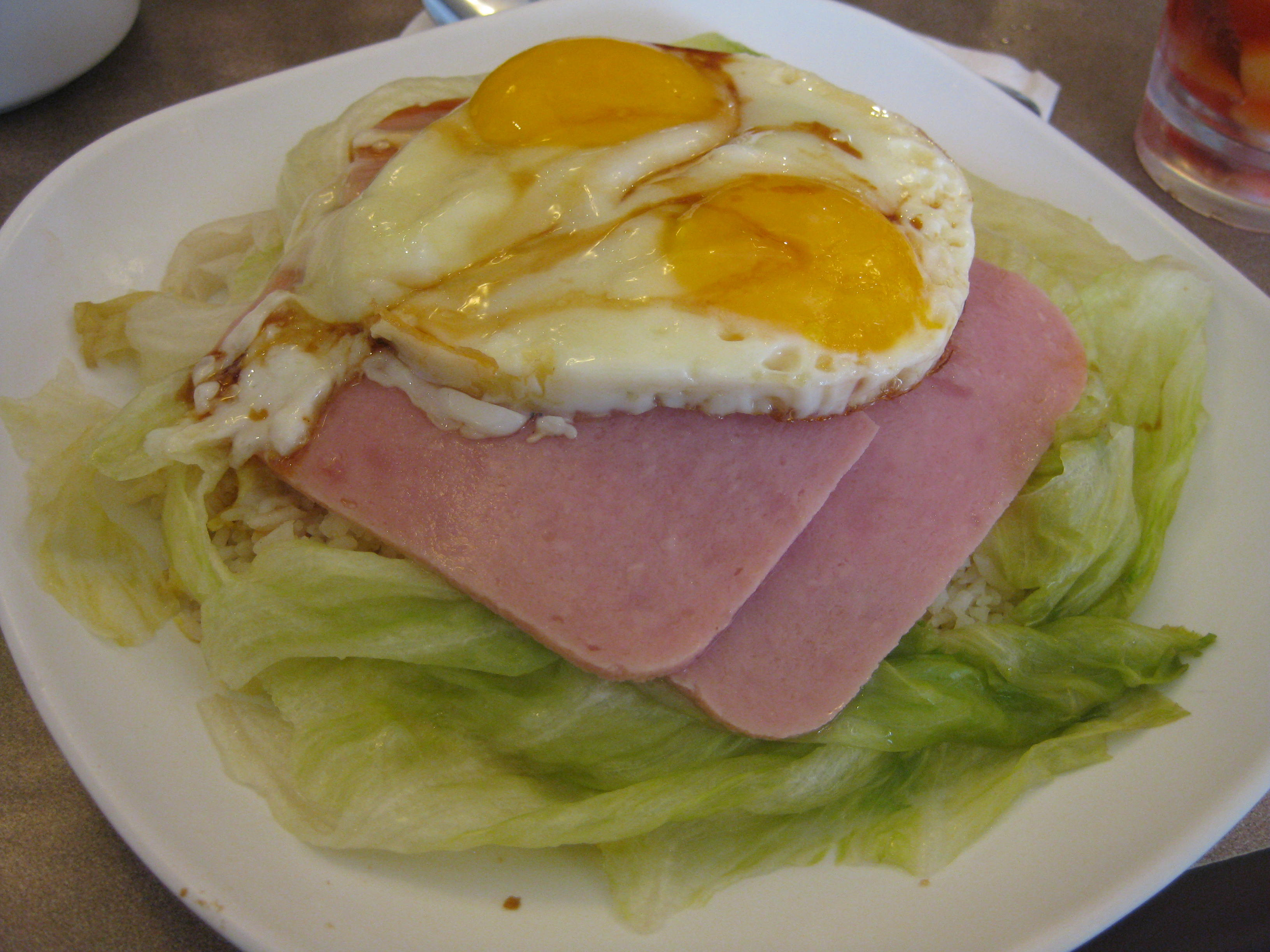
Ham and eggs over rice and served with lettuce

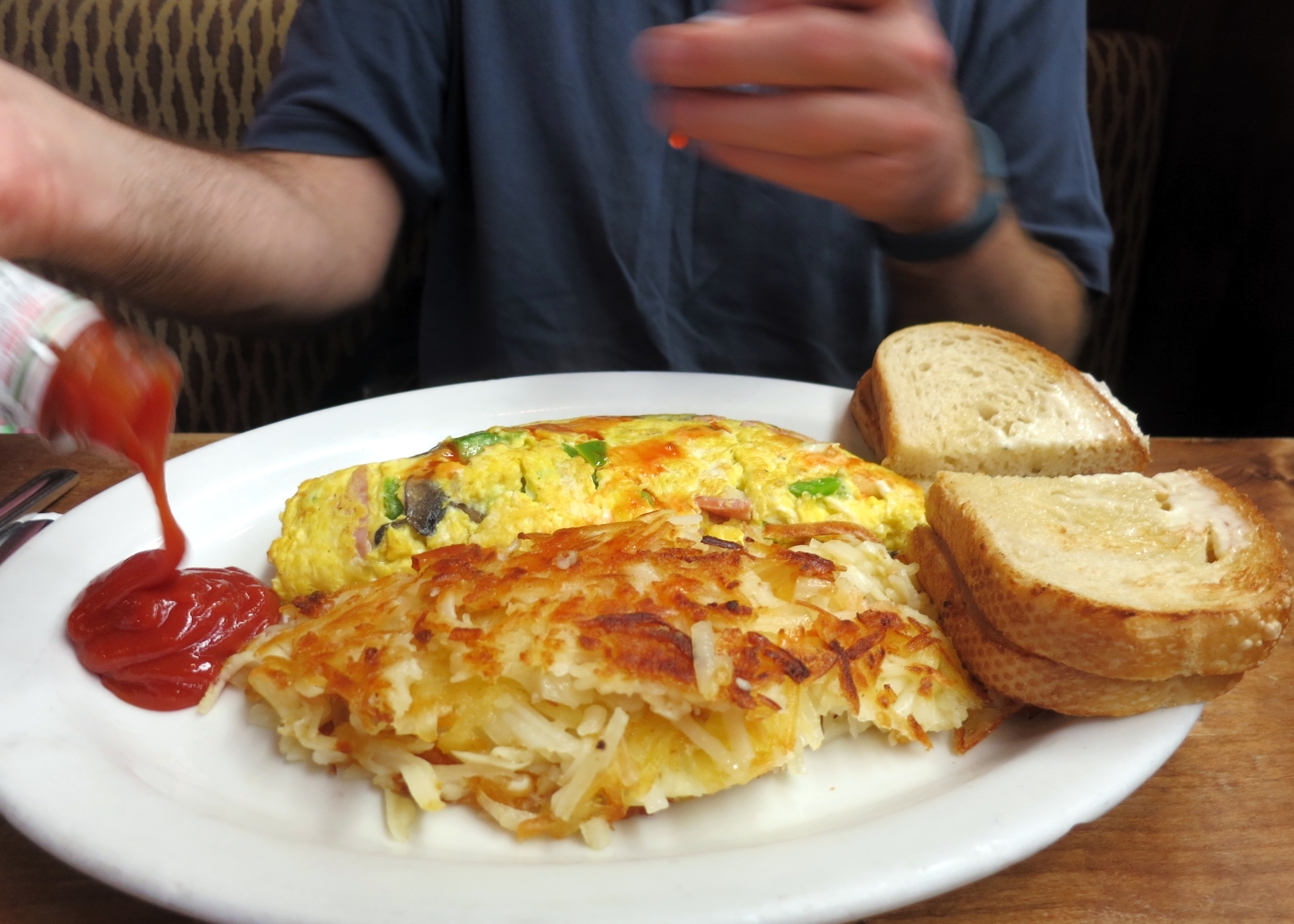
A Denver omelette with toast, hash browns and tomato ketchup

== In culture ==
=== Slang references ===
The term "ham and eggs" and variations of it have had various slang meanings. In rhyming slang it refers to legs; the phrase was also used with this meaning in the U.S. in the 1920s. "Like ham and eggs" refers to things that typically go together and are difficult to separate. To "ham and egg it" is to plug away at something. "Ham and eggs" or "ham and egger" can also refer to an ordinary, unskilled or mediocre person. A specific example of this is a boxer "with a minimum of talent"; "ham and egger" occurs in this context in the original Rocky film, filmed in 1975, when Rocky downplays his chances as a title contender, referring to himself as "really a ham-and-egger". Similarly, "ham and egger" / "ham and egging" are both used in rhyming slang to describe a "beggar", and the act of "begging", respectively.

=== Harriman Alaska Expedition ===
Participants in the Harriman Alaska Expedition of 1899 sometimes referred to the expedition as "the H.A.E." or "Ham and Eggs". Some participants in the expedition later participated in the "Ham and Eggs Club", a group of expedition members in the United States who reunited periodically. The group was formed when Louis Agassiz Fuertes declared in a letter that the H.A.E. had "resolved itself into the Ham and Eggs Club". John Muir hosted meetings in California, and John Burroughs often hosted meetings on the East Coast.

=== In politics ===
The Ham and Eggs Movement was a grassroots movement and organization in California that placed a billion-dollar pension plan on the state ballot in 1938 as a proposed state constitutional amendment, named Proposition 25. Under the proposal, the state would have issued scrip payments to unemployed residents over the age of 50. After 1,103,000 California residents signed a petition, the proposal was voted on a second time in a special election in 1939, but despite what the New York Times called a "huge off-year vote", it was defeated two-to-one.

== See also ==
- Bacon, egg and cheese sandwich – a breakfast sandwich
- Denver sandwich
- Green Eggs and Ham – a children's book by Dr. Seuss
- Ham and cheese sandwich
- Ham and egg bun
- List of breakfast dishes
- List of egg dishes
- List of ham dishes
- Scrambled eggs
