= Fläsklägg med rotmos =

Swedish pork dish

Fläsklägg med rotmos (Swedish pronunciation: [ˈflɛ̂sːklɛɡ meː ˈrûːtmuːs]) is a dish in Swedish cuisine, closely related to German Eisbein. The name literally means "ham hock with root mash."

== Method ==
Cured ham hock is cooked for one to two hours together with onions, carrots, and allspice or similar vegetables. Rutabaga, potatoes and carrots are then diced and cooked soft in the broth, then drained and mashed. It may be served with different kinds of mustard; the preferred one is a traditional sweet mustard. The use of allspice is common in Swedish cuisine.

== See also ==
- List of ham dishes – also includes ham hock dishes
- Stamppot
