= Christmas ham =

Ham eaten for Christmas

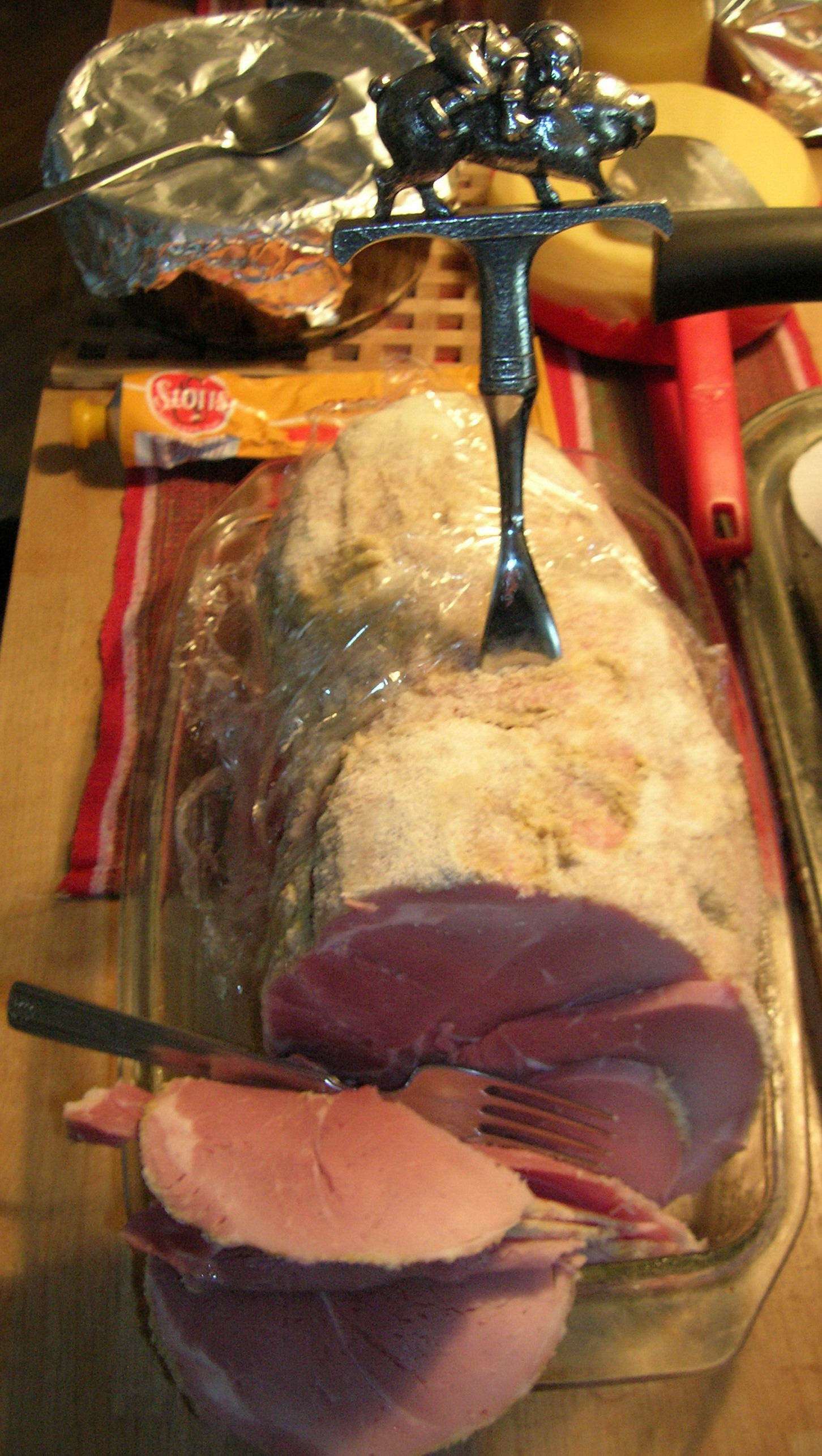
A traditional Swedish Christmas ham

A Christmas ham, or Yule ham, is a ham often served for Christmas dinner or during Yule in Northern Europe and the Anglosphere. The style of preparation varies widely by place and time.

The tradition of eating ham is thought to have evolved from the Germanic pagan ritual of sacrificing a wild boar known as a sonargöltr to the Norse god Freyr during harvest festivals.

== Nordic traditions ==
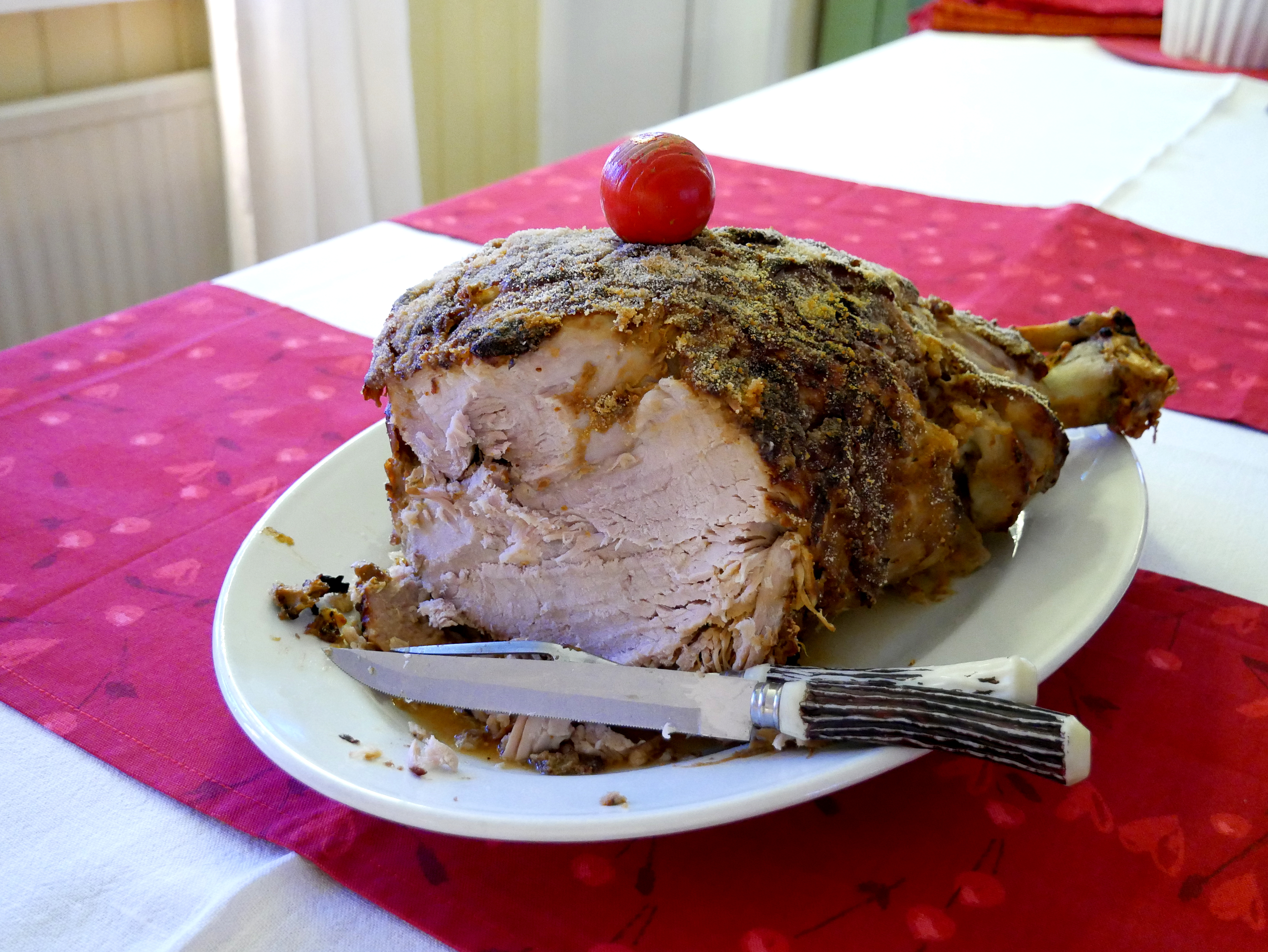
A Finnish Christmas ham

The centerpiece of the cold cuts section of a traditional Swedish Christmas smörgåsbord (at Christmas called "julbord") is a large Christmas ham (a cured ham which has been boiled or baked, then coated with a mixture of egg, breadcrumbs and mustard, browned in the oven).

== American traditions ==
As of 2019, Americans purchase about as much ham as turkey around the holiday season. Ham began being mentioned as a Christmas dish in around 1900, and started growing in popularity in about 1960. The holiday ham began being promoted by Armour & Company in 1916 as part of its marketing efforts for its novel industrially quick-cured and less salty hams. The baked Christmas ham with a clove-studded, diamond-hatched sugar glaze which became popular in the 20th century was introduced in the 1930s. Glazed hams had long been popular long before that, but until the 1880s, they were usually glazed with stock, not sugar, and were not associated with Christmas.

The sugar-glazed ham has become identified with Southern cooking.

There are also various regional recipes. Stuffed ham is popular in southern Maryland, and particularly St. Mary's County, where it is traditional to stuff a corned ham with greens such as kale and cabbage. This tradition has been around in the area for at least 200 years. Similar stuffed hams are also sometimes prepared in Kentucky.

== Australian traditions ==
Ham is a traditional Australian dish that features on most tables on Christmas Day. It is cooked and served in various ways throughout Australia, with many families adding special ingredients, making it an important aspect of a Christmas meal.

As Christmas in Australia comes at the beginning of summer, many people no longer serve a traditional hot roast dinner, serving cold turkey and ham, seafood and salads instead. Christmas ham leftovers are often frozen to make soup and other dishes when the summer is over.

== Filipino traditions ==
In the Philippines and among diaspora groups such as Filipino-Americans, a ham is prepared for Christmas celebrations. The ham is referred to as a hamón, from the Spanish word for "ham", jamón. The hamón is sometimes soaked in kumquat and lime juice. It is similar to, but not to be confused for, hamonado, which is another Filipino dish that can include pork and is also served around the Christmas season.

== See also ==
- List of Christmas dishes
- List of ham dishes

== Bibliography ==
- Tidholm, P.; Lija, A. (2014). "Culture-Tradition: Christmas: A Family Affair". Sweden.se.
