= Stuffed ham =

Ham dish from Maryland, United States

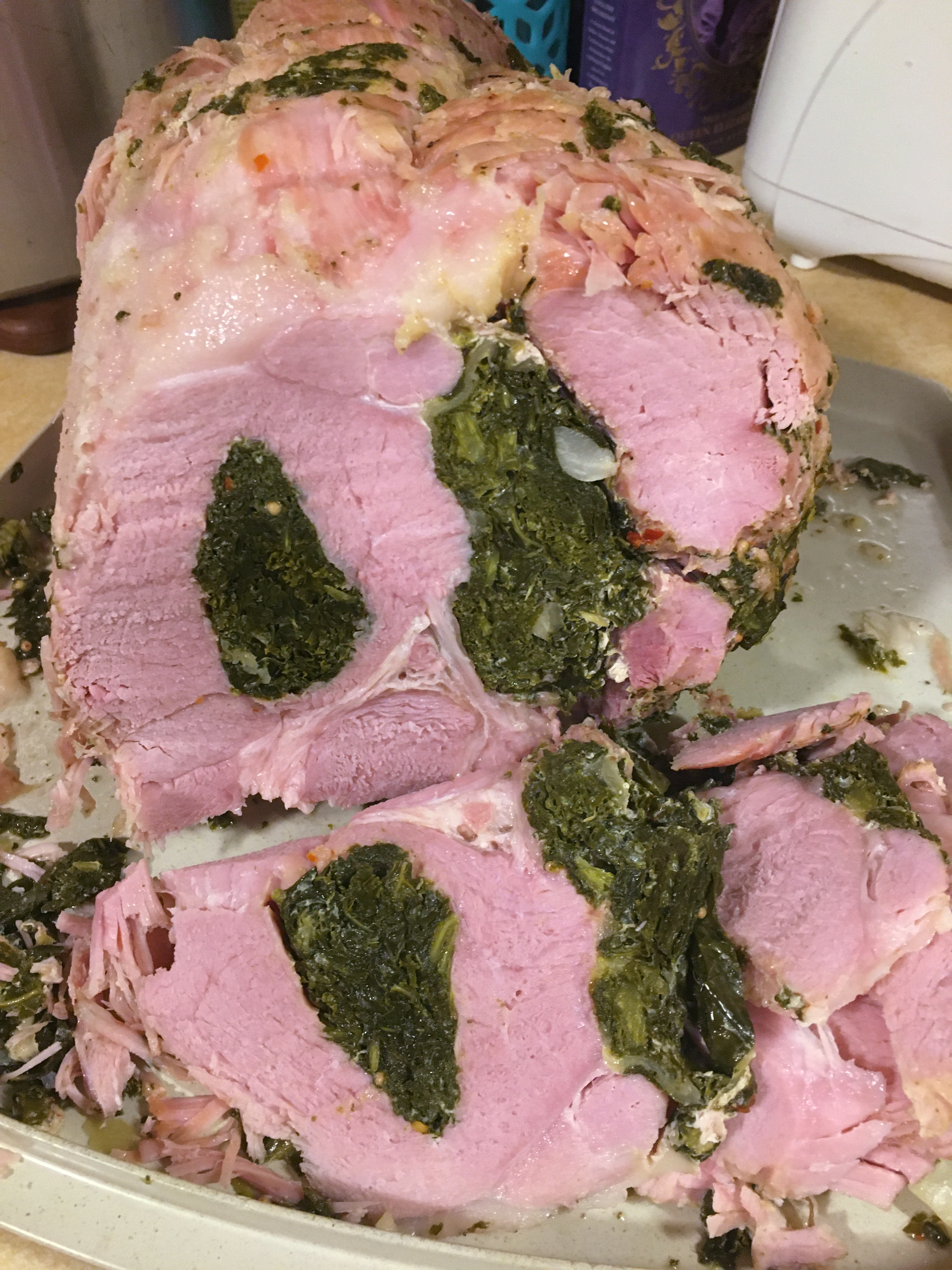
- Maryland stuffed ham
- Alternative names: Maryland stuffed ham
- Place of origin: United States of America
- Region or state: Maryland
- Associated cuisine: Southern
- Main ingredients: Corned ham, greens

Stuffed ham is a variety of ham in which cabbage, kale, onions, spices and seasonings are chopped and mixed, then stuffed into deep slits slashed in a whole corned or smoked ham. The ham is covered with extra stuffing, wrapped in a cloth to hold everything together, and then boiled until the meat and greens are fully cooked. Stuffed ham is believed to have originated in Southern Maryland, specifically in St. Mary's County, and remains popular in that region to this day. Often used as a Christmas ham, this preparation has been popular for at least 200 years. Typically the ham has a distinctively spicy flavor due to added seasoning. Recipes vary widely, since they are traditionally passed down from one family member to another.

== Salmonella vector ==
In 1997, improperly prepared stuffed ham served at the Our Lady of the Wayside Catholic Church fund-raising dinner in Chaptico, Maryland, was responsible for one of the largest multi-drug resistant Salmonella Heidelberg outbreaks in Maryland which sickened 750 people and caused two deaths. The CDC documented the incident in the journal Emerging Infectious Diseases.

== See also ==
- List of ham dishes
- List of smoked foods
- List of stuffed dishes
