= Denver sandwich =

Denver omelet between two pieces of bread

- Alternative names: Western sandwich
- Type: Sandwich
- Place of origin: Denver, Colorado, United States
- Main ingredients: Bread, Denver omelette (ham, onion, green pepper, scrambled eggs)
- Variations: Manhattan Sandwich

A Denver sandwich, also known as a Western sandwich, consists of a Denver omelette (consisting of at least ham, onion, green pepper, and scrambled eggs), sandwiched between two pieces of bread.

The origin of the sandwich is unclear, with its invention attributed to a variety of individuals, including Denver restaurateur Albert A. McVittie in 1907 and M. D. Looney, also of Denver, in the same year. There is also a claim that the "Denver sandwich" was invented at Denver's Tabor Hotel, but mentions of it in newspapers predate all these claimants.

As early as 1908 it was known as the "Western Sandwich", cited in a San Antonio newspaper. A "Manhattan Sandwich" (cited from 1909) was similar in that it contained fried egg, minced ham, and onion.

Food writers James Beard and Evan Jones believed that the Denver or Western sandwich was actually created earlier by "the many Chinese chefs who cooked for logging camps and railroad gangs in the nineteenth and early twentieth centuries" and was probably derived from egg foo young. They believed that the early Denver sandwiches were actually St. Paul sandwiches.

== See also ==
- Ham and eggs
- List of American sandwiches
- List of egg dishes
- List of ham dishes
- List of regional dishes of the United States
- List of sandwiches
- Roti john
- St. Paul sandwich
