= List of ham dishes =

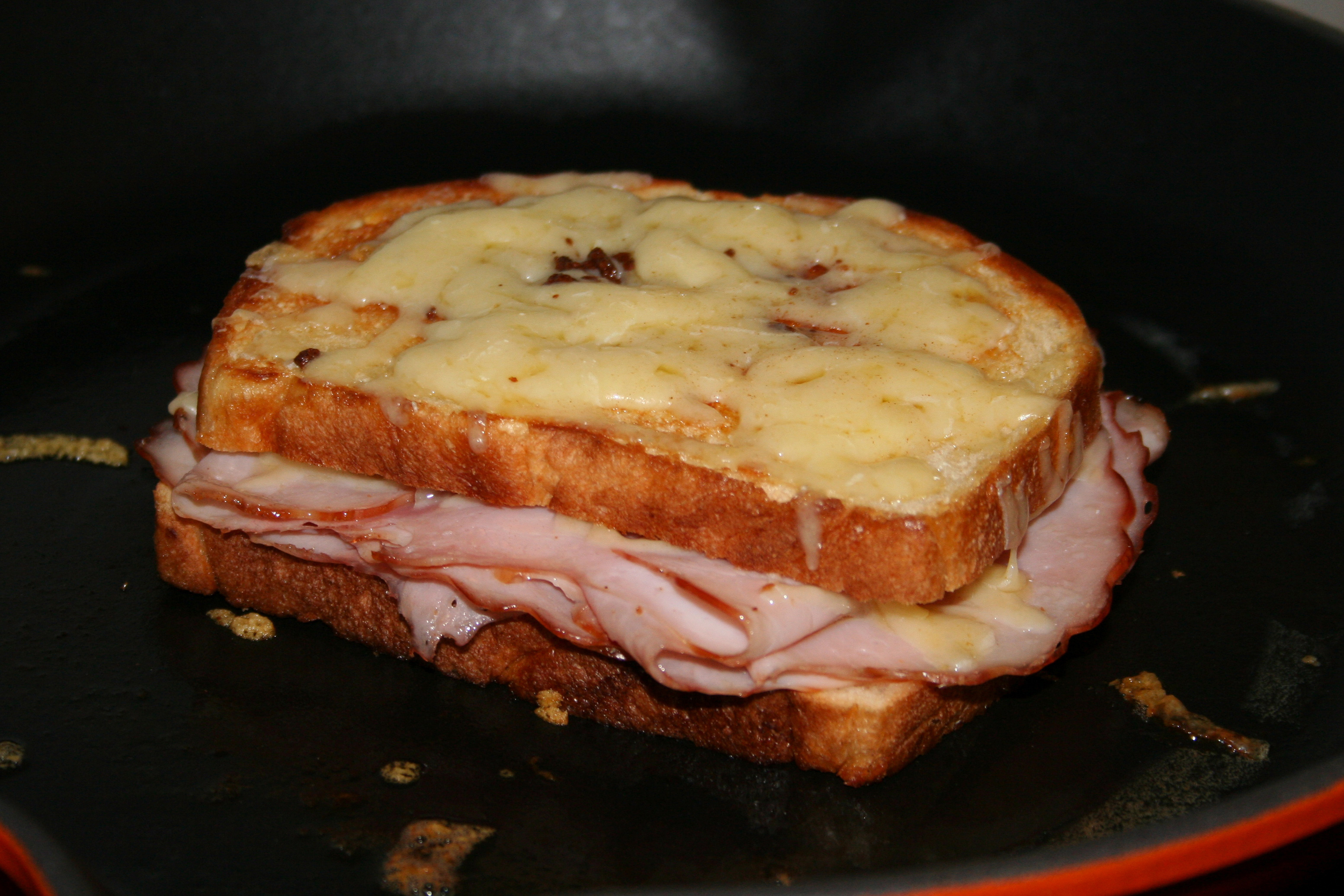
The croque-monsieur is a type of ham and cheese sandwich

This is a list of notable ham dishes. Ham is pork that has been preserved through salting, smoking, or wet curing. It was traditionally made only from the hind leg of swine, and referred to that specific cut of pork. Ham is made around the world, including a number of highly coveted regional specialties. Ham is typically used in its sliced form, often as a filling for sandwiches and similar foods.

This list also contains notable ham hock dishes. A ham hock is the portion of a pig's leg that is neither part of the ham proper nor the foot or ankle, but rather the extreme shank end of the leg bone. It is the joint between the tibia/fibula and the metatarsals of the foot of a pig, where the foot was attached to the hog's leg.

== Ham dishes ==
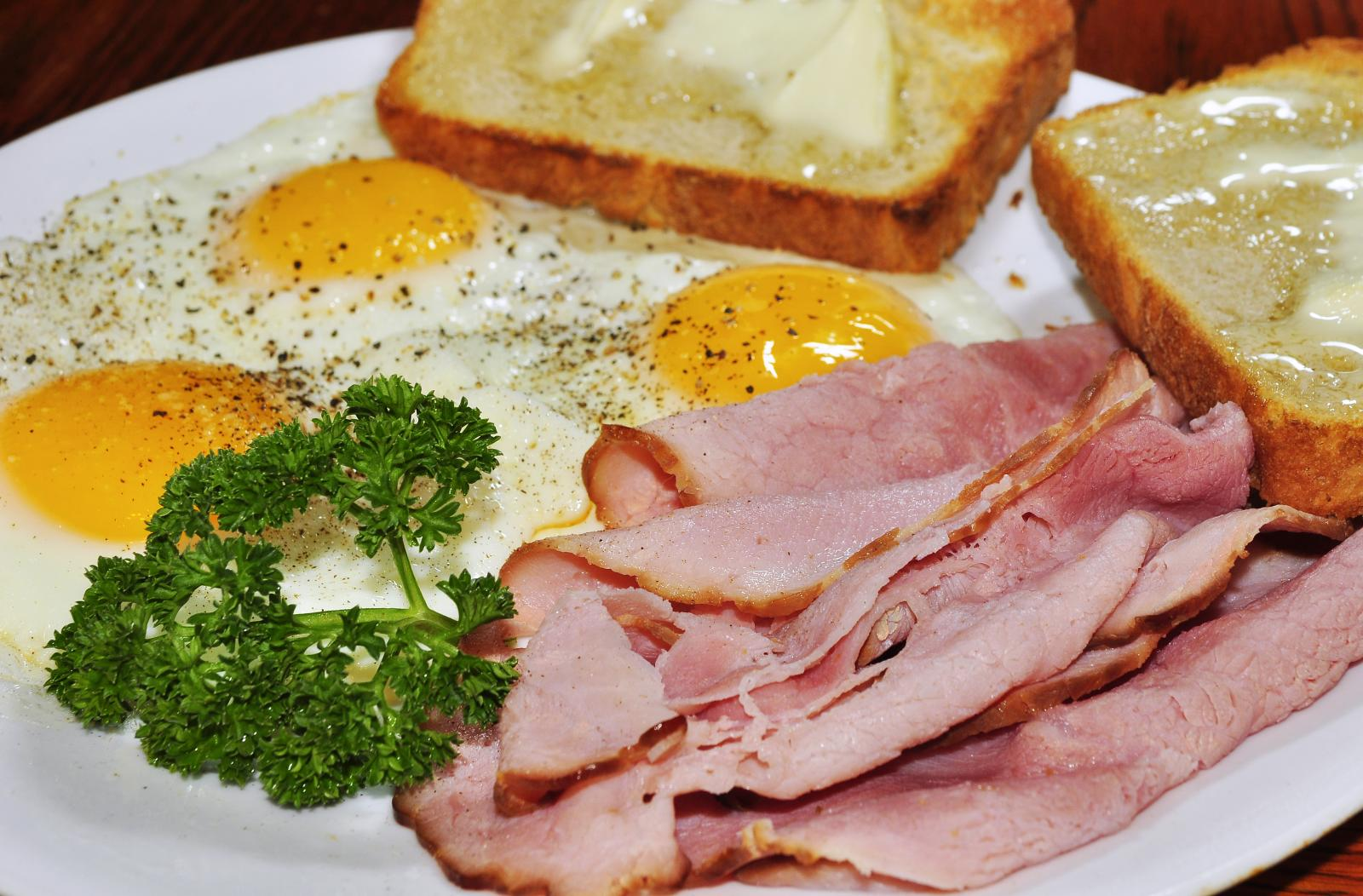
Ham and eggs

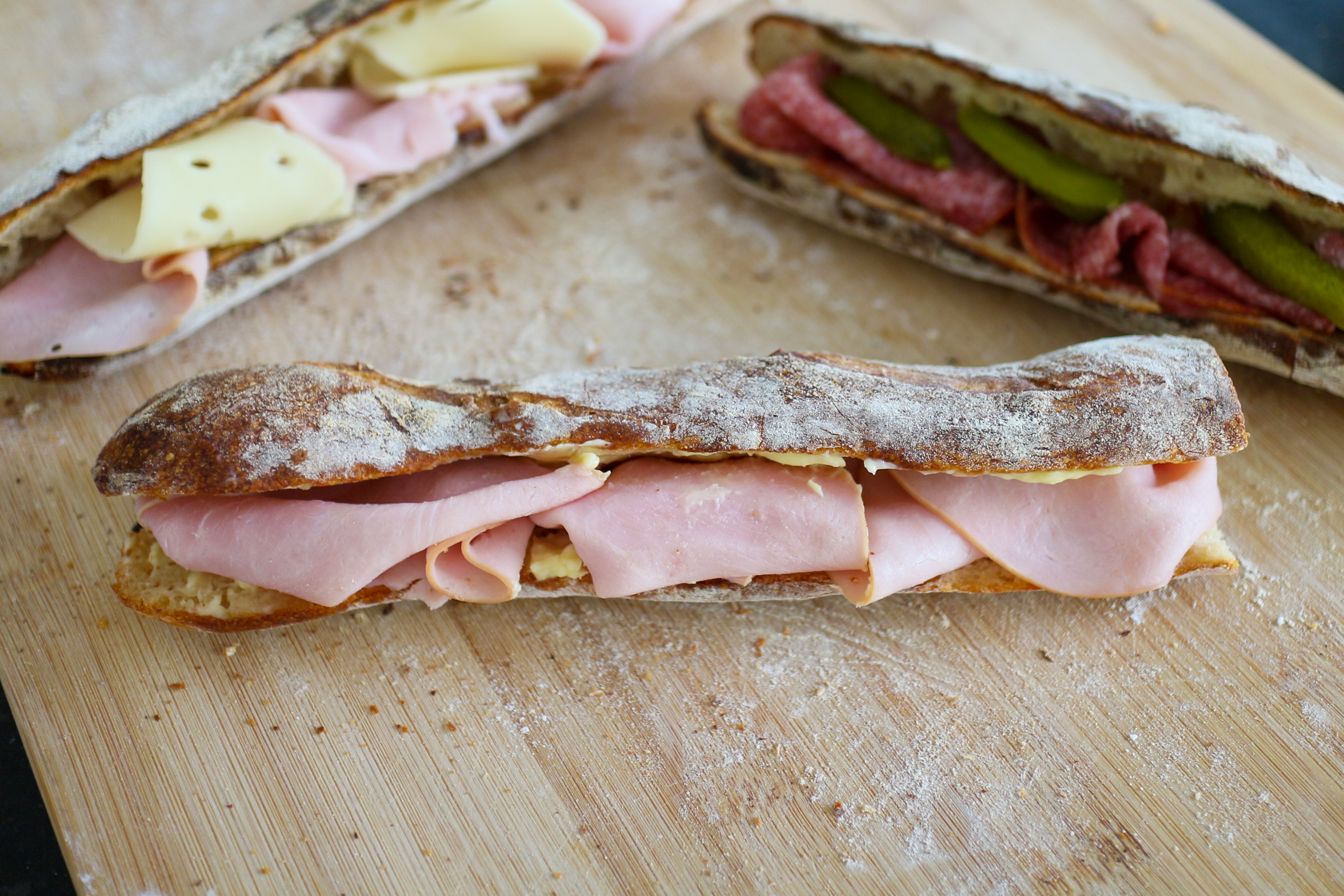
A jambon-beurre

- Budae-jjigae – a stew that includes ham as a main ingredient.
- Christmas ham – a traditional dish associated with modern Christmas and historical Yule. The tradition is believed to have begun among the Norse people as a tribute to Freyr, a god in Norse mythology associated with boars (see Sonargöltr), harvest and fertility.
- Croque-monsieur – French for "mister crunch", it is a baked or fried boiled ham and cheese sandwich. The dish originated in French cafés and bars as a quick snack. A Croque Madame is a version of the dish topped with a fried egg.
- Denver omelette – an omelette filled with diced ham, onions, and green bell peppers.
- Denver sandwich – consists of ham, onions, green bell pepper, and scrambled eggs. Additional ingredients are sometimes used.
- Francesinha – a Portuguese sandwich prepared using wet-cured ham, linguiça, sausage, steak or roast meat and covered with melted cheese.
- Ham and cheese sandwich – Common type of sandwich
- Ham and egg bun – a type of Hong Kong pastry.
- Ham and eggs – a dish combining various preparations of its main ingredients, ham and eggs.
- Ham cordon bleu – Meat and cheese dish
- Ham salad – Anglo-American dish
- Ham sandwich – Common type of sandwich
- Hawaiian pizza – Canadian pizza topped with pineapple
- Jambon – a ham and cheese pastry popular in Ireland.
- Jambon-beurre – a very popular French ham sandwich made of a baguette sliced open, spread with butter, and filled with slices of ham.
- Pan de jamón – a typical Venezuelan Christmas bread, filled with ham, fried bacon, raisins and green olives.
- Schnitz un knepp – a Pennsylvania Dutch dish consisting of ham or pork shoulder with dried apples and dumplings.
- Stuffed ham – from southern Maryland, a corned ham stuffed with seasoned greens.
- Toast Hawaii – a slice of toast that is topped with ham, cheese, a slice of pineapple, and a maraschino cherry.
Ham dishes

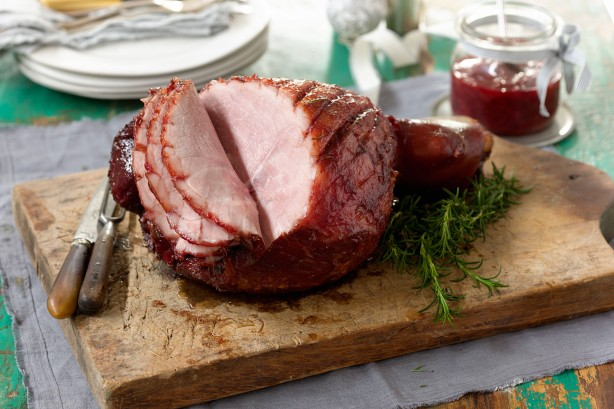
Christmas ham in Australia

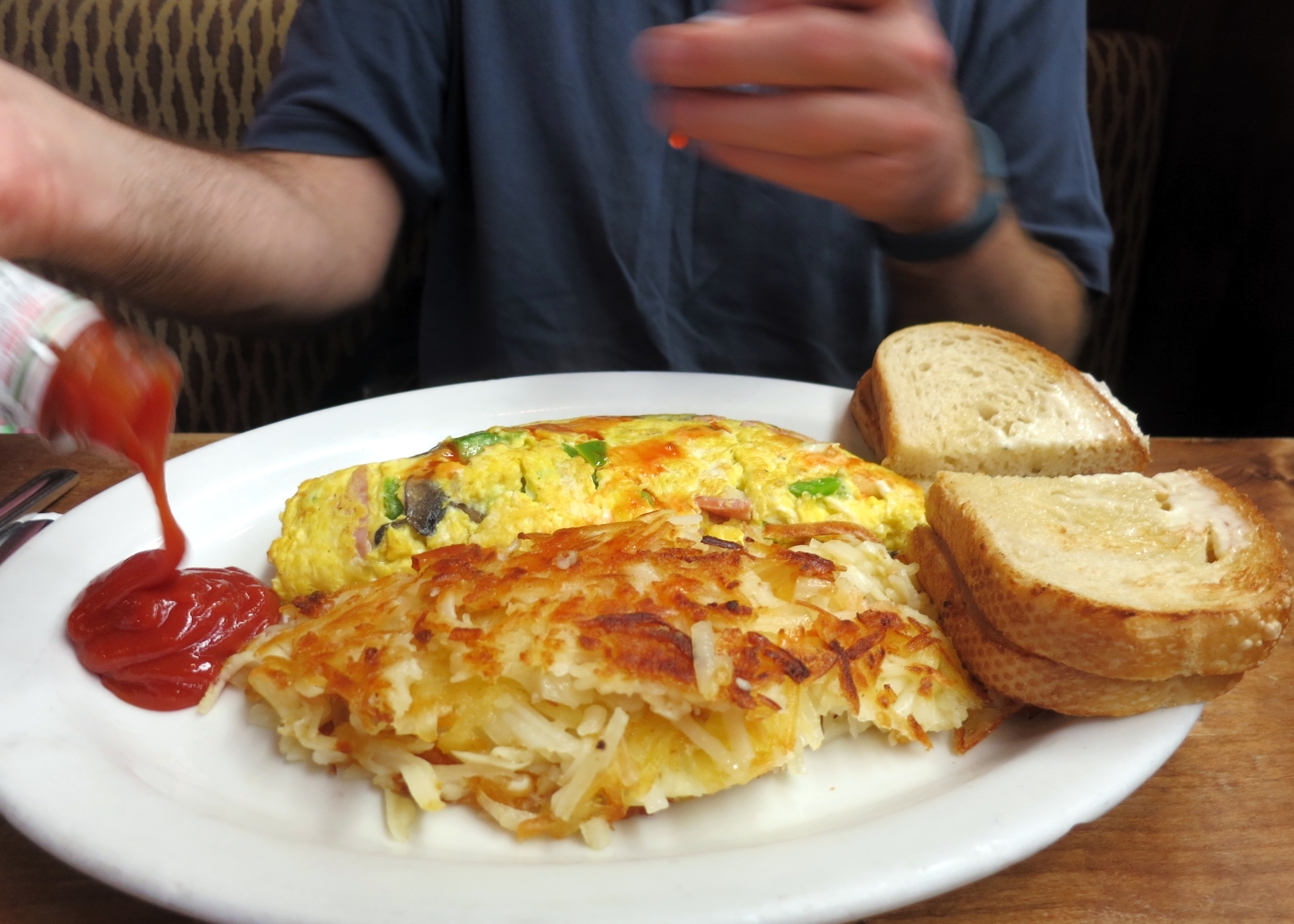
A Denver omelette (at top)

A Denver sandwich

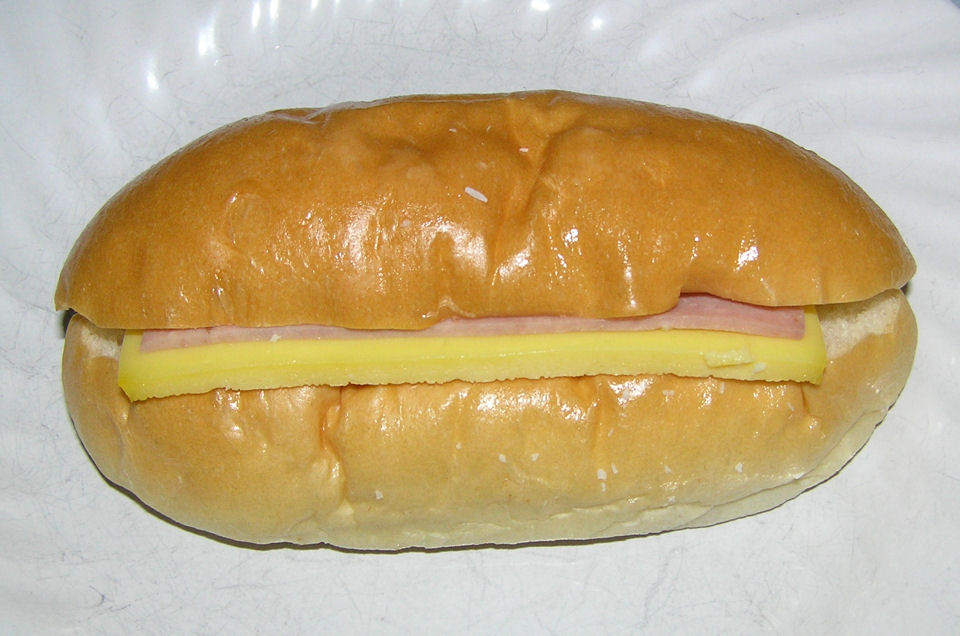
A ham and egg bun

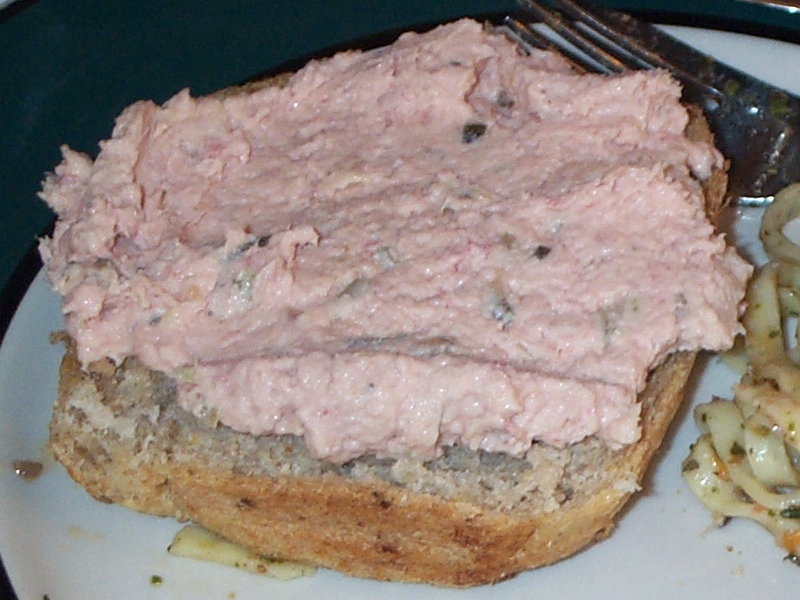
A ham salad spread, atop bread

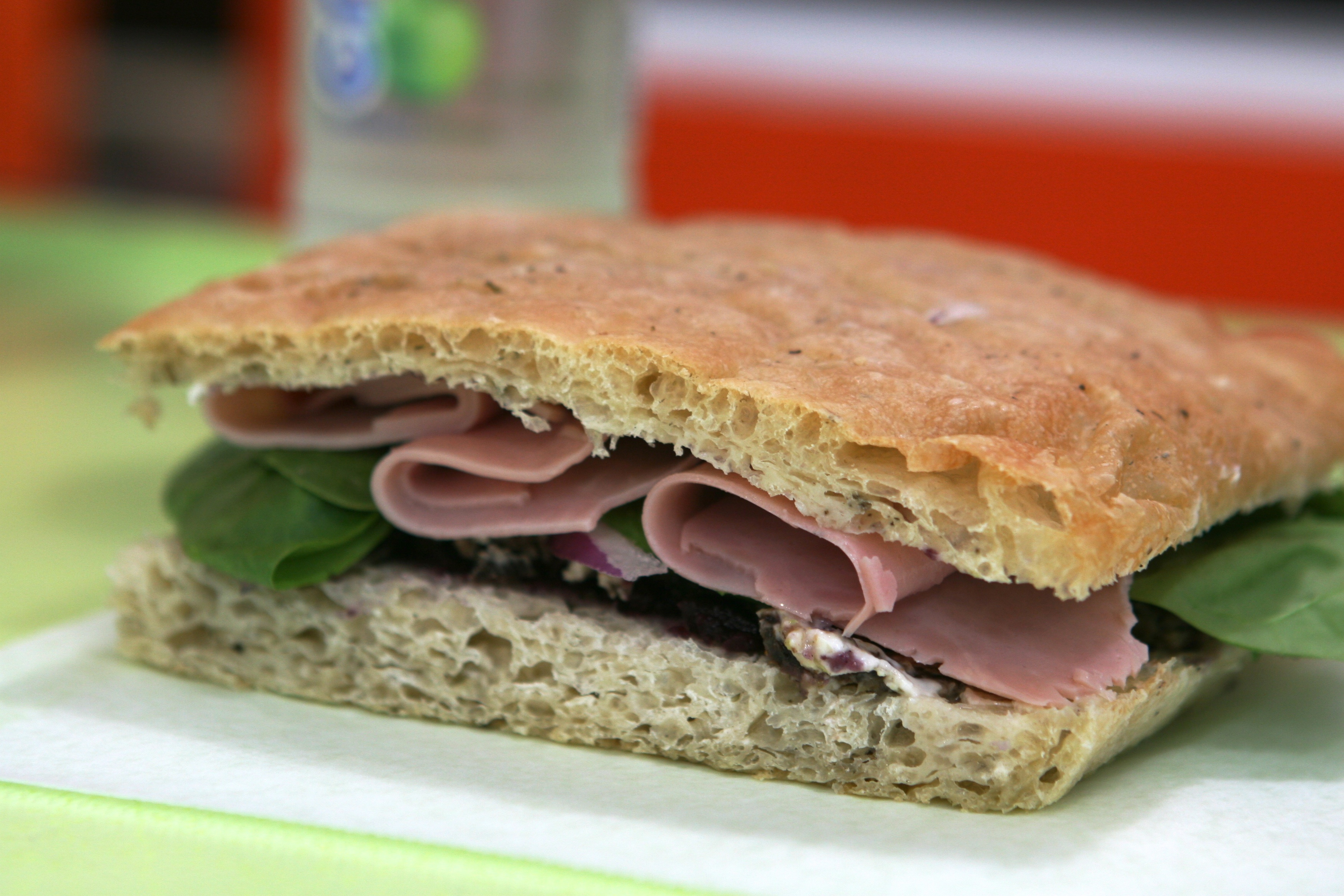
A ham sandwich

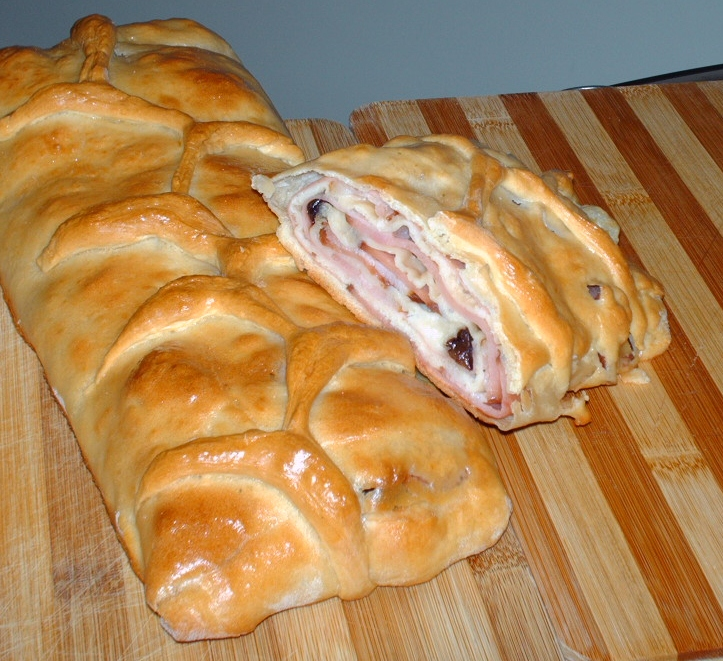
Pan de jamón

== Ham hock dishes ==
- Amish preaching soup – An American bean soup sometimes prepared using ham hocks
- Crispy pata - a Filipino dish consisting of deep fried pig trotters or knuckles served with a soy-vinegar dip.
- Eisbein – a German culinary dish of pickled ham hock, usually cured and slightly boiled
- Fläsklägg med rotmos – a Swedish dish prepared using ham hock, carrot, onion, potatoes, rutabaga and allspice. It is sometimes served with mustard.
- Paksiw na pata - a Filipino dish consisted of ham hock cooked in ingredients similar to those in adobo but with the addition of sugar and banana blossoms to make it sweeter and water to keep the meat moist and to yield a rich sauce.
- Pata tim - a Filipino braised pork hock dish slow-cooked until very tender in soy sauce, black peppercorns, garlic, bay leaves, and star anise sweetened with muscovado sugar.
- Schweinshaxe – a German dish consisting of a roasted ham hock
- Senate bean soup – an American soup made with navy beans, ham hocks, and onion. It is served in the dining room of the United States Senate every day, in a tradition that dates back to the early 20th century.
Ham hock dishes

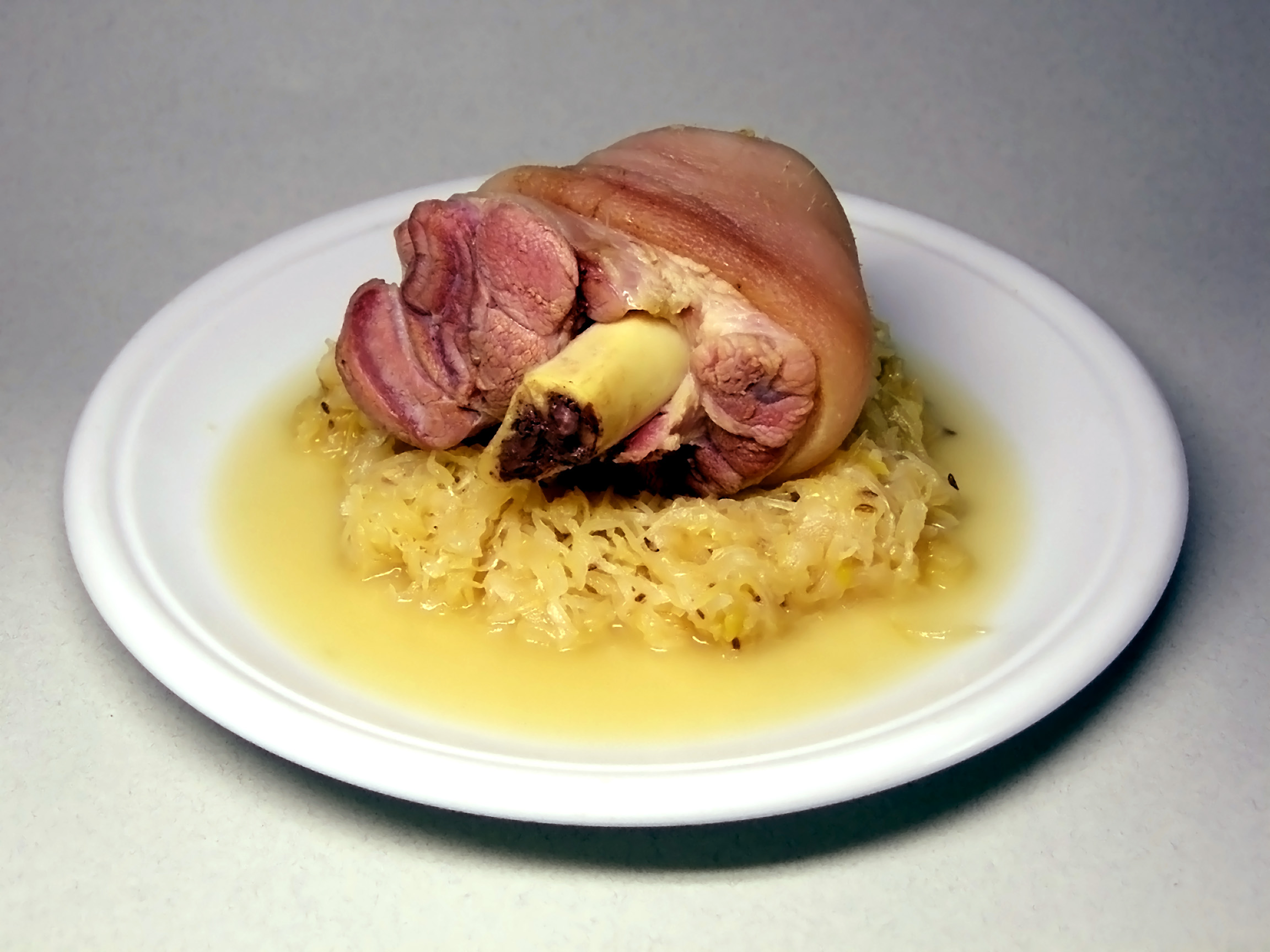
Pickled eisbein with sauerkraut

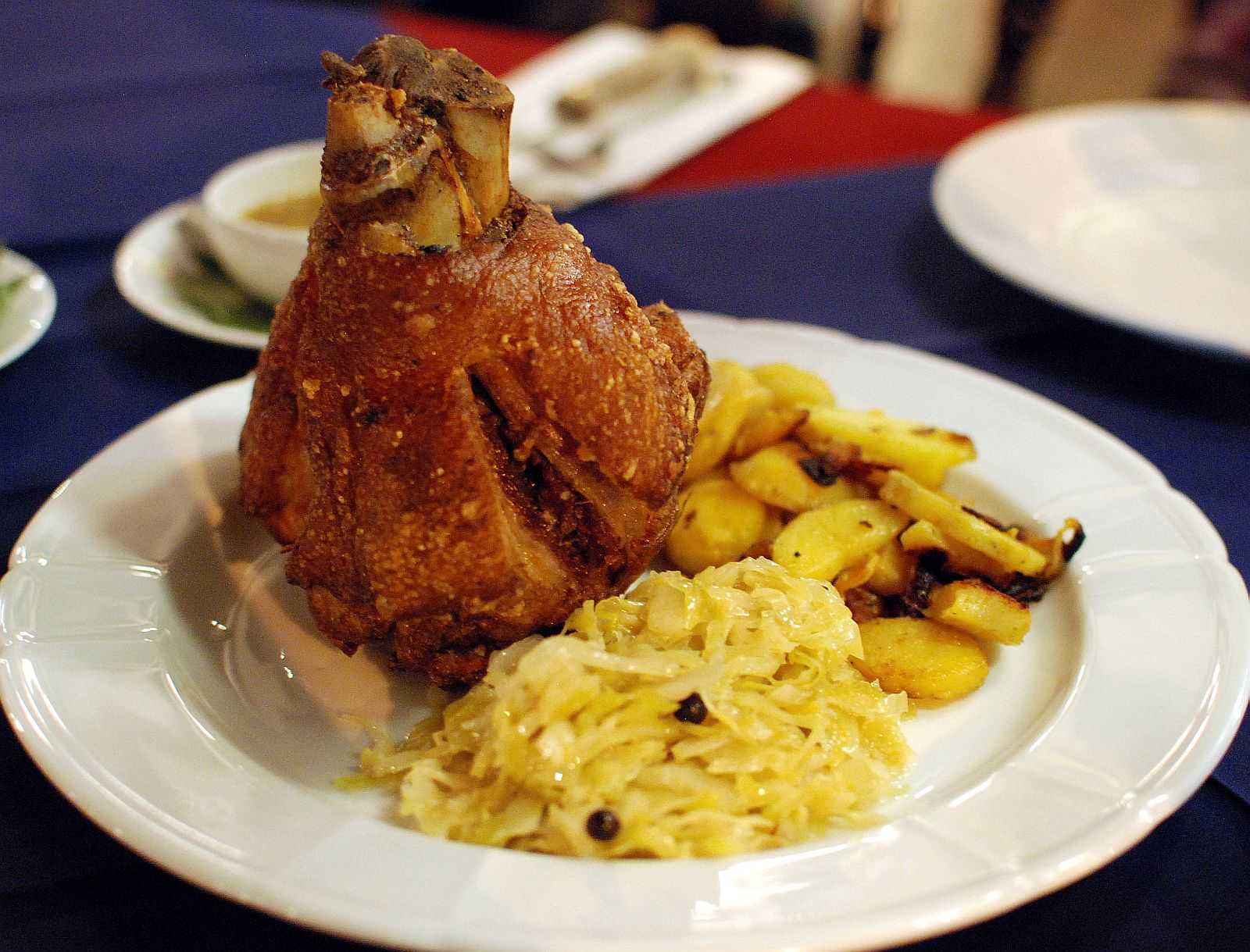
Schweinshaxe served with fried potatoes and sauerkraut at a restaurant in Thailand

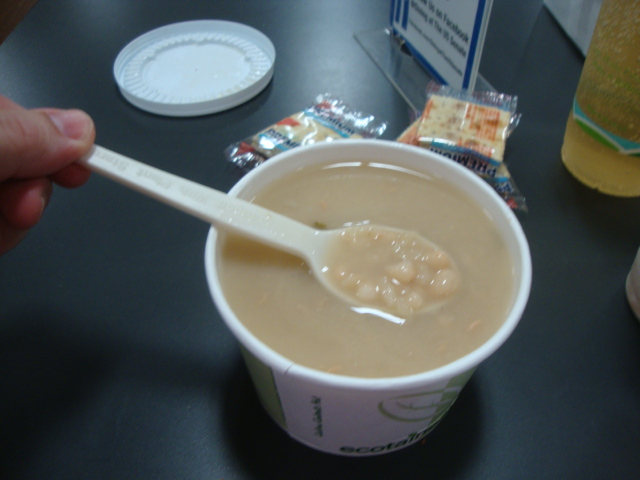
Senate bean soup at the Dirksen Senate Office Building

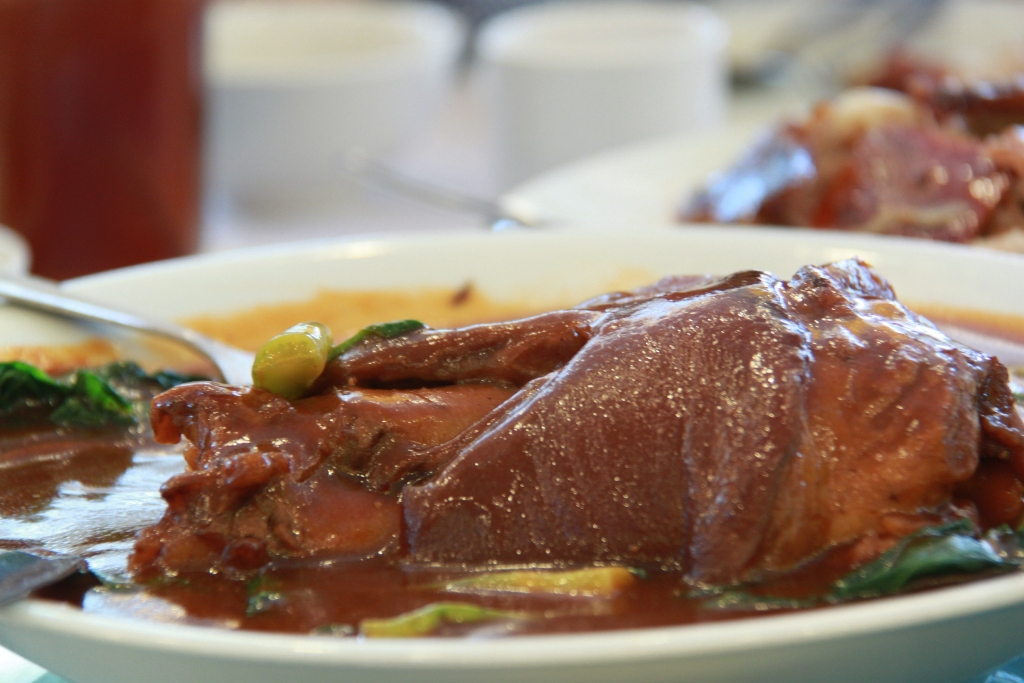
Pata tim from the Philippines

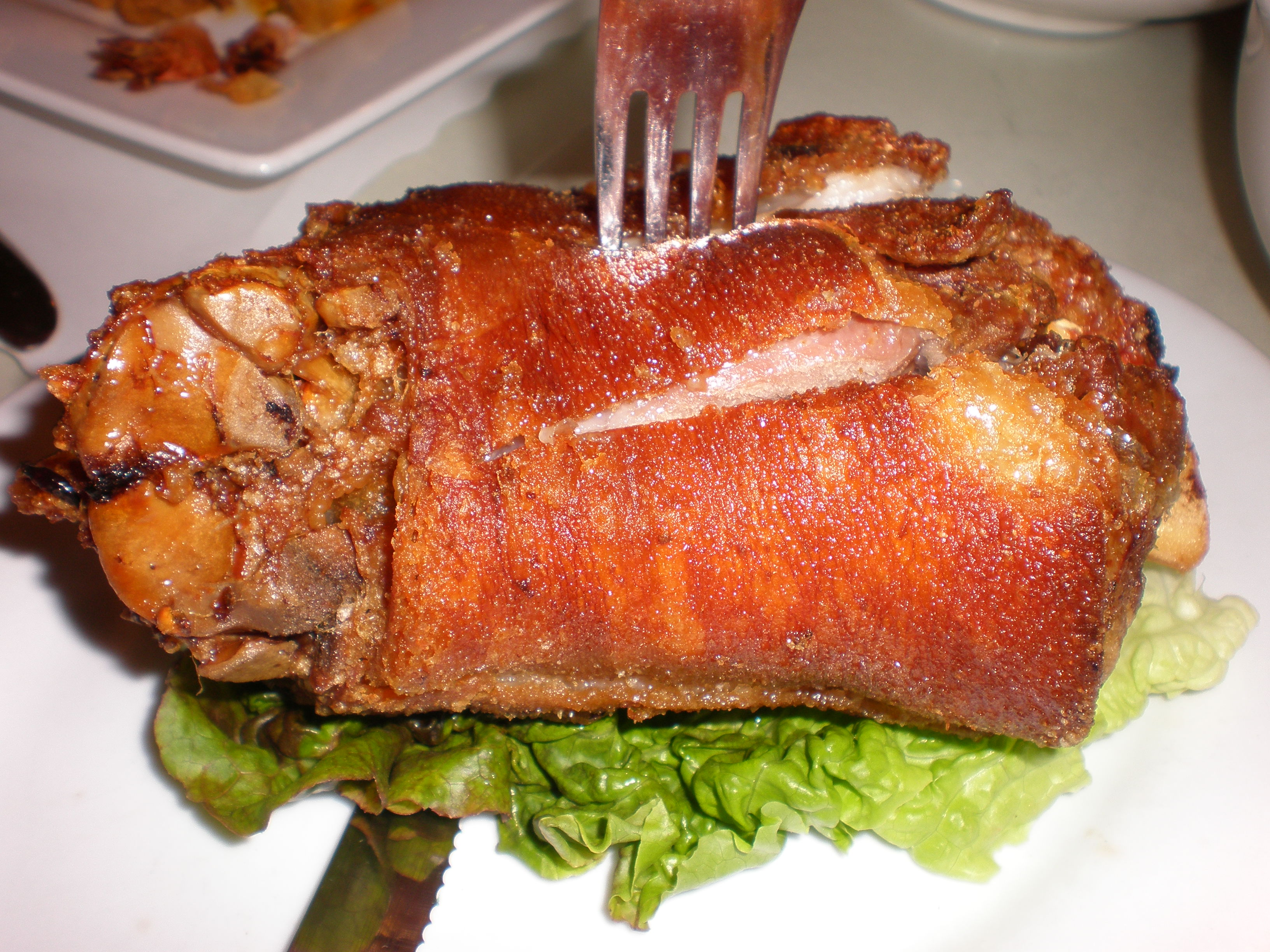
Crispy pata from the Philippines

== See also ==
- Bacon, egg and cheese sandwich
- Deviled ham
- Ham sausage
- Honey Baked Ham
- List of bacon dishes
- List of hams
- List of pork dishes
