= Ham salad =

Anglo-American dish

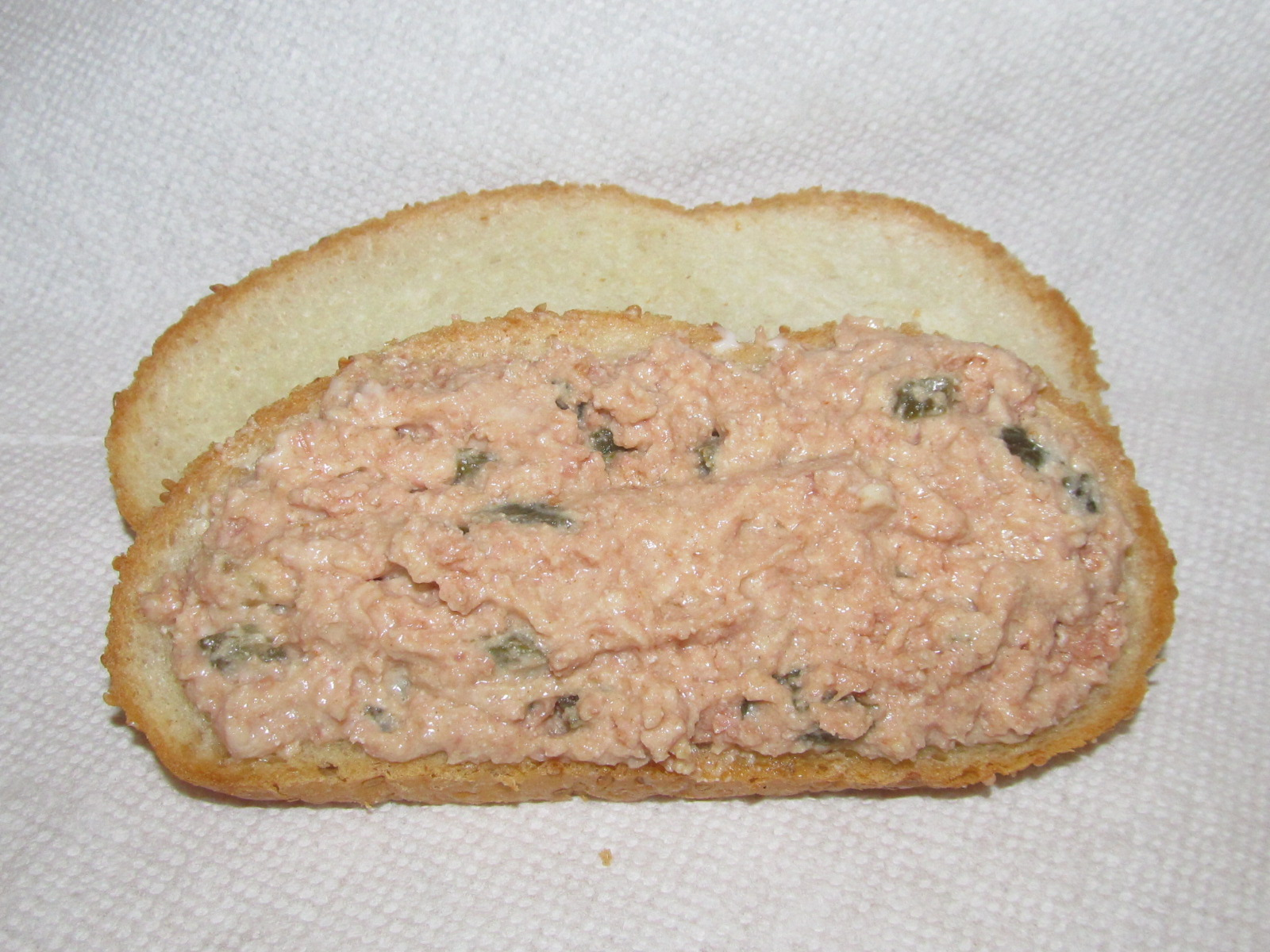
- Ham salad spread on bread
- Type: Salad or spread
- Place of origin: North America
- Region or state: American South, American Midwest
- Associated cuisine: American cuisine, Canadian cuisine, Australian cuisine
- Serving temperature: Cold
- Main ingredients: Ham; mayonnaise or salad dressing
- Ingredients generally used: Sour or sweet pickles or pickle relish; mustard; celery; onion; hard-boiled egg
- Similar dishes: Wurstsalat; deviled ham; salad Olivier; chicken salad; tuna salad

Ham salad is a traditional Anglo-American salad. Ham salad resembles chicken salad, egg salad, and tuna salad (as well as starch-based salads, like potato salad, macaroni salad, and pea salad): the primary ingredient, ham, is mixed with smaller amounts of chopped vegetables or relishes, and the whole is bound with liberal amounts of a mayonnaise, salad cream, or other similar style of salad dressing, such as Miracle Whip.

== Overview ==
Ham salad generally includes cooked or canned cold ham which has been minced, cubed, or ground; the mayonnaise or other dressing; diced sour or sweet cucumber pickles or cucumber pickle relish; and perhaps chopped raw celery, green pepper, or onion. Raw cucumber, shredded carrot, pimento, sweet corn kernels, or tomato are sometimes used. The salad can be mixed or garnished with generous quantities of chopped hard-boiled egg; grated cheese may be used, or peas or boiled potato may be added to bulk out the dish. The salad is typically chilled and served cold.

Like other mayonnaise-bound meat salads, the finished dish typically has a chunky, grainy, or pasty texture, and is frequently served as a spread upon crackers or upon bread in a sandwich.

As with other Anglo-American salads, the recipe for ham salad has many regional and family variations. Similar salads are made using chopped or ground bologna, Spam, and other cured or potted meats and sausages.

Ham salad is popular in the Upper Midwest, Mid-Atlantic and Southeastern regions of the United States, which have long histories of pork and ham production.

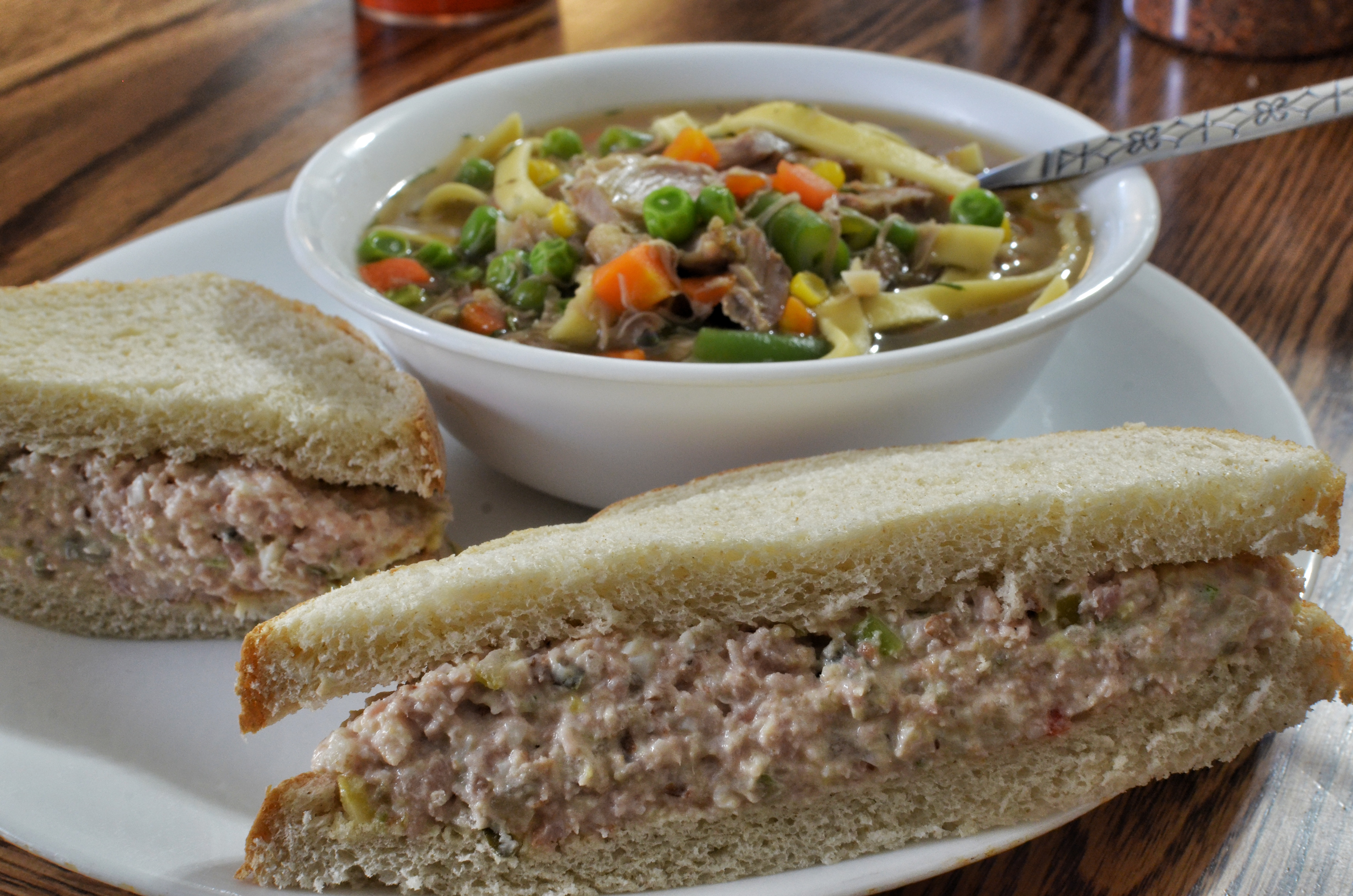
A ham salad sandwich with soup

== See also ==
- Deviled ham
- List of ham dishes
- Salad Olivier
- Wurstsalat
