= Senate bean soup =

Soup served in the United States Senate

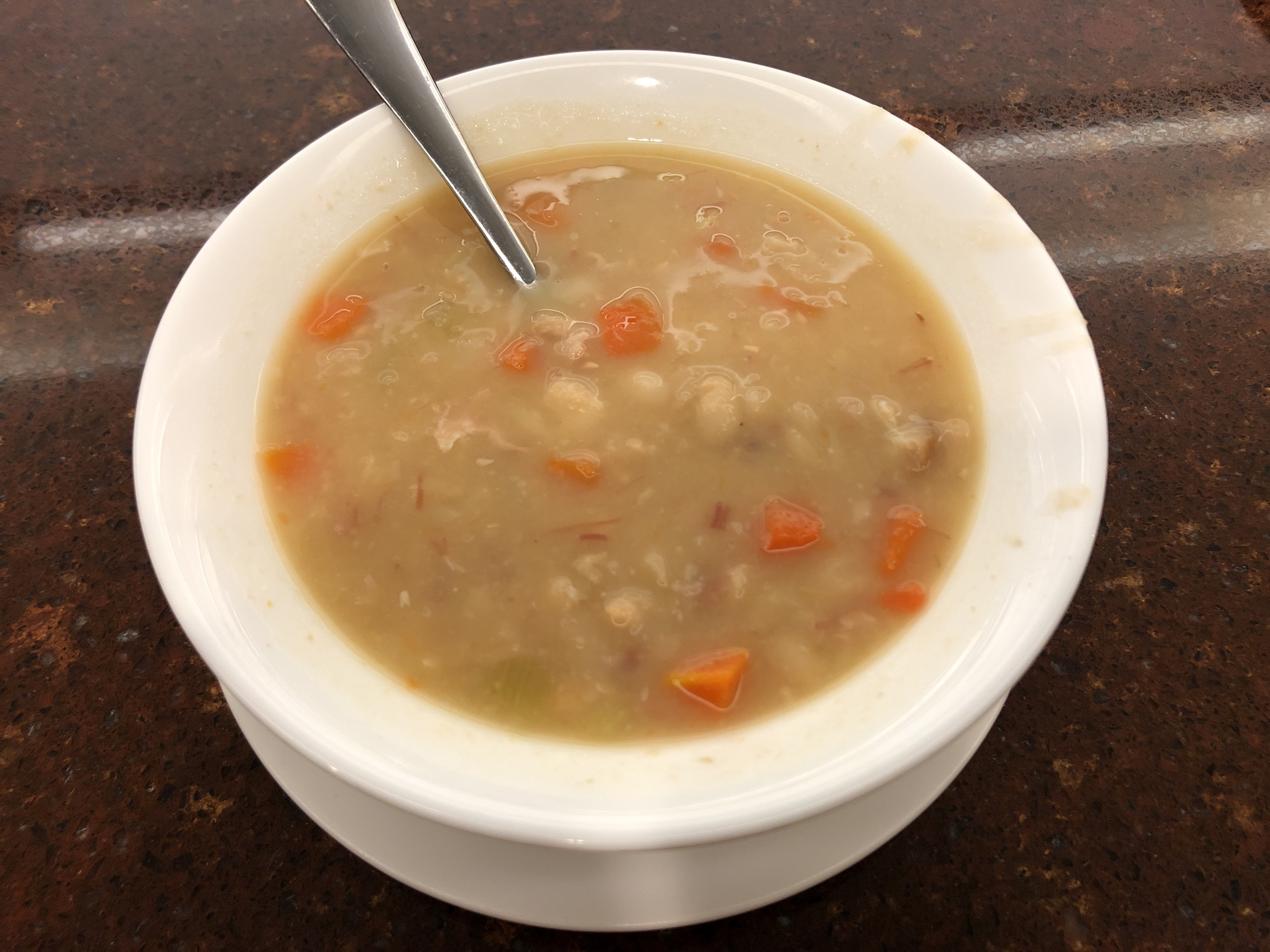
- Senate bean soup at the Capitol Visitor Center
- Alternative names: U.S. Senate Bean Soup
- Course: Soup
- Place of origin: United States
- Region or state: United States Senate
- Main ingredients: Navy beans, ham hocks, sometimes mashed potatoes

United States Senate Bean Soup or simply Senate bean soup is a soup made with navy beans, ham hocks, and onion. It is served in the dining room of the United States Senate every day, in a tradition that dates back to the early 20th century. The original version included celery, garlic, and parsley.

== Tradition ==
According to the Senate website, "Bean soup is on the menu in the Senate's restaurant every day. There are several stories about the origin of that mandate, but none has been corroborated."

On September 14, 1943, rationing due to World War II left the Senate kitchen without enough navy beans to serve the soup. The Washington Times-Herald reported on its absence the following day. In a speech on the Senate floor in 1988, Bob Dole recounted the response to the crisis: "Somehow, by the next day, more beans were found and bowls of bean soup have been ladled up without interruption ever since."

== Recipes ==
=== Senate versions ===
A 1967 memo from the Architect of the Capitol to the Librarian of the Senate describes the modern recipe, calling for "two pounds [900 g] of small Michigan Navy Beans".

John Egerton writes in Southern Food that the use of ham hocks suggests an origin in Southern cuisine. Although the legislators credited with institutionalizing the soup did not represent Southern states, most of the cooks at the time were black Southerners who would prepare bean soup in their own style. There was a period when the Senate dining services omitted the ham and instead used a soup base. In 1984, a new manager discovered this practice; he later reflected, "we went back to the ham hocks, and there was a real difference."

=== Reviews ===
According to The Best Soups in the World, "most reports ... suggest that it unfortunately leaves a lot to be desired."

== Availability ==
As of 2010, people authorized by a letter from a senator may eat in the Senate dining room. There is a dress code. The soup is also available to the general public at the Capitol Visitor Center restaurant on a rotating basis and in the Longworth Cafeteria.

The Project Greek Island bunker, a Cold War-era emergency relocation center for Congress, included a cafeteria that would have served Senate bean soup.

Past prices for a bowl include:

- 1940: $0.15
- 1996: $1.00
- 1997: $1.10
- 2004: $4.50
- 2008: $5.00
- 2010: $6.00
- 2014: $3.60 for a 16-ounce (450 g) bowl

== See also ==
- List of bean soups
- List of ham dishes – also includes ham hock dishes
- List of legume dishes
- Traditions of the United States Senate
