= Jambon-beurre =

French sandwich of baguette, ham and butter

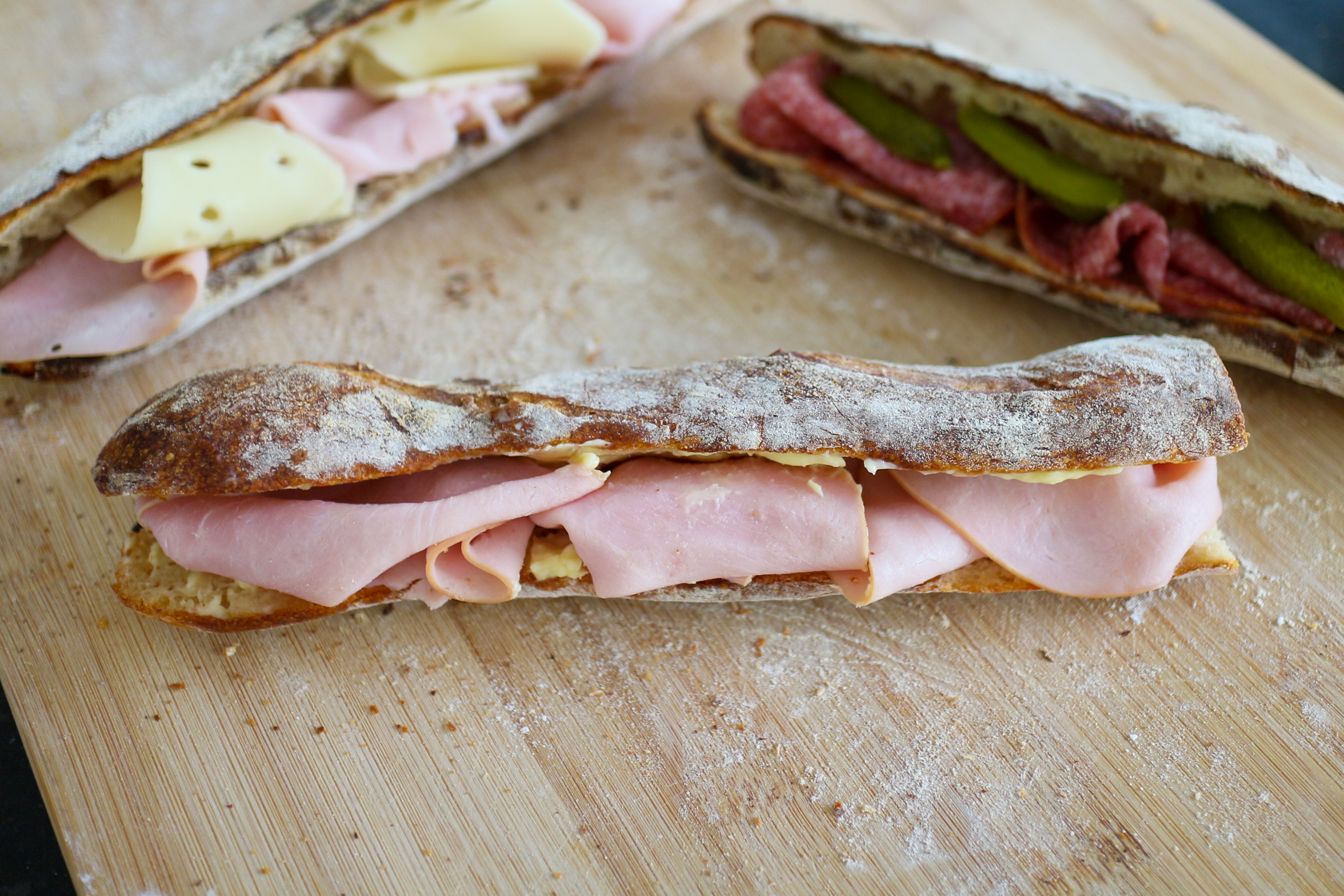
Classic jambon-beurre (foreground)

A jambon-beurre (French for 'ham-butter'; pronounced [ʒɑ̃bɔ̃ bœʁ]), also known as a parisien, is a French ham sandwich made of a baguette sliced open, spread with butter and filled with slices of ham. More than three million jambon-beurre sandwiches are sold in France each day, more than any other kind of sandwich, except for hamburgers.

== See also ==
- List of French dishes
- List of ham dishes
- List of sandwiches
