= Ham and Eggs movement =

1930s old-age pension movement in California. U.S.

The Ham and Eggs movement was an old-age pension movement in California during the 1930s. It was founded by Robert Noble, a controversial radio personality, and Willis Allen. It grew out of a pension movement similar to the one advocated by Francis Townsend. The Ham and Eggs lobby wanted a massive state pension apparatus and inundated the State Legislature with mail. At one time, their movement had almost one million members. However, their proposal was defeated in an initiative election on November 7, 1939.

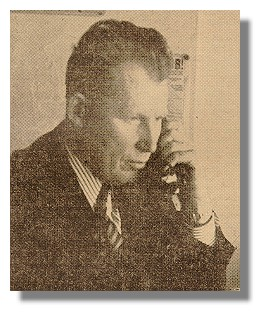
Willis Allen

Robert Noble was later arrested on charges of pro-Nazism during World War II. Willis and Lawrence Allen, brothers who owned a radio station south of the Mexican border, took over the movement. The brothers' adviser and spokeswoman was Gertrude Coogan, an investment counselor. They were proponents of Proposition 25, 1938, which was the idea of Irving Fisher.

... anyone qualified to vote in California and aged fifty or older without a job would receive $30 of "warrants" every week. Each $1 warrant would require a two-cent tax paid weekly to keep the note valid until redeemed. The warrants would be legal tender for payment of state taxes.

It was assumed that to avoid paying the weekly taxes on the money, the tender would be spent immediately, thus boosting the depressed economy. A cited example was the opportunity to trade up in foodstuffs from breakfast oatmeal to ham and eggs, hence the name 'Ham and Eggs Movement'. While it may not have had an effect on the economy, similar plans gave Social Security a more moderate face.

== See also ==
- Demurrage currency
- Ham and eggs
- Will H. Kindig, sponsored the Ham and Eggs Movement
