= Ham sandwich =

Common type of sandwich

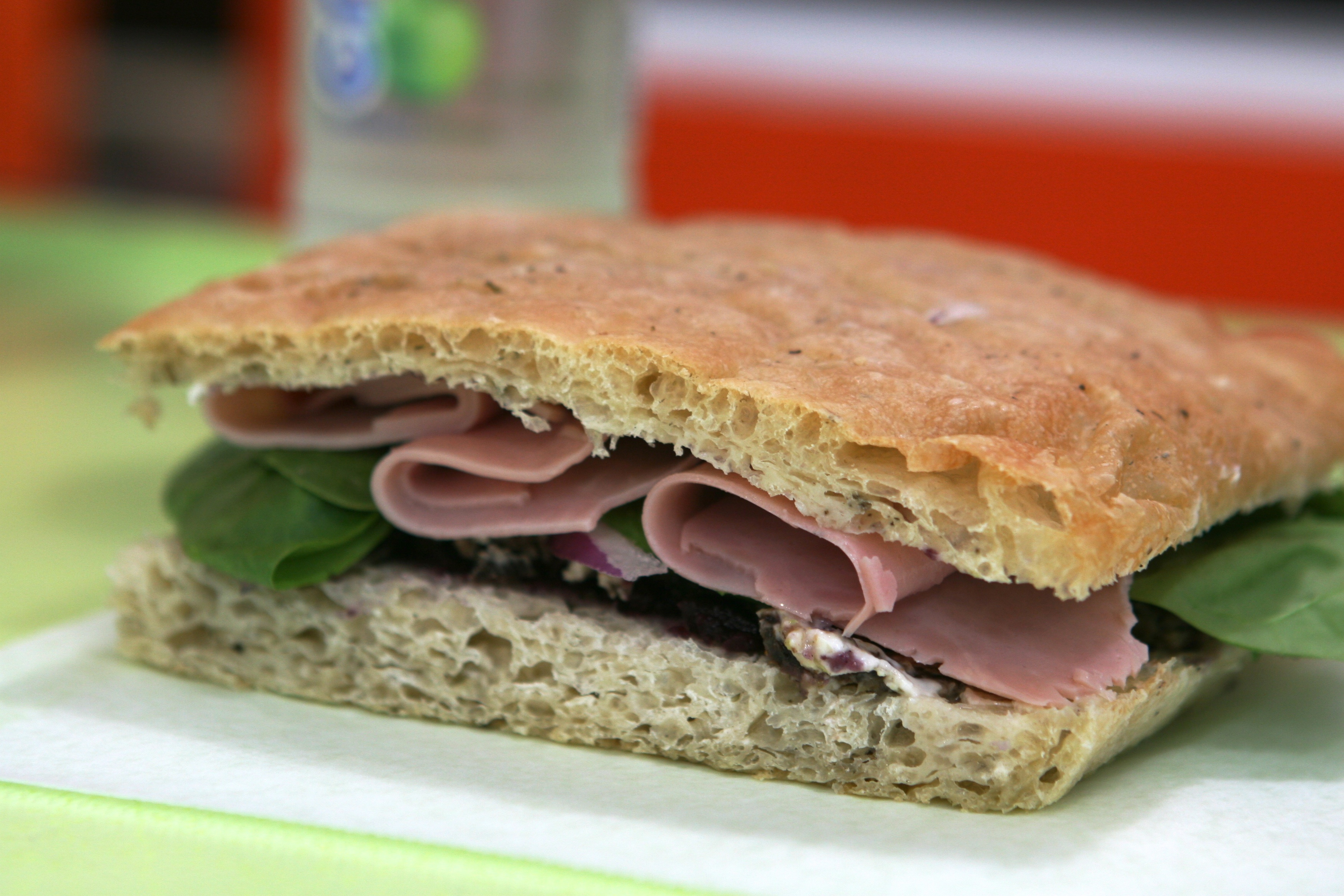
- Ham sandwich made with focaccia, with lettuce and mustard
- Type: Sandwich
- Place of origin: United Kingdom
- Main ingredients: Two pieces of sliced bread, sliced ham

Ham and cheese sandwich
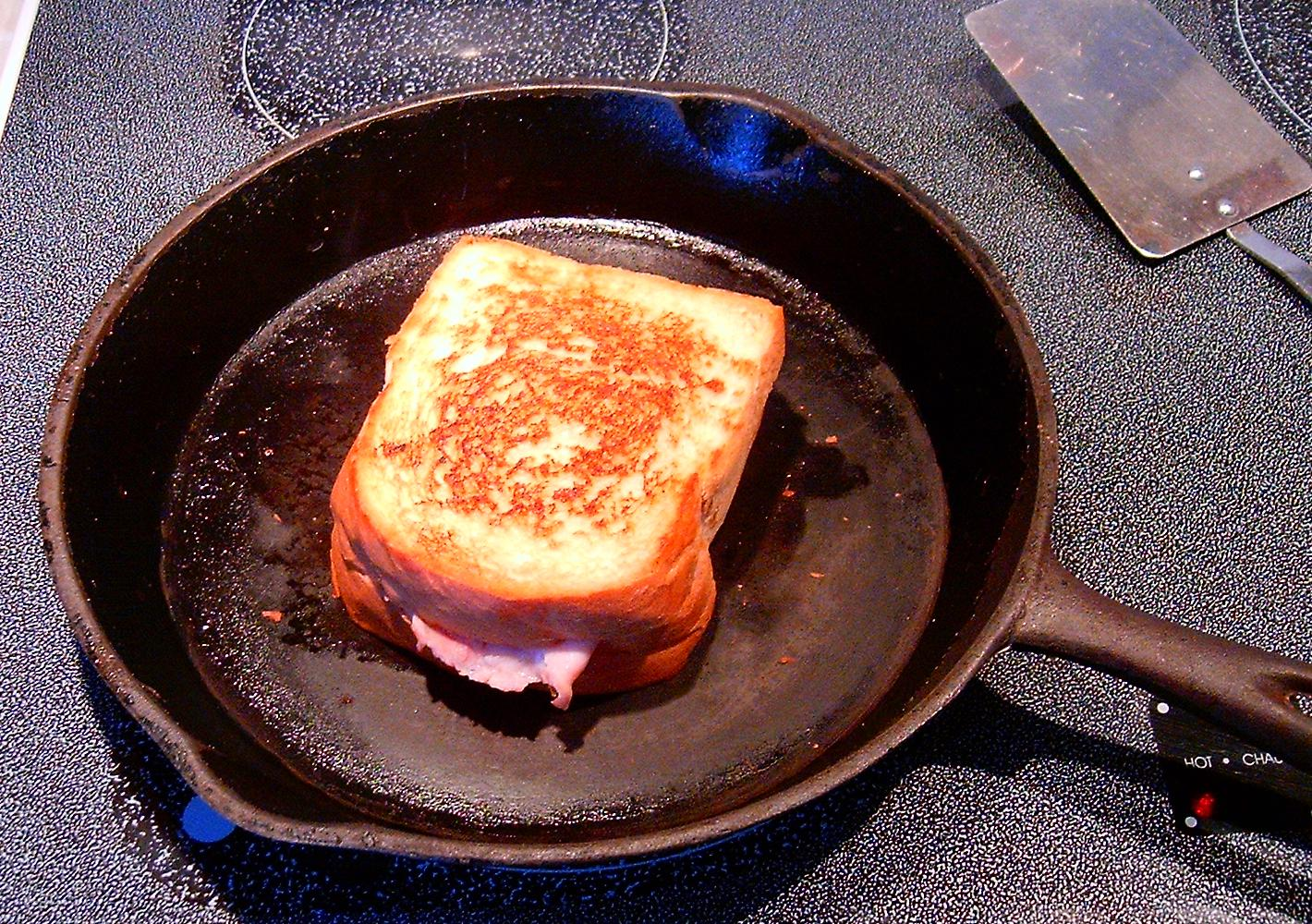
- A grilled ham and cheese sandwich, in a cast-iron frying pan (croque-monsieur style)
- Type: Sandwich
- Main ingredients: Sliced bread, cheese, ham

The ham sandwich is a type of sandwich with ham as a primary ingredient. The bread may be fresh or toasted, and it can be made with a variety of toppings including cheese and vegetables like lettuce, tomato, onion, sliced pickles, or sometimes potato chips. Various kinds of mustard and mayonnaise are also common.

The main components of a ham sandwich—sliced bread and sliced cooked ham—are readily available in Western supermarkets. As a result, they are a common component of packed lunches due to their ease of preparation and consumption.

== Ham and cheese sandwich ==
The origin of the ham and cheese sandwich has been debated for a number of years by culinary intellectuals. The leading theory as to who first started to produce a ham, cheese and bread dish is mentioned in The Larousse Gastronomique 1961. Here it notes that Patrick Connolly, an 18th-century Irish immigrant to England, sold a bread dish which:

combined the remains of pig, cured and sliced with a topping of Leicester cheese and a kiss of egg yolk sauce (a form of mayonnaise) in a round bread roll. The dish was rather unimaginatively known as a Connolly and is still sometimes referred to as this in some parts of the Midlands in the UK.

In the United Kingdom a common addition to a ham and cheese sandwich is pickle (a sweet, vinegary chutney originally by Branston); the snack is then known as a ham, cheese and pickle sandwich.

As recalled by Harry Stevens, a ballpark concessionaire, in a 1924 interview, in 1894 ham and cheese sandwiches were the only food sold in New York baseball parks; frankfurters were introduced in 1909.

An Englishwoman, writing in 1923 of her passage through Ellis Island on a trip to the United States, noted:

I was in fear and trembling, having heard so many tales of the abuse aliens receive there.... The attendants were very kind and not at all rough with us. It was the noon hour... in a little while porters came along with baskets of very good ham and cheese sandwiches and coffee for the grown-ups and milk for the babies.

Richard E. Byrd took ham and cheese sandwiches on his 1926 polar flight, as did the 1927 transatlantic fliers Chamberlin and Levine.

== Consumption ==
The British Sandwich Association says that the ham sandwich is the most popular sandwich in the UK, and a survey they conducted in 2001 saw ham as the second-favourite filling behind cheese. 70% of the 1.8 billion sandwiches eaten in France in 2008 were ham sandwiches, prompting a French economic analysis firm to begin a 'jambon-beurre index', like the Big Mac Index, to compare prices across the country.

The world's longest ham sandwich was created by Nico Jimenez, a butcher in Pamplona, Spain, in 2009.

== Varieties ==
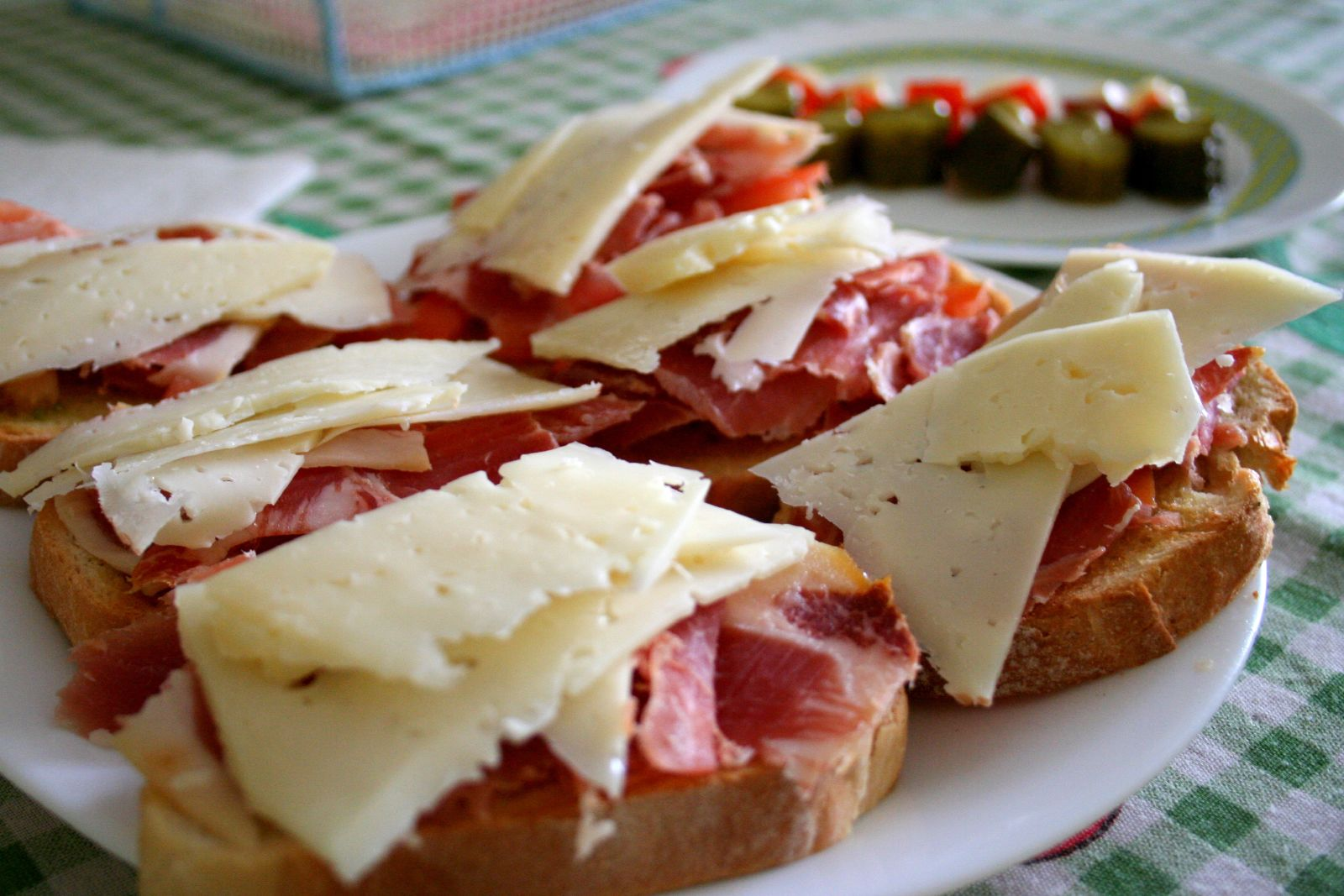
Open-faced ham and cheese tapas-style sandwiches

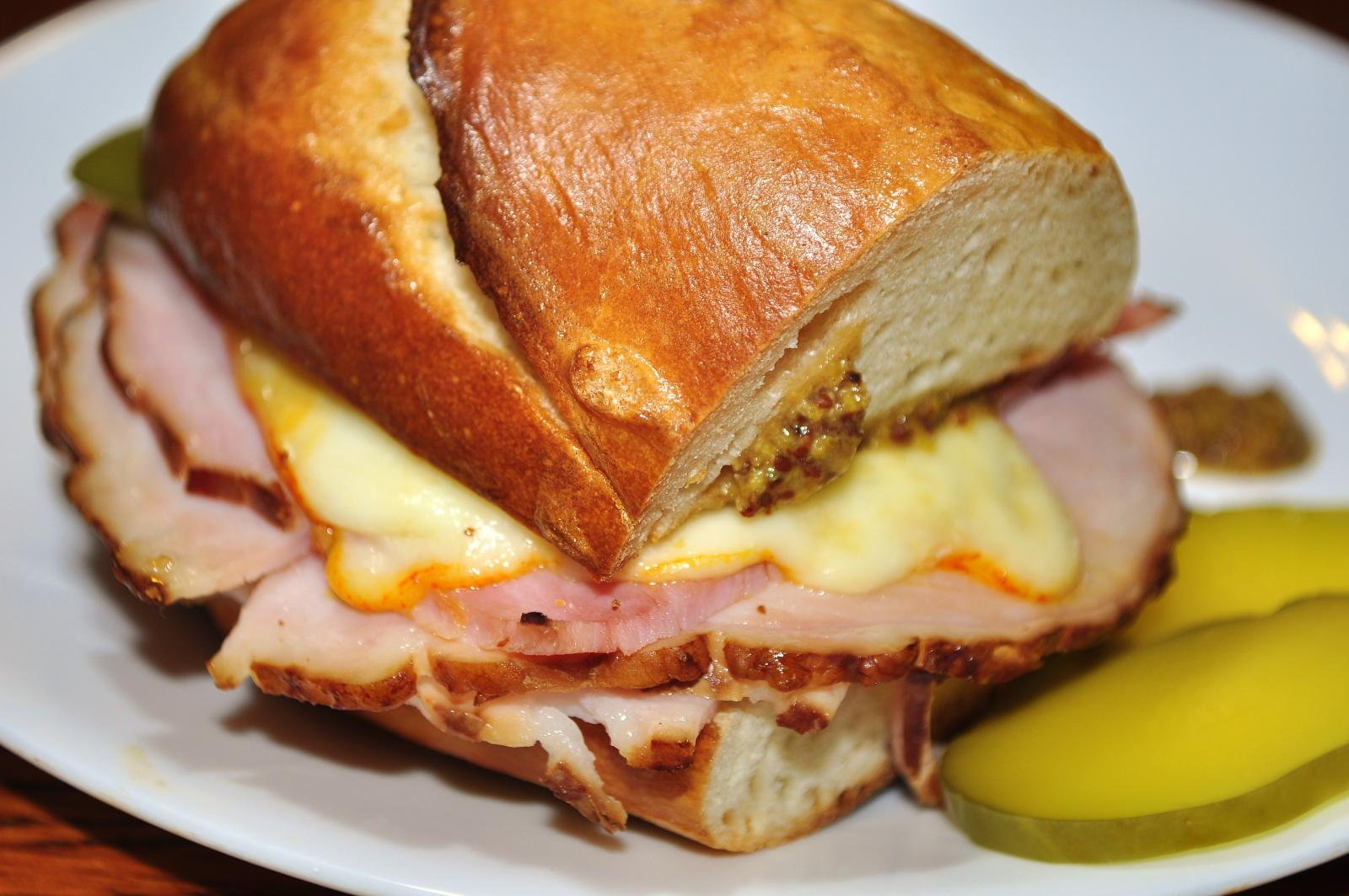
Homemade ham and cheese sandwich

In Argentinian cuisine a fosforito is a ham and cheese sandwich using puff pastry as the bread. In Uruguayan cuisine the same puff pastry sandwich is called a jesuita.

In French cuisine a croque-monsieur is a type of ham and cheese sandwich. It is baked or fried.

In Brazilian cuisine a toasted ham and cheese sandwich is known as a misto-quente (lit. 'hot mix').

The Cuban sandwich is made with ham, cheese, and crusty Cuban bread, often toasted in a panini press. Variations of this sandwich are popular in Cuba, as well as South Florida in the United States.

== Health ==
The World Cancer Research Fund warned in 2009 against parents feeding their children too many ham sandwiches, due to the risk of bowel cancer from the processed meat.

A ham sandwich was suspected of causing an outbreak of swine fever in the UK in 2000.

== In popular culture ==
In the United States, former Chief Judge of New York Sol Wachtler was quoted by Tom Wolfe in The Bonfire of the Vanities as stating that a grand jury would "'indict a ham sandwich', if that's what you wanted."

The name "ham sandwich" is sometimes used (particularly by the New Orleans Police Department) to refer to a firearm planted at a crime scene by police as false evidence.

== See also ==
- Bologna sandwich
- Grilled cheese
- Ham sandwich theorem
- List of ham dishes
- List of sandwiches
- Spam (food)
