= Ham and egg bun =

Hong Kong pastry

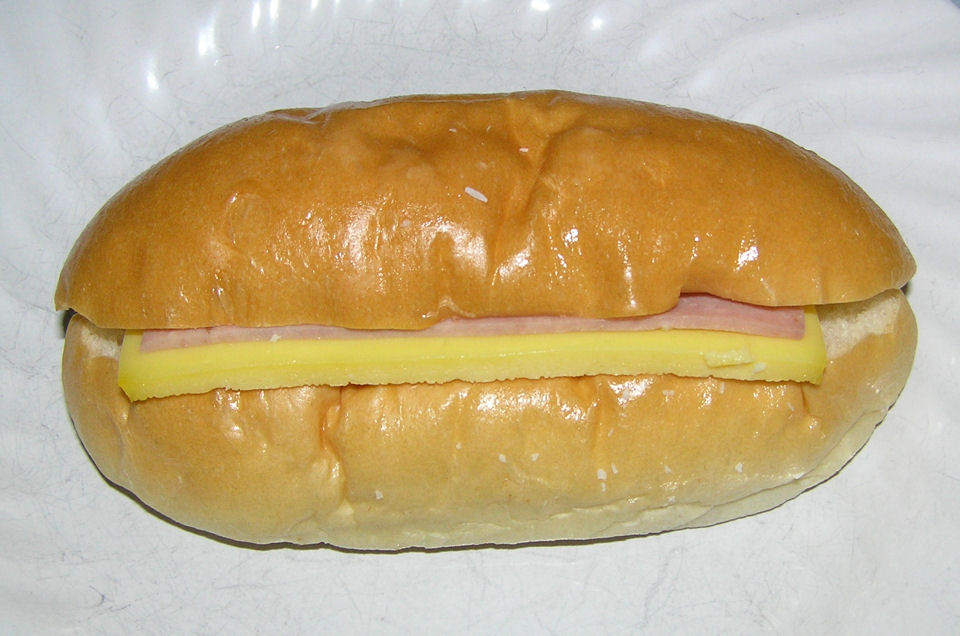
- Type: Pastry
- Region or state: Hong Kong, Brazil, Chicago
- Main ingredients: Flour, eggs, ham

Ham and egg bun
- Traditional Chinese: 火腿雞蛋包
- Simplified Chinese: 火腿鸡蛋包
- Hanyu Pinyin: hǔotǔi jīdàn bāo
- IPA: [xwòtʰwò tɕítân páʊ]
- Jyutping: fo2teoi2 gai1daan6*2 baau1

Ham and egg bun is a type of Hong Kong pastry. It is a bun or bread that contains a sheet of cooked egg and a slice of ham. It is commonly found in Hong Kong as well as some Chinatown bakery shops overseas. It is also a common meal in Brazil, simply called a sandwich.

== See also ==
- Beef bun
- Cuban sandwich
- Bánh mì
- Ham and eggs
- St. Paul sandwich
- List of sandwiches
- List of ham dishes
- List of pork dishes
- List of buns
