= List of sandwiches =

Sandwiches are a common type of prepared food, typically involving sliced bread, and often part of a packed lunch. Spanning a wide range of styles, and assembled from a diverse variety of ingredients, major types of sandwiches include:

- Ingredients between slices of sandwich bread
- Ingredients between a halved baguette or roll
- Hero, hoagie, or submarine sandwich
- Open-faced sandwich
- Pocket sandwich

Dessert foods named by analogy include sandwich cookies and ice cream sandwiches.

== Sandwiches ==
Name	Image	Origin	Description
American sub		United States	Traditionally uses sliced turkey breast, ham, roast beef, American, Swiss or Provolone cheese, chopped or shredded lettuce, tomatoes and green peppers on a roll of bread.
Ayvalık toast		Turkey	Cooked in a sandwich press, it usually contains cheese, sausage, pastirma, or sucuk.
Bacon		United Kingdom	Often eaten with ketchup or brown sauce.
Bacon, egg and cheese			Breakfast sandwich, usually with fried or scrambled egg.
Bagel toast	Bagel toast	Israel	Pressed, toasted bagel filled with vegetables and cheese and grilled on a sandwich toaster or panini press.
Baked bean		United States (Boston area)	Canned baked beans on white or brown bread, sometimes with butter.
Bánh mì		Vietnam	Filling is typically meat, but can contain a wide range of foods, including sardines, tofu, pâté, or eggs. Served on an airy baguette with pickled carrots and daikon radish, cilantro and jalapeño peppers.
Barbecue		United States (Texas, Georgia,Tennessee, North Carolina, Alabama, Kansas, Missouri, Arkansas, Mississippi, Arizona, Utah, Nevada, Colorado & Louisiana)	Served on a bun, with chopped, sliced, or shredded meat (pulled pork, beef, or chicken typically), and sometimes topped with coleslaw.
Barros Jarpa		Chile	Ham and cheese, usually mantecoso, which is similar to farmer cheese.
Barros Luco		Chile	Beef (usually thin-cut steak) and cheese.
Bauru		Brazil	Melted cheese, roast beef, tomato, and pickled cucumber in a hollowed-out French roll.
Beef on weck		United States (Buffalo, New York)	Roast beef on a Kummelweck roll, often topped with horseradish.
Beirute		Brazil	Melted cheese, sliced fresh tomatoes with oregano, lettuce leaves, roast beef on pita bread with mayonnaise.
Bifana		Portugal	Marinated pork cutlet, often served with a special sauce.
BLT		United States	Named for its ingredients: bacon, lettuce, and tomato. Often served on toasted sliced bread spread with mayonnaise.
Bocadillo		Spain	Crisp white bread with a wide variety of fillings. Typical fillings are Spanish omelette, cold meats like jamón, sausages and cheese.
Bokit		France (Guadeloupe)	Guadeloupean bread fried in sunflower oil and filled with fish or meat and vegetables.
Bologna		United States	Sliced and sometimes fried bologna sausage between slices of white bread, with various condiments such as mustard, mayonnaise, ketchup.
Bombay sandwich		India	Popular street food in Mumbai, featuring white bread coated with butter and chutney and filled with potatoes, raw vegetables such as onions and beetroot, spices, chutneys and often shredded processed cheese and sev
Bondiola		Argentina	Sandwich made with thick slices of pork shoulder. The sandwiches are commonly sold by street food vendors and in restaurants in Argentina. The meat consists of slices of roasted or cured pork shoulder and it is usually served on crispy brioche bread. It can be topped with a variety of condiments and vegetables.
Bosna		Austria	Usually grilled on white bread, containing a bratwurst sausage, onions, and a blend of tomato ketchup, mustard, and curry powder.
Bratwurst		Germany	A popular street food in Germany, often served on a roll with mustard in which case it is a sandwich. Some vendors offer a side dish of sauerkraut or french fries.
Breakfast roll		Ireland	Convenience dish on a variety of bread rolls, containing such full breakfast items as sausages, bacon, white or black pudding, mushrooms, tomatoes, hash browns, and fried eggs, often eaten with ketchup or brown sauce. Designed to be eaten on the way to school or work, it can be purchased at a wide variety of petrol stations, local newsagents, supermarkets, and eateries throughout Ireland.
Breakfast		United States	Typically a scrambled or fried egg, cheese, and a sausage patty or other breakfast meat, served on a biscuit or English muffin.
Broodje kroket		The Netherlands	Soft bread roll containing a ragout-based croquette, often eaten with mustard.
Buk e Gjath		Albania	Warm baguette filled with melted kashkaval, sausage, sundried tomatoes and ground walnuts.
Bulkie roll		New England	A New England regional variety of sandwich roll, sandwiches made with bulkie rolls are very common in New England-area delicatessens, restaurants, and institutional food services. Bulkie rolls are larger and firmer than hamburger buns.
Bun kebab		India and Pakistan	Consists of a shallow-fried, spicy patty, onions, and chutney or raita in a hamburger or hot dog bun.
Butifarra		Peru (Lima)	A typical street food sandwich commonly found in Lima, Peru. It is typically prepared using a special preparation of pork, locally called "country ham," with salsa criolla and lettuce inside a French bread or rosette.
Butterbrot		Germany	Single, open-faced, with butter.
Camel rider		United States (Jacksonville, Florida)	Lunch meats and Italian dressings in a pita
Carrozza		Italy	Breaded and fried mozzarella sandwich.
Cemita		Mexico	Sliced avocado, meat, white cheese, onions, and red sauce (salsa roja), on a fluffy sesame-seeded egg roll, originally from the city of Puebla.
Chacarero		Chile	Thinly sliced churrasco-style steak, or lomito-style pork, with tomatoes, green beans, and green chiles, served on a round roll.
Cheese		Global	Made with one or more varieties of cheese, often with other ingredients, such as butter or mayonnaise. When toasted (pictured), it is commonly referred to as a grilled cheese sandwich.
Cheese dream		United States	Open-faced grilled cheese sandwich, often with other ingredients.
Cheese and pickle		United Kingdom	Slices of cheese (typically Cheddar) and pickle (a sweet, vinegary chutney with the most popular brand being Branston), sandwiched between two slices of bread.
Cheesesteak		Pennsylvania/United States (Philadelphia, Pennsylvania)	Thinly sliced steak and melted cheese in a hoagie roll, with additional toppings often including peppers, onions, and mushrooms, also known as a Philadelphia or Philly cheesesteak. Variations include the Phillies' official cheesesteak, The Heater.
Chicken		Global	Chicken sandwich can contain chicken cooked in a variety of ways. In the United States, common forms of chicken sandwiches include the grilled chicken breast sandwich, the fried chicken breast sandwich, the chicken salad sandwich, and the shredded (or barbeque) chicken sandwich.
Chicken fillet roll		Ireland	A bread roll filled with a fillet of processed chicken. It is a ubiquitous deli item in Ireland, served hot.
Chicken salad		Global	Sandwich prepared with chicken salad as a filling.
Chicken schnitzel		Australia, New Zealand and Austria	Sandwich of crumbed, pan-fried chicken fillet, on buttered bread, with shredded iceberg lettuce and mayonnaise. An adaptation of the Austrian or Viennese schnitzel sandwich, which consists of crumbed pork, veal or chicken schnitzel on a Semmel or kaiser roll with mayonnaise or mustard and shredded lettuce. See also Cutlet sandwich, Italian.
Chili burger		United States	Hamburger, with the patty topped with chili con carne.
Chimichurris		Dominican Republic	Ground beef, chicken, or pork leg served on pan de agua and garnished with cabbage and salsa rosa.
Chip butty		United Kingdom	Sliced white bread (or a large, flat bread roll) filled with chips, usually sprinkled with salt and vinegar, curry sauce, gravy or tomato ketchup.
Chipped beef		United States (Mid-Atlantic region and military cuisine)	Sandwich prepared with thinly sliced or pressed salted and dried beef. Some chipped beef is smoked to add flavor.
Chivito		Uruguay	Filet mignon with mozzarella, tomatoes, mayonnaise, and commonly bacon, black or green olives, fried or hardboiled eggs, and ham
Chlebíček	.	Czech Republic and Slovakia	Small, open sandwiches, usually served as snacks. Made with a variety of toppings.
Chopped cheese		United States (New York, New York)	Made on a grill with ground beef, onions, and topped by melted cheese and served with lettuce, tomatoes, and condiments on a hero roll.
Choripán		South America, Argentina	Grilled chorizo, usually served on a crusty roll with salsa-type condiments, such as pebre, salsa criolla, or chimichurri. Morcipán is a variety of this using black pudding or blood sausage.
Chow mein sandwich		United States (Massachusetts)	Gravy-based chow mein mixture placed on a hamburger bun, served hot
Churrasco		Chile	Thinly cut steak, grilled and served on a toasted bun. It can be served with almost any other ingredient, in which case its name changes to "churrasco+the new ingredient" (e.g.: churrasco palta = churrasco and avocado).
Club		United States	Double-decker sandwich made with sliced turkey or chicken, bacon, tomato, and lettuce; usually contains mayonnaise.
Conti Roll		Perth, Western Australia	a generous bread roll, a variety of deli meats & cheeses and then preserved vegetables, alongside other Mediterranean ingredients
Corned beef		United States (New York, New York)	Corned beef often served with a condiment such as pickle or mustard.
Coronation chicken		United Kingdom (England)	Chicken meat, seasoned with parsley, thyme, bay leaf, cumin, turmeric, ginger and peppercorns, mixed with cream or mayonnaise, and dried apricots or sultanas.
Crisp		Ireland; United Kingdom	Crisps and occasionally pickles on white bread.
Croque-monsieur		France	Baked or fried ham and cheese (typically Emmental or Gruyère) brioche-sandwich, sometimes coated in a mornay or béchamel sauce.
Croque-madame		France	Same as a croque-monsieur, but with a fried egg on top.
Cuban		United States (Tampa or Key West, Florida)	Ham, roasted pork, Swiss cheese, pickles, mustard, and sometimes Genoa salami on Cuban bread, sometimes pressed and warmed in a plancha.
Cucumber		United Kingdom	Two thin slices of crustless, lightly buttered white bread, containing paper-thin slices of peeled cucumber. Often as a tea sandwich.
Cudighi		United States	Spicy cudighi (a Michigan variety of Cotechino Italian sausage), on a long, hard roll, often topped with mozzarella and tomato sauce
Dagwood		United States	Multiple layers containing a wide variety of meats and condiments, named for Dagwood Bumstead of the comic strip Blondie.
Deli		Germany, United States, United Kingdom	Sandwich usually ordered at a deli; choices include type of bread (toasted or untoasted,) type of meat (cold cut), type of sliced cheese, vegetable fillings (lettuce, tomato, onion, etc.), and condiments.
Denver		United States	Sandwich containing a Denver omelette.
Donair		Canada, Halifax	A variant of the Döner kebab, made with beef cooked on a vertical spit. This is served wrapped in a pita with onions, tomatoes and a unique donair sauce made with sweetened condensed milk, vinegar, and garlic powder.
Döner kebab		Turkey	Döner kebab is meat cooked on a vertical spit, normally veal or beef but also may be a mixture of these with lamb, and sometimes chicken. This may be served wrapped in a flatbread such as lavash or pita, or as a sandwich.
Donkey burger		China	Chopped or shredded savory donkey meat in a bun, sold in Baoding, Hebei Province as street food, and also in high-end restaurants.
Doubles		Trinidad and Tobago	Two flat fried bara (bread), containing curried chickpeas or garbanzo beans.
Doughnut sandwich		United States	A sandwich made with a doughnut instead of bread (can be made with fried chicken, bacon, ham, sausage, cheese, etc.)
Dyrlægens natmad		Denmark	Made with a piece of dark rye bread, a layer of leverpostej, topped with a slice of salt beef and a slice of meat aspic, topped with raw onion rings and garden cress.
Egg		Global	A sandwich that contains eggs as the main component, usually sliced or chopped hard boiled eggs or egg salad. It can be mixed with mayonnaise, and seasoned with salt and black pepper; or with a mild curry powder in an Australian curried egg sandwich. Other versions may be made with fried or (more rarely) scrambled egg, topped with the local roe spread, locally called kaviar.; Eggs Benedict is an open-faced sandwich consisting of an English muffin topped with meat, eggs, and hollandaise sauce.; Egg spread: Polish version of egg salad, similar to a Japanese egg salad sandwich, most of the time with addition of garlic and Polish pickled cucumbers mixed in.
Elvis		United States	Peanut butter, banana, and bacon.
Falafel		Middle East	Deep-fried balls of ground, seasoned chickpeas topped with salad vegetables, hot sauce, tahini-based sauces, and pickled vegetables, wrapped in or added to the pocket of a split-open pita bread.
Fischbrötchen		Germany; Belgium; Netherlands; Switzerland	Crusty bread rolls filled with fish (most commonly Bismarck or soused herring) and onions.
Fishcake butty		United Kingdom (Northern England)	Commonly served in fish and chip shops, especially in the North of England. It consists of a fish cake (either the scollop/"Yorkshire" style made with a piece of fish fillet sandwiched between thick slices of potato, battered and fried; or with the rissole type of fishcake made with mashed potato mixed with flakes of fish and battered and fried) served in a soft white bread roll. Some fish and chip shops may offer both types. The fish used for both types is a white fish, often haddock.
Fish finger		United Kingdom	A common British comfort food.
Fluffernutter		United States (Massachusetts)	Peanut butter and marshmallow creme.
Fool's Gold Loaf		United States (Colorado)	Consists of a single warmed, hollowed-out loaf of bread filled with one jar of creamy peanut butter, one jar of grape jelly, and a pound of bacon. In 1976, Elvis Presley and some of his friends flew to Colorado to consume them.
Francesinha		Portugal	Wet-cured ham, linguiça, fresh sausage, steak or other roast meat, topped with melted cheese, a hot thick tomato and beer sauce.
Francesinha poveira		Portugal	Bun with wet-cured ham, linguiça, and cheese, sauced with butter or margarine, piri-piri, and port wine, whiskey, cognac, or brandy.
French dip		United States (Los Angeles, California)	Thinly sliced roast beef on a baguette, served hot, usually au jus (with juice).
Fricasse		Tunisia	A deep-fried pastry cut in half and filled with tuna, hard boiled egg, olives, harissa, preserved lemons, capers and mashed potato, with turmeric as a condiment.
Fried brain		United States	Sliced pork or calves' brain, battered and deep-fried, on rye bread or hamburger bun, often served with pickles, raw onion, and mustard.
Gatsby		South Africa	Deli-style sandwich similar to the hoagie, often containing French fries, with other variations, prepared with masala steak, chicken, polony, Vienna sausages, calamari, fish, or chargrilled steak.
Gerber		United States (St. Louis, Missouri)	Half section of Italian or French bread with garlic butter, containing ham and Provel cheese, topped with paprika, then toasted.
Gilgeori toast		South Korea	Korean street toasted sandwich with omelet, ham, shredded cabbage and other vegetables, with a topping of sugar, ketchup, mayonnaise and mustard.
Glasgow Oyster		United Kingdom (Scotland)	A scotch pie on a morning roll
Grilled cheese			A slice of bread grilled with melty cheese.
Gua bao		China	Fujianese sandwich consisting of a slice of stewed meat and other condiments sandwiched between flat steamed bread.
Guajolota		Mexico (Mexico City)	Tamale in a Mexican bolillo roll. A very common morning street food in Mexico City. It is also called torta de tamal.
Gyros		Greece; Cyprus	"Pita gyros" or "psomaki gyros", depending on the type of bread used, includes meat roasted on a vertical spit, with tomato, fried potatoes, onion and tzatziki sauce or yoghourt wrapped in pita or sandwich bread.
Hagelslag or vlokken		The Netherlands	Chocolate sprinkles or flakes usually served on buttered bread.
Ham		Global (such as France, United States, United Kingdom)	May be accompanied by cheese or salad. Condiments such as mustard, mayonnaise, or pickle may be present.
Ham and cheese		United States; Global	Common sandwich prepared with ham and sliced cheese. Additional ingredients may include lettuce, tomato, mayonnaise, and other ingredients.
Ham and egg bun		Hong Kong	Sliced Danish canned ham with sliced scrambled egg sheet in a halved sweet bun.
Hamburger		United States	Ground beef patty, often with vegetables, sauces and other meats, usually on a round bun. A cheeseburger is also topped with cheese.
Hamdog		Australia	Hot dog wrapped in a beef patty, deep-fried, then covered with chili, a few french fries, and a fried egg.
Handwich		United States (Walt Disney World, Florida)	A cone-shaped piece of bread with a filling, intended to be held and eaten with one hand. Similar to an ice cream cone or a bread bowl.
Hani		United States (Detroit, Michigan)	Chopped fried chicken wrapped with lettuce, tomatoes, and cheese in a pita spread with mayonnaise
Har cheong gai burger		Singapore	Har cheong gai (chicken fried with fermented shrimp paste) in a sesame seed bun with salad and mayonnaise.
Horseshoe		United States (Springfield, Illinois)	Thick-sliced, toasted, open-faced sandwich, it usually contains hamburger patties or ham, but other meat, such as deep-fried pork tenderloin, grilled or fried chicken breast, and fried fish fillets, can be used. The meat is topped with French fries and covered with a cheese sauce.
Hot brown		United States (Louisville, Kentucky)	Open-faced with turkey and bacon, topped with mornay sauce, and baked or broiled. Variation of Welsh rarebit. A similar dish in St. Louis, also sometimes called a "hot brown," is known as a prosperity sandwich.
Hot chicken		Canada, (Quebec)	A closed-faced shredded chicken sandwich, topped with galvaude, a sauce consisting of gravy and green peas. The gravy and chicken are served hot while the bread is untoasted but often buttered. Eaten with a knife and fork.
Hot dog		United States	A hot dog is a food consisting of a grilled or steamed sausage served in the slit of a partially sliced bun. It can also refer to the sausage itself. The sausage used is a wiener or a frankfurter.
Indian taco		United States	Seasoned beef or beans topped with lettuce, diced tomatoes, cheese, and other condiments on Indigenous frybread, often folded.
Italian		United States	Prepared on a long bread roll or bun with meats such as salami, mortadella and capicolla along with cheese, tomato, olive oil, salt and black pepper.
Italian beef		Italy; United States (Chicago, Illinois)	Thin slices of seasoned, juicy roast beef, often garnished with giardiniera or Italian sweet peppers, on a dense, long Italian-style roll.
Jam		United Kingdom	Buttered bread, with fruit jam/conserve, normally eaten at lunchtime or as a quick snack, may also be eaten at breakfast or for tea.
Jambon-beurre		France	French baguette with butter and ham. Also known as "Parisien," it is the most popular sandwich in France.
Jesuita		Argentina	Ham and cheese sandwiched between two pieces of puff pastry and brushed with a sweet glaze
Jibarito		United States (Chicago, Illinois)	Meat, cheese, lettuce, and tomato, between flattened, fried green plantains (instead of bread), with garlic-flavored mayonnaise.
Jucy Lucy		United States (Minneapolis, Minnesota)	Cheeseburger with the cheese inside the meat patty rather than on top.
Kabuli burger		Peshawar, Pakistan and Afghanistan	A flat bread wrap with chips and sausage seasoned with salt, chili powder and curry sauce or ketchup.
Kaisers Jagdproviant		Austria	Finger sandwich with ham, pickles, eggs and cheese.
Katsu sando		Japan	Breaded, deep-fried pork cutlet (tonkatsu).
Khao Jee Pâté		Laos	Similar to Vietnam's bánh mì, it is a street food prepared using pork liver pâté, stuffed with pork or Lao sausage, sliced papaya, carrots, shallots or onion, cucumber, cilantro and sometimes Jeow bong or chili sauce.
Kokoretsi		Anatolia and Balkans and especially Greece	Lamb or goat intestines, containing seasoned offal.
Kottenbutter		Germany	Buttered brown bread with smoked pork sausage (Kottenwurst), fresh onion rings, and spicy mustard.
Kumru		Turkey	Turkish sandwich featuring pre-griddled cheese on a special bun enriched with chickpea flour. Kumru translates to "turtledove" in Turkish.
Lampredotto		Italy	Sandwich with a slow-cooked cattle abomasum.
Leberkäse		Austria, Switzerland and southern Germany	Meatloaf-like dish which, despite the name, may contain neither liver nor cheese. It is commonly served on a Kaiser roll with mustard or mayonnaise.
Limburger		United States; Russia	They are typically prepared with buttered rye bread, Limburger cheese, sliced onion and mustard. Pictured is Limburger cheese and bread.
Lobster roll		United States (United States Northeast), Canada (Canada Maritime provinces)	Lobster meat tossed with either mayonnaise ("cold") or drawn butter ("hot") stuffed into a slit opening at the top of a grilled bread roll or hot dog bun.
Lox		United States	Lox on a bagel with cream cheese, thinly sliced onion, capers, and sometimes sliced tomato.
Luther burger		United States	Hamburger or cheeseburger on glazed doughnuts instead of a bun.
Marmalade		United Kingdom	White bread, butter and orange marmalade, popularized by the Paddington books by Michael Bond.
Marmite		United Kingdom	Marmite spread thinly with butter or margarine onto toast or bread. Sometimes combined with cheddar cheese.
Meatball		United States	Meatballs in marinara sauce, with melted Parmesan or provolone cheese, on a long bun or section of Italian loaf. Might include Italian-style accompaniments such as bell peppers, basil, or Italian-dressed lettuce.
Medianoche		Cuba	Roast pork, ham, mustard, Swiss cheese, and dill pickles served on sweet bread.
Melt		United States	Generic sandwich containing a filling and a layer of cheese, grilled or fried until the cheese is melted.
Mettbrötchen		Germany	Open sandwich consisting of a sliced bun, topped with Mett (seasoned minced raw pork without bacon), frequently with a garnish of raw onion rings or diced raw onion.
Mitraillette		Belgium	French fries and fried meat with sauce on a demi-baguette.
Mollete		Mexico	Open sandwich consisting of a bolillo roll topped with refried beans, cheese and peppers, and grilled.
Montadito		Spain & Portugal	A small version of the Serranito. A warm sandwich, usually grilled and served on a bread roll such as viena andaluza (a type of long roll) or a mollete (A type of round bread). Typically containing grilled meat (chicken or pork loin), cured ham, fried green pepper and sliced tomato, but may contain a variety of fillings. Some bars offer a variety of 200 different types of these sandwiches.
Monte Cristo		United States; Switzerland; France	Sliced ham and cheese (usually Emmental or Gruyère) between slices of French toast and batter-fried. In some regions it is sprinkled with powdered sugar and served with jelly or jam. In other regions (New England), it is served savory with French mustard and no powdered sugar.
Montreal-style smoked meat		Canada, Quebec	Sandwich made from cured and smoked brisket with yellow mustard, usually on rye bread.
Mortadella		Brazil	Brazilian sandwich containing mortadella that is popular in the city of São Paulo.
Mother-in-law		United States	Hot dog bun containing a Chicago-style corn-roll tamale, topped with chili.
Muffuletta		United States (New Orleans, Louisiana)	The name of the sandwich refers to the type of bread used. Originated in New Orleans' Italian-American community, this contains meats, cheeses, and olive salad on a round bun.
Naan		India, Pakistan & Bangladesh	Vegetables or beef on naan bread.
Num pang	Num Pang Cambodian Sandwich Pork Belly, grilled corn, pickles	Cambodia	A short baguette with thin, crisp crust and soft, airy texture often split lengthwise and filled with savory ingredients.
Nutritious sandwich		Taiwan	Taiwanese street food originating from Keelung. It features a golden, deep-fried oval bun resembling a submarine sandwich, filled with chilled salad ingredients such as ham, tomatoes, cucumber, and marinated eggs.
Obložené chlebíčky		Czech Republic	Type of open sandwich served as an appetizer or snack.
Open-faced		Nordic (such as Sweden, Finland, Norway, Denmark, Iceland & Estonia), United States, United Kingdom	Consists of a single slice of bread with one or more food items on top.
Pambazo		Mexico	Made with pambazo bread dipped in a red guajillo pepper sauce and filled with potatoes and chorizo.
Pan-bagnat		France	Round bread (bread bagnats) topped with green salad, tomatoes, hard-boiled eggs, tuna, anchovies, cucumbers, fava beans, artichokes, green peppers, radishes, onions, basil, and black olives. Condiments may include garlic, vinegar, olive oil, salt, and pepper. Served chilled.
Panini		Italy	In Italy, panino is the word for a sandwich made from bread other than sliced bread, in which case Italians call it a tramezzino. Examples of bread types used are ciabatta, rosetta and baguette. The bread is cut horizontally and filled with deli ingredients such as salami, ham, cheese, mortadella, or other food, and is sometimes pressed by a warming grill. In the United States, United Kingdom, and Canada, the term panini is used to refer to a long pressed and toasted sandwich; there is widespread availability and use of sandwich presses, often known as "panini presses."
Panuozzo		Italy	Panuozzo (Italian: [panu-oˈdzːzo][3]; (plural form): panuozzi; Neapolitan: o panozzo, large panino) is an Italian sandwich of pizza bread stuffed with fillings of meat and vegetables. It was invented in 1983 by pizza chef (pizzaiolo) Giuseppe Mascolo from Gragnano near Naples, Italy.
Pastrami on rye		United States (New York, New York)	A sandwich made famous in the Jewish kosher delicatessens of New York City.
Pasty barm		United Kingdom (Northern England)	A meat and potato pasty in a buttered barm cake, particularly popular in Bolton.
Pattie butty		United Kingdom (Northern England)	Consists of a pattie made from mashed potato flavoured with sage, battered and fried, in a soft white bread roll. They are sold in fish and chip shops in Kingston upon Hull and surrounding areas.
Patty melt		United States	Consists of a hamburger patty, pieces of sautéed or grilled onion, and Cheddar or Swiss cheese between two slices of bread.
Peameal bacon sandwich		Canada (Ontario)	Peameal bacon, a type of back bacon, inside a kaiser roll. Also known as back bacon on a bun.
Peanut butter and jelly		United States	Jam is often used in place of jelly. Also known as a PB&J. PB&J may also be served with fresh fruit rather than jam, with thin sliced apples, pears, or bananas.
Peanut butter and pickle		United States	Also known as a PB&P.
Pebete		Argentina	Simple Argentine sandwich, traditionally filled with cheese, cured meat, tomato, and mayonnaise. Pebete actually refers to the bread used for the sandwich - a soft oval bun with a spongy inside, and a thin toasted crust.
Pepito		Spain	Steak sandwich that is also common in Mexico and Venezuela. In Spain, it usually also contains aioli.
Pimento cheese		United States	Common food preparation in the Southern United States, a spread or relish made with cheese, mayonnaise, pimentos, salt and pepper, blended to either a smooth or chunky paste. Regional variations incorporate additional ingredients. Also eaten in the United Kingdom (see "Tea" in this list) and the Philippines.
Pistolette		United States (Louisiana Creole)	Stuffed and fried bread roll (sometimes called stuffed pistolettes) in the Cajun areas around Lafayette. This also refers to a type of submarine-shaped bread about half the size of a baguette that is popular in New Orleans for Vietnamese bánh mì and other sandwiches.
Pit beef		United States (Baltimore, Maryland)	Typically served on a kaiser roll. Popular toppings include onions and tiger sauce (mayonnaise + horseradish).
Pljeskavica		Balkans	Patty dish popular in the Balkan region of Southeastern Europe, a sandwich utilizes the Pljeskavica patty and bread.
Po' boy		United States (New Orleans, Louisiana)	Crusty long roll split and filled with cold cuts, roasted beef or fried seafood. The New Orleans analogue to the sub or hoagie.
Polish boy		United States (Cleveland, Ohio)	Kielbasa sausage in a bun, covered with french fries, barbecue sauce (or hot sauce), and coleslaw.
Porchetta		Italy	A sandwich made of roast pork with Italian-type spices such as rosemary, garlic, fennel and others in varying proportions. It is popular as street food (usually sold from white trucks) throughout central Italy. It was transplanted to America in the late 19th century by Italian immigrants and is known as the "roast" pork sandwich, very popular in the northeastern United States. In America it is often served with provolone cheese and "greens" which may be spinach or broccoli raab.
Porilainen		Finland	Half-inch slice of thick sausage, usually with diced red or sweet onion, sliced pickles, ketchup, mustard, and sometimes mayonnaise, on white bread.
Pork chop bun		Macau	Popular dish in Macau, the bun is extremely crisp outside and very soft inside, containing a freshly fried pork chop.
Pork roll		United States (New Jersey)	Pork roll still is the predominant term in South Jersey, but in the northern part of the state it is "Taylor ham". It is grilled pork roll served several ways. This can be served with a fried egg, or a fried egg with cheese. Variations include serving with grilled pork roll and cheese or just grilled pork roll. Although classically served on a kaiser roll, bread variations include bagels, English muffins, or other breads.
Pork tenderloin		United States (Midwest)	Thin, tenderized, deep-fried pork loin, typically served on an undersized bun.
Prawn roll		Australia	Cooked shrimp in a small sandwich roll, dressed with remoulade, Thousand Island dressing or cocktail sauce, sometimes garnished with boiled egg slices and lettuce.
Primanti		United States (Pittsburgh, Pennsylvania)	Selection of grilled meats topped with french fries, coleslaw, and tomato on Italian bread.
Princess		Bulgaria	Open-faced toasted sandwich, usually topped with minced meat (mixed with egg and spices) and kashkaval, though the term could also refer to a vegetarian version topped with a mixture of kashkaval, sirene and egg. Could be seasoned with ketchup, mayonnaise or chubritsa or sharena sol. A regional term for a princess sandwich with minced meat is strandzhanka.
Pulled pork		Southern United States	Barbecue sandwich in which pork (usually shoulder) is smoked slowly at a low temperature until the meat becomes tender enough that it can be "pulled" or shredded with two forks. The pork is served on a bun and often topped with barbecue sauce and vinegar- or mayonnaise-based coleslaw depending on the region.
Reuben		United States (Omaha, Nebraska or New York, New York)	Corned beef, sauerkraut, Swiss cheese, topped with Russian or Thousand Island dressing, on rye bread, then grilled. Creamy coleslaw replaces the sauerkraut in some places.
Roast beef		Global	Sliced roast beef or sometimes beef loaf on bread. A variant of this sandwich is the roast beef special (deli sandwich) which is sliced roast beef, thousand island salad dressing and cole slaw served, generally, on rye bread.
Roti bakar		Indonesia	Toasted white bread with a filling such as butter, jam, chocolate spread, cheese, or other (generally sweet) fillings. Also known as roti panggang.
Roti john		Southeast Asia; Malaysia	Basic ingredients are eggs, chopped onions, sambal paste, salt, and pepper, cooked as an omelette with the bread added on top before it's fully cooked. Many variations include canned sardines, chicken, beef, or mutton. Garnished with mayo, chili sauce, and cheese.
Rou jia mo		China	Stewed pork, chopped finely, and stuffed in mo, a kind of flatbread.
Ruisleipä		Finland	Sandwich made of traditional Finnish dark rye, buttered, with lettuce, hard-boiled egg, pickles, tomato, and choice of cheese and meat (typically pork). Known colloquially as "The Winning Combination."
Runza		United States	Bun filled with a mixture of (usually) loose meat, cabbage, and cheese. The fillings are baked inside the bread, similar to a kolache. Popular in the Midwestern United States, especially Nebraska.
Sabich		Israel	Pita stuffed with fried aubergine, sliced hard boiled egg, tahini sauce and Israeli salad, among other ingredients.
Sailor		United States (Richmond, Virginia)	Hot pastrami, grilled knockwurst, melted Swiss and hot mustard on rye bread.
Salad Sandwich		Australia	Sliced bread, butter or margarine and layers of shredded lettuce or alfalfa sprouts, shredded carrots, sliced or shredded cucumbers, and canned red beetroot.
Salt beef bagel		United Kingdom	Corned beef served in a bagel, sometimes with English mustard and pickles.
Sándwich de milanesa		Southern Cone (Argentina & Uruguay)	Type of sandwich eaten in Argentina and Uruguay. Mainly a large schnitzel with lettuce and sliced tomato, sometimes with added sliced boiled egg, and mayonnaise. Usually but not exclusively the bread is a white baton or a short baguette type of bread. Pictured is a sándwich de milanesa from Tucumán.
Sandwich loaf		United States	Alternating layers of bread and filling frosted to resemble a layer cake.
Sandwiches de miga		Argentina	Made with single-, double-, or triple-layered, buttered, very thin white bread with crust removed, toasted or un-toasted, containing thinly sliced meat, as well as eggs, cheese, tomatoes, green peppers, lettuce, olives, and sometimes other vegetables. Similar to the British finger sandwiches for afternoon tea, but the bread layers are thinner.
Sealed crustless		United States	The filling in this sandwich is sealed between two layers of bread by a crimped edge and has the crust subsequently removed. A popular variety in the United States is peanut butter and jelly. This type of sandwich is mass-produced by The J. M. Smucker Company under the brand name "Uncrustables".
Shawarma		The Levant; Arab world Middle East	Flatbread with meat (traditionally lamb) cooked on a vertical spit. Additional fillings include vegetables such as tomato, cucumbers, onions, and pickles, and a sauce, often yogurt- or tahini-based.
Shooter's sandwich		United Kingdom	Prepared by filling a hollowed-out long loaf of bread with cooked filet mignon steak, cooked mushrooms, salt and pepper.
Slider		United States	A miniature hamburger about three inches in diameter, but may also contain other toppings.
Sloppy joe		United States	Ground meat, usually beef, cooked with seasoned tomato sauce and served on a round bun.
Sloppy joe (New Jersey)		United States	Double-decker rye bread sandwich made with one or more types of sliced deli meat, such as turkey, ham, pastrami, corned beef, roast beef, or sliced beef tongue, along with Swiss cheese, coleslaw, and Russian dressing.
Smörgåstårta		Sweden	Multiple layers of white or light rye bread containing creamy fillings, such as egg and mayonnaise, liver paté, olives, shrimp, ham, various cold cuts, caviar, tomato, cucumber, cheese, and smoked salmon.
Smørrebrød		Denmark	Open-faced, buttered dark rye bread with cold cuts, pieces of meat or fish, cheese, or spreads.
Sol over Gudhjem		Denmark	Open-faced sandwich on rugbrød, with smoked herring, chives, and a raw egg yolk.
Souvlaki		Greece	Sizzling skewer of pork, or chicken roasted, shaved off the spit, and marinade ranging from hot barbecue to sweet, all laid out on a rolled pita bread, sprinkled with the choice of lettuce, tomato, cheese, red onion, and oregano, and doused with tzatziki sauce.
Spaghetti		Australia	Prepared with cooked spaghetti, sauce and bread.
Spatlo		South Africa	A hollowed out quarter loaf of bread, filled with a variety of ingredients such as chips, cheese, polony and atchar. The sandwich is also known as a kota.
Spiced ham		United States (Chicago, Illinois)	Spiced ham, mozzarella cheese slices, and Miracle Whip served between slices of rye bread.
Spiedie		United States (Binghamton, New York)	Marinated cubes of chicken, pork, lamb, veal, venison, or beef, grilled on a spit, and served in a bun.
Steak sandwich		United States	Thinly-sliced or shaved steak or thinly-slice roast beef served on bread or a roll. Variations include toppings such as cheese, onions, mushrooms, bell peppers, hot peppers, tomatoes, and in some instances fried eggs, cole slaw, or french fries. Some variations are served with a dipping sauce.
Steak sandwich (Australia)		Australia	A piece of steak on a bun or between slices of bread
Steak bomb		United States	Grilled, over-stuffed submarine roll, containing shaved steak, and topped with salami, melted provolone, sautéed onions, and bell peppers.
Steak burger		United States, Australia, New Zealand	Typically prepared with ground, sliced or minced beefsteak meat. Additional meats are also used.
St. Paul		United States (St. Louis, Missouri)	Egg foo young patty (containing bean sprouts and minced white onions), dill pickle slices, white onion, mayonnaise, lettuce, and tomato on white bread.
Submarine/Sub/Baguette		Global	Generic sandwich served on a long French or Italian roll which may contain a wide variety of sliced meats, vegetables, and condiments, including lettuce, tomato, sweet peppers, onions, olives, and mushrooms. Also known regionally as a hero, a hoagie, a grinder, or a zep, among other names.
Tavern		United States	Common in Iowa, consists of a mixture of unseasoned ground beef and sauteed onions, sometimes topped with pickles, ketchup, and mustard, on a bun.
Tea		United Kingdom	Thinly sliced white bread lightly buttered, containing a range of fillings such as cucumber, roast beef and horseradish, tuna mayonnaise, cheese and chutney, coronation chicken, ham with mustard, smoked salmon, and egg salad.
Thanksgiving sandwich		United States	Roast turkey, cranberries or cranberry sauce and cheddar cheese.
Toast		United Kingdom	Thin slice of toast between two thin slices of bread with a layer of butter, and salt and pepper to taste.
Toast Hawaii		Germany	Slice of toast with ham, a maraschino cherry in the middle of a pineapple slice, and cheese, grilled from above, so the cheese starts to melt.
Toastie		United Kingdom, United States	Two slices of bread with various fillings, toasted and edges sealed with a sandwich toaster.
Tofu		United States	Tofu, typically broiled or baked, with vegetables.
Tongue toast		United States	Sautéed beef tongue and scrambled eggs, served open-faced
Torta		Mexico	Mexican roll (either telera or bolillo) spread with mayo or refried beans and stuffed with various sliced meats, cheeses, vegetables (usually tomatoes, onions and avocado) and choice of pickled jalapeños or chipotle peppers. It can either be made ahead and tightly wrapped for a packed lunch or (if made to order) grilled on both sides with some butter.
Torta ahogada		Mexico (Guadalajara)	Birote bread (similar to bolillo) filled with carnitas (deep-fried pork), shredded chicken or other meats, beans and cheese. The torta is then dipped in a very hot tomato and dried chile de árbol sauce and topped with pickled sliced onions.
Tramezzino		Italy	Triangular white bread with the crusts removed, with fillings such as tuna and olive and prosciutto, served in Italian bars throughout the day.
Trancapecho		Bolivia	Slice of breaded meat, fried potatoes, a fried egg, rice, and salad (tomatoes, onions, and locotos) between two slices of bread.
Tuna		Global	Usually made with tuna salad, which may include mayonnaise, sweetcorn, cucumber, or celery. Other common variations include the tuna boat and tuna melt.
Turkey		United States	Usually made with smoked turkey, it can also have other ingredients and condiments, such as cheese, lettuce, tomatoes, pickles, mayonnaise, and mustard.
Turkey Devonshire		United States	Hot open-faced sandwich on toasted bread with hot turkey, bacon, tomatoes, and a cheese sauce.
Vada pav		India (Maharashtra)	Potato fritter coated in chickpea flour (batata vada) in a bun.
Vegemite		Australia	Vegemite is a dark brown Australian food paste made from used brewers' yeast extract, a by-product of beer manufacturing, various vegetables, wheat, and spice additives. It is a spread for sandwiches, toast, crumpets, and cracker biscuits, as well as a filling for pastries.
Veggie burger			Hamburger-style patty made only of non-meat ingredients.
Welsh rarebit		United Kingdom	A flavorful hot cheese sauce served on toasted bread.
Wilensky's Special		Canada, Quebec	A crushed grilled cornmeal dusted kaiser roll, with yellow mustard, beef salami and beef baloney. Usually served with pickle slices.
Wrap		United States	Meats, cheeses, and vegetables rolled in a soft flatbread.
Wurstbrot (sausage bread)		Germany and Austria	Simple and common German or Austrian sandwich prepared with thin slices of lunch meat or sausage, sometimes buttered. Variations include the addition of cheese or pickle slices.
X-caboquinho		Brazil	Tucumã shavings, queijo coalho, and fried plantain between a sliced buttered French roll bread.
Xis/X		Brazil	Patty, cheese, and additional toppings depending on the variation of it. In a popular variation, called Xis-tudo, it tends to get peas, corn, ham, and bacon on top of the two base ingredients.
Yakisoba-pan		Japan	Hot dog bun stuffed with fried noodles, frequently topped with pickles, such as beni shōga, with mayonnaise.
Zapiekanka		Poland	Open-face sandwich on halved baguette or other long roll, usually topped with sautéed mushrooms, cheese, ham or other meats, and vegetables. Toasted until cheese melts and served hot with ketchup.

== See also ==
- Hot dog variations
- List of bread dishes
- List of hamburgers
- List of submarine sandwich restaurants
- Sandwich bread
- Soup and sandwich
