= PBP =

PBP may refer to:

== Organizations ==
- People Before Profit, an Irish political party
- Pittsburgh Police in Pennsylvania, U.S.
- Better Place (company), a defunct electric car company

== Science and technology ==
- alpha-Pyrrolidinobutiophenone (α-PBP), a stimulant
- Progressive bulbar palsy, a motor neuron disease
- Picture by picture, two TV pictures side-by-side, similar to picture-in-picture (PiP)

=== Proteins ===
- Penicillin-binding proteins involved in bacterial cell wall synthesis
- Presenilin binding protein, also known as Dock3 or MOCA, a protein involved in cell signaling
- Poly(A)-binding protein, which binds to the tail of messenger RNA

== Other uses ==
- Paris–Brest–Paris, an endurance cycling event
- Payback period, in finance
- Play-by-post role-playing game, a game played through online forum posts
- IATA code for Punta Islita Airport, Costa Rica
- Partners in the Blue Pacific, an informal group aimed at boosting economic and diplomatic ties with Pacific island nations
- Peanut butter and pickle sandwich, a food popularized during the Great Depression
