= Mother-in-law (sandwich) =

Chicago area fast food dish

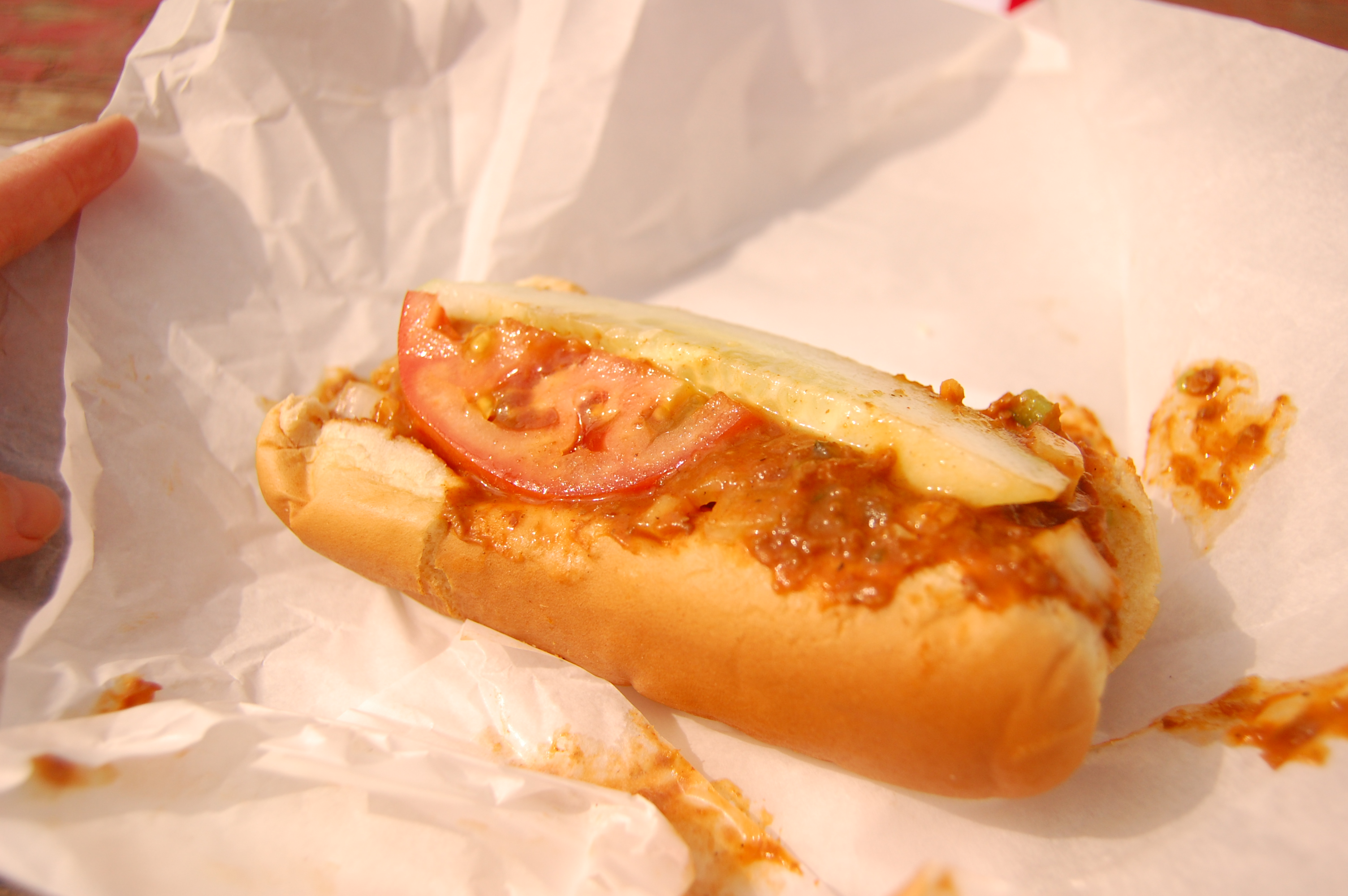
- Place of origin: Chicago
- Main ingredients: Tamale, chili, hot dog bun

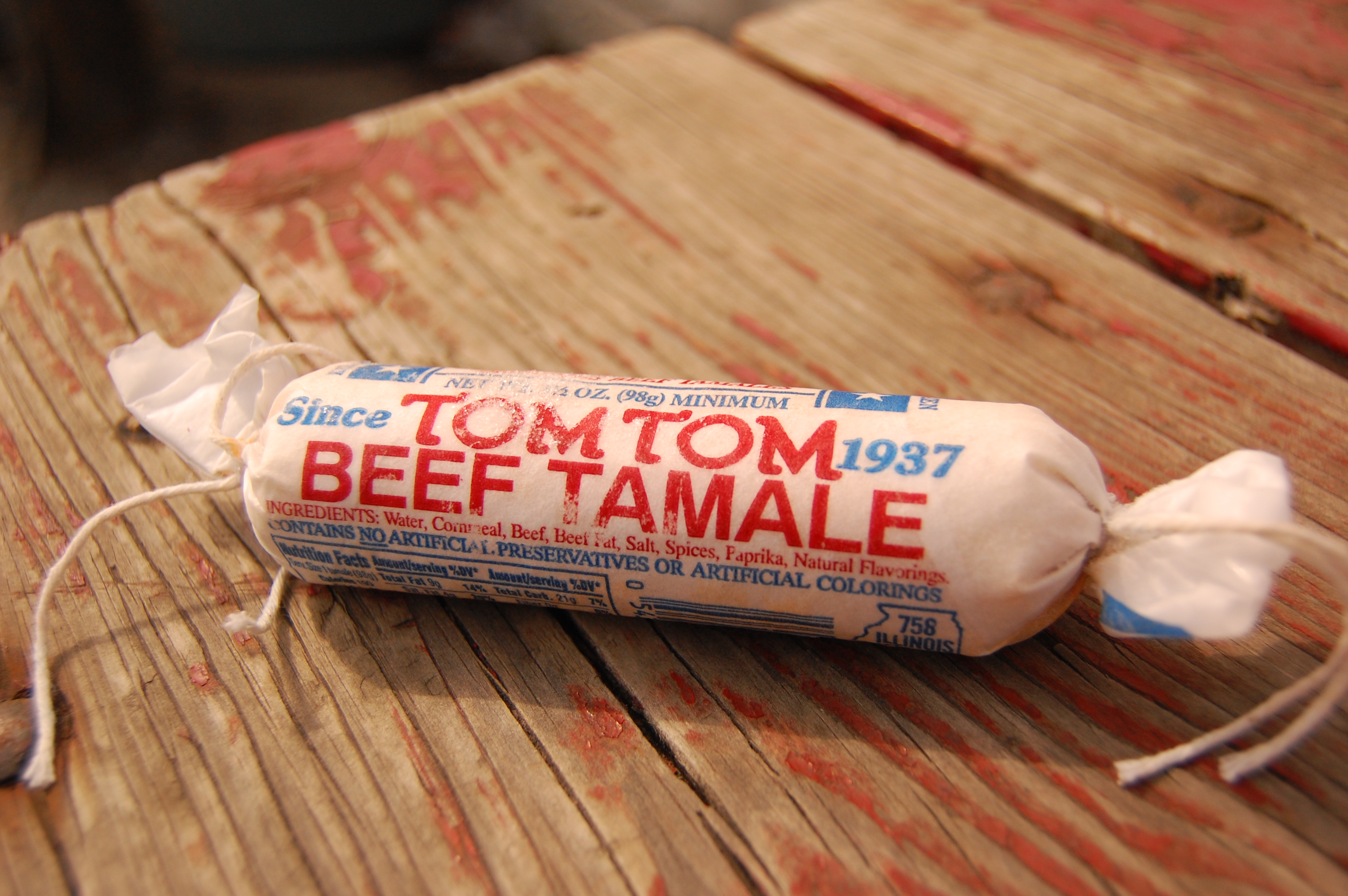
Chicago-style tamale, used to make a mother-in-law

The mother-in-law is a fast food dish of Chicago, consisting of a tamale topped with chili, served in a hot dog bun. The mother-in-law is made with Chicago's unique style of tamale, a machine-extruded cornmeal roll wrapped in paper instead of corn husks, which is typically cooked in a hot-dog steamer.

== History ==
Mexican-Americans brought the tamale to Chicago, and African-Americans from the Mississippi Delta area brought the hot tamale to the city. But no one knows how the mother-in-law sandwich developed. Some speculate it may have had its beginnings in Mexico City's torta de tamal, a tamale on a bolillo. The precise origins of the Chicago-style tamale are also obscure.

== See also ==
- List of sandwiches
