= Buk e Gjath =

Albanian sandwich

- Type: Sandwich
- Course: Main
- Place of origin: Albania
- Created by: Altin Prenga
- Invented: 2024
- Serving temperature: Warm
- Main ingredients: baguette, kaçkavall, sausage, sundried tomatoes, ground walnuts

Buk e Gjath (lit. 'Bread & Cheese') is a popular Albanian street food created by chef Altin Prenga of the restaurant Mrizi i Zanave. The original recipe features a crusty, warm baguette stuffed with local Albanian melted cheese, sausage, sundried tomatoes and ground walnuts. It is served at Prenga's restaurant of the same name on Spiro Dedja street, just off Zogu I Boulevard.

== See also ==
- List of sandwiches
