= Dwight Garner =

American journalist

- Born: January 8, 1965 (age 61); Fairmont, West Virginia, U.S.
- Education: Middlebury College
- Occupations: Writer; journalist
- Writing career
- Subjects: Criticism; non-fiction

Dwight Garner (born January 8, 1965) is an American journalist and longtime writer and editor for The New York Times.

He is the author of Garner's Quotations: A Modern Miscellany and Read Me: A Century of Classic American Book Advertisements. In 2023 he published his memoir, The Upstairs Delicatessen: On Eating, Reading, Reading About Eating, and Eating While Reading.

== Early life and education ==
Garner was born in Fairmont, West Virginia, where he grew up until relocating to Naples, Florida. While in college, he wrote book criticism for The Village Voice, and was a stringer for The New York Times and the alternative Burlington weekly Vanguard Press.

== Career ==
Garner was the arts editor of the Vermont Times. He also became a contributing editor to the Boston Phoenix. In the 1990s, Garner was a columnist for the Hungry Mind Review.

Before becoming a book critic for The New York Times in 2008, he was senior editor of The New York Times Book Review for ten years. He was the founding books editor of Salon.com, where he worked from 1995 to 1998. His monthly column in Esquire magazine was a finalist for a National Magazine Award in 2017.

His essays and journalism have appeared in Harper's Magazine, The Times Literary Supplement, the Oxford American, Slate, The Village Voice, the Boston Phoenix, The New York Times Magazine, and elsewhere.

Garner wrote a biweekly column for The New York Times called "American Beauties," which focused on underappreciated American books of the past seventy-five years.

He is a member of New York City's Organ Meat Society, co-founded by Eater food critic Robert Sietsema. In 2023, Garner's Grub Street Diet, for New York magazine, was one of their most popular pieces of the year. His 2012 New York Times essay in praise of the peanut butter and pickle sandwich, which he called "a thrifty and unacknowledged American classic," went viral internationally.

In 2023 he published his memoir, The Upstairs Delicatessen: On Eating, Reading, Reading About Eating, and Eating While Reading.

== Personal life ==
Garner lives in New York City with his wife, writer Cree LeFavour. They have two children.
