= Sol over Gudhjem =

Danish open sandwich dish

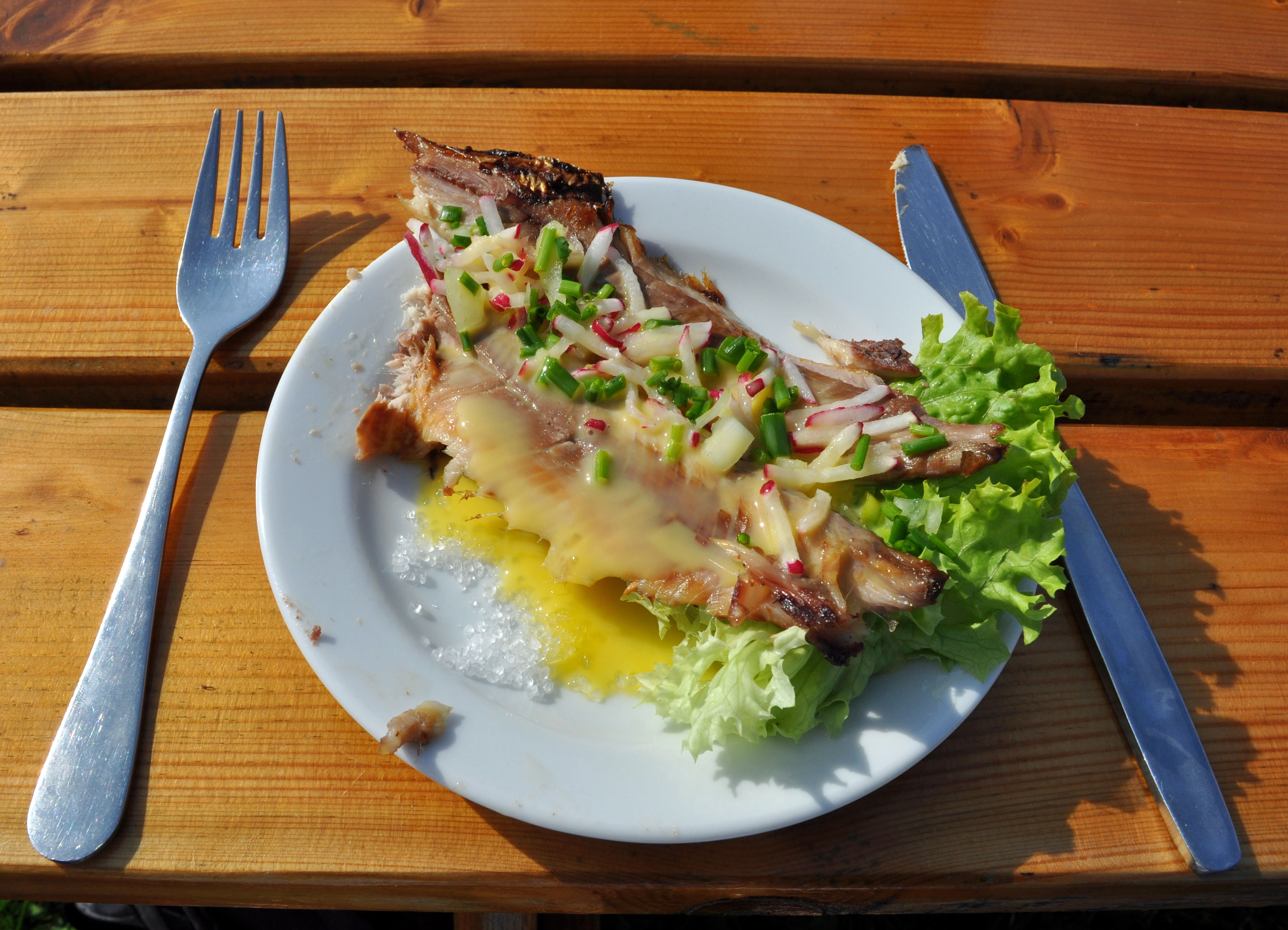
- Type: Open sandwich
- Place of origin: Denmark
- Main ingredients: Rugbrød, smoked herring, chives, egg yolk

Sol over Gudhjem, literally "sun over Gudhjem", is a Danish dish, an open sandwich with rugbrød, smoked herring, chives and a raw egg yolk (the "sun") on top. The island of Bornholm, where Gudhjem is situated, is known for its herring smokehouses. Since 2009, the name has also come to be used for a contest between top-rated chefs to create a special meal from local Bornholm products.

== See also ==
- List of sandwiches
