= Cudighi =

Italian-American sandwich from Michigan's Upper Peninsula

- Alternative names: Gudighi
- Type: Sausage
- Place of origin: United States, Italy
- Region or state: Upper Peninsula of Michigan

Cudighi (/ˈkʊdəɡiː/) is an Italian-American dish consisting of a spicy Italian sausage seasoned with sweet spices that can be bought in links or served as a sandwich on a long, hard roll, often with mozzarella cheese and tomato sauce. It is primarily found in the Upper Peninsula of Michigan in the Midwestern United States.

== Preparation ==
Cudighi can be served many ways in many Italian-American dishes. As a sandwich, it was originally served with raw onions and mustard on a roll, but is today typically served with mozzarella cheese and tomato sauce. Additional toppings may include mushrooms, onions, and green peppers.

The taste of Cudighi varies with the amount of clove and cinnamon present in the mix.

== History ==
Cudighi appears to be derived from Cotechino, a Northern Italian fresh sausage made from pork, fatback, and pork rind, and is primarily found in the Upper Peninsula of Michigan, particularly in Marquette County. The sandwich and its distinctive sausage were first sold in northern Michigan by Italian immigrants in 1936, who called it Gudighi. The sandwich was originally dressed with mustard and onions; using tomato sauce and mozzarella cheese as toppings became popular following World War II.

== See also ==
- List of sandwiches
