= Wurstbrot =

Slice of bread spread with sliced lunch meat or sausage

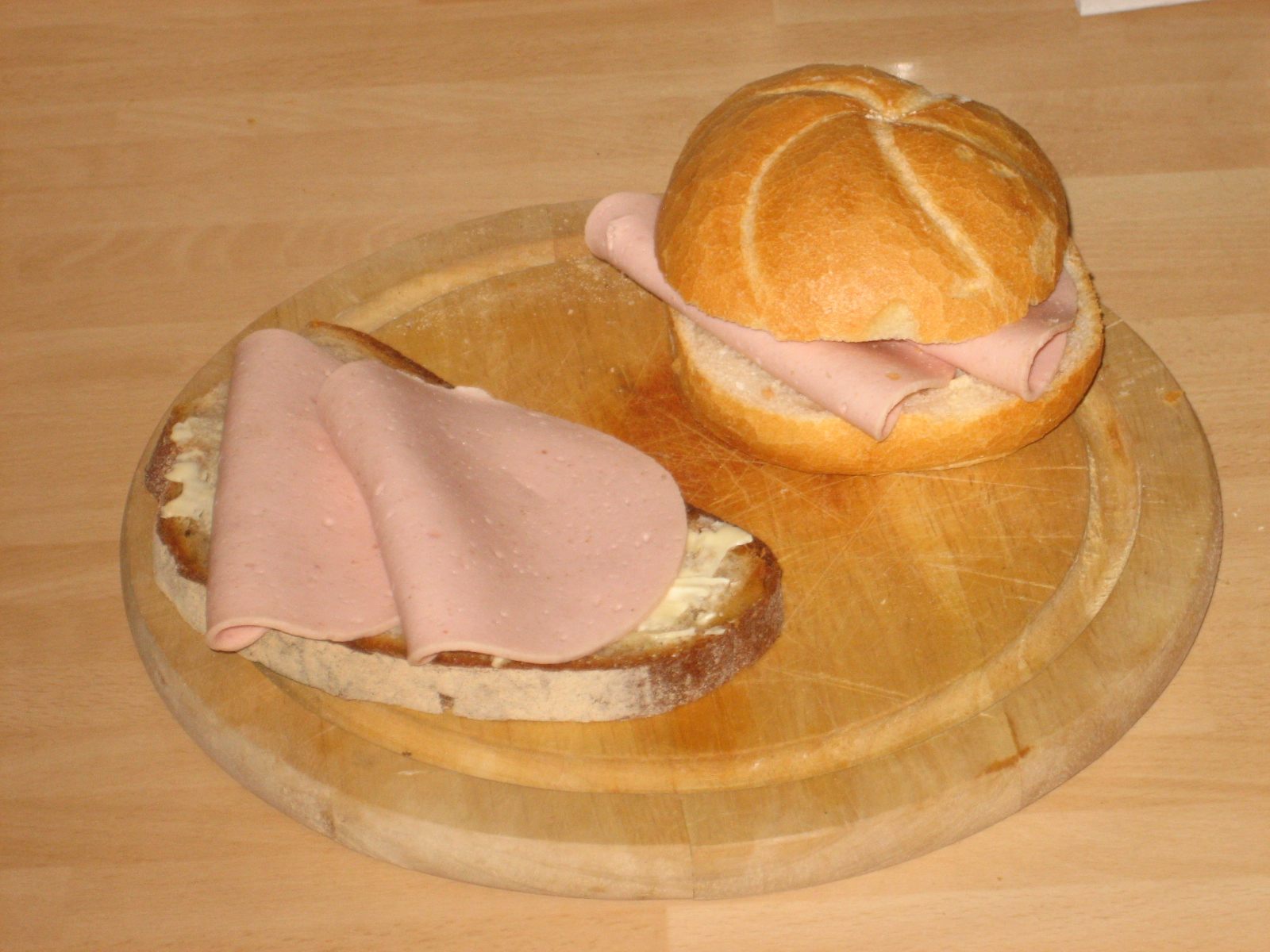
- A Wurstbrot and a Wurstbrötchen with Lyonerwurst (Bologna sausage)
- Type: Sandwich
- Place of origin: Germany
- Main ingredients: Bread, cold cuts or sausage

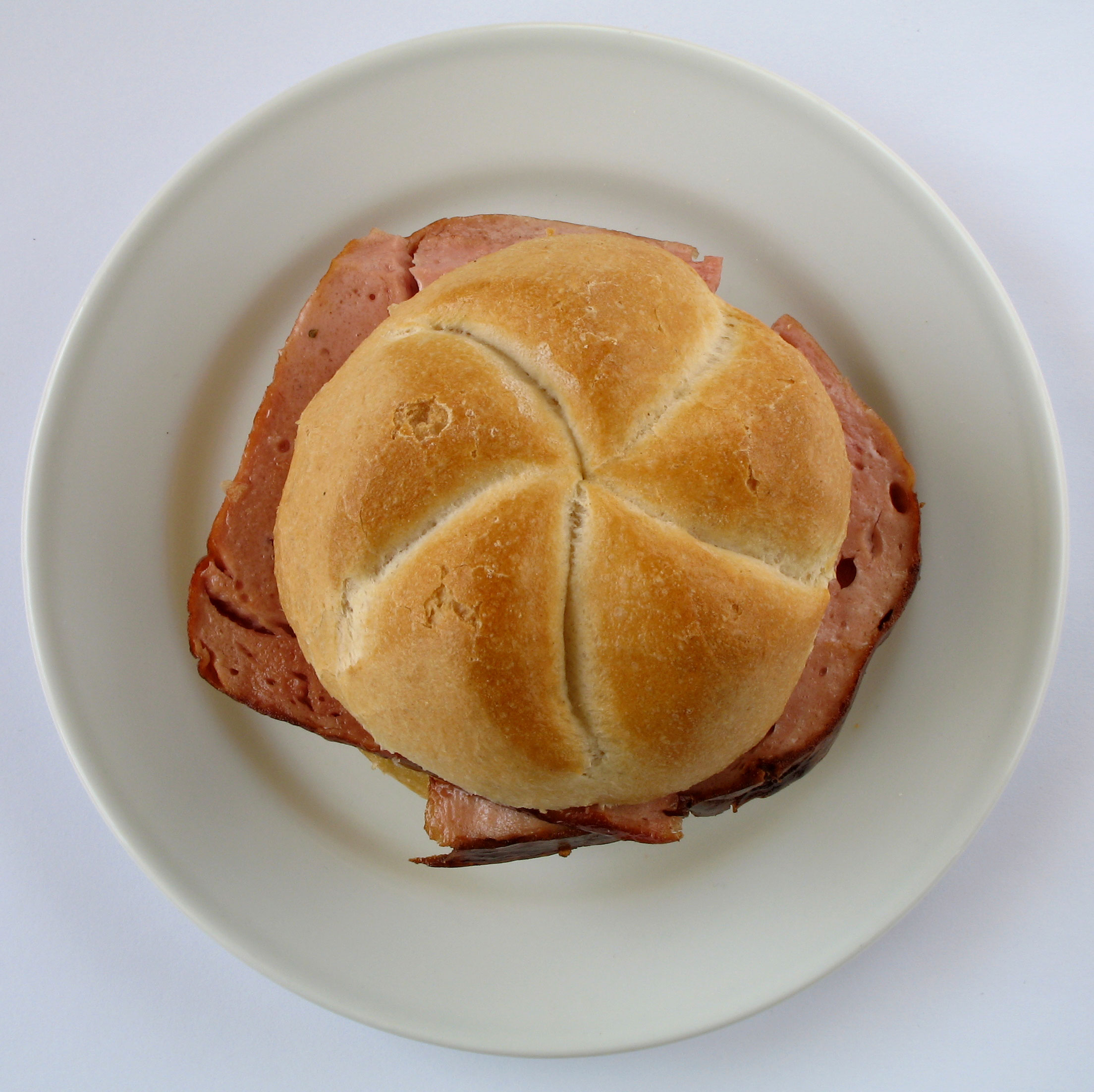
A Leberkäsbrötchen

A Wurstbrot is a slice of bread spread with slices of lunch meat or sausage. Additionally, the bread may be buttered to taste. It is a very simple and typical German type of sandwich, generally home-made, eaten cold, and popular as a snack, packed lunch as well as for breakfast or supper.

If the sausage is put on a bread roll, it is called Wurstbrötchen in northern Germany, and Wurstsemmel in the south. It is commonly sold at bakeries, at the butcher's shop or snack shops and sometimes garnished with sliced pickles, lettuce, tomato or Tartar sauce.

Very similar ingredients but with a thick slice of a finely minced baked sausage called Leberkäse on a roll is called Leberkäsbrötchen, Leberkäswecken or Leberkässemmel. It is usually served hot and sold at snack shops, at the butcher and often at public fairs. Mustard or ketchup may be added to taste, while butter is usually left out.

== See also ==
- List of sandwiches
