= Ayvalık toast =

Type of sandwich

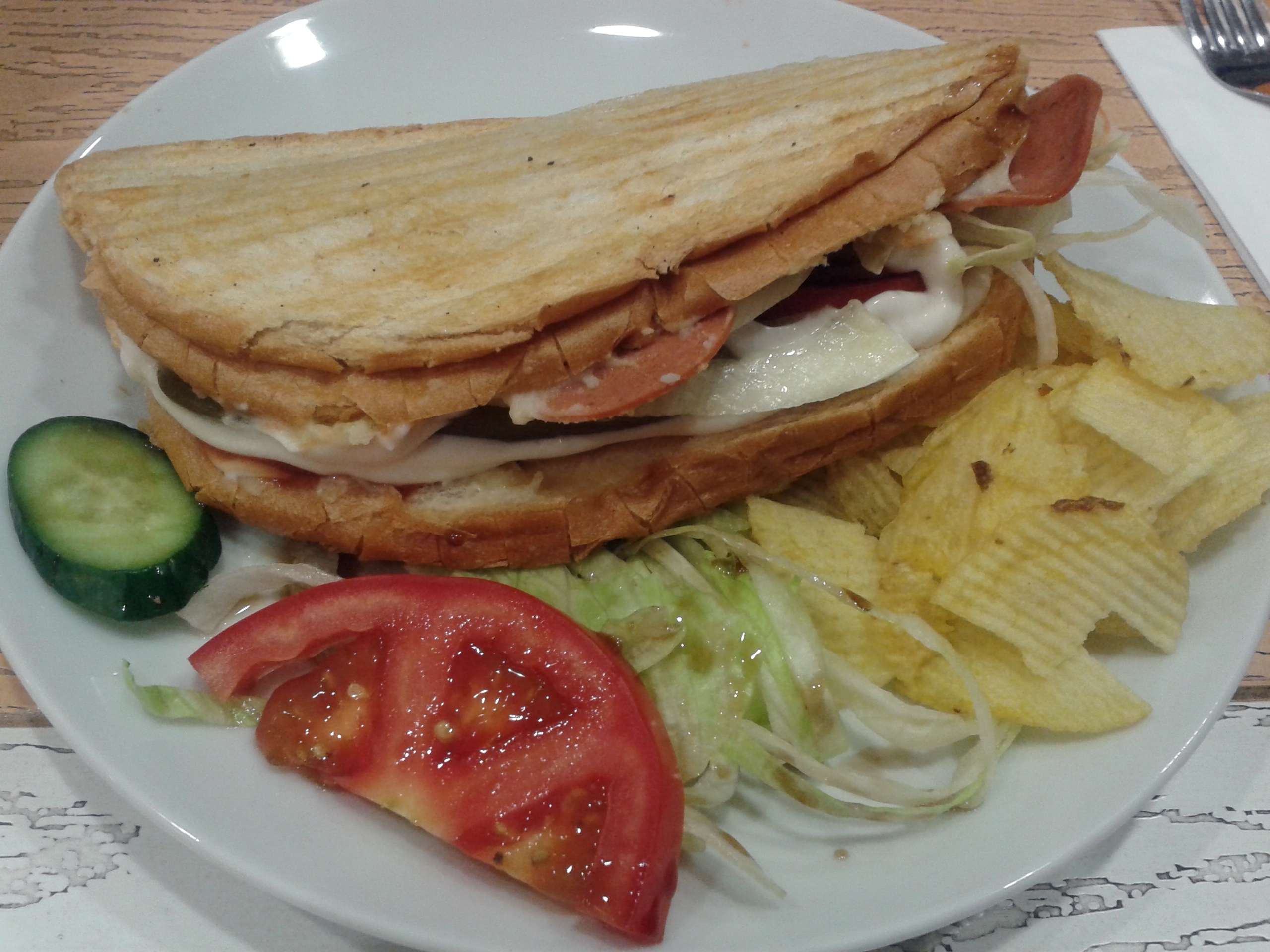
- Ayvalık toast in Ankara
- Type: Sandwich
- Place of origin: Turkey
- Main ingredients: Bread, sausage, cheese

Ayvalık toast is a sandwich of Turkish origin. It is made in a sandwich press and usually contains such ingredients as cheese, sausage, pastirma, or sucuk. Its name derives from the seaside town of Ayvalık in Balıkesir Province.

== See also ==
- Kumru
