= Beirute =

Brazilian sandwich

Beirute sandwich
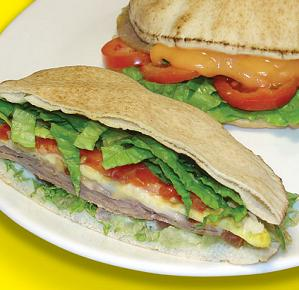
- Type: Sandwich
- Place of origin: Brazil
- Region or state: São Paulo

Beirute is a São Paulo sandwich created in 1951 by Lebanese immigrant Farer Sader. The Beirute sandwich uses two whole pieces of bread, not inside the pocket of a single piece of bread. The contents of a Beirute can vary greatly; the most found ingredients are pita bread, roast beef or sliced silverside, or ham, cheese, lettuce, tomato slices and a fried egg.

The Beirute sandwich developed from the blending of cultural influences in cities like São Paulo. The name Beirute is a reference to the capital of Lebanon, from where many Lebanese Brazilians migrated.

The Beirute has similarities with other sandwiches in Brazil: The combination of ham and cheese exists in the misto-quente toasted sandwich, and ham or roast beef with cheese and tomato exists in the Bauru. The combination of lettuce with tomato (and sometimes egg) also exists in some hamburger recipes. This type of sandwich is found in various regions and cities of Brazil. Some cafeterias, as well as places that serve hamburgers, serve it with French fries and soda, an influence of American cuisine.

== See also ==
- Kebab
- Sfiha
- List of sandwiches
