= Chacarero =

Chilean sandwich

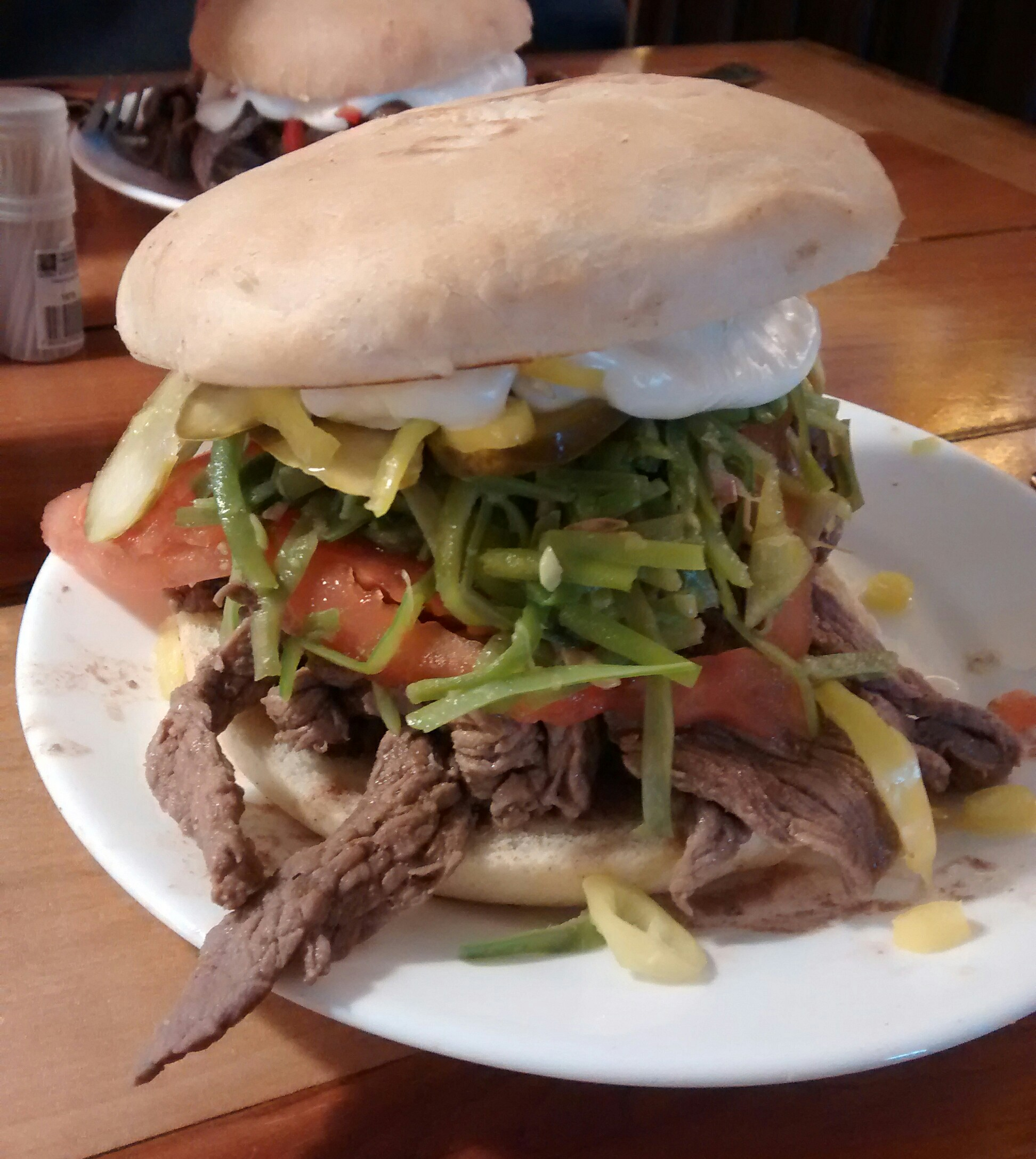
- Place of origin: Chile
- Main ingredients: Bread

Chacarero is a Chilean sandwich made with thinly sliced churrasco-style steak or lomito-style pork on a round roll with tomatoes, green beans, mayonnaise, and optionally ají verde pepper.

It is one of the many varieties of sandwich served in Chilean fuentes de soda, or schoperías, restaurants equivalent to the British concept of a greasy spoon, that serve fast food and draught beer.

It was considered by Time magazine as one of "The 13 Most Amazing Sandwiches the World Has to Offer".

== See also ==
- List of sandwiches
