= Bokit =

Guadeloupean sandwich

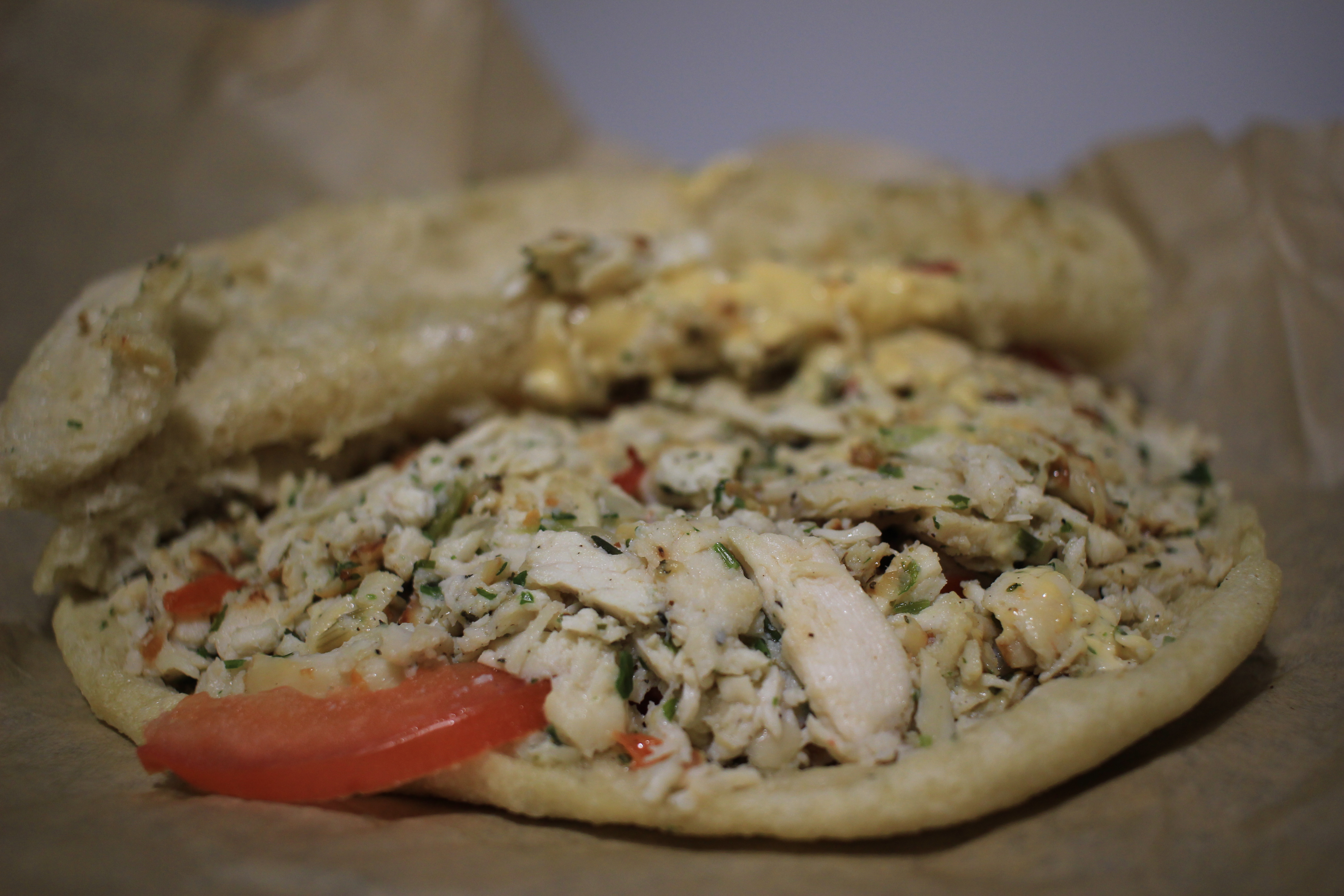
An open bokit, with chicken.

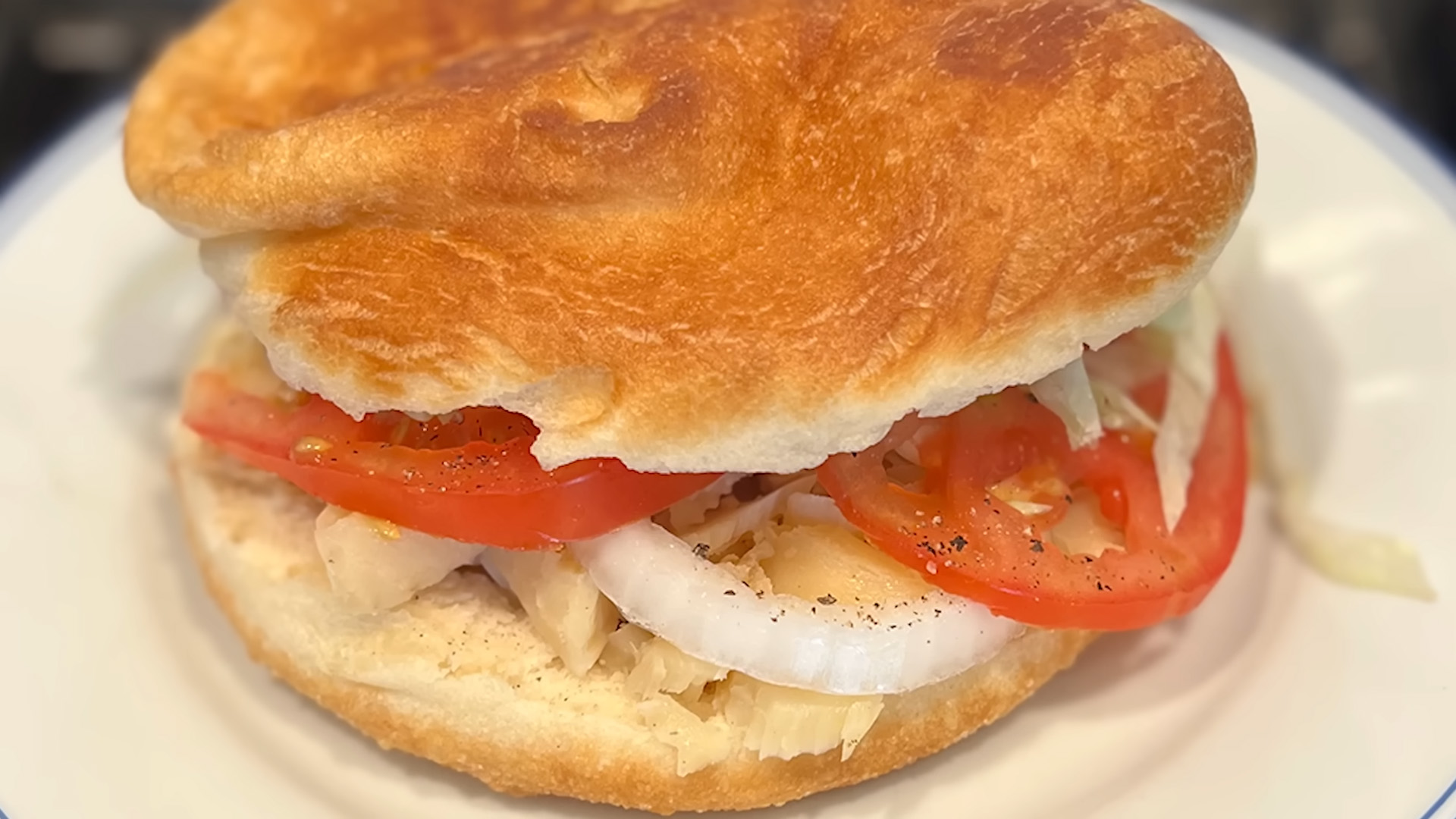
A salt cod bokit

Bokit is a Guadeloupean sandwich fried in a saucepan with hot sunflower oil.

== Composition ==
It is essentially composed of flour, water, salt and bicarbonate or yeast.

== History ==
This typical Guadeloupean food started to develop in the mid-19th century after the abolition of slavery. At this time, the poorest workers could not even buy some of the basic products such as bread. As they were good observers and resourceful, they had the idea to adapt and produce a bread by themselves, without yeast at this time, and cooked in a saucepan with hot oil that they used to call "kettle bread" because of the vapor going out of it.

Bokit was inspired by the "johnny cake" which is a kind of fried bread that the New England colonies may have borrowed from the Indians. Indeed, the Shawnee Indians used to cook a pancake of corn on hot stones that could be kept for long trips. Those pancakes could have inspired the colonists who added wheat flour. Indians used to call their pancake jonikin, but the colonists used to say journey cake, because of the long journeys in which this cookie was very useful. Finally the name johnny cake remained.

Over the exchanges between the Caribbean colonies during the 18th century, this fried bread became the djoncake in Dominica and Barbados. People on French island heard djonkit or dannkit. As this product's design and content evolved over the years until looking like a sandwich, it has been given the final name of "Bokit" in Guadeloupe, and has become a typical Guadeloupean speciality.

== Cultural references ==
- Punk rock band The Bolokos mentioned bokits on their song "How Many Bokits?".
- Dancehall artist Riddla wrote a song called "Bokit".
