= Har cheong gai =

Singaporean fried chicken dish

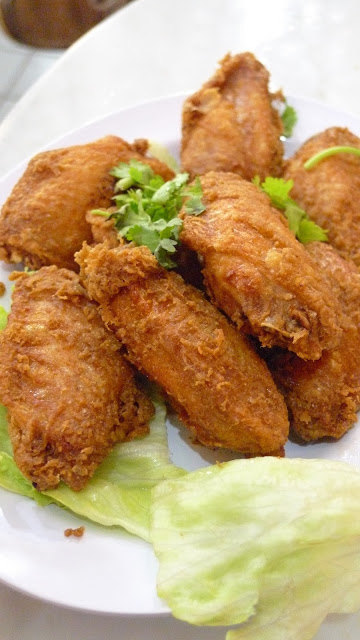
- Har cheong gai
- Alternative names: Shrimp paste chicken
- Place of origin: Singapore
- Serving temperature: Hot
- Main ingredients: Chicken mid wings, shrimp sauce, Chinese wine, white pepper, garlic and ginger juice

Chinese name
- Traditional Chinese: 蝦醬雞
- Simplified Chinese: 虾酱鸡
Transcriptions
Standard Mandarin
- Hanyu Pinyin: xiā jiàng jī
Yue: Cantonese
- Yale Romanization: hā jeung gāi

Har cheong gai (simplified Chinese: 虾酱鸡; traditional Chinese: 蝦醬雞; pinyin: xiā jiàng jī; Cantonese Yale: hā jeung gāi; lit. 'shrimp paste chicken'), is a Singaporean fried chicken dish, consisting of fried chicken wings in a batter with fermented shrimp paste.

== Description ==
Har cheong gai is regarded as one of the most popular family fried chicken dishes in Singapore, and is made with fermented shrimp paste (har cheong) and a host of other spices and ingredients. The shrimp paste used is not the darker Malaysian style paste used for rojak sauce, but the pinkish grey southeastern Chinese style.

The recipe for har cheong gai differs from other fried chicken recipes in that the marinade and the batter are not separate; rather wheat flour and potato or corn starch is added to the marinade, creating a seasoned batter. Depending on the recipe followed this is done at the very startor just prior to frying after the chicken has been allowed to marinate, in both cases the chicken is often allowed to marinate overnight,

== Har cheong gai burger ==
A har cheong gai burger is a chicken sandwich from Singapore. It is made up of har cheong gai in a sesame seed bun with salad and mayonnaise.

== See also ==
- List of chicken dishes
- Taiwan fried chicken
- Crispy fried chicken
- Ayam goreng
- Chicken with chilies
- Korean fried chicken
