= Morning roll =

Airy, chewy bread roll popular in Scotland

A morning roll containing fried egg and lorne sausage.

The morning roll, also known as a softie (Scots: saftie), Scotch Morning Roll or a Glasgow roll (Scots: Glesga roll) is an airy, chewy bread roll popular in Scotland. It is widely eaten as a breakfast food with Scottish breakfast items such as bacon, Lorne sausage, black pudding, haggis, fried eggs and tattie scones, and there are many dedicated cafés and "roll shops" which primarily sell hot filled morning rolls.

Scottish morning rolls are sold in bakeries, petrol stations, newsagents and supermarkets. Their airy texture and savoury flavour is due to long fermentation periods of up to 16 hours.

== Variants ==
Recipes for morning rolls vary by baker and by area, with rolls made in Edinburgh being a little sweeter due to a higher fat content, and rolls in Dundee having more flour coating.

The well-fired roll is given a stronger flavour in its bulk fermentation and baked at a higher temperature, and has a dark crust. In addition to Scottish morning rolls in general, well-fired rolls are also known as Glasgow rolls.

In Fife, a cabin biscuit or cabin roll (Scots pronunciation: [ˈkebɪn]) is a local variant. Originating in Buckhaven, extra sugar was added to extend the life of the roll, for use by crews on fishing boats. They bear distinctive prick marks on top. It is a bread roll and not similar to a biscuit in the conventional British sense.

== Cultural importance ==
In 2026, a campaign was started to give the morning roll UNESCO status as part of their Living Heritage project. This campaign was backed by the Scottish Greens party with MSP Holly Bruce lodging a motion in the Scottish Parliament to celebrate its history. This motion was later backed by MSPs from both Scottish Labour and the Scottish National Party.

== See also ==
- Breakfast roll
