= Xis (sandwich) =

Brazilian grilled sandwich

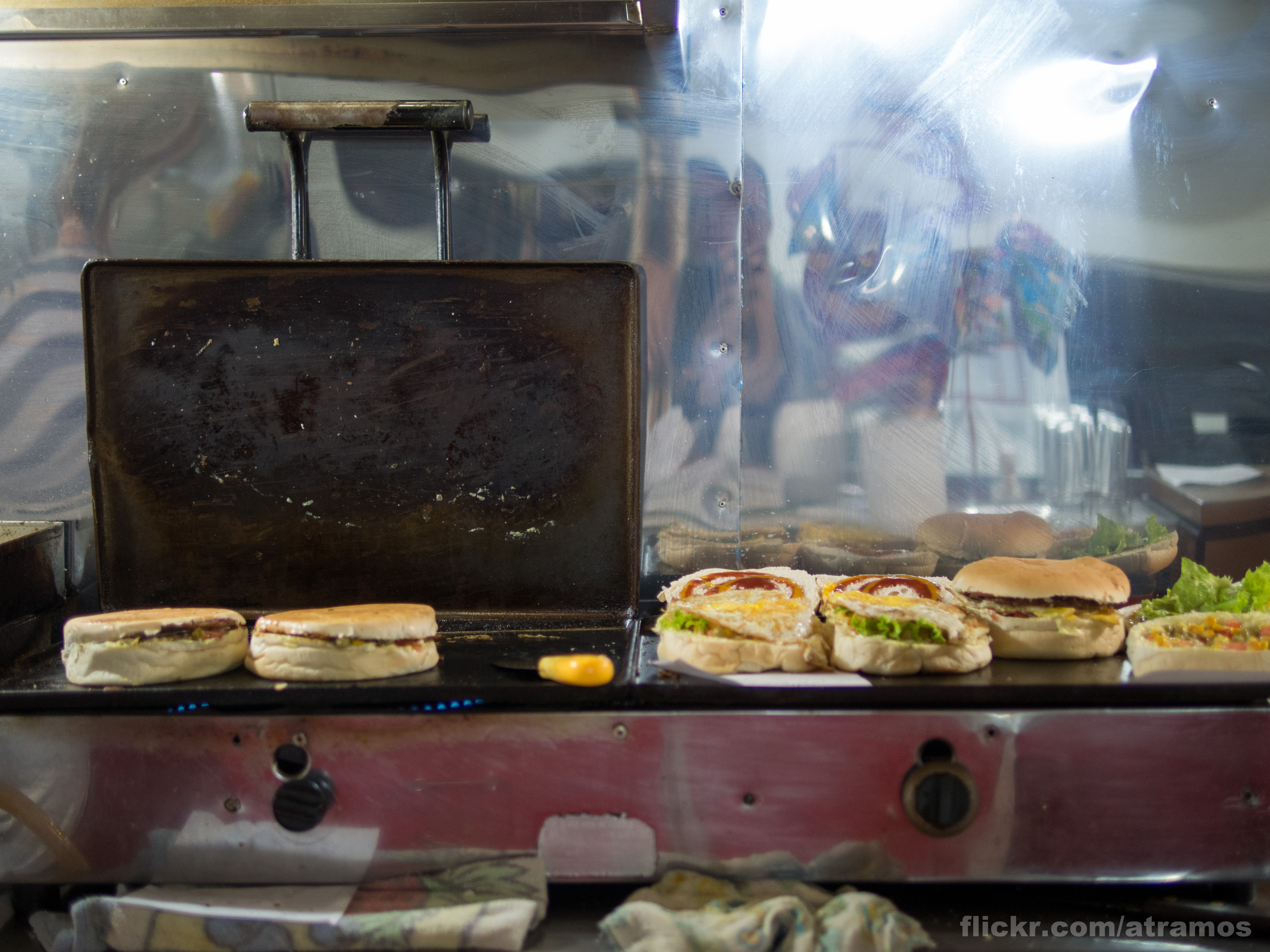
- Xis sandwiches being prepared on a grill
- Alternative names: Xis gaúcho
- Type: Sandwich
- Place of origin: Brazil
- Region or state: Rio Grande do Sul
- Associated cuisine: Brazilian cuisine
- Serving temperature: Hot

A Xis, also known as a Xis gaúcho, is a sandwich from the Brazilian state of Rio Grande do Sul that was inspired by the American cheeseburger. The sandwich consists of meat, cheese, lettuce, tomato, peas, corn, and mayonnaise served on a bread bun larger than a typical hamburger bun (around 18 cm diameter). The meat used can vary with some common choices being a beef patty, chicken hearts, fish fillets, chicken breast, calabresa sausage, bacon, or fried eggs. Vegetarian variants that use meat alternatives exist. The sandwich is pressed on a grill and served hot.

The sandwich is commonly eaten for dinner after social events.

== Origin ==
The name Xis comes from the Brazilian Portuguese pronunciation of the English word cheese from cheeseburger.

While the origin of the sandwich is unknown, it existed in restaurants across Rio Grande de Sul by the mid-1970s. According to César Augusto Ribas Moreira, PRB councilor of Canoas, the first restaurant in Canoas to sell Xis sandwiches opened on May 28 in the 1960s.

On 7 January 2016, Municipal Law Nº 5990 was passed in Canoas and inaugurated May 28 as Xis day. The law also set Canoas as the reference city for the typical Xis sandwich and location of an annual Xis festival.
