= Savoury pattie =

Deep fried mashed potato

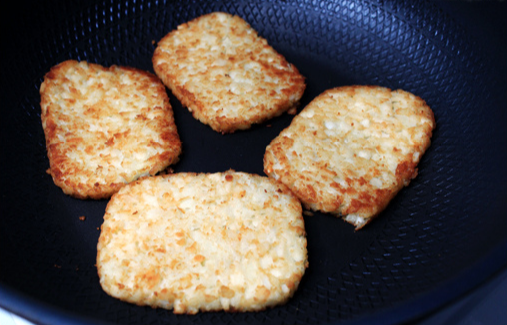
- Square patties
- Alternative names: Hull pattie
- Place of origin: United Kingdom
- Region or state: Hartlepool, Kingston upon Hull, Wirral, Liverpool, North Scotland
- Main ingredients: Mashed potato batter, sage, onion

A savoury pattie or Hull pattie is made from mashed potato and onion, seasoned with salt, pepper and sage. It is floured and fried. It is commonly sold in the British city of Kingston upon Hull, where it is a popular item in fish and chip shops, and is consumed either as a snack or as an inexpensive substitute for fish in a fish and chip meal. It is sometimes put into a buttered breadcake in a fish shop as a cheap but filling snack.

When the patties were prepared on an industrial scale in East Yorkshire, they were often made by women in white coats and white wellies. The women became known locally as "pattie slappers" and they had a reputation such that any argument should be avoided with them. A study into the lives of the pattie slappers was created into a memory project with Heritage Lottery Funding in 2012.

A version of the pattie appeared as one of the dishes served up in a heat of Masterchef in 2015, and Ricky Gervais tried one on the BBC programme The One Show.

== See also ==
- List of deep fried foods
- List of potato dishes
