= Serranito =

Spanish sandwich

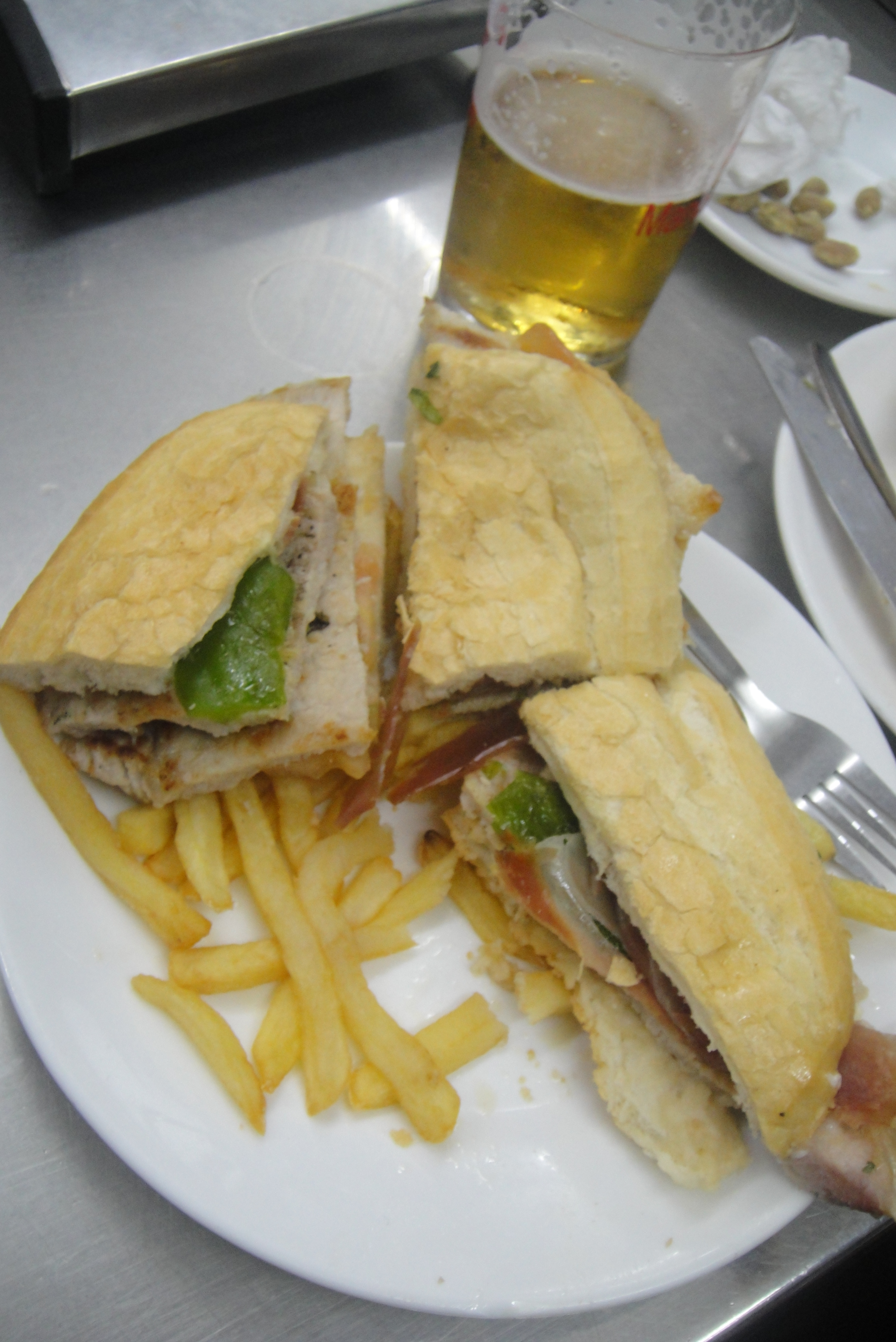
- Serranito de cerdo
- Course: Main dish
- Place of origin: Spain
- Region or state: Seville, Andalusia
- Serving temperature: Warm
- Main ingredients: Bread, grilled meat, Spanish ham, tomato

In Andalusian cuisine, a serranito is a kind of warm sandwich, popular in Seville. It is the Andalusian traditional version of fast food.

The main ingredients are grilled meat (chicken or pork loin), cured ham, fried green pepper and sliced tomato. Other versions include omelet, lettuce, cheese or fried bacon. It is frequently served with sauces such as mojo picón, mayonnaise or alioli.

It is generally consumed at lunch or dinner, as a main dish after a snack of tapas. It is often available at fairs and verbenas.

A smaller version of the serranito is known as the montadito.

As the origin of this typical dish today, there are the "Échate pa' ya" bars in the Cerro del Águila and Juan XXIII neighborhoods of Seville in the 1970s. From that formula, the ex-bullfighter José Luis Cabeza Hernández, who during his active time was known as José Luis del Serranito, patented the trademark and the term Serranito, as well as the tapa.
