= Kaisers Jagdproviant =

Tea sandwich from Austrian cuisine

Kaiser Jagdproviant is a finger sandwich from Austrian cuisine made with ham, pickles, egg and cheese. The sandwich has its origins in the Kaiser's court. Sometimes added to the basic recipe are cottage cheese, butter, mustard, anchovy paste and chives. It was also served for Arnold Schwarzenegger's gubernatorial inauguration, which included other foods of Austrian origin too, like bockwurst, weisswurst and bratwurst.
