= Nutritious sandwich =

Type of sandwich originating from Taiwan

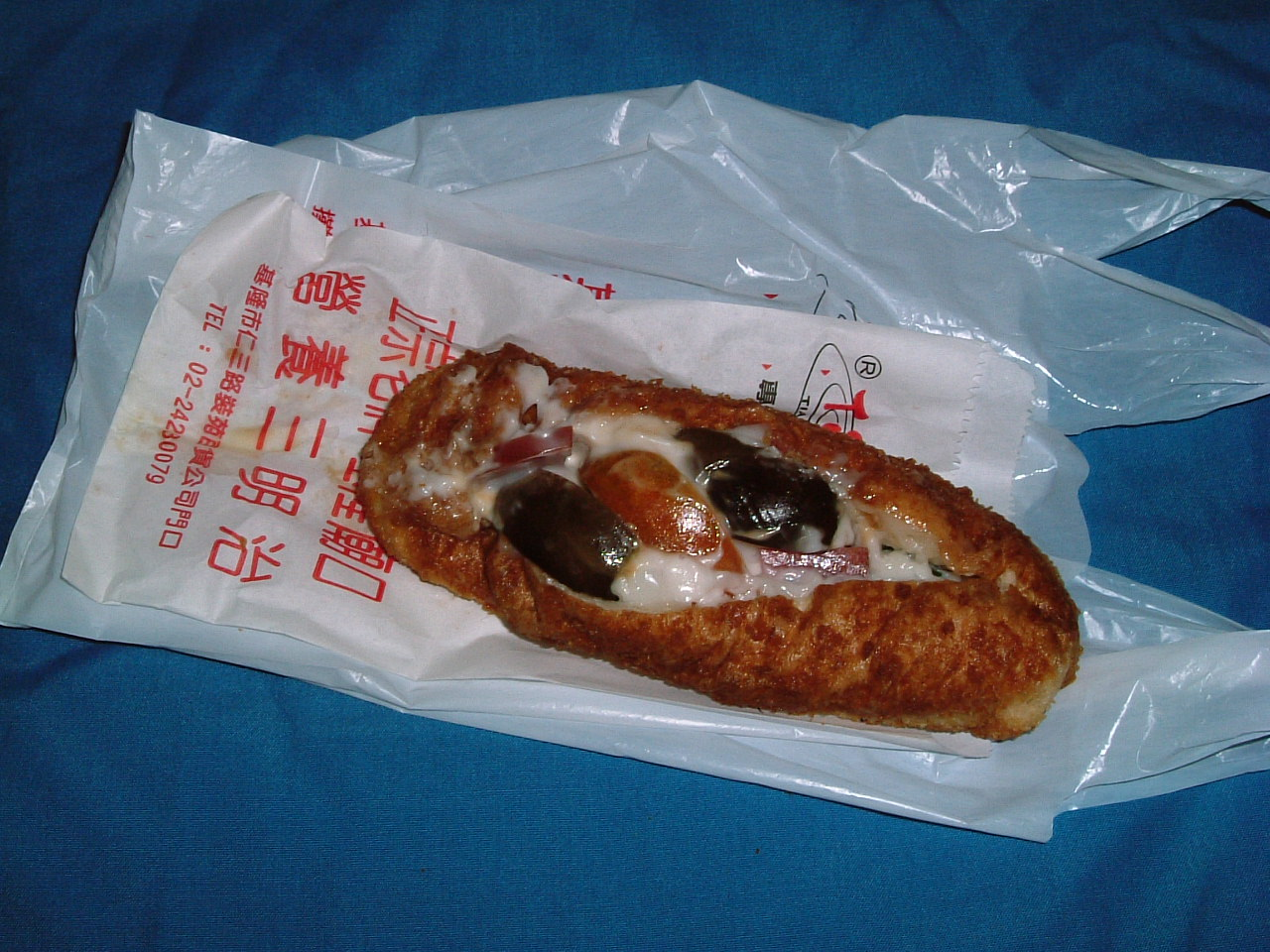
- Alternative names: Salad boat sandwich
- Place of origin: Taiwan
- Region or state: Keelung
- Main ingredients: fried bread, ham, tomatoes, cucumber, and marinated eggs

Nutritious Sandwich (Chinese: 營養三明治), also known as Salad Boat Sandwich, is a Taiwanese street food originating from Keelung Miaokou Night Market in northern Taiwan. It is essentially a deep-fried submarine sandwich coated in breadcrumbs with salad ingredients such as mayonnaise or salad dressing, ham slices, tomato slices, cucumber strips, and marinated egg (often soy-braised).

The sandwich originated in the 1950s in Keelung Port, which was a key hub of international trade and a military station for American military personnel stationed in Taiwan during the post-war era. At that time, U.S. foreign aid brought flour and deep-frying equipment to Taiwan. The term "nutritious" in the name was used in line with government campaigns to promote the consumption of wheat-based products. Despite its name, the sandwich is not particularly "nutritious" by modern health standards.

In 2017, the sandwich has also appeared in other Asian countries when it was reportedly introduced to China by a Taiwanese expatriate in Shanghai who had eaten it in Keelung and wanted to recreate the nostalgic flavour abroad.

== See also ==
- Taiwanese cuisine
- Keelung Miaokou Night Market
- Submarine sandwich
- Bánh mì
- Gua bao
