= Peanut butter and pickle sandwich =

Type of sandwich

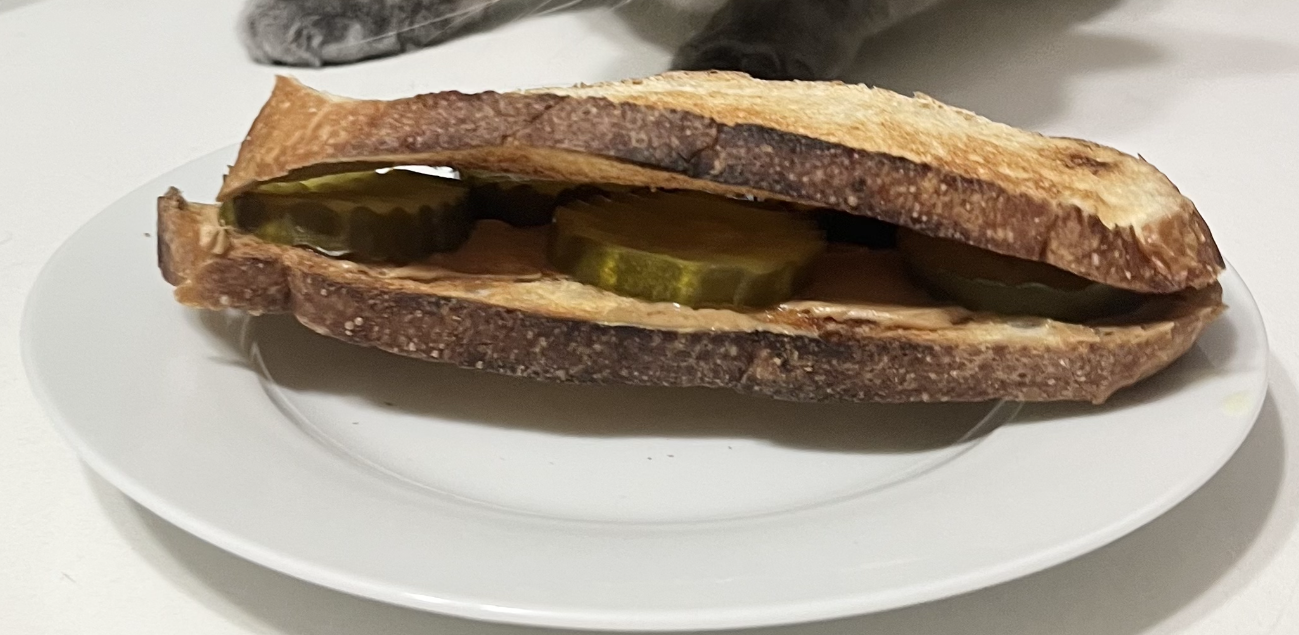
- Course: Lunch, dinner, or snack
- Place of origin: United States
- Serving temperature: Room temperature
- Main ingredients: Peanut butter, pickles, sliced bread

A peanut butter and pickle sandwich (PB&P) consists of bread, peanut butter, and pickles (bread-and-butter or kosher dills can both be used). The pickles in the peanut butter and pickle sandwich add a crunchy, and tangy feeling in the sandwich. It dates to the Depression era and has attracted attention for its appeal to stereotypical pregnancy cravings. The New York Times called it "a thrifty and unacknowledged American classic."

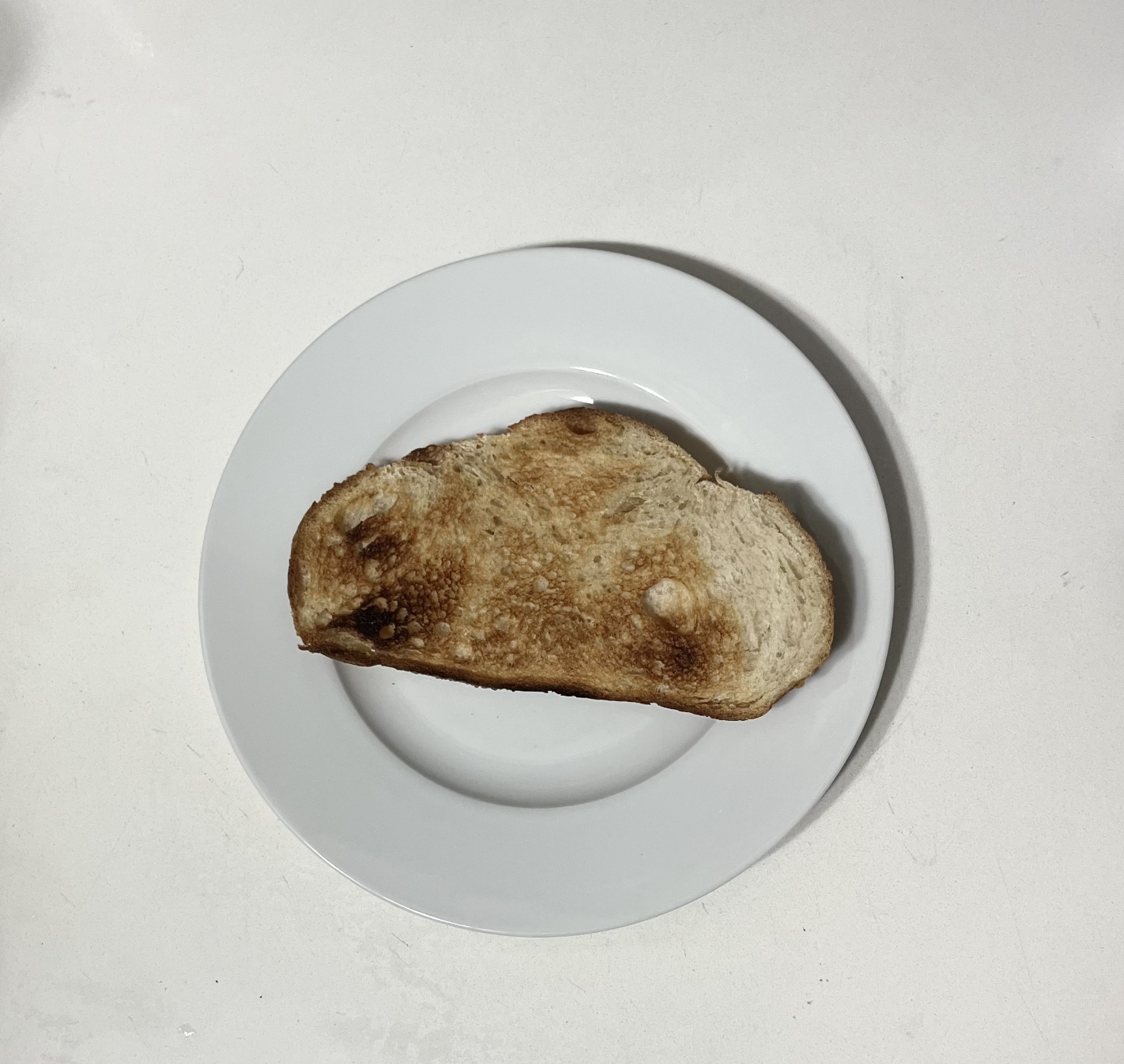
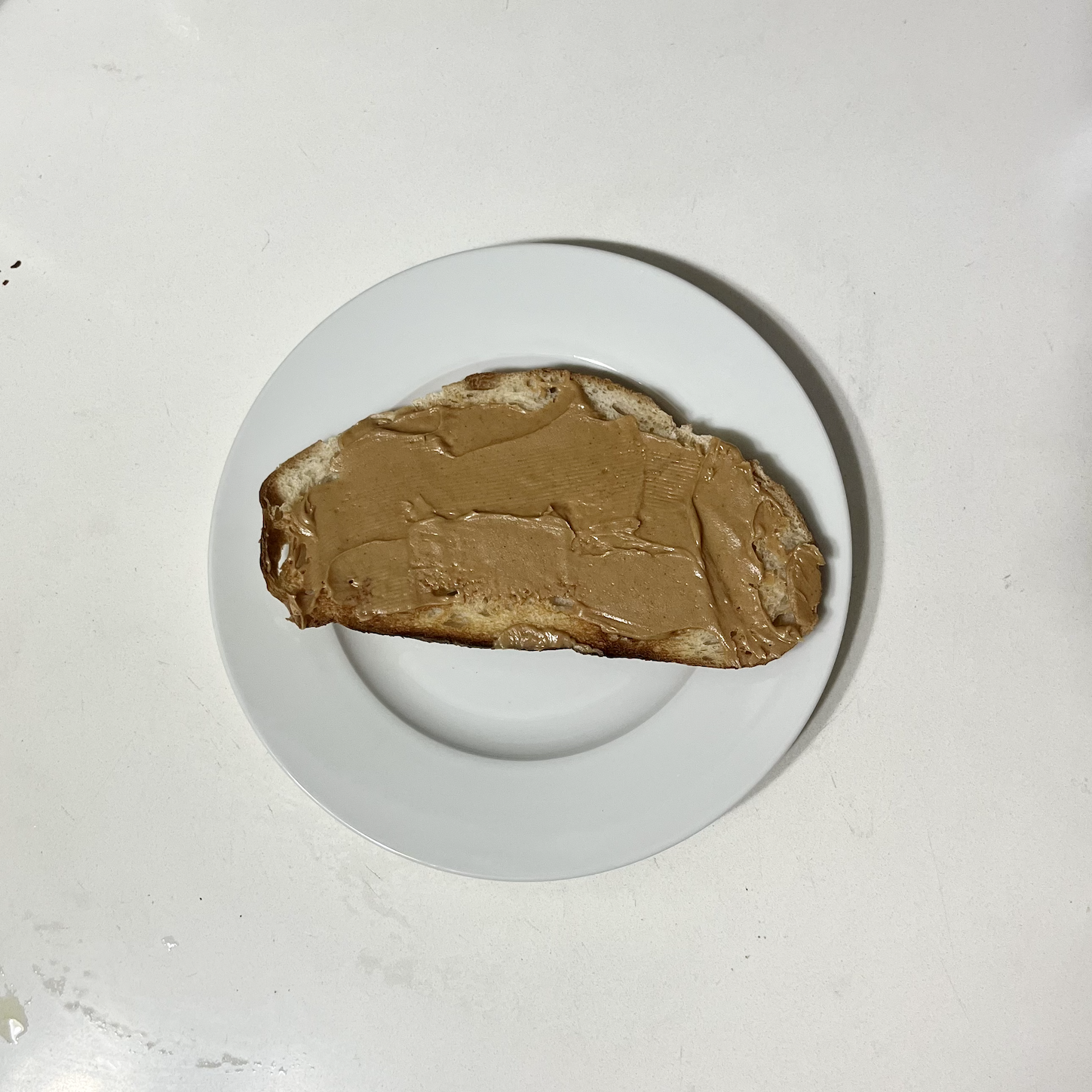
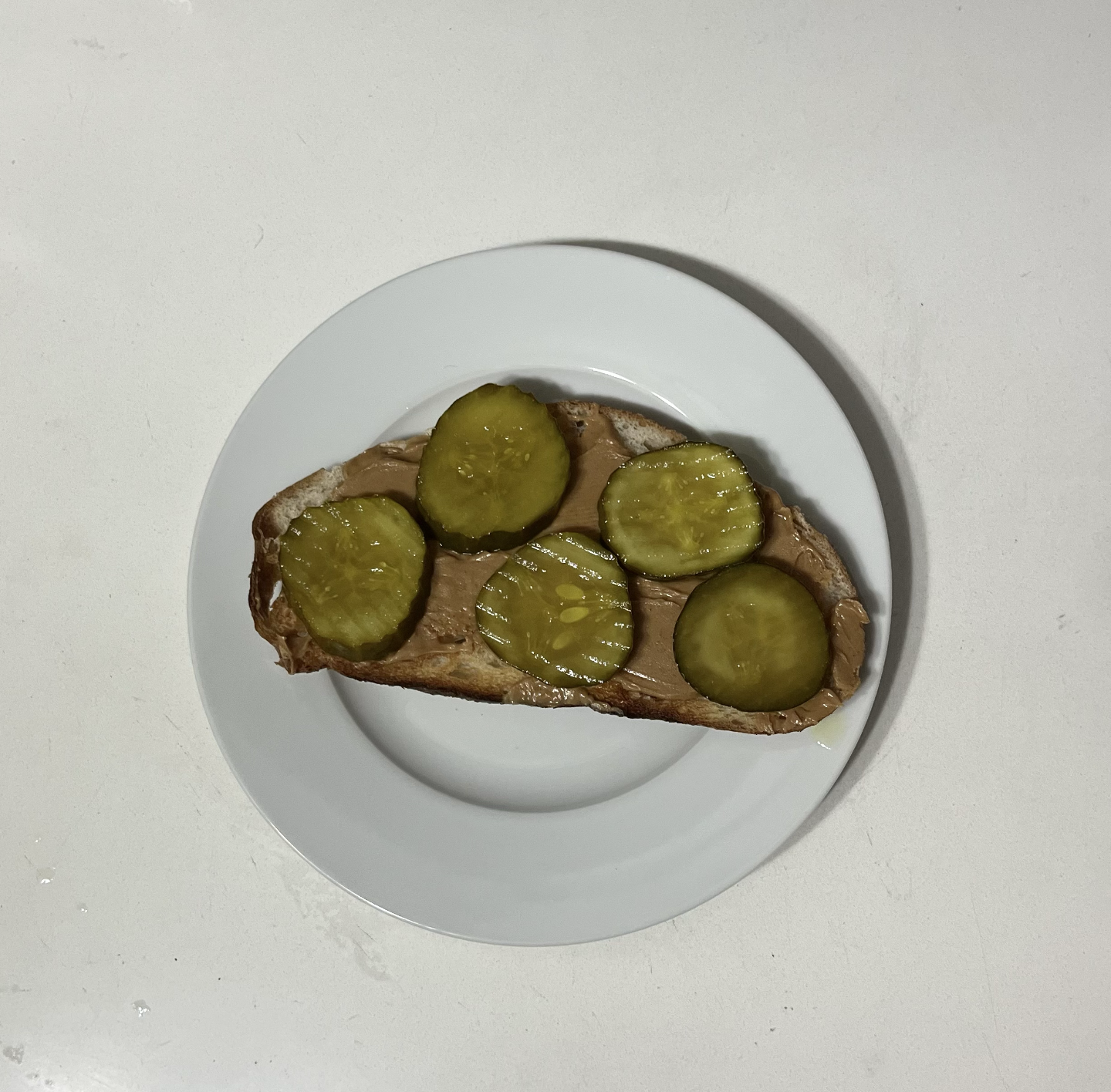
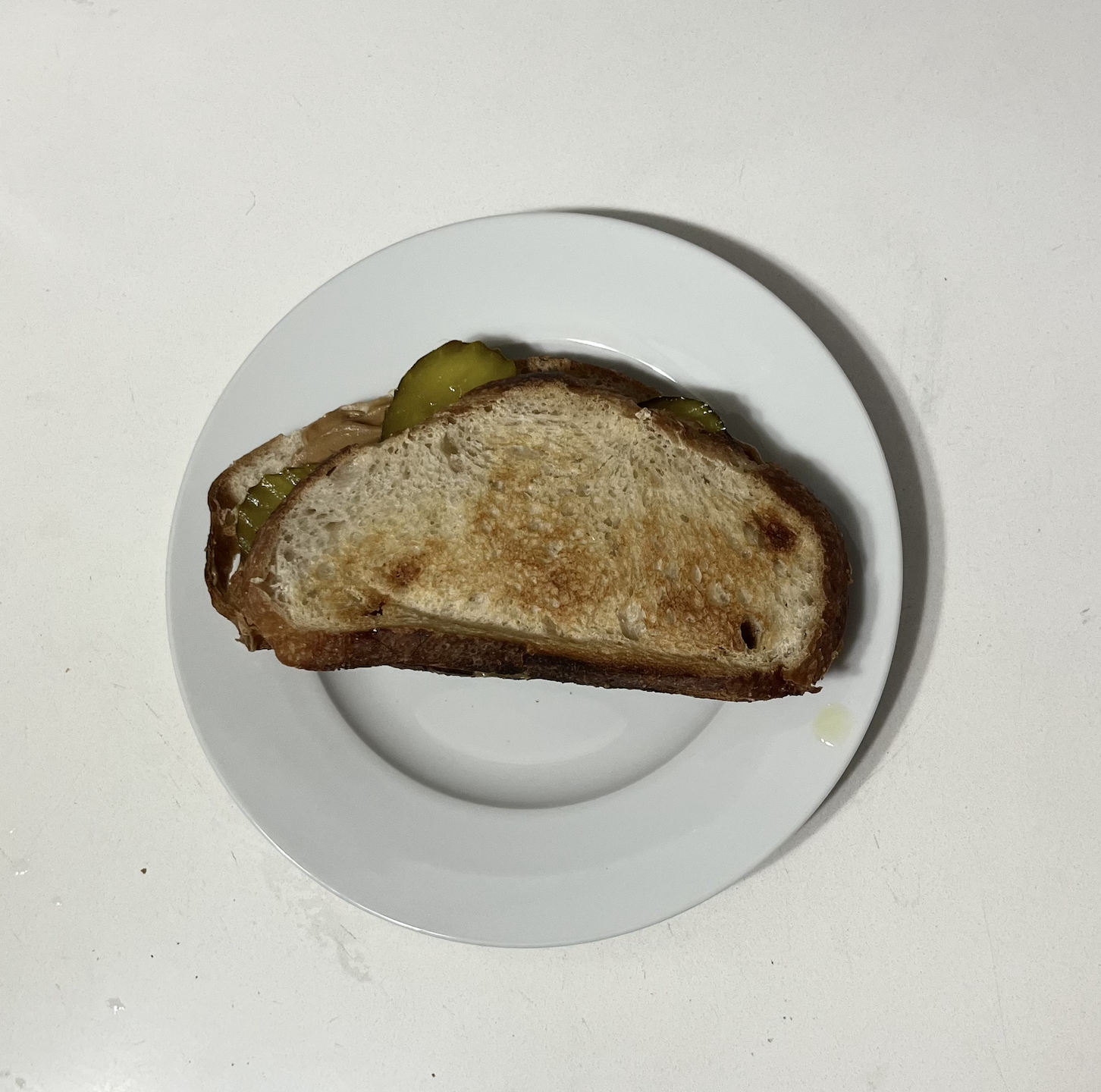
Sandwich construction from start to finish

== History ==
Peanut butter and pickle sandwiches were popular at lunch counters in the Depression era. Cookbooks from the 1930s and 40s feature the sandwich with relish rather than canned, crunchy pickles. In The New York Times, writer Dwight Garner called it "one of those unlikely pairings that shouldn't work, but does" and "a minority enthusiasm in America for generations, lingering just under the radar."

The Times has reposted Garner's article, causing several spurts of increased attention. The combination of savory and sour is common in South and East Asian cuisines, such as Thai papaya salad, which has raw peanuts with a lime and rice vinegar–based dressing.

Former MLB pitcher Phil Hughes called it a "top tier sandwich". Kinsey Millhone, a character in the alphabet series of mysteries by Sue Grafton, is depicted as an avowed fan. The brand Peanut Butter & Co. sells a peanut butter and pickle sandwich called "Pregnant Lady" at its store in Greenwich Village. On September 9, 2019, Hostess posted a photo on Twitter of a box of Twinkies that were "Peanut Butter and Pickle Sandwich" flavor. After generating online attention, the brand revealed that the flavor was just a joke.

Varieties of the pickle sandwich replace the peanut butter with other spreads such as butter and mayo, and some more of these varieties have hot sauce and bacon in.

== See also ==
- Fool's Gold Loaf
- Peanut butter, banana and bacon sandwich
- List of sandwiches
