= Doughnut sandwich =

Food

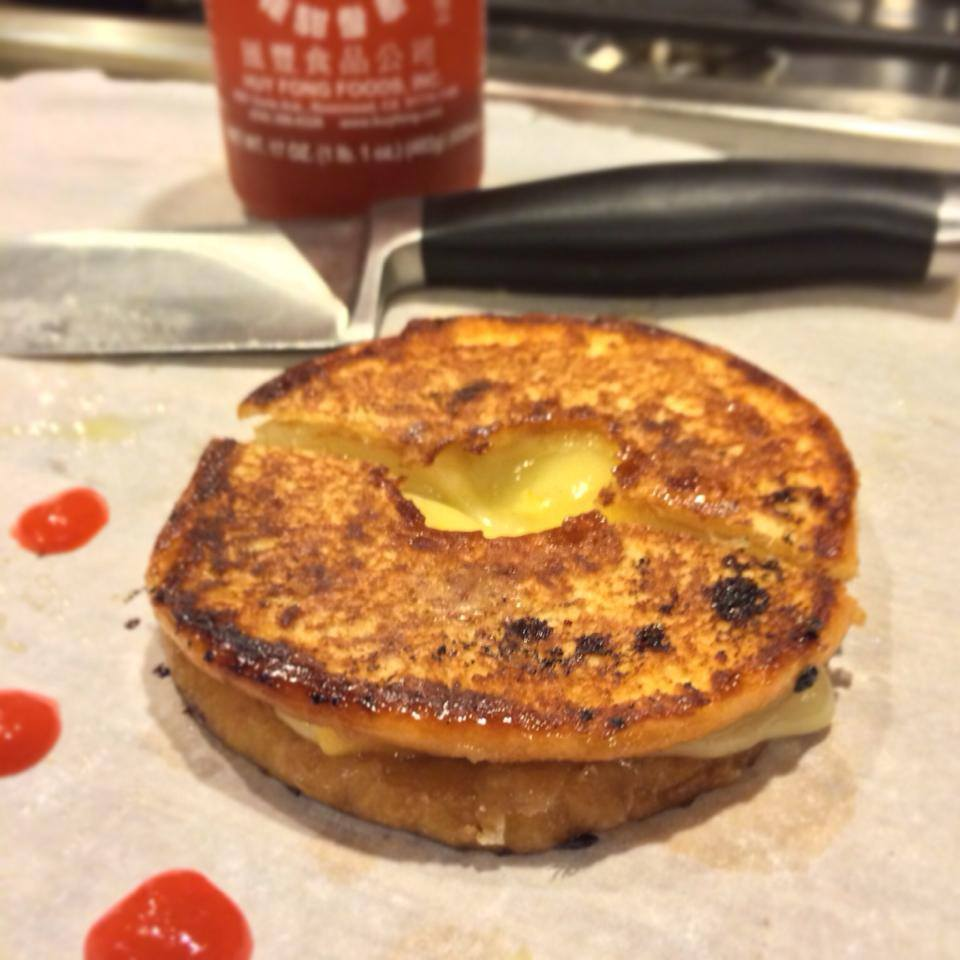
A typical doughnut sandwich with cheese

A doughnut sandwich is a combination of a doughnut and a sandwich, typically constructed using a glazed, deep-fried flour doughnut and split in the middle like a bagel. Various types of foods, such as cheese, bacon, peanut butter and more, are usually added between the slices creating a sandwich. There are different types of doughnut sandwiches, some made with cake doughnuts.

The doughnut breakfast sandwich is usually made with bacon, eggs, sausage and some type of cheese like cheddar or American cheese. Some variations may include sausage. The Luther Burger is a bacon cheeseburger served on a doughnut bun. The doughnut chicken sandwich is made with fried chicken. A ham variation can be made with ham, Swiss cheese and a condiment like fruit preserved or spicy mustard. Dessert versions are made with ice cream.
