= Kottenbutter =

German sandwich

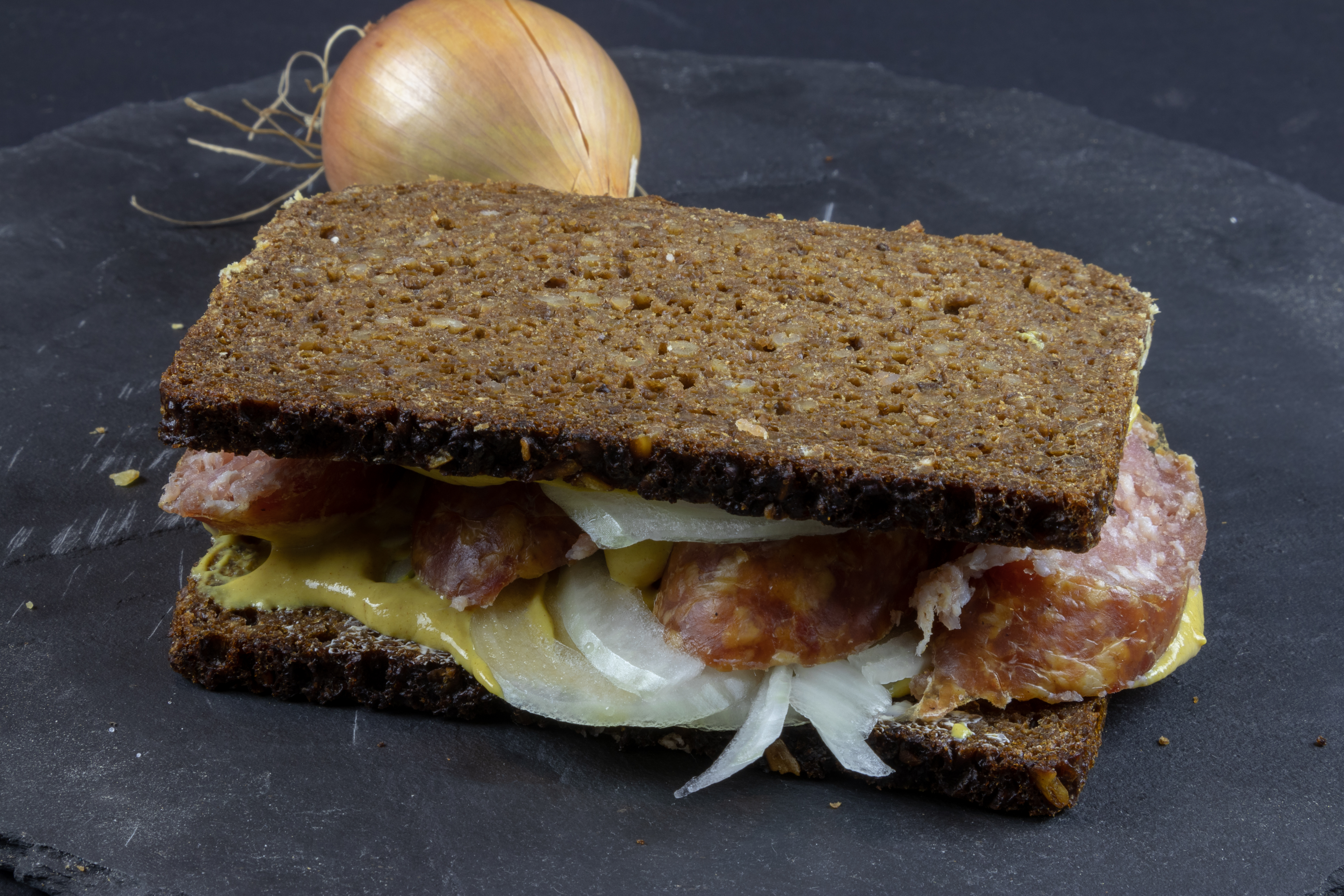
- Type: Sandwich
- Place of origin: Germany
- Region or state: Rhineland
- Main ingredients: Brown bread, butter, smoked pork sausage, onion rings and spread with spicy mustard

Kottenbutter or Kottenbotter is a sandwich consisting of buttered brown bread or Mischbrot, smoked pork sausage ("Mettwurst"), onion rings and a spread of spicy mustard. Other variants supplement pork with horse meat ("Kottenwurst") or Balkenbrij. The sandwich is common in the Bergisches Land region of Germany, in the state of North Rhine-Westphalia.

== Origin and nomenclature ==
This local, rustic specialty was the common lunch of the metal workers along the Wupper river in Remscheid, Wuppertal and particularly Solingen, who used grinding wheels powered by the river to sharpen knife blades and to deburr steel blanks. As self-employed subcontractors for larger companies in the city centres, they had to grind the steelware blanks under time pressure. Despite the strenuous and hazardous work on the large grindstone (pneumoconiosis and injuries from the driving belt), a two-man operation could not afford a proper meal, so the sandwich was invented as a quick meal that was still plentiful in calories.

As the workers lived and worked in grinding houses, similar to cottages (German: Kotten), the sandwich was named after them.

== Relevance today ==
The Kottenbutter still appears on lists today of specialties in the Bergisches Land and is sometimes eaten at special, inaugural events. It also features as part of a "Kaffeetafel" meeting, where a local group will gather and enjoy tea or coffee with Kottenbutter. In August 2021, the Solinger Tageblatt even suggested that offerings of Kottenbutter could be an effective method for encouraging the elderly population to take the Pfizer–BioNTech COVID-19 vaccine.

On the occasion of 100th anniversary of the construction of the Lüttringhausen town hall, a local butcher's and baker's collaborated to create a 32m (105ft) long Kottenbutter for a local fête.
