= Guajolota =

Form of street food made with a tamal

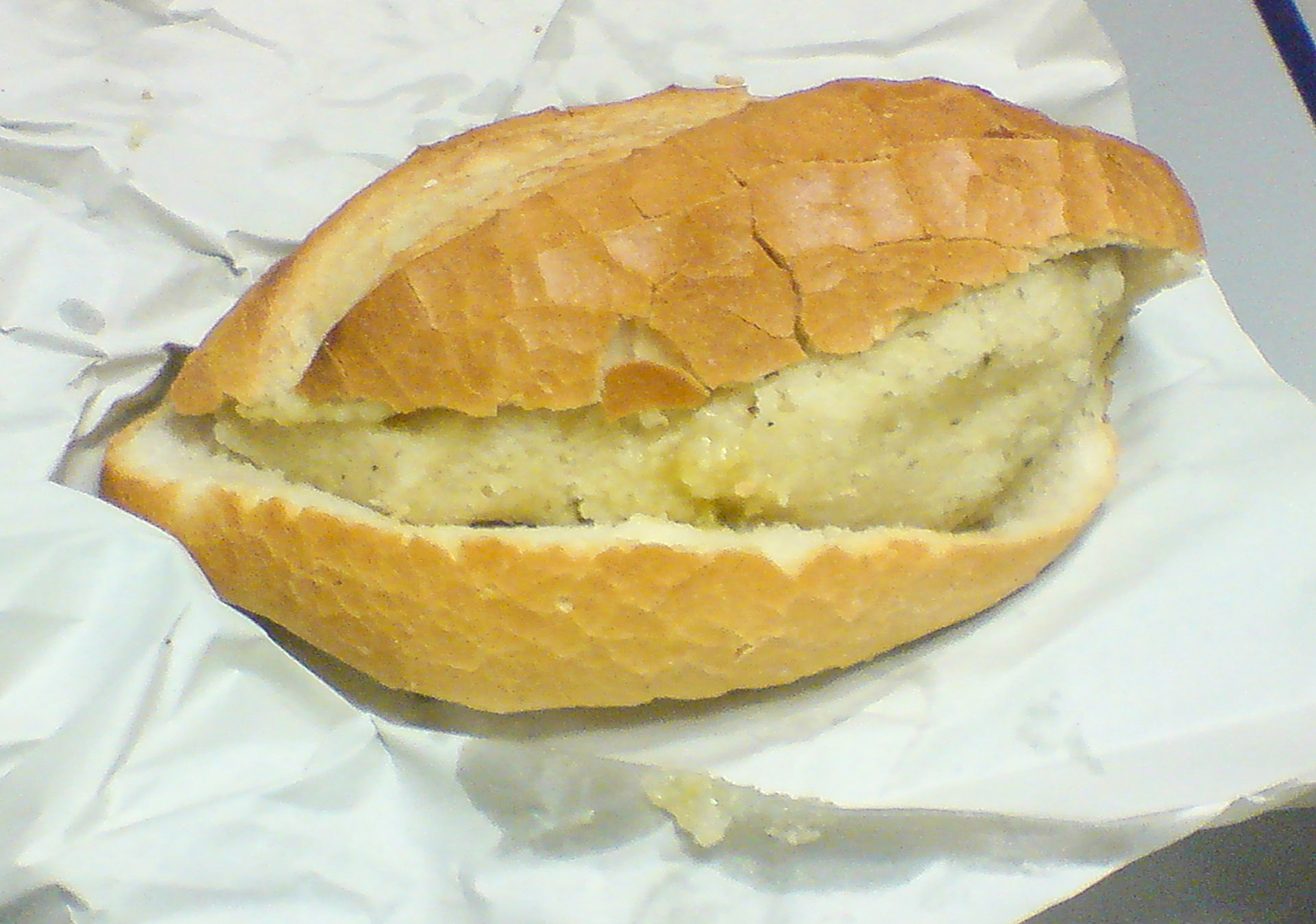
- Type: Sandwich
- Place of origin: Mexico
- Region or state: Mexico City
- Main ingredients: Bolillo or telera, tamal

Guajolota (Spanish: [ɡwaxoˈlota]), also known as a torta de tamal, is a form of street food commonly found in Mexico City and within the State of Mexico. It is essentially a sandwich composed of a tamal placed inside a bolillo or a telera, which is a rounder version of a bolillo.

Vendors are commonly found selling tortas de tamal throughout the day near offices, markets, schools, and especially near churches on Sunday mornings. Most vendors sell a variety of tamales stuffed with different ingredients, such as red mole with chicken, salsa verde with pork, cheese and chile poblano "rajas con queso," or a "tamal de dulce," which is a sweet flavored tamal, to accompany the bolillo.

Guajolotas are frequently bought with a hot drink known as atole, which comes in a variety of flavors. The order of a guajolota and atole are also known in Mexico City as a "guajolocombo."

The term guajolota is the feminized version of the word guajolote, which originates from the Nahuatl word huexolotl or uexolotl, for turkey.

There are different types of tamales that can be used to fill a guajolota:

- Green tamale
- Oaxacan tamale
- Sweet tamale
- Tamal de rajas
- Fried tamale
- Mole tamale

== Origin ==
There are several theories about the origin of the name "guajolota". Some attribute it to the barley and rounded shape similar to the breast of a guajolote (a variety of turkey consumed in Mexico).6 Also, since it is a highly caloric snack (between 800 and 1000 calories4), those who eat it are told that it will "fatten them up like a guajolote".6 Other sources affirm that its name comes from a type of low-quality bread that was used to prepare it, also called "guajolote".

In his book La cultura del antojito. De tacos, tamales y tortas (2013), Mexican historian José N. Iturriaga explains that guajolota was born in the city of Puebla at least two centuries ago,8 and that this original recipe differs slightly from the current guajolota, since it used "bazo" bread and was filled with a red enchilada (dried red chiles) and shredded pork meat. Over time, the recipe was transferred to the Mexican capital and the ingredients were substituted, while in Puebla the original was kept and eventually lost.

== See also ==
- List of sandwiches
- Tamale
- Mexico
