= Gilgeori toast =

South Korean street food sandwich

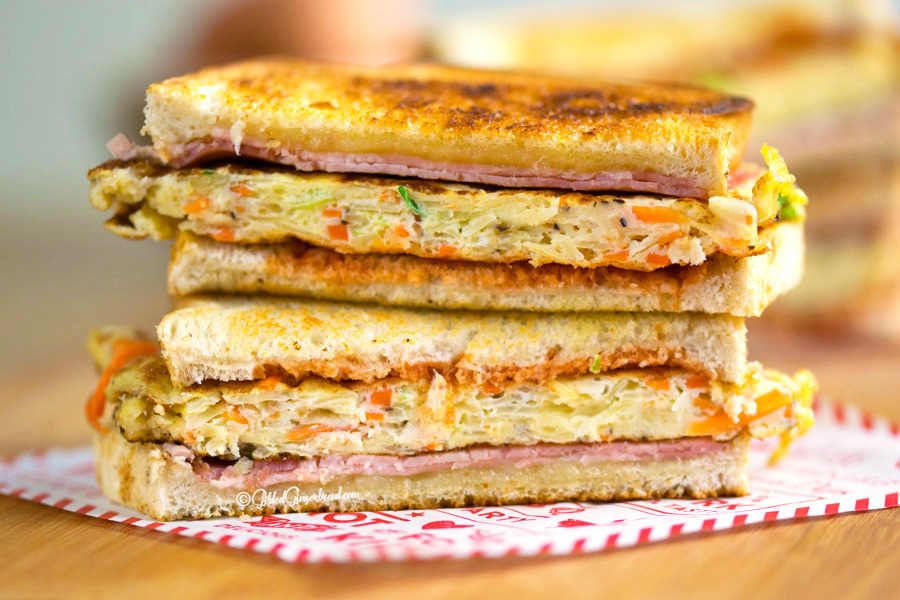
- Type: Egg sandwich
- Associated cuisine: South Korean cuisine

Gilgeori toast (Korean: 길거리 토스트; lit. street toast) is a South Korean street food sandwich. It consists of a fried egg (typically in a square shape), thinly sliced cabbage, ham, and cheese between two pieces of toast. Other possible ingredients include onions, green onions, carrots, ketchup, sugar. The dish has been sold outside of South Korea before.
