= Camel rider =

Sandwich

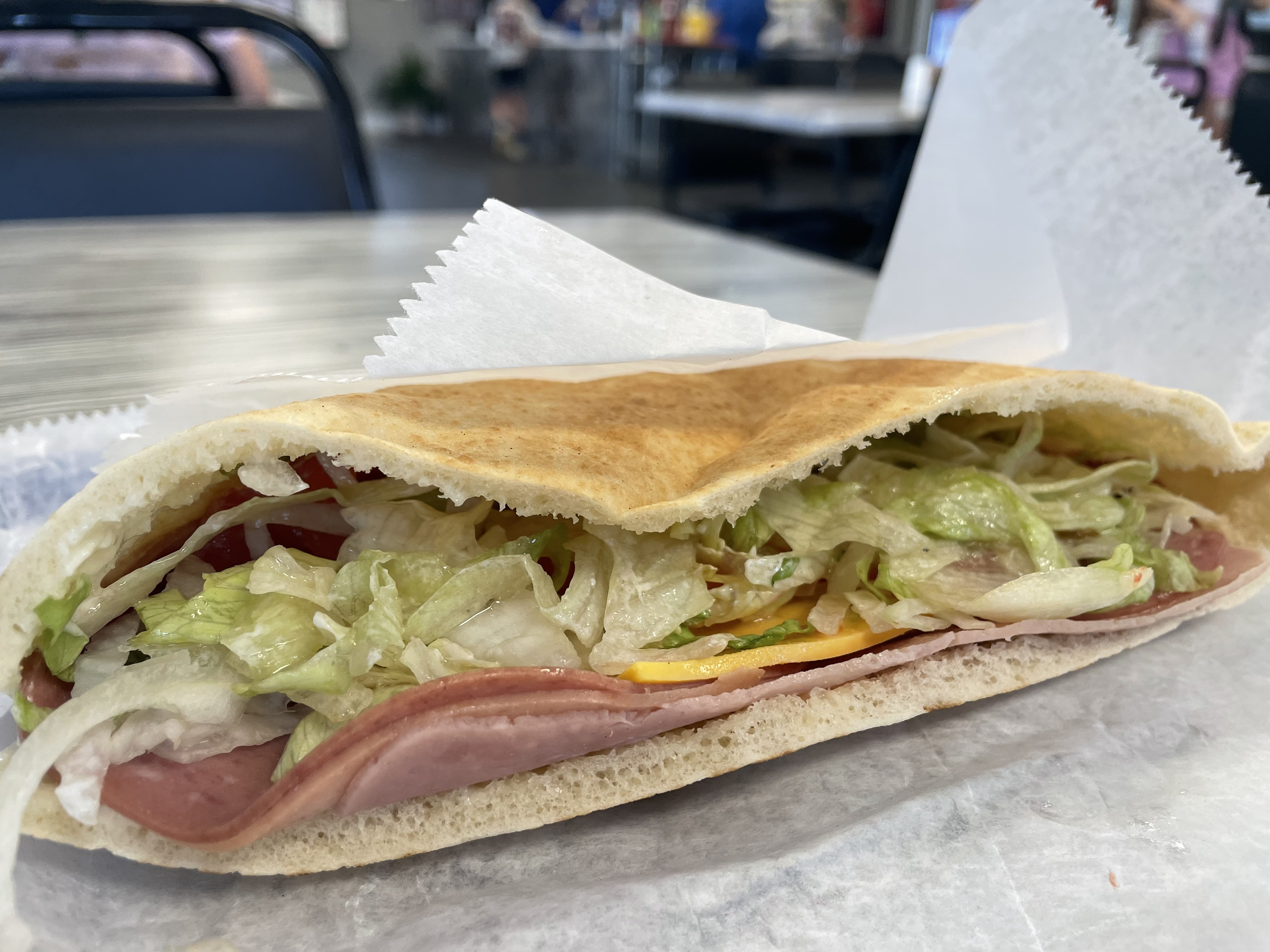
- Camel rider
- Alternative names: Desert rider
- Type: Sandwich
- Course: Main dish
- Place of origin: United States
- Region or state: Jacksonville, Florida
- Main ingredients: Lunch meat, Italian dressing, pita bread
- Variations: Shrimp rider, veggie rider, and steak-in-a-sack

The camel rider or desert rider is a type of sandwich that is popular in Jacksonville, Florida. The sandwich is usually made with lunch meats, Italian dressing, and pita bread. It is often served with tabbouleh and cherry limeade.

The camel rider is a product of Arab immigrants who first settled in the Jacksonville area in the 1890s. Since then, Jacksonville has had a large Middle Eastern population. It became popular in Jacksonville in the 1960s. The Arab immigrants would have grocery stores in predominantly African-American neighborhoods where they would sell the dish. Although the exact origins are unclear, it is often traced to Joe Assi, a Lebanese-born baker, who owned the Gold Room restaurant where he served the dish. In the 1970s, it continued to grow in popularity and was served in restaurants like The Sheik, Desert Rider, and Pinegrove Market & Deli. During the early years of its popularity, pita bread was considered a novelty locally. Some locals refer to the pita bread as Arabic bread or Syrian bread as a nod to the origins of some of the bakers.

The name camel rider was initially pejorative but has since been accepted by the Arabic producers and local consumers. Nevertheless, some have avoided the term or created variations, such as the shrimp rider, veggie rider, and steak-in-a-sack. One popular breakfast variation served at The Sheik is pita stuffed with eggs and sausage and served with grits. It can be found in other parts of the country such as Columbus, Georgia or Birmingham, Alabama, but remains most readily available in Jacksonville. More than 50 restaurants in Jacksonville serve the dish.
