= Kumru (sandwich) =

Turkish sandwich

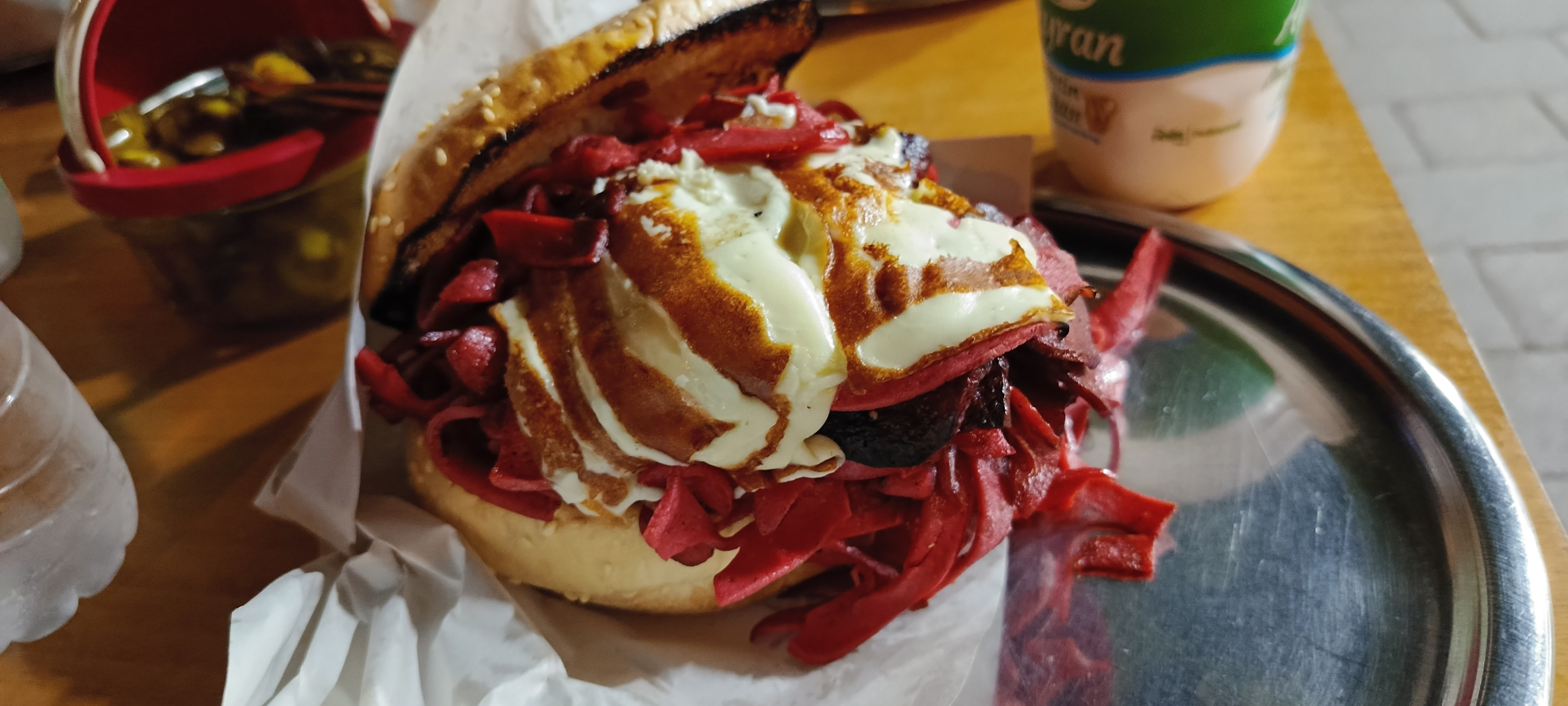
Kumru

Kumru is a Turkish sandwich on a bun, typically with cheese, tomato, and sucuk, a spicy sausage, often served as street food. The bread is soft, and is made by some local bakeries and restaurants with the addition of chickpea sourdough. Some kumru vendors also serve it with pickled cucumbers, hot pepper, mayonnaise and ketchup. The name translates as "collared dove" and derives from the shape of the sandwich. The original kumru was ring-shaped and covered with sesame seeds. The modern sandwich appeared in the mid-20th century in İzmir, and soon became very popular.

== See also ==
- Pogacha
