= Combination meal =

Type of meal that typically includes food items and a beverage

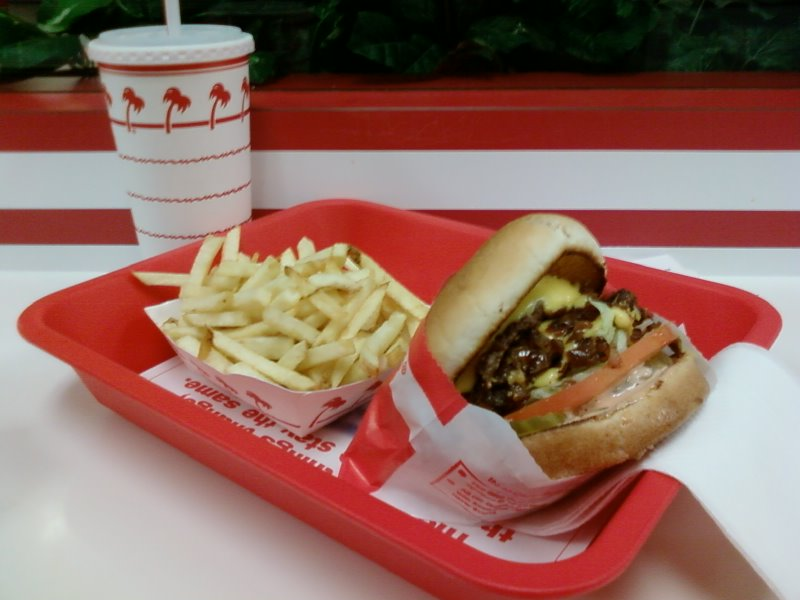
An example of foods served as a fast food combination meal

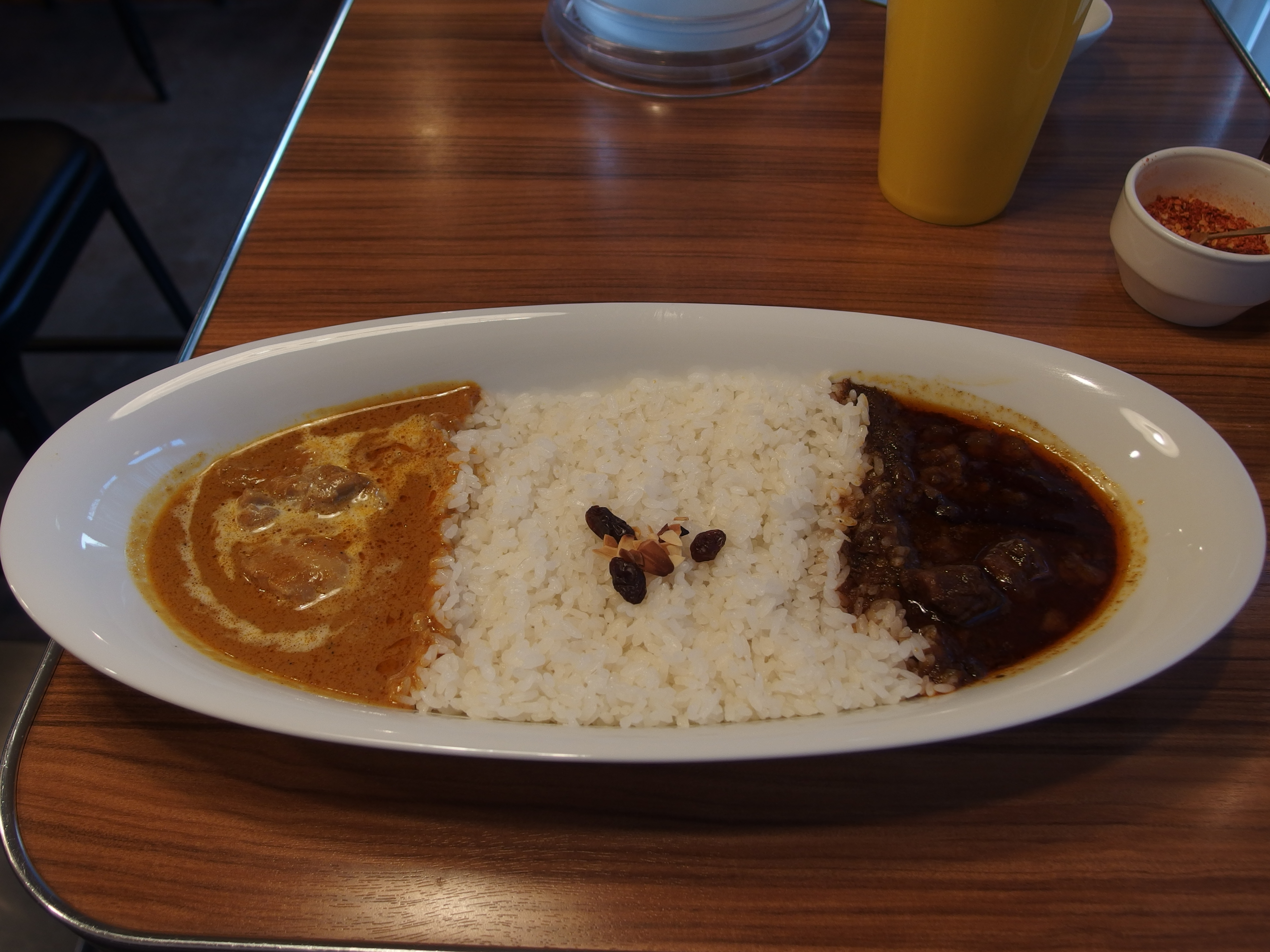
A combination meal with chicken curry, rice and beef curry

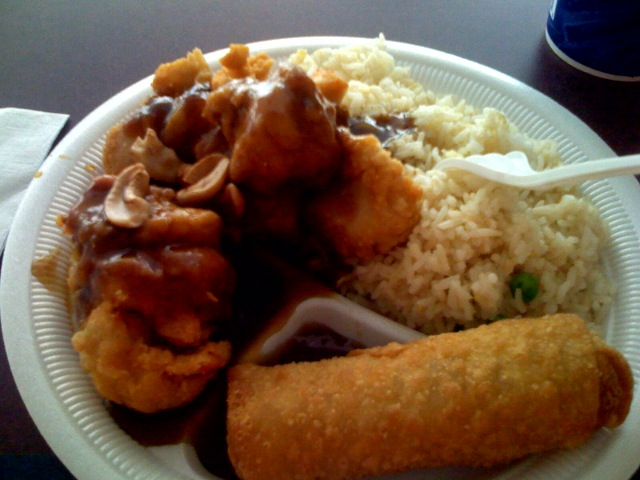
An American Chinese cuisine combination meal, consisting of cashew chicken, fried rice, and an egg roll

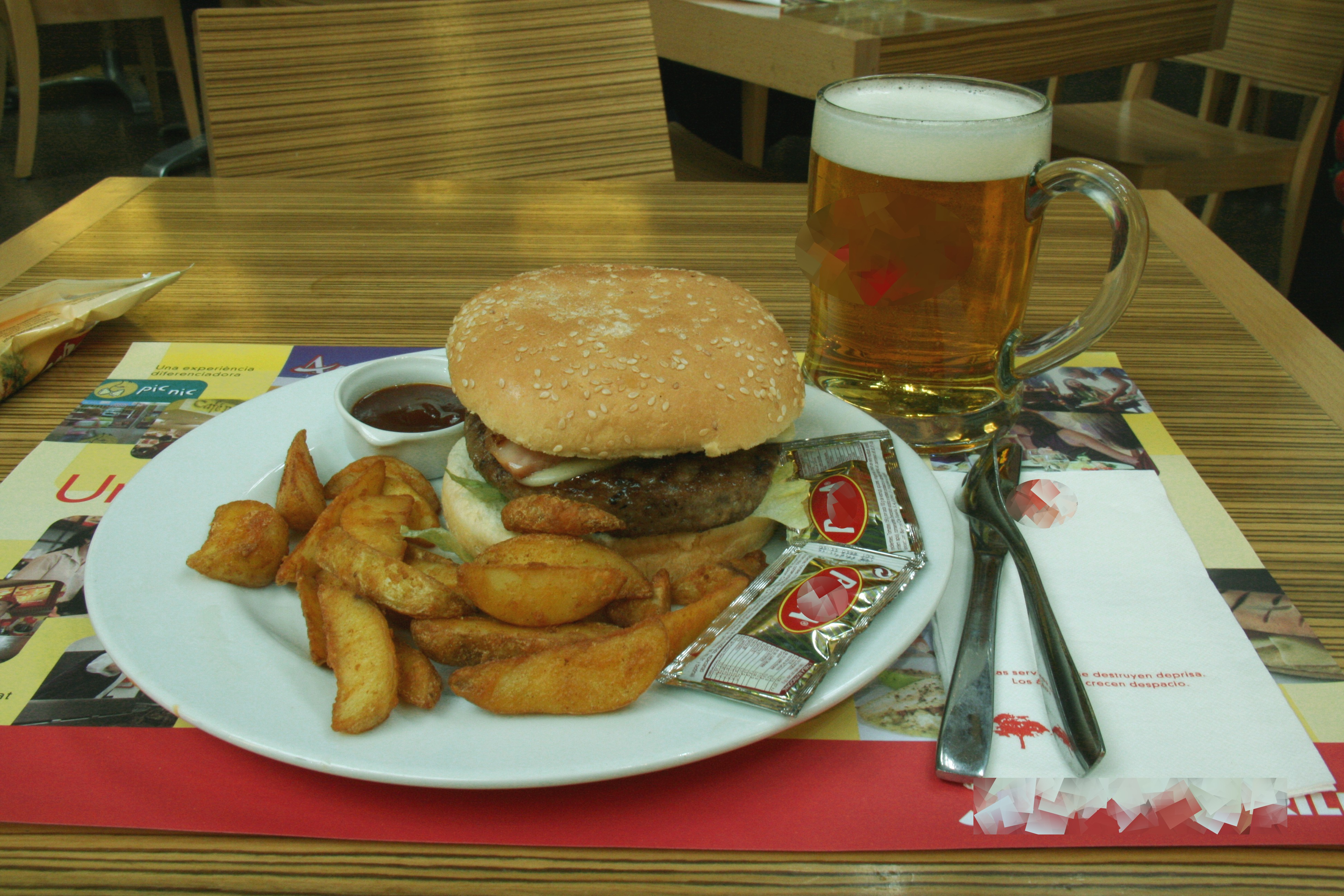
A Spanish combination meal, consisting of a hamburger, potato wedges and a beer

A combination meal, often referred as a combo meal, is a type of meal that typically includes food items and a beverage. They are a common menu item at fast food restaurants, and other restaurants also purvey them. Combination meals may be priced lower compared to ordering items separately, but this is not always the case. A combination meal is also a meal in which the consumer orders items à la carte to create their own meal combination.

The casado is a common type of lunch combination meal in Costa Rica and Panama.

== Overview ==
Fast food combination meals typically include a main item (called entrée in American English, but not usually in French) such as a hamburger, a side dish such as fries, and a beverage such as a soft drink. Other types of restaurants, such as fast-casual restaurants also offer combination meals.

Combination meals may be priced lower compared to ordering the same items separately, and this lower pricing may serve to entice consumers that are budget-minded. A 2010 study published in the Journal of Public Policy & Marketing found that some consumers may order a combination meal even if no price discount is applied compared to the price of ordering items separately. The study found that this behavior is based upon consumers perceiving an inherent value in combination meals, and also suggested that the ease and convenience of ordering, such as ordering a meal by number, plays a role compared to ordering items separately. This study also found that the presence of combination meals encourages consumers to increase meal portion size by supersizing their meals.

A combination meal can also comprise a meal in which separate dishes are selected by consumers from an entire menu, and can include à la carte selections that are combined on a plate. A fast food combination meal can contain over 1,300 calories (5,400 kJ). Fast food restaurants sometimes offer a means to order larger portions of food within the format of the combination meal, such as supersizing.

== History ==
In the United States in the early 1930s, the combination meal was a popular dish in restaurants and in homes. (Note: "The "combination" meal is popular in many homes as well as in commercial eating places. Some foreign dishes are favorite "combination" meals; for example, Mexican tortillas and enchiladas, Spanish rice, chop suey and Hungarian goulash.")

== In Latin America ==
In Costa Rican and Panamanian cuisine, a combination meal is referred to as a casado, which means "married". It is a typical lunch dish in both countries. In Costa Rica, a casado typically consists of a meat dish, rice and beans, and deli salads. Additional foods comprising the Costa Rican casado can include fried plantain, noodles and tomatoes. In Costa Rica, the term plato del día (plate of the day) is frequently used interchangeably with the term casado.

In Panama, a casado typically consists of an entree, rice and beans, and cabbage. In Panama, the plato executive, which means "executive plate", is a prix fixe (fixed price) lunch menu offered in some upscale restaurants that is similar in concept to the casado.

== In Spain ==
The Spanish version of the combination meal, known as plato combinado, is a staple in bars and restaurants across the country. These meals are popular as they are affordable and can be quickly cooked to order. They often consist of a main (meat, e.g. grilled steak, hamburgers or breaded cutlets; seafood, e.g. fried calamari or grilled squid; fish, battered or grilled; or other fried foods, such as croquettes), a side dish of salad or French fries (in some cases, mixed vegetables or peas), and a fried egg.

The meals date back to the Spanish Civil War. During that period, the Francoist dictatorship introduced a single-course day (Día del Plato Único), which initially took place every fortnight and then each Friday, in order to support the war effort. However, most upscale restaurants circumvented the rule by increasing serving sizes or using ingredients in short supply, such as seafood, fish or fresh eggs. In its current iteration, the plato combinado was designed to cater to the increasing number of tourists during the Spanish miracle. To do so, the meals and their prices were normalised; in this way, the offerings would be consistent across the country. As the meal sets were not popular with tourists, the government began to promote them amongst the local population, where they were well received. This could be explained by their association with American-style diners, which were fashionable in the 1950s and 1960s.

Despite their popularity, the plato combinado is often seen as unhealthy and outdated. This is due to the cooking techniques used, as many of the products are deep-fried. In addition, many of the products used tend to be lacking in quality, as they are mostly frozen. In this sense, the fare is similar to that served in cafés or greasy spoons in the United States and the United Kingdom.

== In the United Kingdom ==
In the United Kingdom, a popular combination meal offered in restaurants and grocery stores is a sales promotion known as a meal deal. Grocery store meal deals usually consist of three items: a main (often a sandwich or salad box), a drink, and a snack (commonly potato chips, fruit or confectionery). Meal deals are primarily eaten at lunchtime, and more than a third of Britons buy one at least once per week.

== See also ==
- British meal deals
- Blue-plate special
- List of restaurant terminology
- Meat and three
- Plate lunch
- Soup and sandwich
- Value meal
