= Jam sandwich =

Jam sandwich may refer to:

- Jam sandwich (food), a food item made from bread and jam
- Jam sandwich (police car), British slang for one style of police vehicle
