= Meal deal =

Main, drink and snack, often sold in UK supermarkets

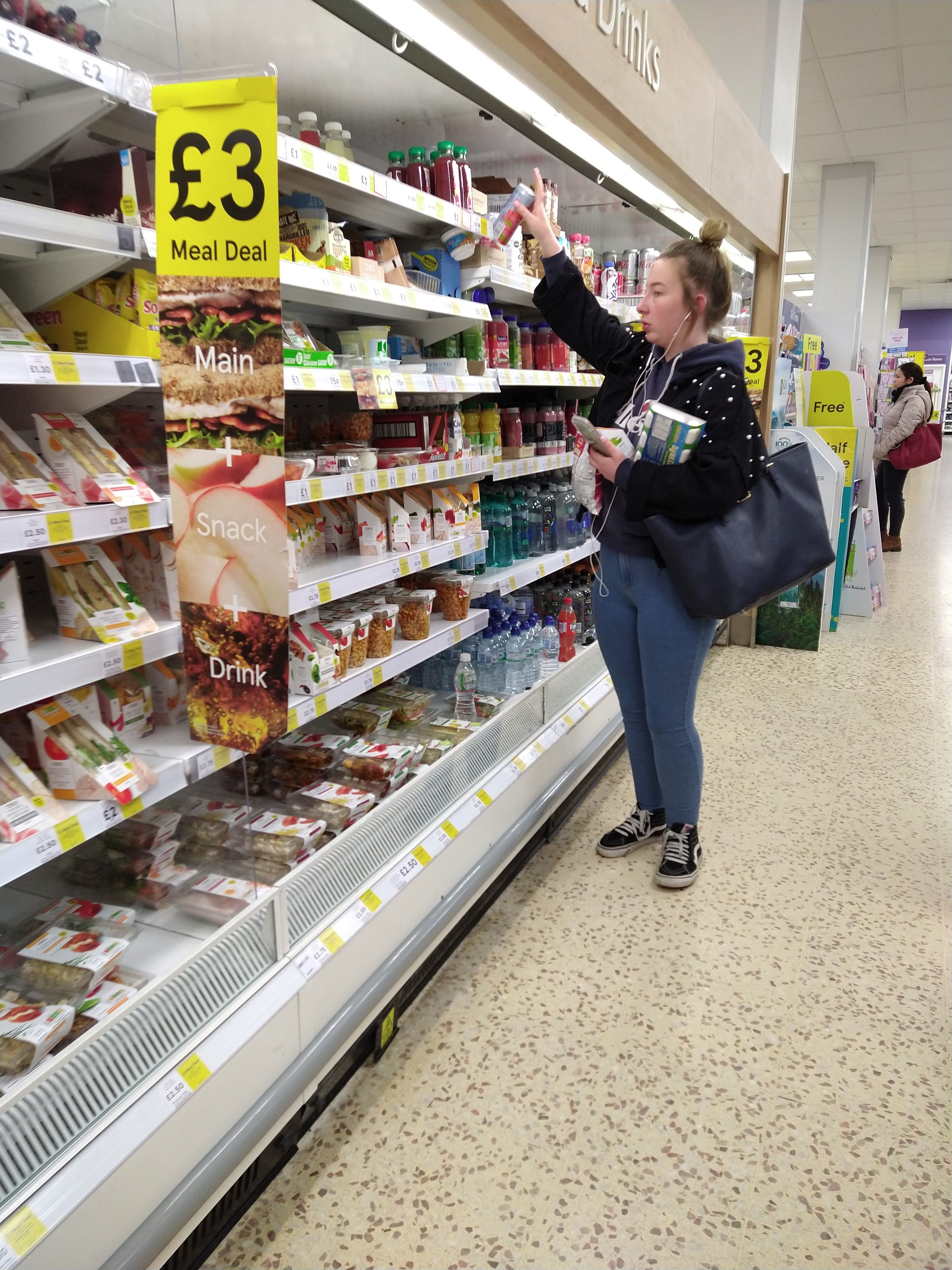
A meal deal aisle in Tesco

In the United Kingdom, a meal deal is a sales promotion which consists of three items: a main (often a sandwich or salad box), a drink, and a snack (commonly crisps, fruit or confectionery). Meal deals are primarily eaten at lunchtime, and more than a third of Britons buy one at least once per week. Over 7 million are sold every weekday.

As of 2022, 23% of lunch meal deals exceeded the UK government's 600 kcal guideline, and on average contained 10% more calories (based on a survey of options available at five shops).

== Contents and food types ==
Meal deals are sold by a variety of retailers such as supermarkets, convenience shops, cafés and bakery chains. Many retailers offer a selection of types of mains, such as pasta salads, sushi and wraps which tend to come in a variety of toppings or fillings, as well as ready-made sandwiches. Supermarkets generally offer the widest variety of meal deals, with Sainsbury's offering over 500 products in their range, and Tesco offering over 10 million possible combinations. They tend to be served cold in supermarkets, but some cafés such as Costa offer hot options. Snacks offered by many retailers include sausage rolls, pork pies and fresh fruit.

== Prices ==
Meal deals vary in price depending on retailer, with most costing a set price between £3 and £6 as of 2025. Prices have increased rapidly in recent years: the average price of a meal deal (from retailers across the market) was £4.12 in 2022, up from £3.91 in 2020.

The price saving offered by a meal deal, compared to purchasing the three items separately, can be over 50%. In 2019, a court ruled that a "free" bottle of wine included in a Marks & Spencer meal deal costing £12 is not free for the purpose of calculating alcohol duties.

== History and culture ==
Pharmacy Boots pioneered the meal deal in 1999, after establishing the first systemised sandwich production in 1985, which enabled the sale of the same sandwiches in all its branches. The meal deal is regarded as a staple in British culture, being typically associated with convenience and value for money, comparable to regular meal sets offered at cha chaan tengs in Hong Kong.

In the United States, the term "meal deal" is used by fast food chains such as Dairy Queen and Hardee's to market sales promotions for combos with a main, a drink and French fries, often with smaller portion size than their full-sized combo meals.

== Economic performance ==
Sales of shop-bought sandwiches and meal deals declined amidst the COVID-19 pandemic in the United Kingdom, as more people worked from home, resulting in fewer people in city centres. Their sales rebounded in early 2022 after the lifting of lockdown restrictions in England and the easing of travel restrictions. Sales of meal deals have grown amidst the 2021–present United Kingdom cost of living crisis, contributing to bakery chain Greggs reporting a growth in sales of nearly 15% as of October 2022.

== Restrictions ==
On 27 June 2023, the Welsh Government announced plans to introduce legislation that would restrict meal deals in Wales involving meals high in fat, sugar and salt. The legislation, designed to tackle instances of type 2 diabetes and obesity, would be introduced in 2024 and implemented in 2025. Retailers expressed concern in response to the announcement, particularly in light of high food prices, while charities representing people with eating disorders suggested the plans could have a negative effect on those in recovery.

== See also ==
- British Rail sandwich
