= British Rail sandwich =

Sandwiches sold in Britain, 1948–1994

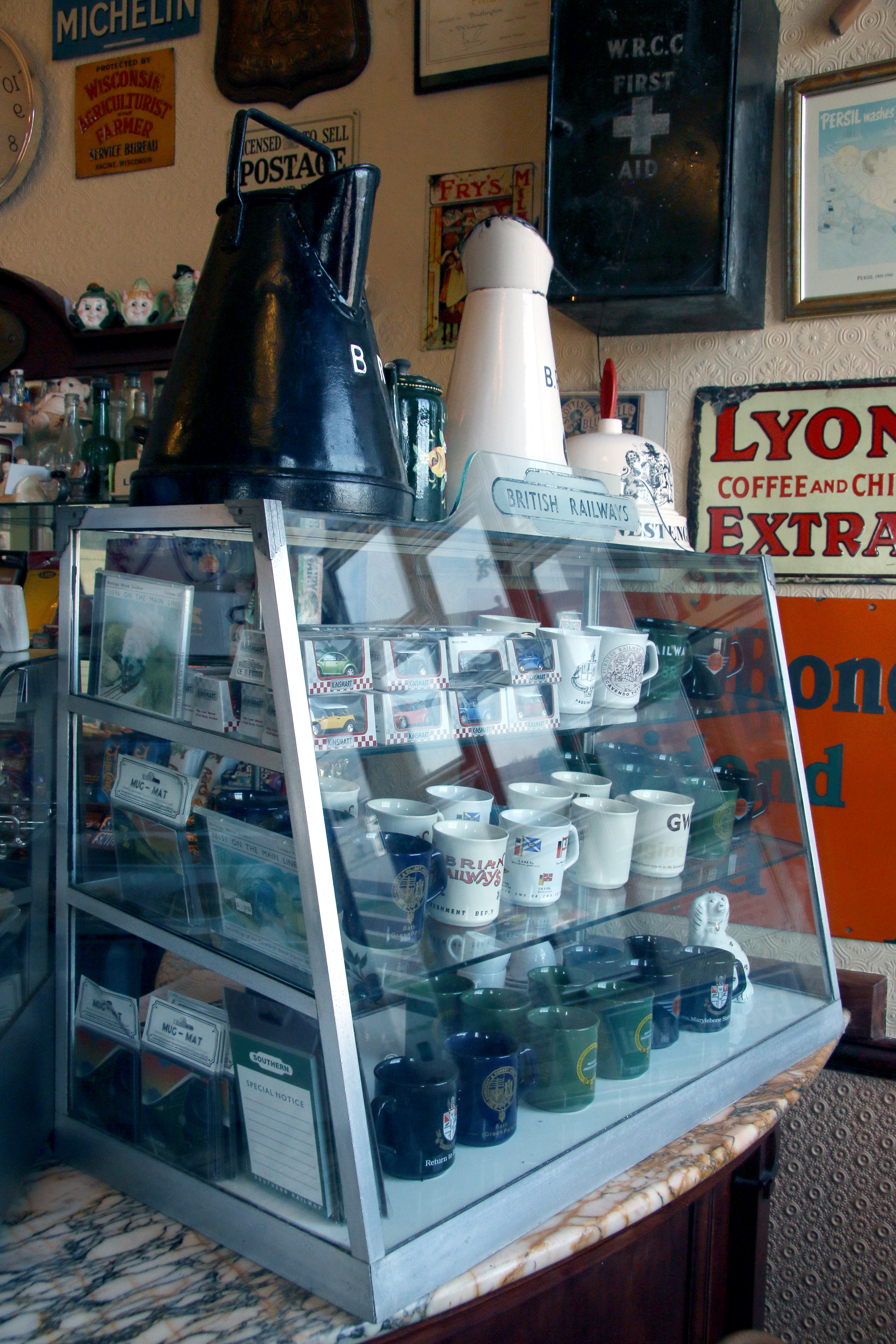
British Railways sandwich and cake display unit at Bridlington Railway Station buffet

A British Rail sandwich in British popular culture was the complimentary sandwich sold for consumption on passenger trains of the former British Rail (BR), during the period of nationalisation from 1948 to 1997. Comedic references to the sandwich established it as emblematic of the unappetising fare then available aboard Great Britain's railway service.

According to former BR caterer Myrna Tuddenham, the poor reputation of BR sandwiches likely derived from the practice of keeping the sandwiches "under glass domes on the counters in refreshment rooms until the corners turned up". Despite the many jokes at its expense, British Rail documents show that in 1993, its last full year as a public company, eight million sandwiches were sold. Historian Keith Lovegrove wrote that it was "a sandwich of contradictions; it could be cold and soggy, or stale and hard, and the corners of the isosceles triangle-shaped bread would often curl up like the pages of a well-thumbed paperback".

== References in news and popular culture ==
The quality of food served on trains or at railway stations was a source of amusement long before the advent of British Rail, as evidenced by a humorous column in the October 1884 edition of the American Railroad Journal:

The existence of the railway sandwich and its spread throughout the country has long been a source of terror to the people and of anxiety to the medical fraternity who have been able to cope with it successfully.

The British Rail sandwich was often ridiculed on British radio and television and in numerous books. An episode of The Goon Show entitled "The Collapse of the British Railway Sandwich System" was first broadcast on the BBC Home Service on 8 March 1954. In 1972, the show Milligna (or Your Favourite Spike) included spoof news items, including "Long-missing Van Gogh ear found in a British Rail sandwich".

In his book Queuing for Beginners: The Story of Daily Life From Breakfast to Bedtime, Joe Moran describes the British Rail sandwich as "a metaphor for social decline since it became a running joke on The Goon Show". Bill Bryson wrote in Notes from a Small Island: "I can remember when you couldn't buy a British Rail sandwich without wondering if this was your last act before a long period on a life-support machine."

The British Rail sandwich has been used as a negative point of comparison for other ready-to-serve meals, especially regarding transport in the United Kingdom, and representative of the negative effects of British nationalisation of industry in the middle of the 20th century. A 1997 article in The Independent referred to the sandwich as "an indictment of statist, bureaucratic corporations" privatised by Prime Minister Margaret Thatcher, who had "swept aside James Callaghan, prices and incomes policies and the British Rail sandwich".

It has also been used as a negative point of comparison for poor service in general. In 1988, Investors Chronicle described British Telecom's quality of service as "attracting the sort of public abuse once reserved for the British Rail sandwich". In 2007, Sir Michael Bishop, then chairman of airline BMI, wrote that Heathrow Airport "now has the reputation formerly held by the British Rail sandwich".

== Sandwich recipe ==
In 2001, the National Railway Museum in York discovered a November 1971 document featuring sandwich recipes, issued by Director of Rail Catering Bill Currie. The document states its aim to make BR meals "the best on the track" and describes the precise amount of sandwich filling to be placed on the sandwich. The recipe also specifies, in order to make the sandwiches attractive – and to be able to tell what was inside – at least a third of the filling be placed in the centre, so that when cut diagonally, the customer would see the contents. For luncheon meat and sardines, the filling should total two-thirds of an ounce of meat. On an egg and cress sandwich, each sandwich was to contain one-twelfth of a punnet of cress. The document was featured in a 2002 exhibition of the National Railway Museum, "British Rail – A Moving Story". A typical ham sandwich would contain one slice of ham with another slice folded in half and placed diagonally over the first one. When the sandwich was cut diagonally, it would appear to contain three slices of ham instead of two.

== In other countries ==
In France, this kind of unappetising sandwich is named "sandwich SNCF" or "sandwich TGV", by assimilation with the quality of sandwiches sold in French trains, especially high-speed trains. In popular humour, this name refers to any bad, meagre and expensive ready-to-eat food. Since 1 March 2009, sandwiches sold onboard TGVs have become cheaper.

In Greece, poor-quality offerings are called Καραβίσια (karavisia) or καραβίσιος καφές (literally "lobster coffee"), an idiomatic term which translates roughly to "something that is on a ship"; it refers to low-quality (but very expensive) offerings such as those sold on passenger ships.

== See also ==
- List of sandwiches
- Meal deal
- Travellers Fare
- Ekiben
