= Soup and sandwich =

Combination meal of a soup and a sandwich popular in the United States

A grilled cheese sandwich with tomato soup

The soup and sandwich combination meal consists of a soup accompanied by a sandwich. It has been a popular meal in the United States since the 1920s. Some U.S. restaurant chains specialize in the meal, and it has been mass-produced as a prepared frozen meal.

== Overview ==
The soup and sandwich combination meal is common in the United States. Depending on the intended size of the meal, the sandwich might be either half or a whole sandwich, and the soup may be served in either a cup or bowl. The combination of a grilled cheese sandwich with tomato soup is a common example in American cuisine, and has been described as a comfort food.

== History ==
The soup and sandwich combination became a popular lunch dish in the United States in the 1920s, and remains as a common dish at American luncheonettes and diners. It was also a common lunch dish in some earlier U.S. department stores that had dining rooms. In contemporary times, it is sometimes consumed as a light dinner. Some soup kitchens, outreach organizations and churches routinely provide the dish to the needy.

== Restaurants ==
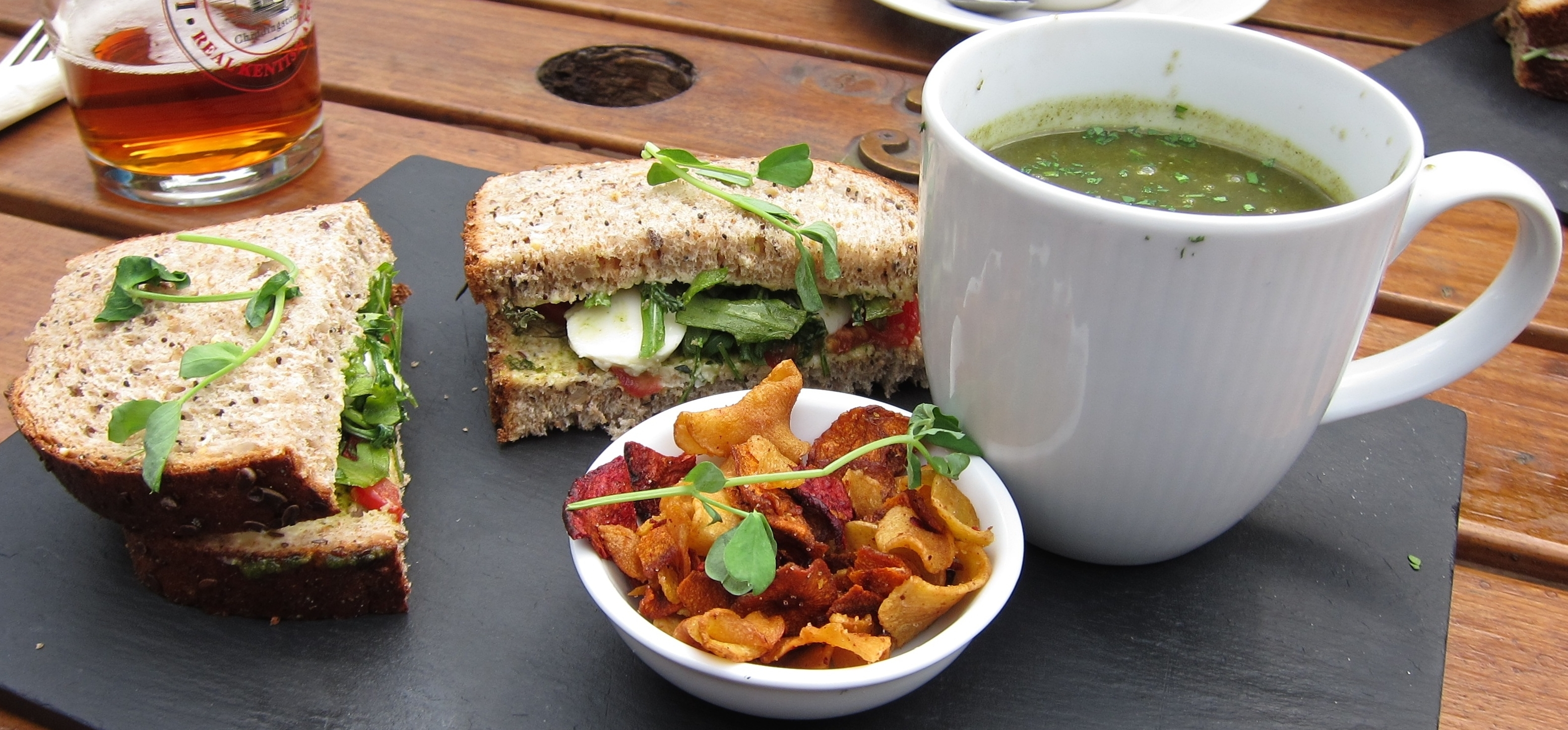
A soup and sandwich meal, served with chips

Some American restaurants specialize in soup and sandwich meals, such as the Panera Bread Company, Hale and Hearty, and Zoup! restaurant chains. In September 2016, the fast casual restaurant Panera Bread had a total of 2,024 stores at North American locations, some of which go by different company names. Panera plans to expand its product delivery availability, which began in early 2016, to include 35% to 40% of its store locations by the end of 2017. In October 2016, Zoup! has a total of 96 stores in the United States, with 93 franchise stores and three company-owned ones.

== Prepared meals ==
The soup and sandwich combination has been mass-produced in the United States and purveyed to consumers on a national level, the Campbell's Souper Combo frozen soup and sandwich meal being one example. Initially, the product realized promising sales revenues, but consumer interest later tapered off, with the initial high sales attributed to consumer curiosity about the new product and "one-off" purchases per this initial interest. The Souper Combo was a short-lived product, and was eventually discontinued.

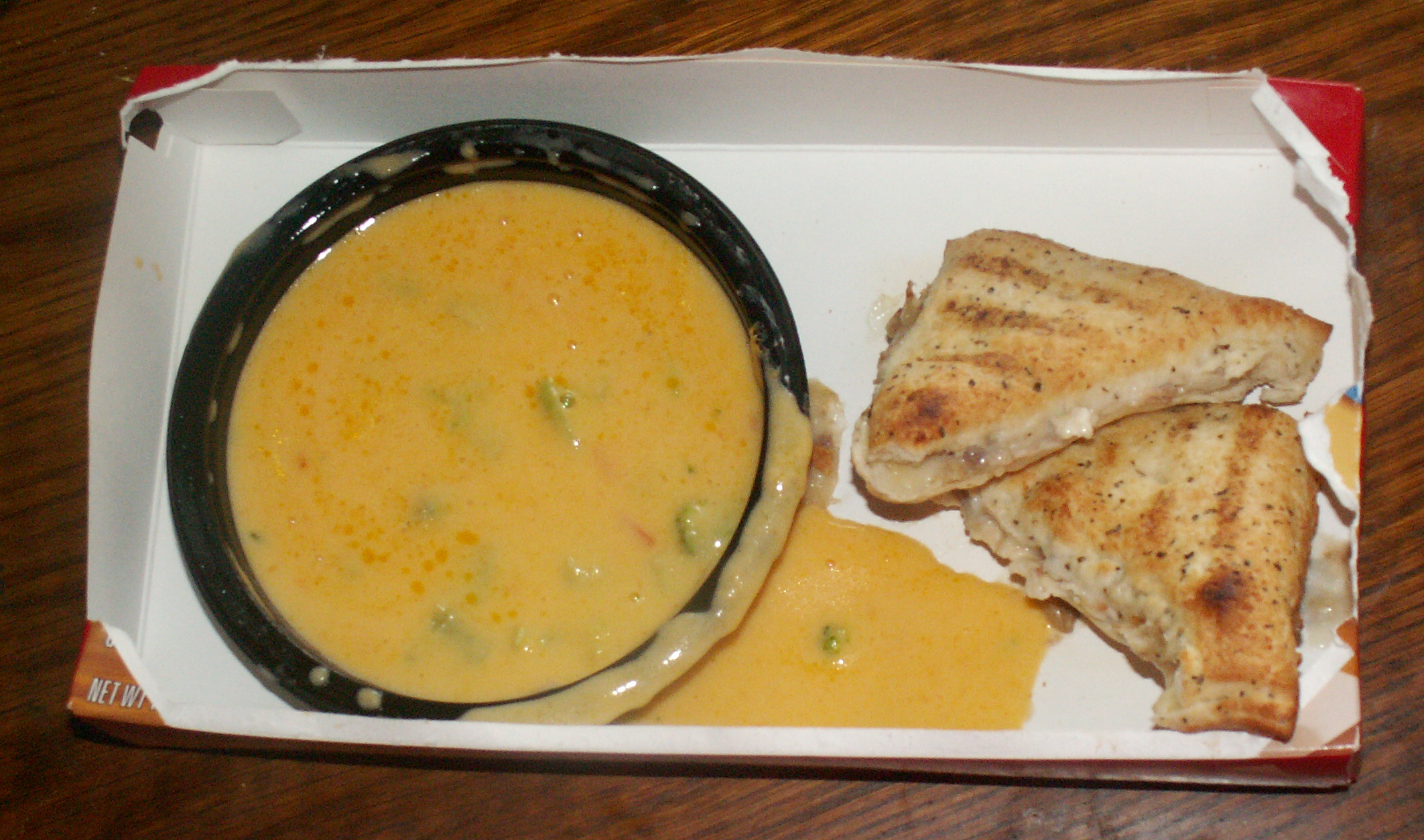
A Stouffer's frozen prepared soup and sandwich meal after heating

The Corner Bistro is a line of mass-produced frozen prepared soup and sandwich meals marketed under the Stouffer's brand. The sandwiches are manufactured as stuffed melt sandwiches.

== See also ==
- List of sandwiches
- List of soups
- Soup and salad
