= Jam sandwich (food) =

Two slices of bread with jam (or jelly) in the middle

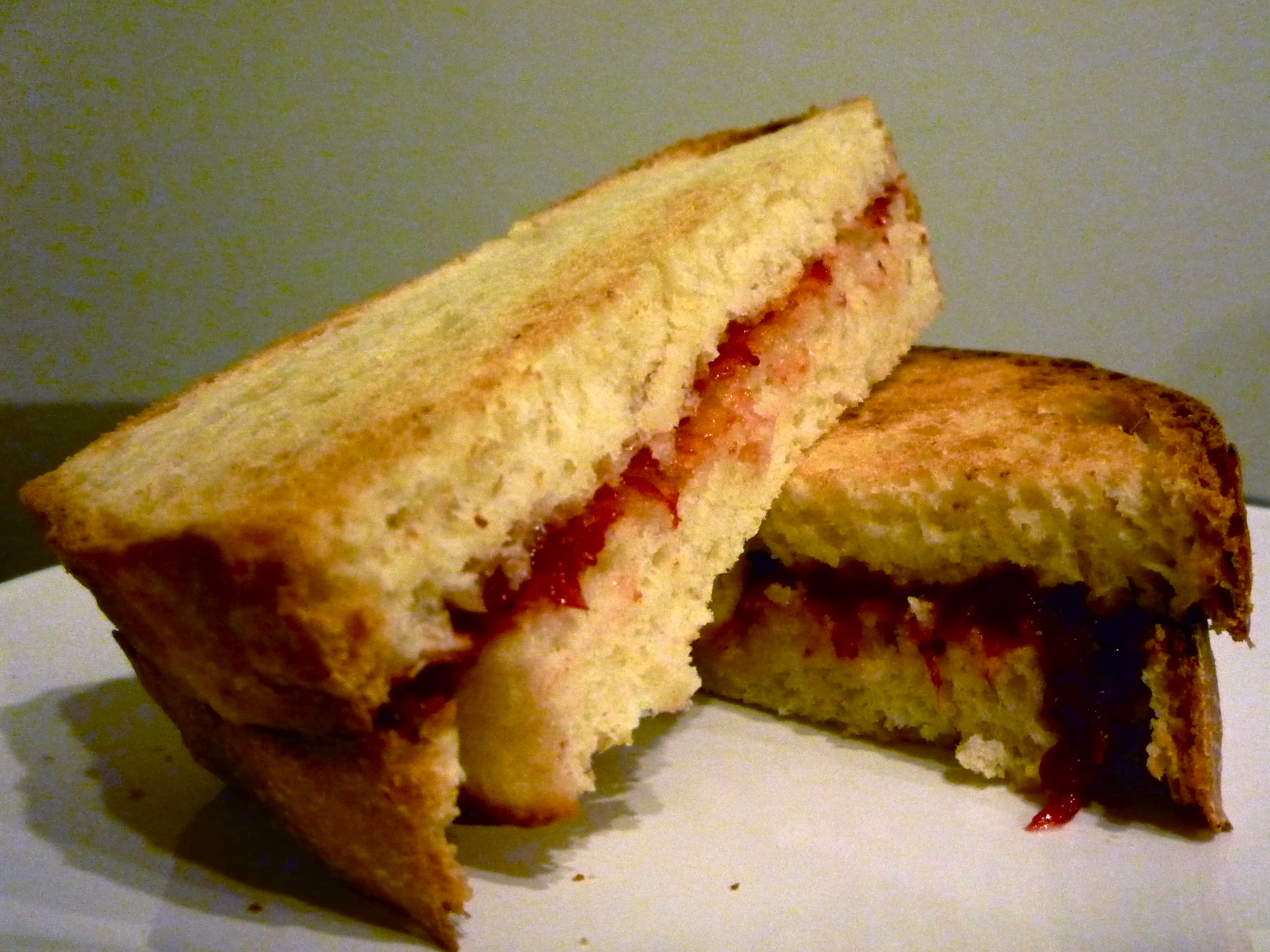
- A toasted strawberry jam sandwich
- Type: Sandwich
- Course: Lunch or snack
- Place of origin: United Kingdom
- Main ingredients: Sliced bread, jam

A jam sandwich is usually composed of two slices of bread with jam (or jelly) in the middle. It is normally consumed at lunchtime or as a snack. In Scotland, they are also known as pieces and jam, or jelly pieces.

If another spread is added, particularly peanut butter, it becomes a variation of the peanut butter and jelly sandwich.

== Origin ==
Jam sandwiches are thought to have originated around the 19th century in the United Kingdom. The jam sandwich was an affordable food. One plausible reason for this was its ingredients cost little to manufacture; and due to taxes being lifted on sugar in 1880, it became widely available as a cheap foodstuff.

== Ingredients ==
- Any type of jam
- Bread or brown bread (i.e., white or wholemeal)
- (optional) Butter

== Recipe ==
1. Put one slice of bread on the plate.
2. (optional) Get a knife and use it to spread a little bit of butter evenly onto the bread. Make sure to not add too much butter!
3. Get a knife and use it to spread the jam evenly from the jar onto the bread.
4. (optional) Place a second slice of bread on top of the bread and jam.
5. (also optional) Slice the sandwich in half or in multiple slices.

== In popular culture ==
The popular Scottish folk song "The Jeely Piece Song", which appeared in the 1960s, humorously describes the effect of new social housing policies on the eating habits of Scottish youngsters. The lyrics were written by Adam McNaughton, and it was sung to the tune of "Does Your Chewing Gum Lose Its Flavour (On the Bedpost Overnight?)". It was performed by Matt McGinn and many others.

The musical group Jethro Tull referenced a jam sandwich in their 1971 song "Up the 'Pool." 'The 'Pool' is short for Blackpool, Lancashire, in the north of England, and singer Ian Anderson adopts a Lancashire inflection and colloquialisms: "I'm going up the 'Pool/ from down the smoke [referring to London In the south of England, renowned for its air pollution prior to smokeless zoning laws] below/ to taste me mum's jam sarnies/ and see our Auntie Flo."

In Charles Schulz's Peanuts comic, Linus is fond of what he calls "jelly-bread sandwiches".

== See also ==
- List of sandwiches
- Peanut butter and jelly sandwich
