= Ecclesiastical ring =

Finger ring worn by clergy

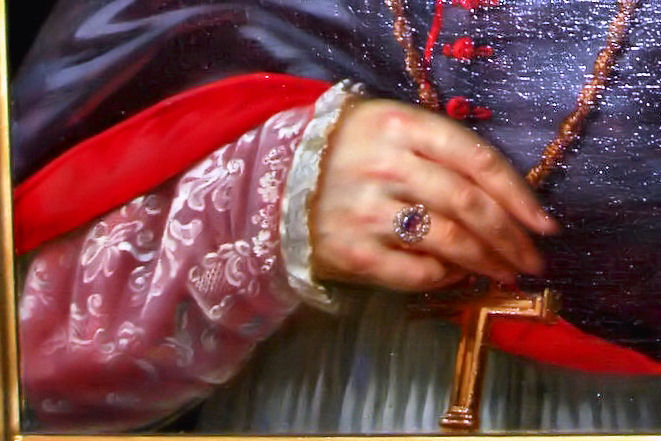
Ecclesiastical ring, eighteenth century

An ecclesiastical ring is a finger ring worn by clergy, such as a bishop's ring.

== As pontifical accoutrements ==
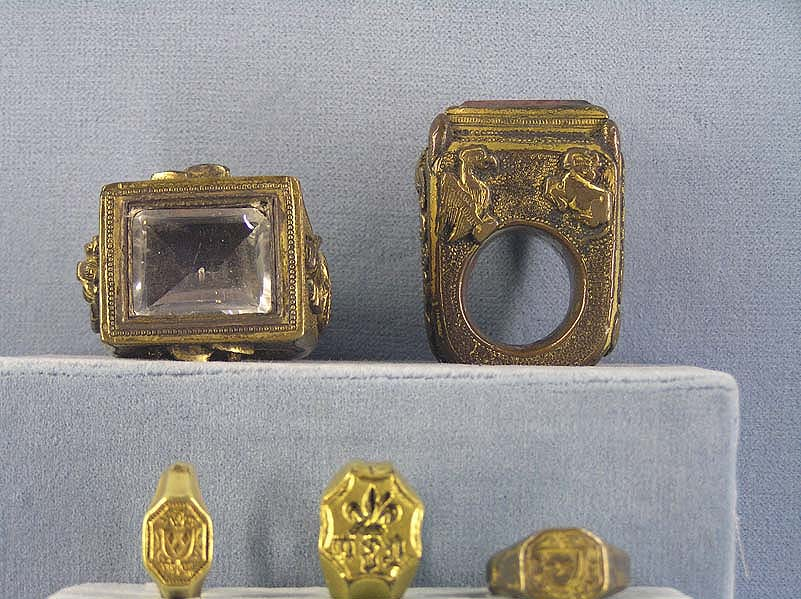
Episcopal rings for bishops and archbishops, (Musée national du Moyen Âge, hôtel de Cluny, Paris)

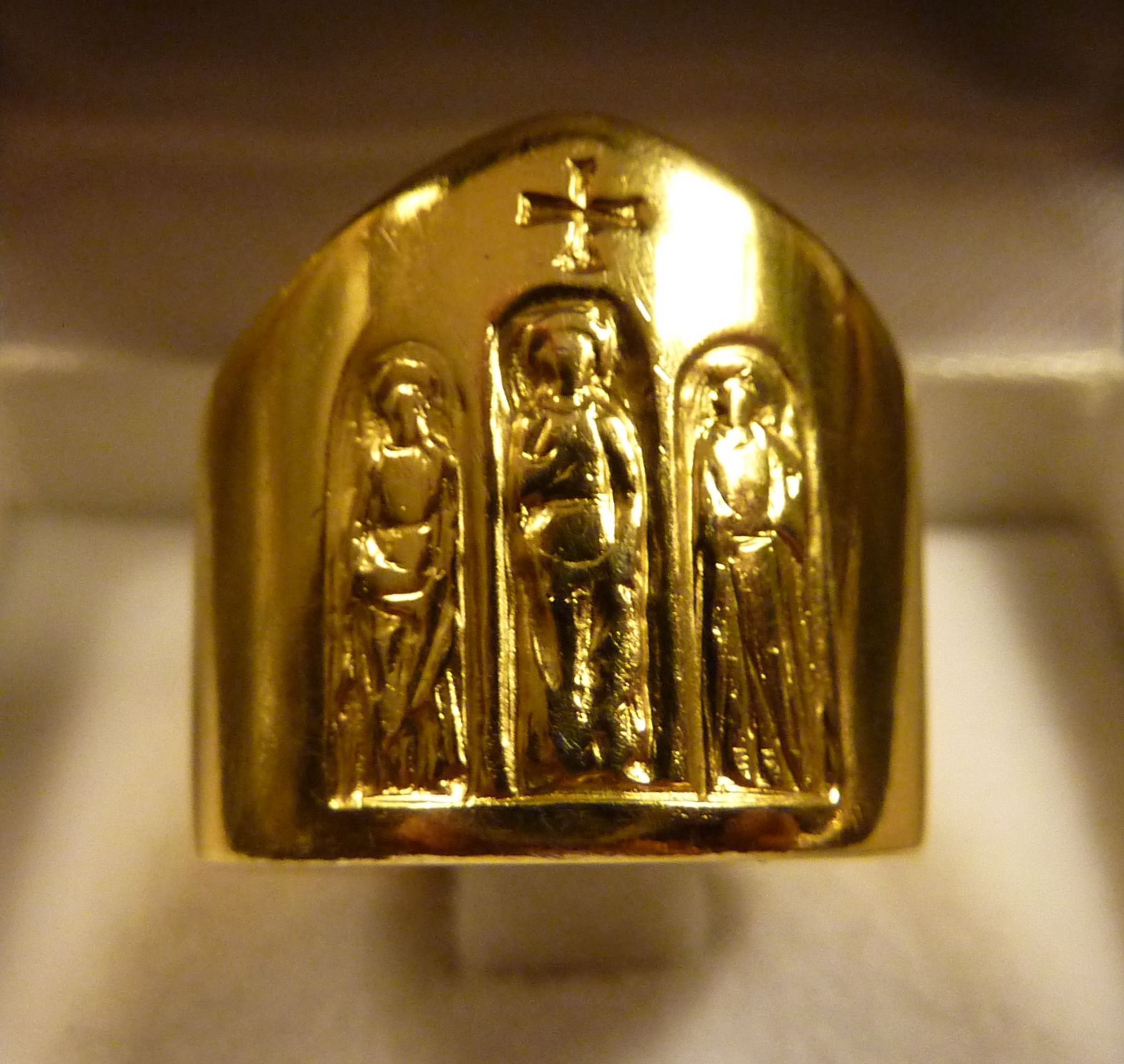
"Council ring" given by Pope Paul VI in 1965 to those bishops who had participated in the Second Vatican Council

In Western Christianity, rings are worn by bishops of the Roman Catholic, Anglican and other denominations. Eastern Orthodox bishops do not normally wear rings, but some Eastern Catholic bishops do.

=== Bishops ===
A bishop is given a ring at his consecration by his consecrator. He is also free to subsequently obtain and wear his own episcopal rings. The style of the episcopal ring has almost always been a very large, gold, stone-set ring. Roman Catholic bishops traditionally have their episcopal ring set with an amethyst.

Aside from the rings a bishop purchases or is given by others, his rings belong to the Church; he will have inherited the previous bishop's ring collection, which is held in trust. While all hierarchs are accorded the honor of being buried wearing a ring, all rings belonging to the Church will be returned to the Church upon the retirement or death of any hierarch. This is a universality, including the Bishop of Rome, ex officio, the Pope.

In a decree of Pope Boniface IV (AD 610) it describes monks raised to the episcopal dignity as anulo pontificali subarrhatis, while at the Fourth Council of Toledo, in 633, it was stated that if a bishop has been deposed from his office and afterwards reinstated, he is to receive back stole, ring and crosier (orarium, anulum et baculum). St. Isidore of Seville, at about the same period, couples the ring with the crosier and declares that the former is conferred as "an emblem of the pontifical dignity or of the sealing of secrets". The ring is strictly speaking an episcopal ornament conferred in the rite of consecration, and that it was commonly regarded as emblematic of the mystical betrothal of the bishop to his church.

In the eighth and ninth centuries in manuscripts of the Gregorian sacramentary and in a few early pontificals (e.g., that attributed to Archbishop Egbert of York) there are various formulae for the delivery of the ring. The Gregorian form, which survives in substance to the present, runs in these terms: "Receive the ring, that is to say, the seal of faith, whereby thou, being thyself adorned with spotless faith, mayst keep unsullied the troth which thou hast pledged to the spouse of God, His Holy Church."

Royal as well as religious seals (signet ring), indicative of discretion and conjugal fidelity, dominate the symbolism of the ring. In the case of bishops, "a bishop deserting the Church to which he was consecrated and transferring himself to another is to be held guilty of adultery, and is to be visited with the same penalties as a man who, forsaking his own wife, goes to live with another woman." Perhaps this idea of espousals helped to establish the rule, mentioned first in the ninth century, that the episcopal ring was to be placed on the fourth finger (the ring finger) of the right hand.

Since episcopal rings had to be worn on ceremonial occasions on the outside of the pontifical glove and prelates' gloves, it is common to find medieval specimens extremely large in size and disproportionately heavy. The inconvenience of the looseness was corrected by placing another smaller ring just above it as a ring guard. It was quite common for bishops and popes to wear other rings along with the episcopal ring; the 1882 edition of Caeremoniale episcoporum (Book II, viii, nn. 10–11) still assumed that this was likely to be the case.

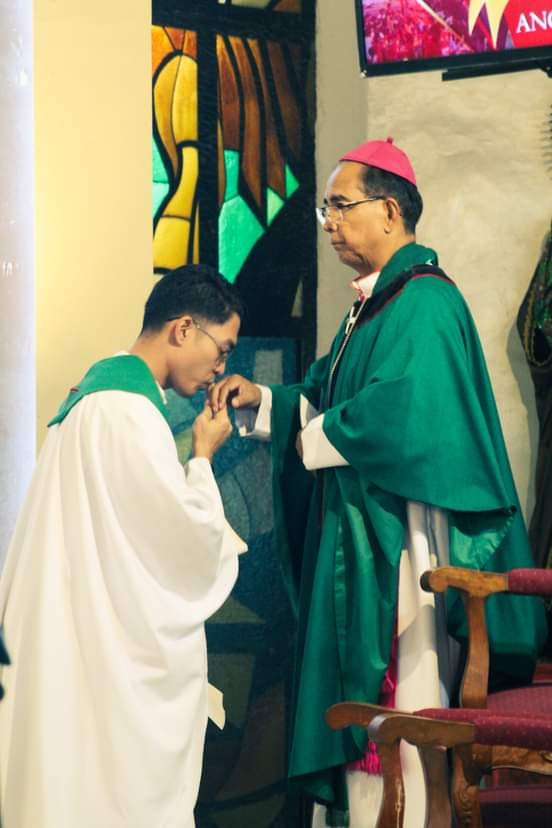
A priest kisses the episcopal ring of a bishop as a sign of respect and obedience to the office of a bishop as his shepherd.

Tradition prescribed that a layman or a cleric of inferior grade on being presented to a bishop should kiss his hand (called baciamano in Italian), which is to say, an obligation to kiss the episcopal ring. Before the promulgation of the 1967 Enchiridion Indulgentiarum, an indulgence of 50 days resulted from this act. It is still arguable that an indulgence may be received if the ring is considered an object of piety, as kissing an object of piety carries a partial indulgence.

Episcopal rings, both at an earlier and later period, were sometimes used as receptacles for relics. Traditionally, three rings were bestowed: the pontifical, the gemmed, and the ordinary. In recent decades, most bishops have only received one ring for the sake of reducing costs.

Modern episcopal rings have a special sliding-band inner mechanism that allows them to be sized and locked into place, eliminating the need to have rings sized or resized. Ludovic Taurin-Cahagne, Bishop of Adramythe in Ethiopia, Apostolic Vicar of the Gallas, c. 1875, had a unique ring that locked and unlocked, apparently an early form of adjustability (and perhaps a security mechanism). Cardinal O'Malley's ring, conferred by Pope John Paul II, could be opened from the back and resized.

There are times when a bishop may be awarded an episcopal ring with a form of a coat of arms or specific Catholic symbol, such as the ring given to Bishop Henessy of Boston.

=== Cardinals ===
Cardinals have the privilege of wearing pontifical vestments, including the ring, even if they are not themselves consecrated as bishops. The privilege of wearing a ring has belonged to cardinal-priests at least since the time of Innocent III.

Cardinal bishops and cardinal priests are conferred a ring by the pope himself in the consistory, in which the new cardinal is named to a particular titular church (for a cardinal priest) or suburbicarian diocese (for a cardinal bishop) and elevated to the cardinalate. The pope determines the style of this ring. In the past, a cardinal's ring could be set with a sapphire, while it bore on the inner side of the bezel the arms of the pope conferring it. The solid gold cardinal's ring chosen by John Paul II bears an oblong crucifixion scene. Pope Benedict XVI used the same at first, but chose a new design from the consistory of 2012.

=== Pope ===
The episcopal ring of the pope is known as the Ring of the Fisherman (Latin: Annulus Piscatoris). Originally the pope's episcopal ring as the Bishop of Rome, it has since become a symbol of papal authority. The origin of the ring design is inspired by Jesus telling St. Peter, who was by trade a fisherman, "I will make you a fisher of men."

The Ring of the Fisherman is a large gold ring with a round or, more recently, an ovoid, bezel. As recently as the 1970s, it was a large medallion shape. On the face appears the image of St. Peter in a fishing boat on the water; above him is the chosen name of the pope. Upon the death or resignation of a pope, the ring is broken.

=== Abbots ===
Some abbots were given the privilege of wearing pontifical vestments reserved only to bishops by virtue of their office within monasteries. Certain abbesses have also received such a privilege. As part of this privilege of wearing pontifical accoutrements, both abbots and abbesses wear a ring. The blessing and delivery of a ring has formed part of the rite for the blessing of an abbot or an abbess.

== Other uses within the Catholic Church ==
Certain other offices within the Catholic Church are given the privilege of wearing rings even if they do not partake of the privilege of pontifical vestments. In the Roman Catholic Church, the privilege to wear a ring indicates the papal recognition and granting of authority to wear such a ring. Such rings cannot ordinarily be worn by these minor prelates during the celebration of Mass.

Minor prelates like protonotaries apostolic may wear them, while some canons may also wear them with special papal indult.

In the Order of Preachers, the honorary title of Master of Sacred Theology, roughly equal to an honorary doctorate in theology, includes the privilege of wearing a non-liturgical ring, which may be set with an amethyst. It is not unusual for the ring to be inscribed inside the band with the initials of the previous Masters of Sacred Theology of the province.

The tradition of wedding bands worn by certain nuns and consecrated virgins conferred upon them in the course of their solemn consecration of virginity, according to the rite of consecration provided in the Roman pontifical is found in ancient tradition. Ambrose of Milan speaks as though it were customary for consecrated virgins to wear a ring as a sign of their betrothal to Jesus Christ, their heavenly spouse. This bestowal of a ring to nuns with solemn vows is also mentioned by several medieval pontificals, from the twelfth century onwards.

The Marianist brothers wear a signet ring representing the vows they made, while the Benedictine Sisters of Perpetual Adoration wear a ring as part of their religious habit. The Order of Clerks Regular of St. Viator wear a ring and are also permitted, by papal indult, to wear the ring of investiture even during Mass.

== Other uses within Christianity ==
Wedding rings, or more strictly, rings given in the betrothal ceremony, were common among Christians under the Roman Empire from an early period. The use of such rings was of older date than Christianity, and there is not much to suggest that the giving of the ring was at first incorporated in any ritual for laypeople, or invested with any precise religious significance. It is known from archeological finds that the betrothal/wedding ring was adorned with Christian emblems. Certain specimens prove this today, such as a gold ring found near Arles, from circa the fourth or fifth century AD, and bearing the inscription Tecla vivat Deo cum marito seo [suo].

In the coronation ceremony too, it has long been the custom to deliver both to the sovereign and to the queen consort a ring previously blessed. Perhaps the earliest example of the use of such a ring is in the case of Judith, the stepmother of King Alfred the Great, but it is unclear whether that ring was bestowed upon the queen in virtue of her dignity as queen consort or of her nuptials to King Æthelwulf of Wessex.

For the year of his office the Moderator of the General Assembly of the Church of Scotland (chairman of the General Assembly) wears an amethyst and gold ring. The stone has incised on it the crest of the Church of Scotland – a burning bush – and around it the words "Nec Tamen Consumebatur" ("Burning but not being consumed"). The words refer to Moses' encounter with the burning bush in the desert. Each year as the retiring moderator installs his successor in office, he places the ring on the new moderator's finger.

Other religious rings:

- At an early date the small keys which contained filings from the chains of St. Peter were welded to a band of metal and worn upon the finger as reliquaries.
- An ancient custom to this day at the Saint Catherine's Monastery on Mount Sinai in Egypt, is to place a ring on the finger of St. Catherine of Alexandria and then wear it as a eulogia (blessing).
- In modern times, rings with ten small knobs or protuberances are common. These are used for reciting the rosary (called a "rosary ring"). The rosary ring was used during World War I for soldiers in the field to be able to recite the rosary more easily.
- Orthodox Christians have komboskini ("prayer rope") rings with ten knots.
- The little-known but once common memorial ring may be bequeathed to beneficiaries by a deceased loved one. It is usually a plain band of some type, meant to remind the wearers of the deceased. This custom has generally come to an end, but something like it survives today among closely knit, religious families and friends.
- Religious medals are commonly shaped and formed into rings for daily wear and even for devotions. Most common among these is a ring made from a medal of the Archangel Michael, known as "the ring of St. Michael".
- Late in the Roman Christian Era, cameos of saints were often worn by wealthy Christians. Early in the era, simple iron bands were worn by all the faithful, though the wealthy of Rome would often cover their gold rings with charcoal, in order to appear more pious.
- The Claddagh ring is viewed as a religious ring in Ireland, though it symbolizes civil status: whether single, engaged or married. However, it does not bear any religious image or symbol.
- Christians in Brazil, especially Catholics, are among those who may wear a tucum ring as a symbol of the commitment of their churches to the poor and oppressed peoples of Latin America. It is particularly linked with liberation theology and was originally a tradition among Afro-Brazilian slaves and Native Brazilians, for whom it symbolized marriage, friendship, and their struggle for liberation. It is so named because it is made from the seed of the local tucum palm.
