= Demotispa =

Scientific classification
- Kingdom: Animalia
- Phylum: Arthropoda
- Clade: Pancrustacea
- Class: Insecta
- Order: Coleoptera
- Suborder: Polyphaga
- Infraorder: Cucujiformia
- Family: Chrysomelidae
- Subfamily: Cassidinae
- Tribe: Imatidiini
- Genus: Demotispa; Baly, 1858

Synonyms
- Stilpnaspis Weise, 1905; Rhodimatidium Aslam, 1966

Genus of leaf beetles

Demotispa is a genus of beetles belonging to the family Chrysomelidae.

== Species ==
- Demotispa coccinata
- Demotispa filicornis
- Demotispa flavipennis
- Demotispa fulva
- Demotispa fuscocincta
- Demotispa impunctata
- Demotispa marginata
- Demotispa miniacea
- Demotispa monteverdensis
- Demotispa nevermanni
- Demotispa panamensis
- Demotispa pulchella
- Demotispa rubiginosa
- Demotispa rubricata
- Demotispa sanguinea
- Demotispa scarlatina
- Demotispa tambitoensis
- Demotispa tricolor

== Selected former species ==
- Demotispa limbata
- Demotispa limbatella
