= Pseudimatidium =

Scientific classification
- Kingdom: Animalia
- Phylum: Arthropoda
- Clade: Pancrustacea
- Class: Insecta
- Order: Coleoptera
- Suborder: Polyphaga
- Infraorder: Cucujiformia
- Family: Chrysomelidae
- Subfamily: Cassidinae
- Tribe: Imatidiini
- Genus: Pseudimatidium; Aslam, 1966

Genus of leaf beetles

Pseudimatidium is a genus of beetles belonging to the family Chrysomelidae.

== Species ==
- Pseudimatidium bicoloricornis
- Pseudimatidium bondari
- Pseudimatidium discoideum
- Pseudimatidium elaeicola
- Pseudimatidium florianoi
- Pseudimatidium gomescostai
- Pseudimatidium limbatum
- Pseudimatidium limbatellum
- Pseudimatidium madoni
- Pseudimatidium neivai
- Pseudimatidium pallidum
- Pseudimatidium pici
- Pseudimatidium procerulum

== Taxonomy ==
Borowiec treated Pseudimatidium as a synonym of Demotispa. However, Pseudimatidium was restored to valid genus status in 2014.
