= Joelho =

Snack of Rio de Janeiro, Brazil

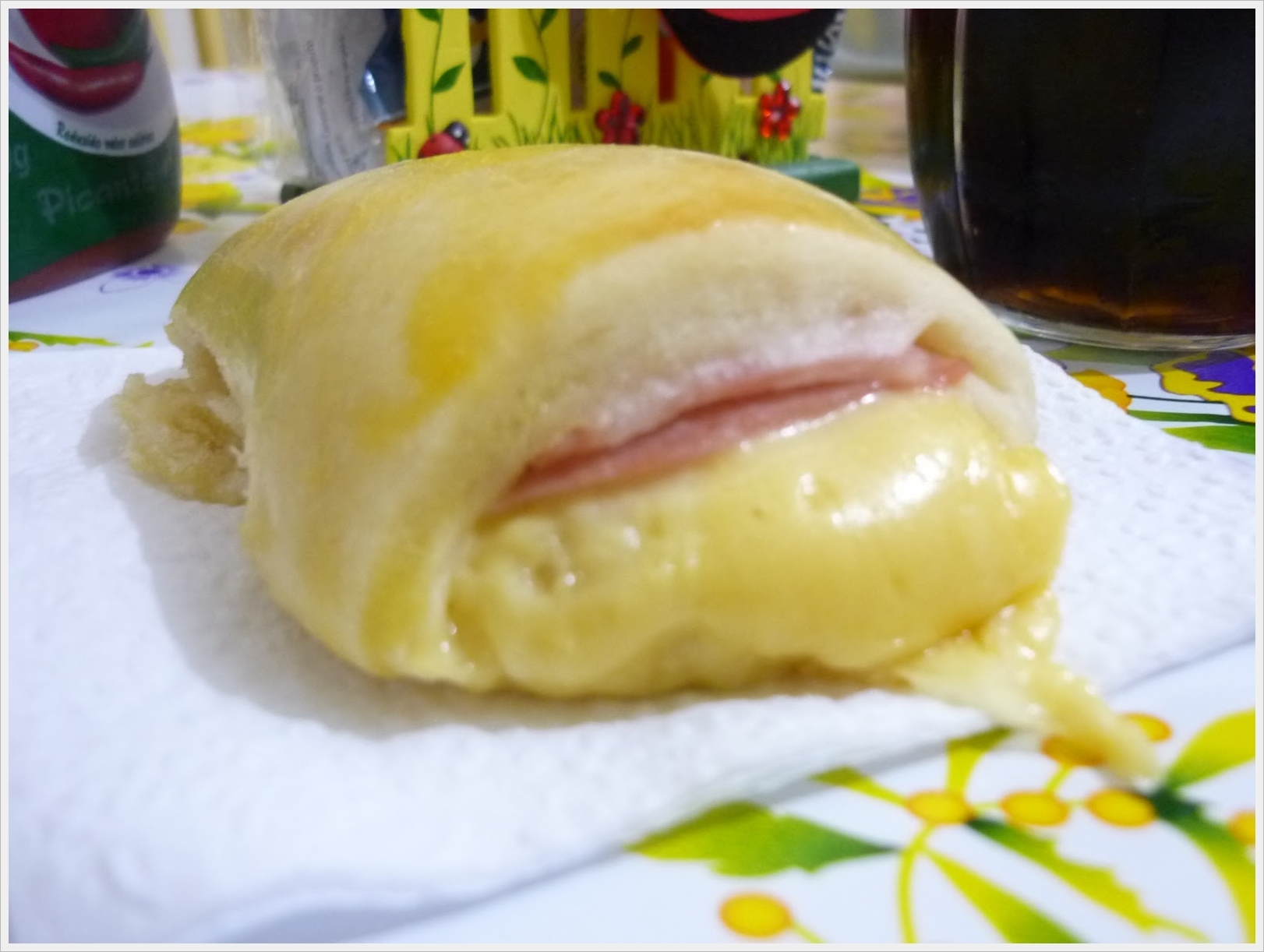
Classic joelho

Popularly called joelho, also known as italiano, is a traditional savory snack in the city of Rio de Janeiro and its metropolitan area.

It is also called enroladinho, bauru (if with tomato), americano, pão pizza, jacaré and misto throughout Brazil.

Made with bread dough filled with ham and cheese, it is sold in almost every bakery, small snack bars, and kiosks in Rio de Janeiro's capital city.
