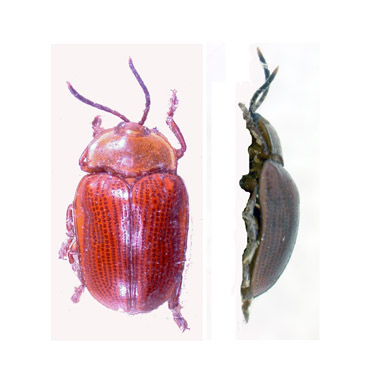

Scientific classification
- Kingdom: Animalia
- Phylum: Arthropoda
- Clade: Pancrustacea
- Class: Insecta
- Order: Coleoptera
- Suborder: Polyphaga
- Infraorder: Cucujiformia
- Family: Chrysomelidae
- Genus: Pseudimatidium
- Species: P. pallidum

Binomial name
- Pseudimatidium pallidum (Baly, 1858)

Synonyms
- Demotispa pallida Baly, 1858; Demothispa rufa Pic, 1926

= Pseudimatidium pallidum =

Species of beetle

Pseudimatidium pallidum is a species of beetle of the family Chrysomelidae. It is found in Brazil (Pará), Colombia and French Guiana.

== Life history ==
The recorded host plants for this species are Elaeis guineensis, Bactris gasipaes, Astrocaryum carnosum, Astrocaryum chonta and Astrocaryum vulgare.
