= Dasyophthalma vertebralis =

Scientific classification
- Kingdom: Animalia
- Phylum: Arthropoda
- Class: Insecta
- Order: Lepidoptera
- Family: Nymphalidae
- Genus: Dasyophthalma
- Species: D. vertebralis

Binomial name
- Dasyophthalma vertebralis Butler, 1869

Species of butterfly

Dasyophthalma vertebralis is a butterfly of the family Nymphalidae. It is found in Brazil (Minas Gerais and Espírito Santo). The habitat consists of forests.

The under surface as in Dasyophthalma creusa with three large red-brown, black-ringed median ocelli, placed in a light yellowish patch. Band of the forewing narrow, oblique, composed of spots. Under surface of the hindwing with 3 ocelli: the first in the middle of the costa, the 2nd distally to the cell, the 3rd in the posterior median cellule. Female larger, with broader wings and duller colouring, so that the striae of the under surface show through. The band of the forewing runs more steeply.
