= X-caboquinho =

Brazilian sandwich

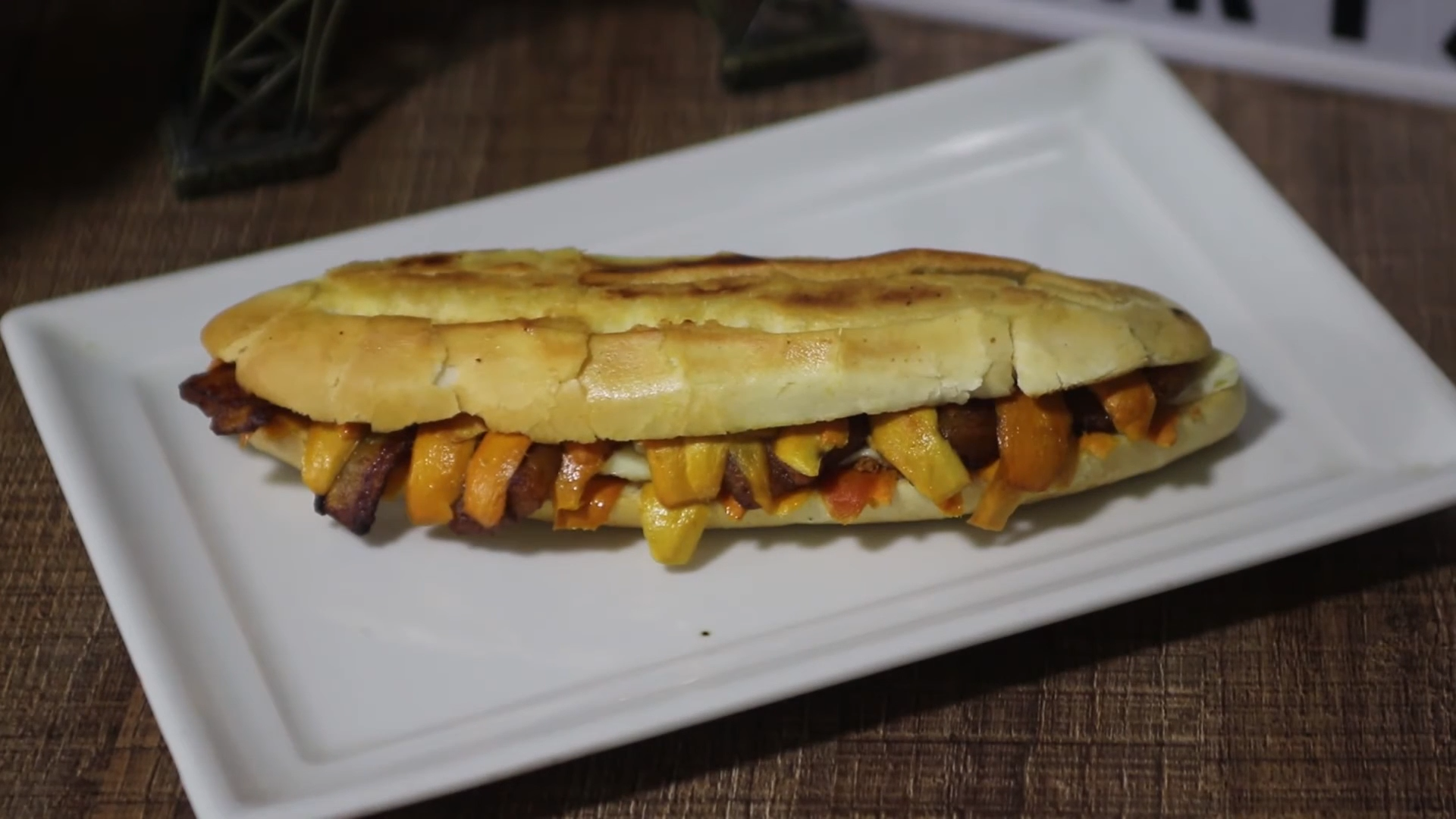
- Place of origin: Brazil
- Region or state: Amazonas (state)
- Serving temperature: Hot
- Main ingredients: Tucumã, queijo coalho, fried plantain

A x-caboquinho is a sandwich consisting of tucumã shavings, queijo coalho, and fried plantain between a sliced buttered pão francês. It is typical to the Brazilian state of Amazonas and is officially recognized as an intangible cultural heritage of the state capital of Manaus.

The sandwich originated in Parintins and was popularized in Manaus by Escola Técnica Federal do Amazonas students from Parintins in the 1960s.

== See also ==
- Mercado Adolpho Lisboa
