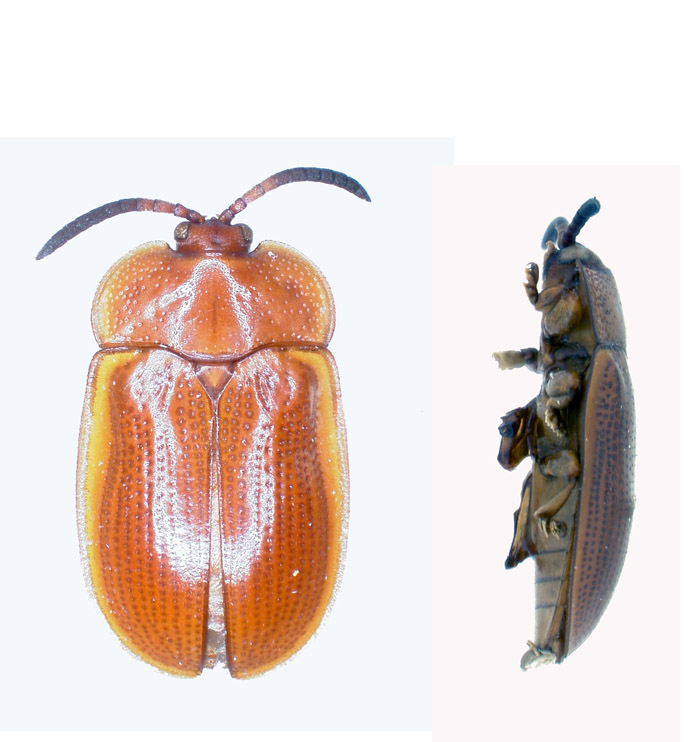

Scientific classification
- Kingdom: Animalia
- Phylum: Arthropoda
- Clade: Pancrustacea
- Class: Insecta
- Order: Coleoptera
- Suborder: Polyphaga
- Infraorder: Cucujiformia
- Family: Chrysomelidae
- Genus: Pseudimatidium
- Species: P. neivai

Binomial name
- Pseudimatidium neivai (Bondar, 1940)

Synonyms
- Himatidium neivai Bondar, 1940; Demotispa neivai

= Pseudimatidium neivai =

Species of beetle

Pseudimatidium neivai is a species of beetle of the family Chrysomelidae. It is found in Brazil (Bahia, Pernambuco). There are other records from Colombia, Ecuador, Panama, Peru, Suriname and Venezuela, but these possibly belong to different Pseudimatidium species.

== Life history ==
The recorded host plants for this species are Cocos botryophora, Cocos nucifera, Areca, Bactris (including Bactris setosa), Licuala and Livistona species, as well as Desmoncus polyacanthus, Elaeis guineensis and Astrocaryum tucumoides.
