= Demotispa sanguinea =

Scientific classification
- Kingdom: Animalia
- Phylum: Arthropoda
- Clade: Pancrustacea
- Class: Insecta
- Order: Coleoptera
- Suborder: Polyphaga
- Infraorder: Cucujiformia
- Family: Chrysomelidae
- Genus: Demotispa
- Species: D. sanguinea

Binomial name
- Demotispa sanguinea (Champion, 1894)

Synonyms
- Himatidium sanguineum Champion, 1894

Species of beetle

Demotispa sanguinea is a species of beetle of the family Chrysomelidae. It is found in Costa Rica.

== Life history ==
No host plant has been documented for this species.

== Taxonomy ==
Demotispa sanguinea was synonymized with Demotispa rubiginosa by Spaeth in 1917, but its species status was restored in 2014.
