= A. vulgare =

A. vulgare may refer to:

- Armadillidium vulgare, the (common) pill-bug or (common) pill woodlouse, a widespread woodlouse species found in Europe
- Astrocaryum vulgare, the tucumã-do-Pará in Brazil, aouara in French Guiana or awarra in Suriname, a palm species native to Amazon

== See also ==
- Vulgare
