= Demotispa marginata =

Scientific classification
- Kingdom: Animalia
- Phylum: Arthropoda
- Clade: Pancrustacea
- Class: Insecta
- Order: Coleoptera
- Suborder: Polyphaga
- Infraorder: Cucujiformia
- Family: Chrysomelidae
- Genus: Demotispa
- Species: D. marginata

Binomial name
- Demotispa marginata (Weise, 1905)

Synonyms
- Stilpnaspis marginata Weise, 1905

Species of beetle

Demotispa marginata is a species of beetle of the family Chrysomelidae. It is found in Bolivia.

== Description ==
Adults reach a length of about 5.1 mm. They have a yellow head, antennae and legs, while the pronotal disc and elytral disc (except the apex) are deep red.

== Life history ==
No host plant has been documented for this species.
