= Demotispa rubricata =

Scientific classification
- Kingdom: Animalia
- Phylum: Arthropoda
- Clade: Pancrustacea
- Class: Insecta
- Order: Coleoptera
- Suborder: Polyphaga
- Infraorder: Cucujiformia
- Family: Chrysomelidae
- Genus: Demotispa
- Species: D. rubricata

Binomial name
- Demotispa rubricata (Guérin-Méneville, 1844)

Synonyms
- Imatidium rubricatum Guérin-Méneville, 1844; Parimatidium rubricatum; Himatidium latum Spaeth, 1923

Species of beetle

Demotispa rubricata is a species of beetle of the family Chrysomelidae. It is found in French Guiana.

== Life history ==
No host plant has been documented for this species.
