= Demotispa filicornis =

Scientific classification
- Kingdom: Animalia
- Phylum: Arthropoda
- Clade: Pancrustacea
- Class: Insecta
- Order: Coleoptera
- Suborder: Polyphaga
- Infraorder: Cucujiformia
- Family: Chrysomelidae
- Genus: Demotispa
- Species: D. filicornis

Binomial name
- Demotispa filicornis (Borowiec, 2000)

Synonyms
- Stilpnaspis filicornis Borowiec, 2000

Species of beetle

Demotispa filicornis is a species of beetle of the family Chrysomelidae. It is found in Ecuador.

== Description ==
Adults reach a length of about 5.6 mm. The pronotal disc and elytral disc are red, while the head, explanate margins of the pronotum and elytra, and the legs are yellow.

== Life history ==
No host plant has been documented for this species.

== Etymology ==
The species is named after its very slim antennae.
