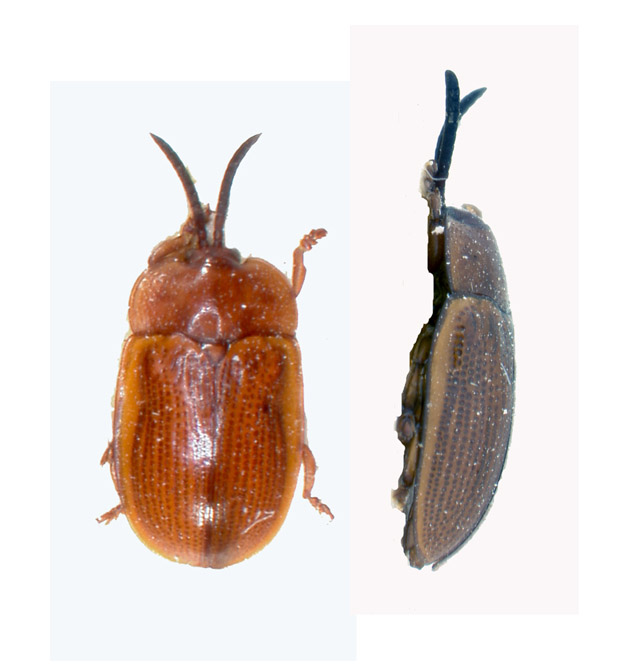

Scientific classification
- Kingdom: Animalia
- Phylum: Arthropoda
- Clade: Pancrustacea
- Class: Insecta
- Order: Coleoptera
- Suborder: Polyphaga
- Infraorder: Cucujiformia
- Family: Chrysomelidae
- Genus: Pseudimatidium
- Species: P. bondari

Binomial name
- Pseudimatidium bondari (Spaeth, 1938)

Synonyms
- Himatidium bondari Spaeth, 1938; Demotispa bondari

= Pseudimatidium bondari =

Species of beetle

Pseudimatidium bondari is a species of beetle of the family Chrysomelidae. It is found in Brazil (Bahia).

== Life history ==
The recorded host plants for this species are palms, including Cocos nucifera and Geonoma species.
