= Pseudimatidium bicoloricornis =

Scientific classification
- Kingdom: Animalia
- Phylum: Arthropoda
- Clade: Pancrustacea
- Class: Insecta
- Order: Coleoptera
- Suborder: Polyphaga
- Infraorder: Cucujiformia
- Family: Chrysomelidae
- Genus: Pseudimatidium
- Species: P. bicoloricornis

Binomial name
- Pseudimatidium bicoloricornis (Pic, 1926)

Synonyms
- Demothispa bicoloricornis Pic, 1926; Windsorispa bicoloricornis; Parimatidium bicoloricornis

Species of beetle

Pseudimatidium bicoloricornis is a species of beetle of the family Chrysomelidae. It is found in French Guiana.
