= Demotispa flavipennis =

Scientific classification
- Kingdom: Animalia
- Phylum: Arthropoda
- Clade: Pancrustacea
- Class: Insecta
- Order: Coleoptera
- Suborder: Polyphaga
- Infraorder: Cucujiformia
- Family: Chrysomelidae
- Genus: Demotispa
- Species: D. flavipennis

Binomial name
- Demotispa flavipennis (Pic, 1923)

Synonyms
- Demothispa flavipennis Pic, 1923

Species of beetle

Demotispa flavipennis is a species of beetle of the family Chrysomelidae. It is found in Bolivia.

== Life history ==
No host plant has been documented for this species.
