= Demotispa fulva =

Scientific classification
- Kingdom: Animalia
- Phylum: Arthropoda
- Clade: Pancrustacea
- Class: Insecta
- Order: Coleoptera
- Suborder: Polyphaga
- Infraorder: Cucujiformia
- Family: Chrysomelidae
- Genus: Demotispa
- Species: D. fulva

Binomial name
- Demotispa fulva (Boheman, 1850)

Synonyms
- Himatidium fulvum Boheman, 1850; Stilpnaspis fulvum; Calliaspis nigricornis Kirsch, 1865

Species of beetle

Demotispa fulva is a species of beetle of the family Chrysomelidae. It is found in Colombia and possibly Suriname.

== Life history ==
No host plant has been documented for this species.
