= Demotispa coccinata =

Scientific classification
- Kingdom: Animalia
- Phylum: Arthropoda
- Clade: Pancrustacea
- Class: Insecta
- Order: Coleoptera
- Suborder: Polyphaga
- Infraorder: Cucujiformia
- Family: Chrysomelidae
- Genus: Demotispa
- Species: D. coccinata

Binomial name
- Demotispa coccinata (Boheman, 1862)

Synonyms
- Himatidium coccinatum Boheman, 1862; Stilpnaspis coccinatum; Imatidium coccinatum; Rhodimatidium coccinatum

Species of beetle

Demotispa coccinata is a species of beetle of the family Chrysomelidae. It is found in Brazil (Amazonas) and Peru.

== Life history ==
No host plant has been documented for this species.
