= Dasyophthalma geraensis =

Scientific classification
- Domain: Eukaryota
- Kingdom: Animalia
- Phylum: Arthropoda
- Class: Insecta
- Order: Lepidoptera
- Family: Nymphalidae
- Genus: Dasyophthalma
- Species: D. geraensis

Binomial name
- Dasyophthalma geraensis Rebel, 1922

Species of butterfly

Dasyophthalma geraensis is a butterfly of the family Nymphalidae. It is found in Brazil (Minas Gerais: the Mantiqueira mountain range). The habitat consists of high elevation forests (about 1,200 meters).

The larvae feed on Bactris tormentosa.
