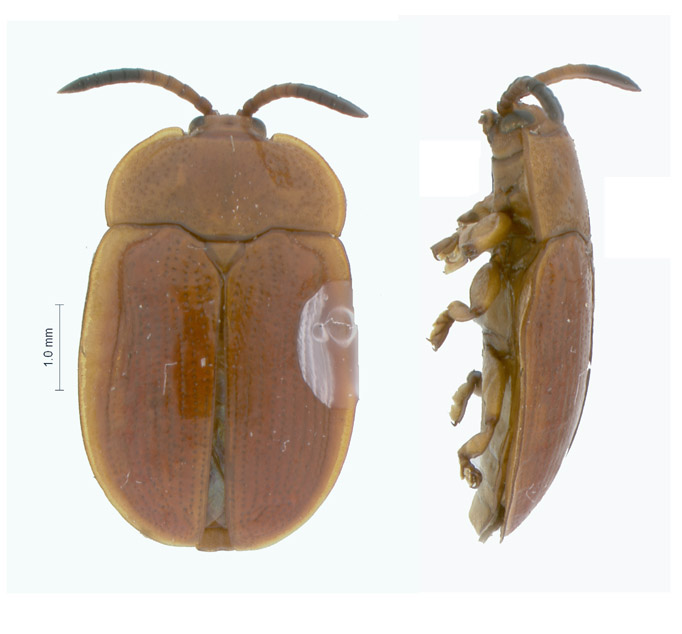

Scientific classification
- Kingdom: Animalia
- Phylum: Arthropoda
- Clade: Pancrustacea
- Class: Insecta
- Order: Coleoptera
- Suborder: Polyphaga
- Infraorder: Cucujiformia
- Family: Chrysomelidae
- Genus: Pseudimatidium
- Species: P. elaeicola

Binomial name
- Pseudimatidium elaeicola Aslam, 1965

Synonyms
- Demotispa elaeicola

= Pseudimatidium elaeicola =

Species of beetle

Pseudimatidium elaeicola is a species of beetle of the family Chrysomelidae. It is found in Colombia and Ecuador.

== Life history ==
The recorded host plant for this species is Elaeis guineensis.
