= Demotispa scarlatina =

Scientific classification
- Kingdom: Animalia
- Phylum: Arthropoda
- Clade: Pancrustacea
- Class: Insecta
- Order: Coleoptera
- Suborder: Polyphaga
- Infraorder: Cucujiformia
- Family: Chrysomelidae
- Genus: Demotispa
- Species: D. scarlatina

Binomial name
- Demotispa scarlatina (Spaeth, 1938)

Synonyms
- Himatidium scarlatinum Spaeth, 1938; Stilpnaspis scarlatinum

Species of beetle

Demotispa scarlatina is a species of beetle of the family Chrysomelidae. It is found in Ecuador.

== Life history ==
No host plant has been documented for this species.
