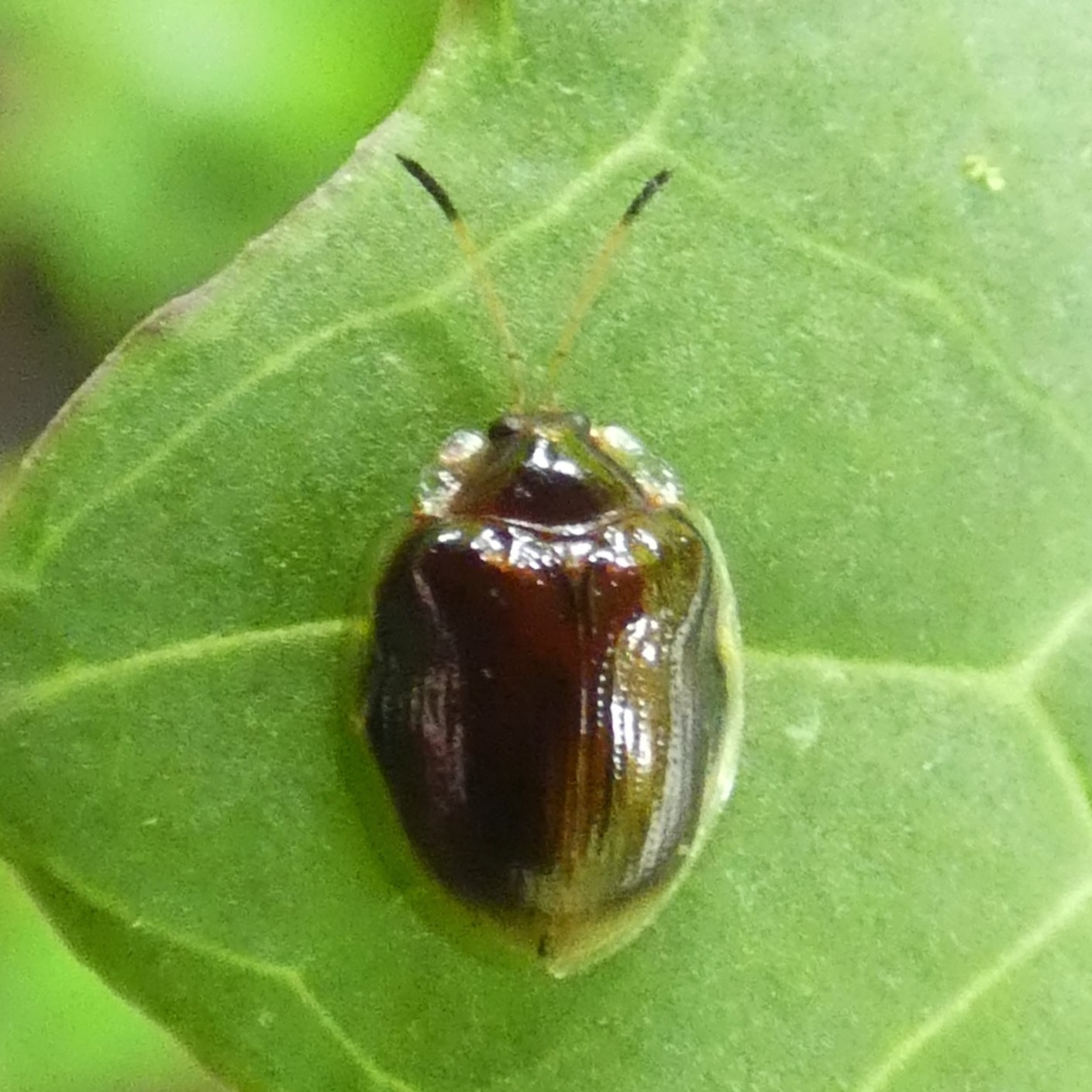

Scientific classification
- Kingdom: Animalia
- Phylum: Arthropoda
- Clade: Pancrustacea
- Class: Insecta
- Order: Coleoptera
- Suborder: Polyphaga
- Infraorder: Cucujiformia
- Family: Chrysomelidae
- Genus: Demotispa
- Species: D. impunctata

Binomial name
- Demotispa impunctata (Borowiec, 2000)

Synonyms
- Stilpnaspis impunctata Borowiec, 2000

= Demotispa impunctata =

Species of beetle

Demotispa impunctata is a species of beetle in the family Chrysomelidae. It is found in Costa Rica.

== Description ==
Adults reach a length of about 4.3 mm. The body, including the legs is yellow, while the pronotal and elytral discs are darker. Segments 1-7 of the antennae are also yellow, while segments 8-10 are black and segment 11 has a black basal half and a yellow apical half.

== Life history ==
No host plant has been documented for this species.

== Etymology ==
The species is named after the impunctate sides of the pronotal disc.
