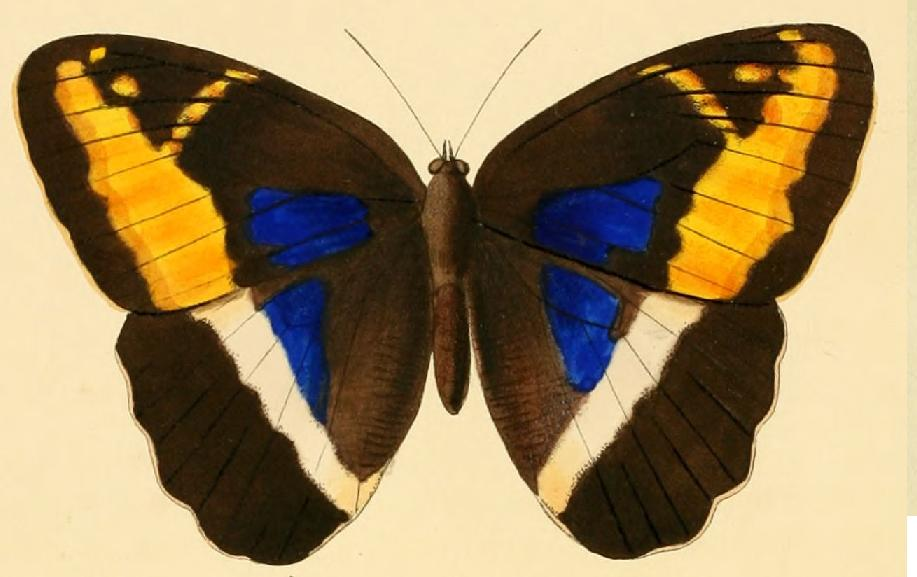

Scientific classification
- Domain: Eukaryota
- Kingdom: Animalia
- Phylum: Arthropoda
- Class: Insecta
- Order: Lepidoptera
- Family: Nymphalidae
- Tribe: Brassolini
- Genus: Dasyophthalma; Westwood, [1851]

= Dasyophthalma =

Genus of brush-footed butterflies

Dasyophthalma is a genus of medium-sized brownish butterflies in the family Nymphalidae. They are endemic to the Atlantic coastal region of Brazil. They feed on palms.

== Species ==
- Dasyophthalma creusa (Hübner, [1821])
- Dasyophthalma geraensis Rebel, 1922
- Dasyophthalma rusina (Godart, [1824])
- Dasyophthalma vertebralis Butler, 1869
