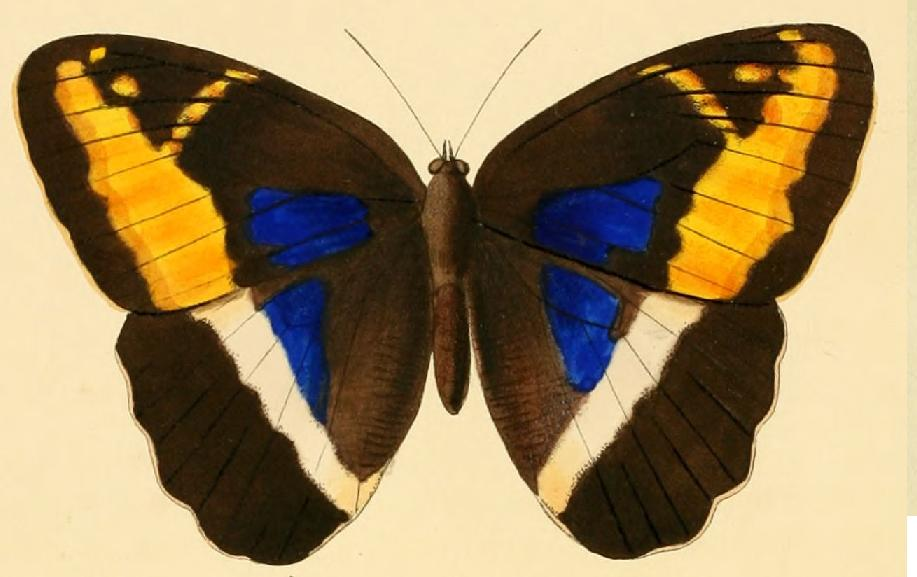

Scientific classification
- Kingdom: Animalia
- Phylum: Arthropoda
- Class: Insecta
- Order: Lepidoptera
- Family: Nymphalidae
- Genus: Dasyophthalma
- Species: D. rusina

Binomial name
- Dasyophthalma rusina (Godart, [1824])

Synonyms
- Morpho rusina Godart, [1824]; Pavonia lycaon Lucas, [1835]; Dasyophthalma rusina ab. donckieri Joicey & Talbot, 1922

= Dasyophthalma rusina =

Species of butterfly

Dasyophthalma rusina is a butterfly of the family Nymphalidae. It is found in Brazil, from Bahia to Santa Catarina. The habitat consists of high altitude areas (about 1,200 meters).

== Description ==
D. rusina is characterised by the brilliant, intensive deep blue reflections on the basal part of the forewing and the median area of the hind- wing.

== Biology ==
The larvae feed on Geonoma schottiana, Bactris tomentosa, Euterpe edulis and Bambusa species.

== Subspecies ==
- Dasyophthalma rusina rusina (Brazil)
- Dasyophthalma rusina delanira Hewitson, 1862 (Brazil)
- Dasyophthalma rusina principesa Stichel, 1904 (Brazil: Espírito Santo)

== Gallery ==
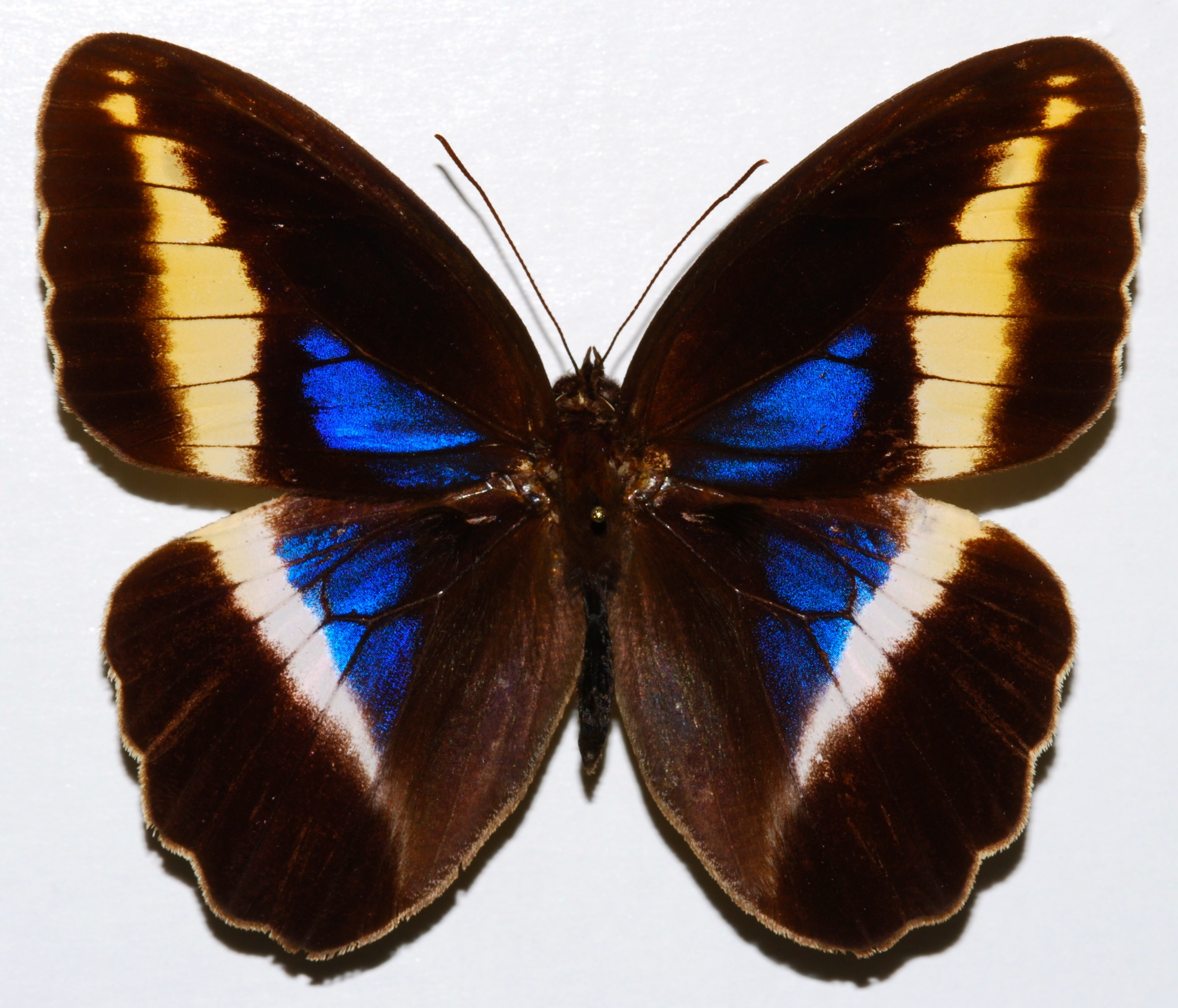

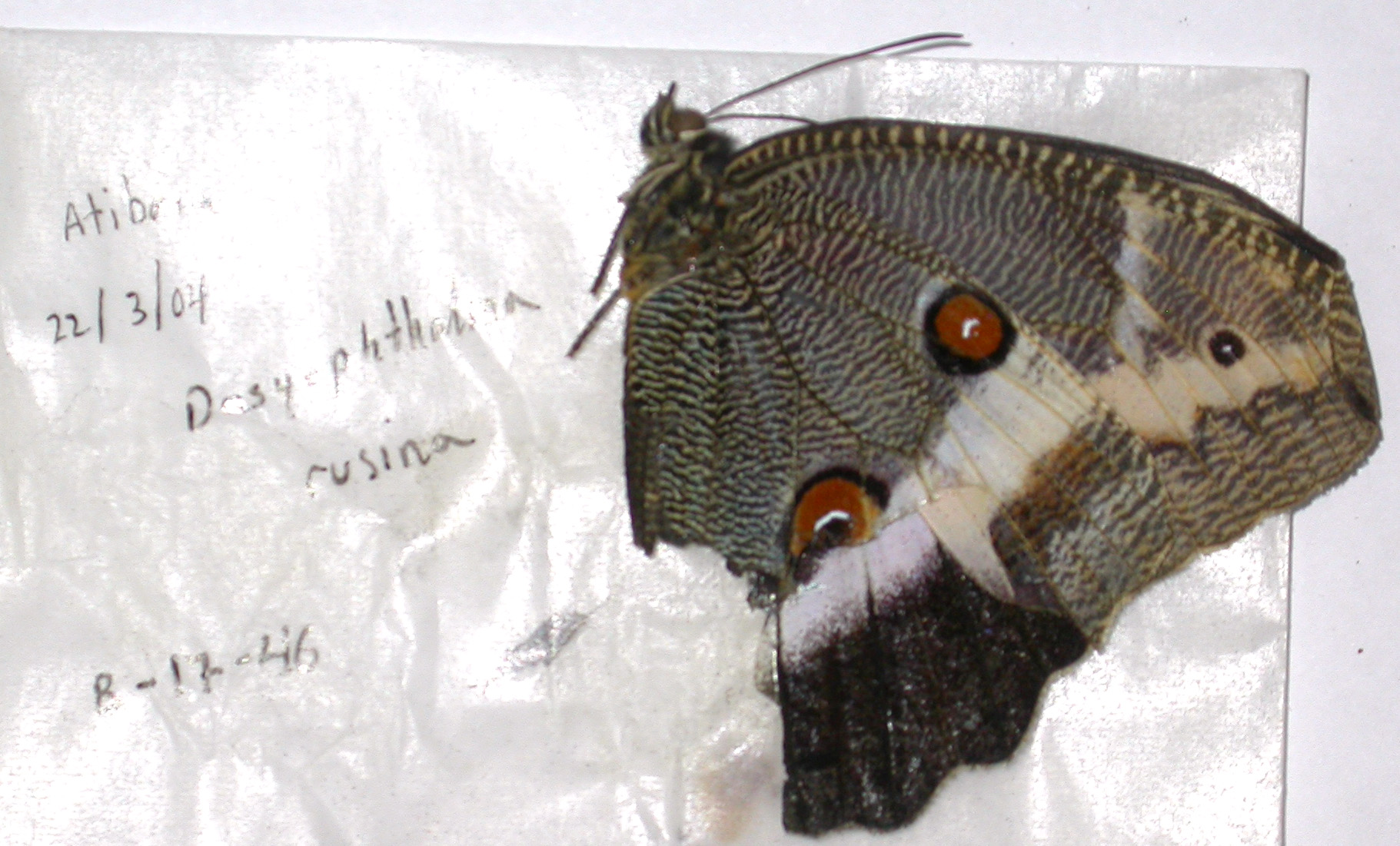
