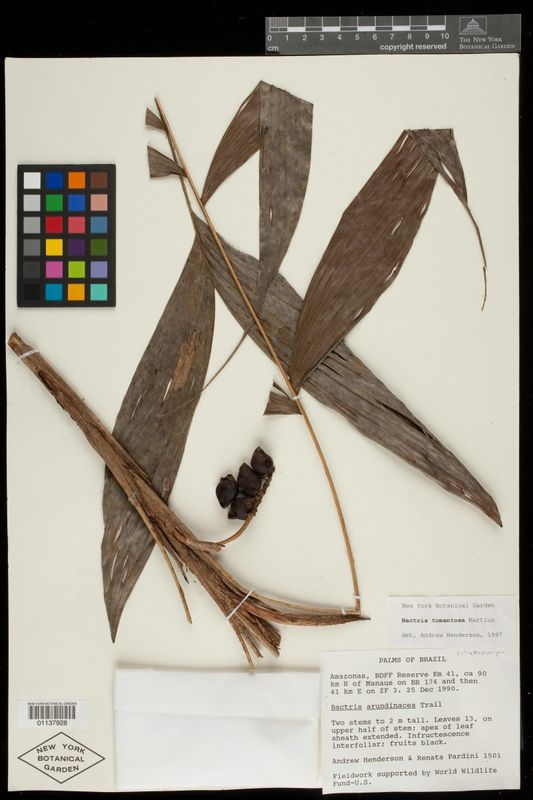

Conservation status
- Least Concern (IUCN 3.1)

Scientific classification
- Kingdom: Plantae
- Clade: Embryophytes
- Clade: Tracheophytes
- Clade: Spermatophytes
- Clade: Angiosperms
- Clade: Monocots
- Clade: Commelinids
- Order: Arecales
- Family: Arecaceae
- Genus: Bactris
- Species: B. tomentosa

Binomial name
- Bactris tomentosa Mart.

Synonyms
- Bactris arundinacea (Trail) Drude; Bactris capillacea (Trail) Drude; Bactris capinensis Huber; Bactris eumorpha Trail; Bactris eumorpha subsp. arundinacea Trail; Bactris tomentosa subsp. capillacea Trail; Bactris tomentosa var. negrensis A.D.Hawkes

= Bactris tomentosa =

Species of flowering plant

Bactris tomentosa is a species of flowering plant in the family Arecaceae. It is a shrub or palm tree with spines, eight to thirteen leaves, and black to purplish fruits. The species is native to Brazil and French Guiana.

Bactris tomentosa was described in 1826, and is listed as of Least Concern by the IUCN.

== Taxonomy ==
The species was described by Carl Friedrich Philipp von Martius in 1826.

== Distribution ==
Bactris tomentosa is native to the wet tropical biome of Brazil (Amapá, Amazonas, Maranhão, and Pará), and French Guiana. Its estimated extent of occurrence is 2,015,906.17 square kilometres (778,345.72 sq mi). The species grows in lowland rainforests.

== Description ==
Bactris tomentosa is a shrub or palm tree. The stems are 0.3–3 metres (0.98–9.84 ft) high, 0.8–1.6 centimetres (0.31–0.63 in) wide, and spiny.

The plant has eight to thirteen leaves, which have two to eleven irregularly clustered pinnae on each side. The pinnae are wedge-shaped. The leaves have scattered yellowish spines up to 3 centimetres (1.2 in) long. The leaf stem is 10–28 centimetres (3.9–11.0 in) long.

The flower stem is around 6 centimetres (2.4 in) long, slightly curved, and lacks spines. The male flowers are 6–7 millimetres (0.24–0.28 in) long, and have six to nine stamens. The sepal lobes are 1–2 millimetres (0.039–0.079 in) long. The female flowers are 3.5–4 millimetres (0.14–0.16 in) long. The calyx is tube-shaped, and 3–4 millimetres (0.12–0.16 in) long. The corolla is 3–4 millimetres (0.12–0.16 in) long, and tube-shaped. The calyx and corolla occasionally have spines.

The fruit is black to purplish, obovoid, up to 2 centimetres (0.79 in) long, and up to 1.5 centimetres (0.59 in) wide. The epicarp is spiny, and the mesocarp is juicy. The endocarp is turbinate, and ridged.

== Ecology ==
The butterfly Dasyophthalma rusina feeds on Bactris tomentosa.

== Conservation ==
In 2018, the IUCN assessed Bactris tomentosa as of Least Concern. The species faces no major threats.

== Nomenclature ==
In Portuguese, Bactris tomentosa is known as marajazinho.
