= Demotispa nevermanni =

Scientific classification
- Kingdom: Animalia
- Phylum: Arthropoda
- Clade: Pancrustacea
- Class: Insecta
- Order: Coleoptera
- Suborder: Polyphaga
- Infraorder: Cucujiformia
- Family: Chrysomelidae
- Genus: Demotispa
- Species: D. nevermanni

Binomial name
- Demotispa nevermanni (Uhmann, 1930)

Synonyms
- Demothispa nevermanni Uhmann, 1930; Stilpnaspis nevermanni

Species of beetle

Demotispa nevermanni is a species of beetle of the family Chrysomelidae. It is found in Costa Rica.

== Life history ==
No host plant has been documented for this species.
