= Demotispa tambitoensis =

Scientific classification
- Kingdom: Animalia
- Phylum: Arthropoda
- Clade: Pancrustacea
- Class: Insecta
- Order: Coleoptera
- Suborder: Polyphaga
- Infraorder: Cucujiformia
- Family: Chrysomelidae
- Genus: Demotispa
- Species: D. tambitoensis

Binomial name
- Demotispa tambitoensis (Borowiec, 2000)

Synonyms
- Stilpnaspis tambitoensis Borowiec, 2000

Species of beetle

Demotispa tambitoensis is a species of beetle of the family Chrysomelidae. It is found in Colombia.

== Description ==
Adults reach a length of about 4 mm. They have a dark brown head, while the pronotal and disc elytral disc (except for the yellow apex) are black. The antennae and legs are yellow.

== Life history ==
No host plant has been documented for this species.

== Etymology ==
The species is named after the type location, the Tambito Reserve in Colombia.
