= Pseudimatidium procerulum =

Scientific classification
- Kingdom: Animalia
- Phylum: Arthropoda
- Clade: Pancrustacea
- Class: Insecta
- Order: Coleoptera
- Suborder: Polyphaga
- Infraorder: Cucujiformia
- Family: Chrysomelidae
- Genus: Pseudimatidium
- Species: P. procerulum

Binomial name
- Pseudimatidium procerulum (Boheman, 1862)

Synonyms
- Calyptocephala procerula Boheman, 1862; Demotispa brunneofasciata Borowiec, 2000

Species of beetle

Pseudimatidium procerulum is a species of beetle of the family Chrysomelidae. It is found in Peru.

== Description ==
Adults reach a length of about 4.5 mm. The head, pronotum, scutellum and legs are pale yellow, while the elytra are pale yellow, with a brown transverse band on the middle of the disc. Segments 1-7 of the antennae are yellowish brown, segments 8-10 are black and segment 11 has a black basal half and yellowish-brown apical half.

== Life history ==
No host plant has been documented for this species.
