= Pseudimatidium madoni =

Scientific classification
- Kingdom: Animalia
- Phylum: Arthropoda
- Clade: Pancrustacea
- Class: Insecta
- Order: Coleoptera
- Suborder: Polyphaga
- Infraorder: Cucujiformia
- Family: Chrysomelidae
- Genus: Pseudimatidium
- Species: P. madoni

Binomial name
- Pseudimatidium madoni (Pic, 1936)

Synonyms
- Demothispa madoni Pic, 1936

Species of beetle

Pseudimatidium madoni is a species of beetle of the family Chrysomelidae. It is found in French Guiana.

== Life history ==
No host plant has been documented for this species.
