= Demotispa panamensis =

Scientific classification
- Kingdom: Animalia
- Phylum: Arthropoda
- Clade: Pancrustacea
- Class: Insecta
- Order: Coleoptera
- Suborder: Polyphaga
- Infraorder: Cucujiformia
- Family: Chrysomelidae
- Genus: Demotispa
- Species: D. panamensis

Binomial name
- Demotispa panamensis (Borowiec, 2000)

Synonyms
- Stilpnaspis panamensis Borowiec, 2000

Species of beetle

Demotispa panamensis is a species of beetle of the family Chrysomelidae. It is found in Panama.

== Description ==
Adults reach a length of about 4.5-4.6 mm. They have a yellow head and legs, while the pronotal disc is argillaceous-red and the elytral disc and inner part of the margin of the elytra are red. The six basal segments of the antennae are yellow, segments 7-10 are black and segment 11 is yellow with an infuscate base.

== Life history ==
The recorded host plants for this species are Chamaedorea wenlandiana and Oenocarpus panamanus.

== Etymology ==
The species is named after the type location, Panama.
