= Demotispa monteverdensis =

Scientific classification
- Kingdom: Animalia
- Phylum: Arthropoda
- Clade: Pancrustacea
- Class: Insecta
- Order: Coleoptera
- Suborder: Polyphaga
- Infraorder: Cucujiformia
- Family: Chrysomelidae
- Genus: Demotispa
- Species: D. monteverdensis

Binomial name
- Demotispa monteverdensis (Borowiec, 2000)

Synonyms
- Stilpnaspis monteverdensis Borowiec, 2000

Species of beetle

Demotispa monteverdensis is a species of beetle of the family Chrysomelidae. It is found in Costa Rica.

== Description ==
Adults reach a length of about 4.1-4.5 mm. They have a yellow head and legs, while the pronotal disc is argillaceous, and the elytral disc and inner part of margin of the elytra are argillaceous-red. The basal six segments of the antennae are yellow, segment 7 is infuscate and segments 8-11 are black.

== Life history ==
No host plant has been documented for this species.

== Etymology ==
The species is named after the type location, Monteverde Province in Costa Rica.
