= Demotispa fuscocincta =

Scientific classification
- Kingdom: Animalia
- Phylum: Arthropoda
- Clade: Pancrustacea
- Class: Insecta
- Order: Coleoptera
- Suborder: Polyphaga
- Infraorder: Cucujiformia
- Family: Chrysomelidae
- Genus: Demotispa
- Species: D. fuscocincta

Binomial name
- Demotispa fuscocincta (Spaeth, 1928)

Synonyms
- Himatidium fuscocinctum Spaeth, 1928; Stilpnaspis fuscocinctum

Species of beetle

Demotispa fuscocincta is a species of beetle of the family Chrysomelidae. It is found in Colombia.

== Life history ==
No host plant has been documented for this species.
