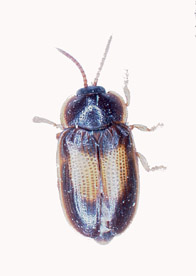

Scientific classification
- Kingdom: Animalia
- Phylum: Arthropoda
- Clade: Pancrustacea
- Class: Insecta
- Order: Coleoptera
- Suborder: Polyphaga
- Infraorder: Cucujiformia
- Family: Chrysomelidae
- Genus: Pseudimatidium
- Species: P. florianoi

Binomial name
- Pseudimatidium florianoi (Bondar, 1942)

Synonyms
- Himatidium florianoi Bondar, 1942; Demotispa florianoi

= Pseudimatidium florianoi =

Species of beetle

Pseudimatidium florianoi is a species of beetle of the family Chrysomelidae. It is found in Brazil (Bahia).

== Life history ==
The recorded host plants for this species are Cocos coronata and Washingtonia filifera.
