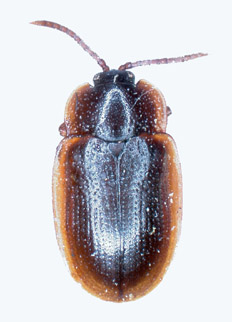

Scientific classification
- Kingdom: Animalia
- Phylum: Arthropoda
- Clade: Pancrustacea
- Class: Insecta
- Order: Coleoptera
- Suborder: Polyphaga
- Infraorder: Cucujiformia
- Family: Chrysomelidae
- Genus: Pseudimatidium
- Species: P. pici

Binomial name
- Pseudimatidium pici (Staines, 2009)

Synonyms
- Demotispa pici Staines, 2009; Cephalolia limbata Pic, 1928; (preocc.)

= Pseudimatidium pici =

Species of beetle

Pseudimatidium pici is a species of beetle of the family Chrysomelidae. It is found in Argentina (Buenos Aires, Entre Ríos, Misiones) and Uruguay.

== Life history ==
The recorded host plants for this species are Arecastrum romanzoffiana and Phoenix canariensis.
