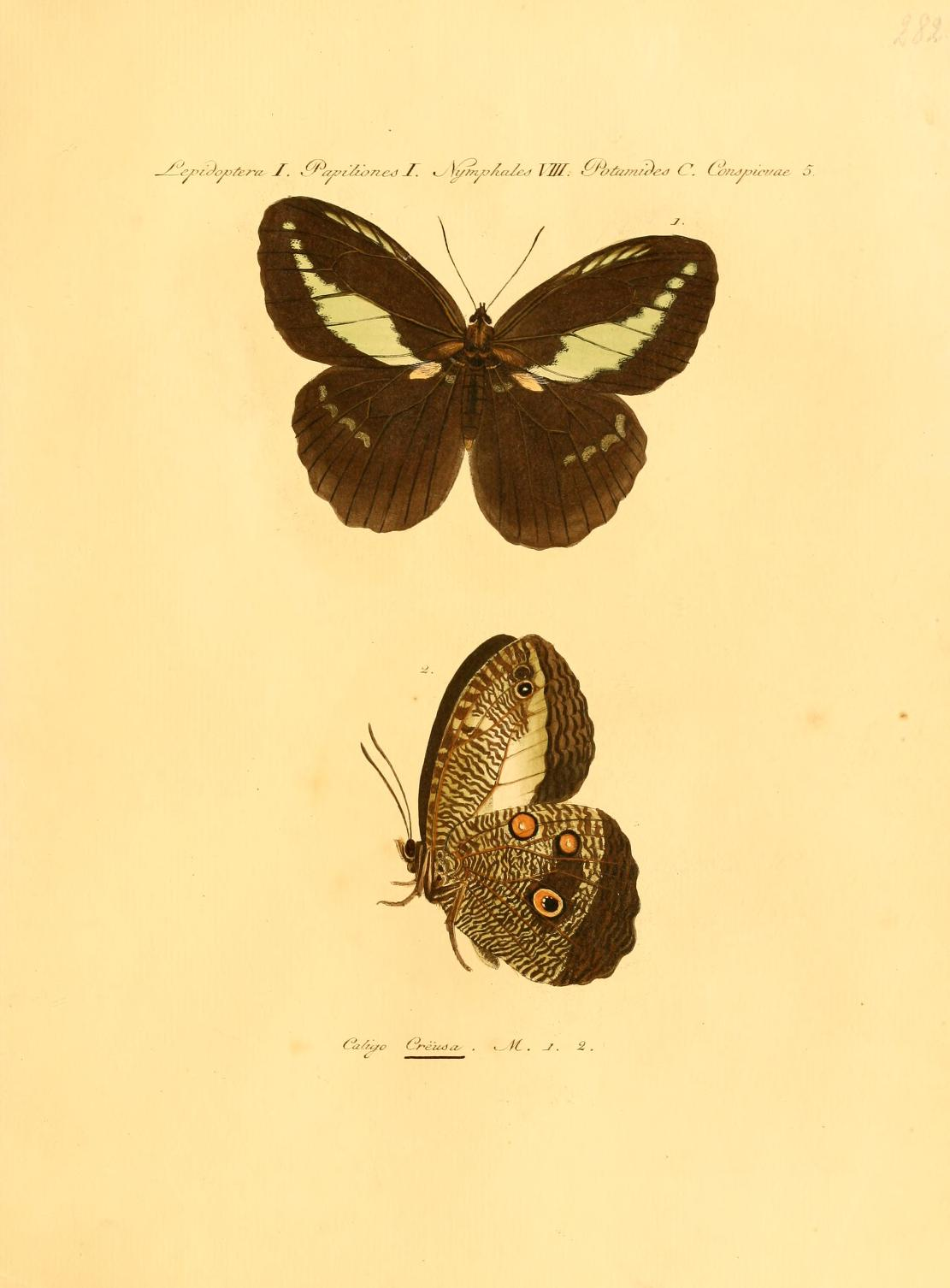
- Male, plate accompanying the original description
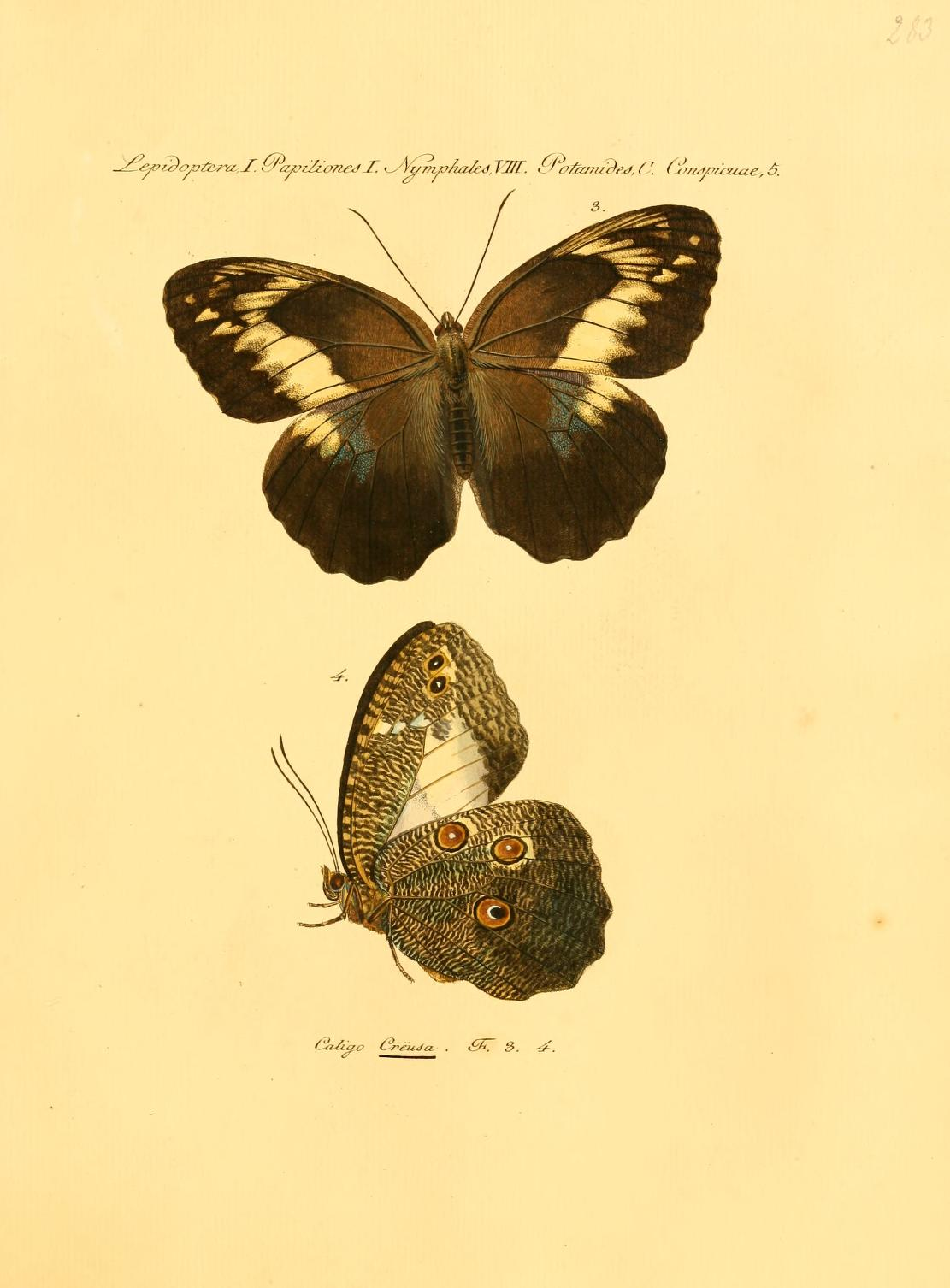
- Female, plate accompanying the original description

Scientific classification
- Kingdom: Animalia
- Phylum: Arthropoda
- Class: Insecta
- Order: Lepidoptera
- Family: Nymphalidae
- Genus: Dasyophthalma
- Species: D. creusa

Binomial name
- Dasyophthalma creusa (Hübner, [1821])

Synonyms
- Caligo creusa Hübner, [1821]; Morpho anasandra Godart, [1824]

= Dasyophthalma creusa =

Species of butterfly

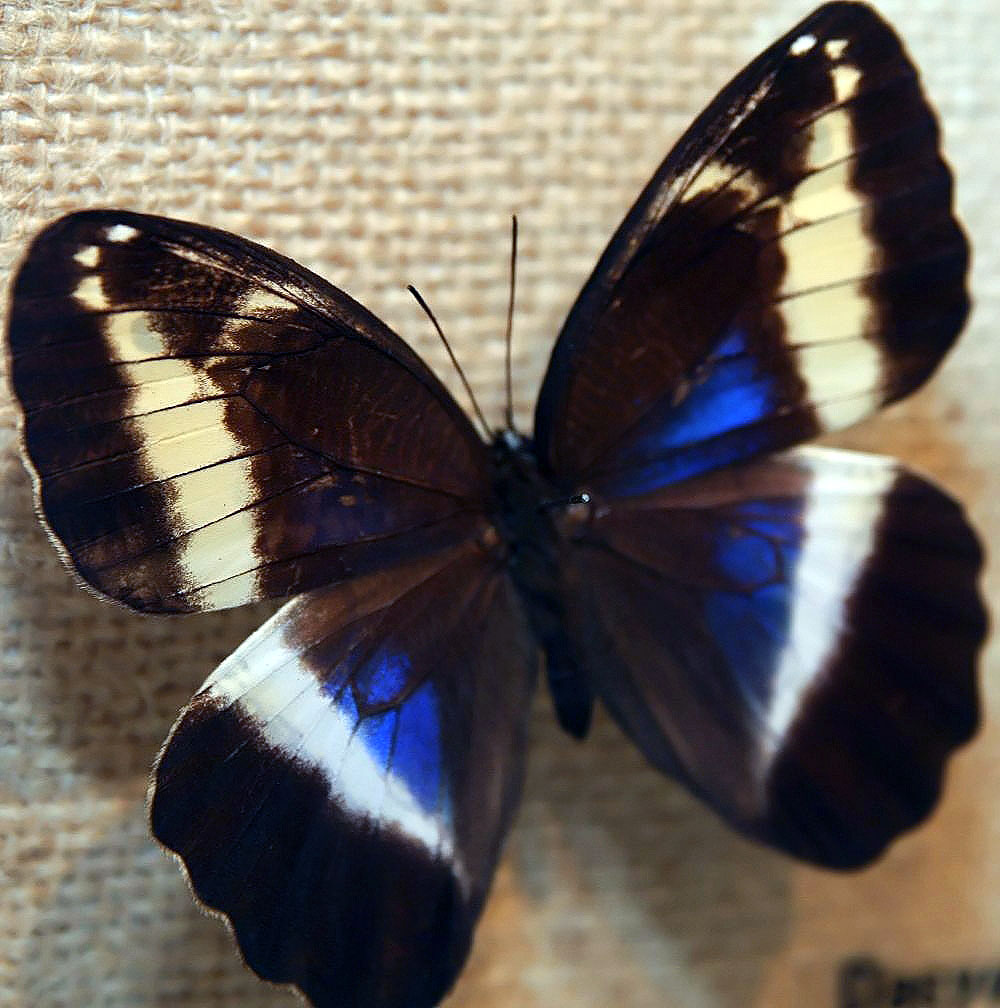
Dasyophthalma creusa

Dasyophthalma creusa is a butterfly of the family Nymphalidae. It is found in Brazil, from Bahia to Rio Grande do Sul.

== Description ==
The upper surface is black, the forewing traversed from the apex to the middle of the inner margin by a bone-yellow gradually widening oblique band. The female, of which we figure the under surface, is considerably larger than the male, with broader bands, beneath paler grey-green. Upper surface: hindwing only with two or three yellowish splashes in the middle of the costal margin. The median band of the forewing more vertical, broader than in the male, less pure yellow, more greenish, connected with the costal border by a transcellular row of indistinct spots. Before the apex of the cell on the hindwing somewhat dusted with greenish. Male with long yellowish hair-tuft at the basal part of the cell of the hindwing.

== Biology ==
The larvae feed on Bactris species, Geonoma schottlana and Astrocaryum aculeatum or Astrocaryum vulgare.

== Subspecies ==
- Dasyophthalma creusa creusa (Brazil)
- Dasyophthalma creusa baronesa Stichel, 1904 (Brazil: Espírito Santo)
