= Demotispa tricolor =

Scientific classification
- Kingdom: Animalia
- Phylum: Arthropoda
- Clade: Pancrustacea
- Class: Insecta
- Order: Coleoptera
- Suborder: Polyphaga
- Infraorder: Cucujiformia
- Family: Chrysomelidae
- Genus: Demotispa
- Species: D. tricolor

Binomial name
- Demotispa tricolor (Spaeth, 1938)

Synonyms
- Himatidium tricolor Spaeth, 1938; Stilpnaspis tricolor

Species of beetle

Demotispa tricolor is a species of beetle of the family Chrysomelidae. It is found in Costa Rica and Panama.

== Life history ==
No host plant has been documented for this species.
