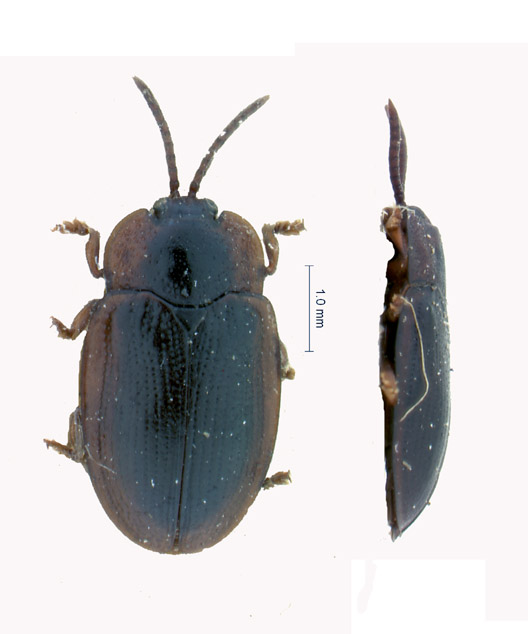

Scientific classification
- Kingdom: Animalia
- Phylum: Arthropoda
- Clade: Pancrustacea
- Class: Insecta
- Order: Coleoptera
- Suborder: Polyphaga
- Infraorder: Cucujiformia
- Family: Chrysomelidae
- Genus: Pseudimatidium
- Species: P. gomescostai

Binomial name
- Pseudimatidium gomescostai (Bondar, 1942)

Synonyms
- Himatidium gomes-costai Bondar, 1942; Demotispa gomescostai

= Pseudimatidium gomescostai =

Species of beetle

Pseudimatidium gomescostai is a species of beetle of the family Chrysomelidae. It is found in Argentina (Misiones) and Brazil (Rio Grande do Sul).

== Life history ==
The recorded host plants for this species are Arecastrum romanzoffianum, Cocos eriospatha, Phoenix canariensis, Washingtonia filifera, Phoenix roebelenii, Pritchardia filamentosa, Phoenix humilis, Phoenix roebeleni and Phoenix dactylifera.
