= Awara broth =

Creole stew with pork, chicken, seafood and vegetables

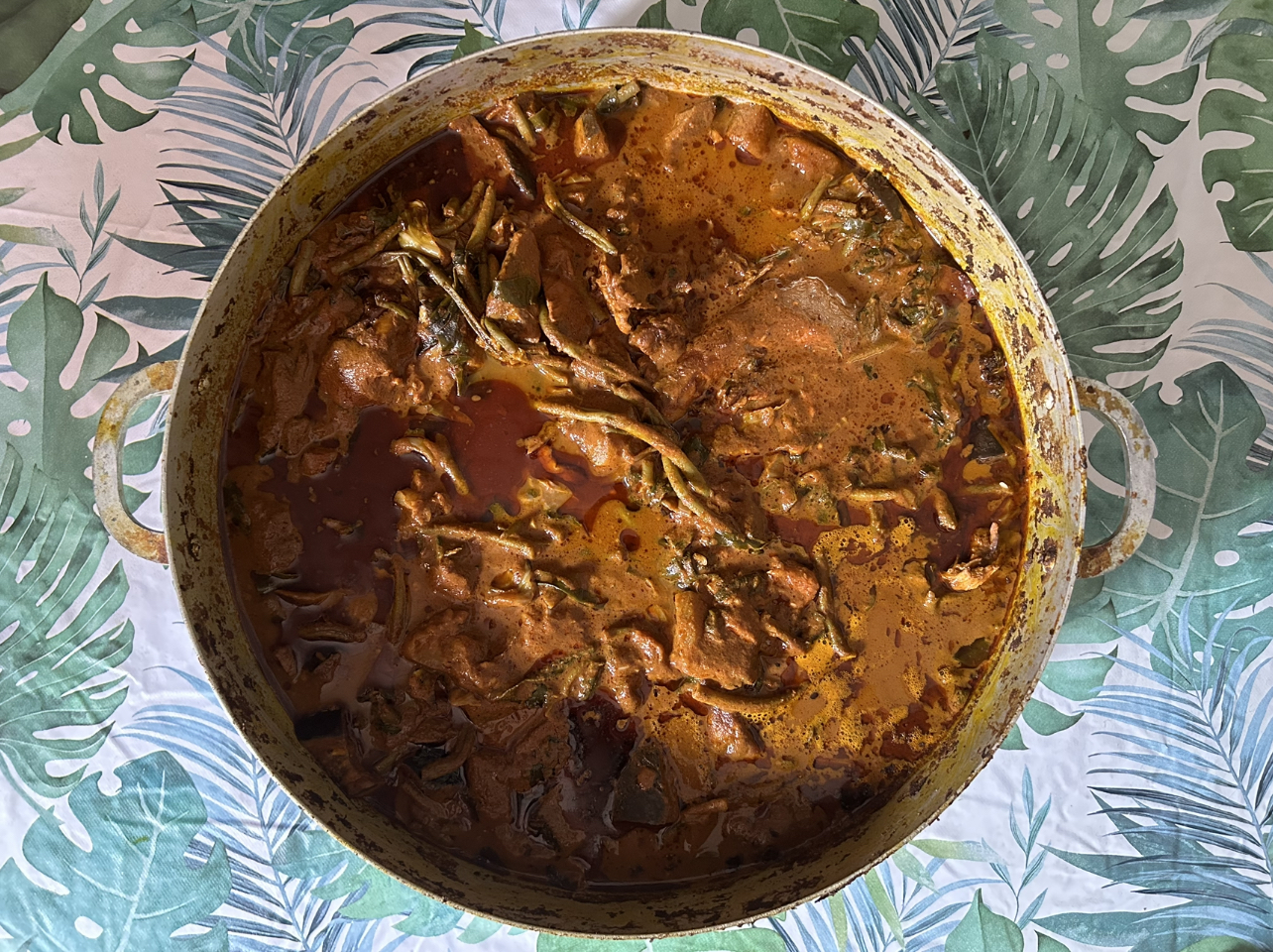
- A pot of awara broth
- Alternative names: Bouyon wara
- Type: Stew
- Course: Main course
- Place of origin: Guiana
- Serving temperature: Hot
- Main ingredients: Awara dough, smoked fish, smoked chicken, corned beef, shrimp, cod, bacon, spinach, chilli pepper, cabbage, cucumber, green bean, eggplant

Awara broth (bouillon d'awara in French and bouyon wara in Guianan Creole) is a typical Guianan Creole stew from French Guiana, made up of many ingredients that are combined with the pulp of the fruit of the awara tree, reduced at length beforehand in a pot. The stew can include salt ham, bacon, salt beef, pork snout, salt cod, smoked fish, fresh seafood like crabs and prawns, roasted chicken and vegetables like cabbage, spinach, eggplant and chile peppers.

The dish is symbolically significant in French Guiana, representing a blending of many ingredients and cultures.

bouyon wara, sorte de pot-au-feu riche de près de quinze ingrédients, long à préparer (le bouillon mijote durant 24 à 36 h), est un symbole de « guyanité ». Il représente, par la complexité des saveurs et des ingrédients qui le composent, un moyen de réunir une population mosaïque autour d’un plat unique dont la finalité festive est recherchée.

bouyon wara, a kind of pot-au-feu made with nearly fifteen ingredients and long to prepare (the broth simmers for 24 to 36 hours), is a symbol of Guianan identity ("guianity"). Through the complexity of its flavors and ingredients, it represents a way to bring together a diverse population around a unique dish, with the goal of creating a festive atmosphere.

This significance is represented in a French Guianan proverb which says, "If you eat bouillon d'awara, to Guiana you will return."

== Preparation ==
The dish is prepared from the pulp of the awara fruit and is typically mixed with smoked chicken and smoked fish.

The stew can take several days to prepare. At the end of the preparation, the awara broth is orange to light brown. It is usually accompanied by white rice.

== Christian holidays ==
Considered a national dish and a sign of hospitality towards guests, it is often prepared for Easter and Pentecost.

== See also ==
- Awara
- French Guianan cuisine
