= Pseudimatidium discoideum =

Scientific classification
- Kingdom: Animalia
- Phylum: Arthropoda
- Clade: Pancrustacea
- Class: Insecta
- Order: Coleoptera
- Suborder: Polyphaga
- Infraorder: Cucujiformia
- Family: Chrysomelidae
- Genus: Pseudimatidium
- Species: P. discoideum

Binomial name
- Pseudimatidium discoideum (Boheman, 1850)

Synonyms
- Himatidium discoideum Boheman, 1850; Demotispa discoideum; Calliaspis rufula Boheman, 1850; Calliaspis punctata Wagener, 1881

Species of beetle

Pseudimatidium discoideum is a species of beetle of the family Chrysomelidae. It is found in Brazil (Bahia, Rio Grande do Sul) and French Guiana.

== Life history ==
No host plant has been documented for this species.
