= Demotispa pulchella =

Scientific classification
- Kingdom: Animalia
- Phylum: Arthropoda
- Clade: Pancrustacea
- Class: Insecta
- Order: Coleoptera
- Suborder: Polyphaga
- Infraorder: Cucujiformia
- Family: Chrysomelidae
- Genus: Demotispa
- Species: D. pulchella

Binomial name
- Demotispa pulchella Baly, 1858

Synonyms
- Stilpnaspis pulchella; Stilpnaspis bicolorata Borowiec, 2000; Demothispa pulchella moesta Weise, 1910

Species of beetle

Demotispa pulchella is a species of beetle of the family Chrysomelidae. It is found in Brazil (Amazonas) and Peru.

== Description ==
Adults reach a length of about 3.5-4.2 mm. They have a black head. The pronotal disc is dark brown to black, while the margin of the pronotum is yellowish-brown. The scutellum is yellowish-brown, as is most of the elytral disc. The antennae are brown to black.

== Life history ==
No host plant has been documented for this species.
