= Pseudimatidium limbatellum =

Scientific classification
- Kingdom: Animalia
- Phylum: Arthropoda
- Clade: Pancrustacea
- Class: Insecta
- Order: Coleoptera
- Suborder: Polyphaga
- Infraorder: Cucujiformia
- Family: Chrysomelidae
- Genus: Pseudimatidium
- Species: P. limbatellum

Binomial name
- Pseudimatidium limbatellum (Boheman, 1862)

Synonyms
- Himatidium limbatella Boheman, 1862; Demotispa limbatella

Species of beetle

Pseudimatidium limbatellum is a species of beetle of the family Chrysomelidae. It is found in Guatemala and Mexico.

== Description ==
The antennae are slender, filiform and more than half the length of the body. The thorax is twice as broad as long, the sides straight and slightly diverging from the base nearly to the middle, then broadly rounded and converging to the apex, with the posterior angle acute. The upper surface is broadly reflexed on the sides, smooth and impunctate on the anterior disc, sparingly impressed with deep punctures at the base and towards the lateral margin. The elytra are broader than the thorax, subquadrate-ovate and distinctly punctate-striate, the striae near the outer limb sulcate. The interspaces are distinctly but finely punctured, faintly rugulose on the anterior disc. The outer limb is reflexed, smooth and impunctate.

== Biology ==
The food plant is unknown.
