= Demotispa rubiginosa =

Scientific classification
- Kingdom: Animalia
- Phylum: Arthropoda
- Clade: Pancrustacea
- Class: Insecta
- Order: Coleoptera
- Suborder: Polyphaga
- Infraorder: Cucujiformia
- Family: Chrysomelidae
- Genus: Demotispa
- Species: D. rubiginosa

Binomial name
- Demotispa rubiginosa (Boheman, 1862)

Synonyms
- Stilpnaspis rubiginosus; Himatidium rubiginosum Boheman, 1862; Demotispa gebieni Uhmann, 1930

Species of beetle

Demotispa rubiginosa is a species of beetle of the family Chrysomelidae. It is found in Costa Rica and Panama.

== Life history ==
No host plant has been documented for this species.
