= Tucum ring =

Wooden ring worn by Brazilian Christians

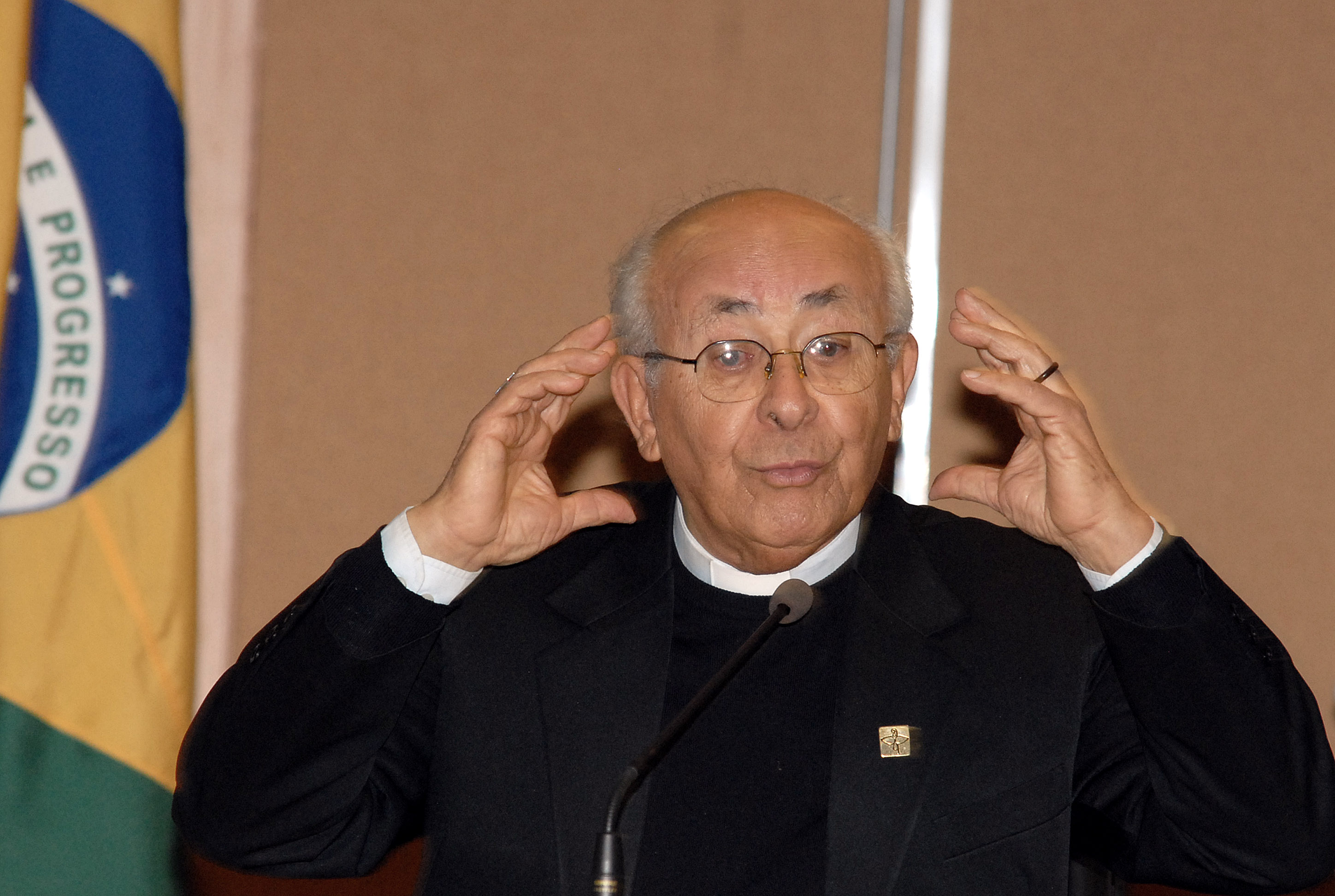
Tomás Balduino, a bishop in Brazil known for his work with natives and the Landless Workers' Movement, wearing the ring on his left hand.

The tucum ring (Portuguese: anel de tucum) is a black-colored ring made with the seed of Astrocaryum vulgare, a palm tree native to the Amazon rainforest. It is worn by Christians in Brazil, especially Catholics, as a symbol of the commitment of their churches to the poor.

The ring originated in the Brazilian Empire, when jewelry made of gold and other precious metals were used ostentatiously by members of the ruling elite to flaunt their wealth and power. Afro-Brazilian slaves and Native Brazilians, unable to afford such metals for making their own jewelry, created the tucum ring to symbolize marriage, friendship, and their struggle for liberation. It was a clandestine symbol whose meaning only they understood.

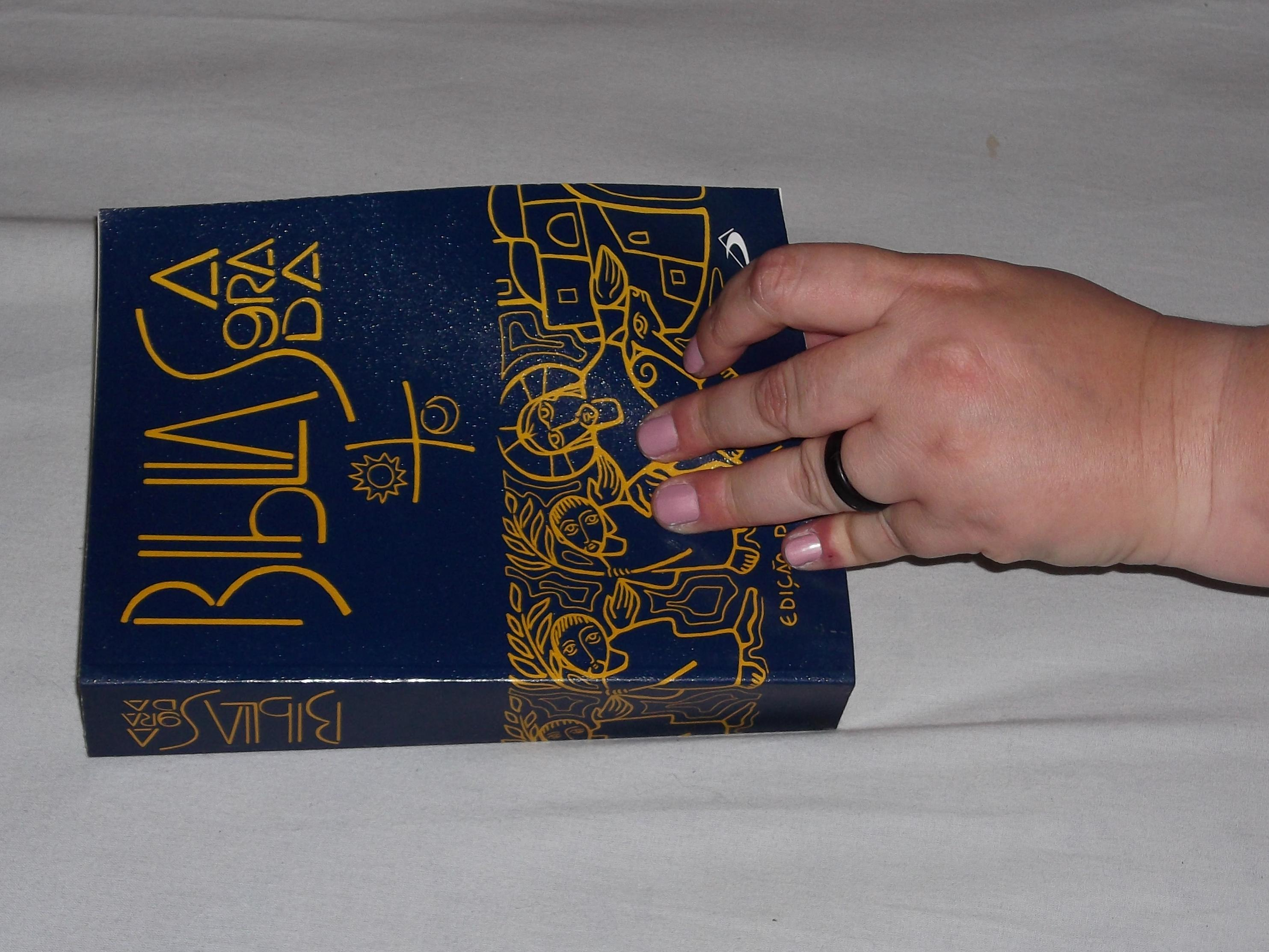
Tucum ring and a Portuguese edition of the Bible.

More recently, the usage of the tucum ring was revived by Christians linked to liberation theology, in order to symbolize the alliance of their churches with the poor and oppressed people of Latin America, especially by Catholics after the Second Vatican Council and the Latin American Episcopal Conferences of Medellín and Puebla.

In 1994, the tucum ring was the subject of a documentary of the same name directed by Conrad Berning. In the film, Catholic bishop Pedro Casaldáliga, one of the interviewees, said the following about the usage of the ring:

This ring is made from a palm tree in the Amazon. It is a sign of the alliance with the indigenous cause and with popular causes. Those who carry this ring took these causes as their own. And its consequences. Would you use the ring? Look, this commits you, you know? Many, because of this commitment, were killed.
