= Pão francês =

Brazilian bread roll

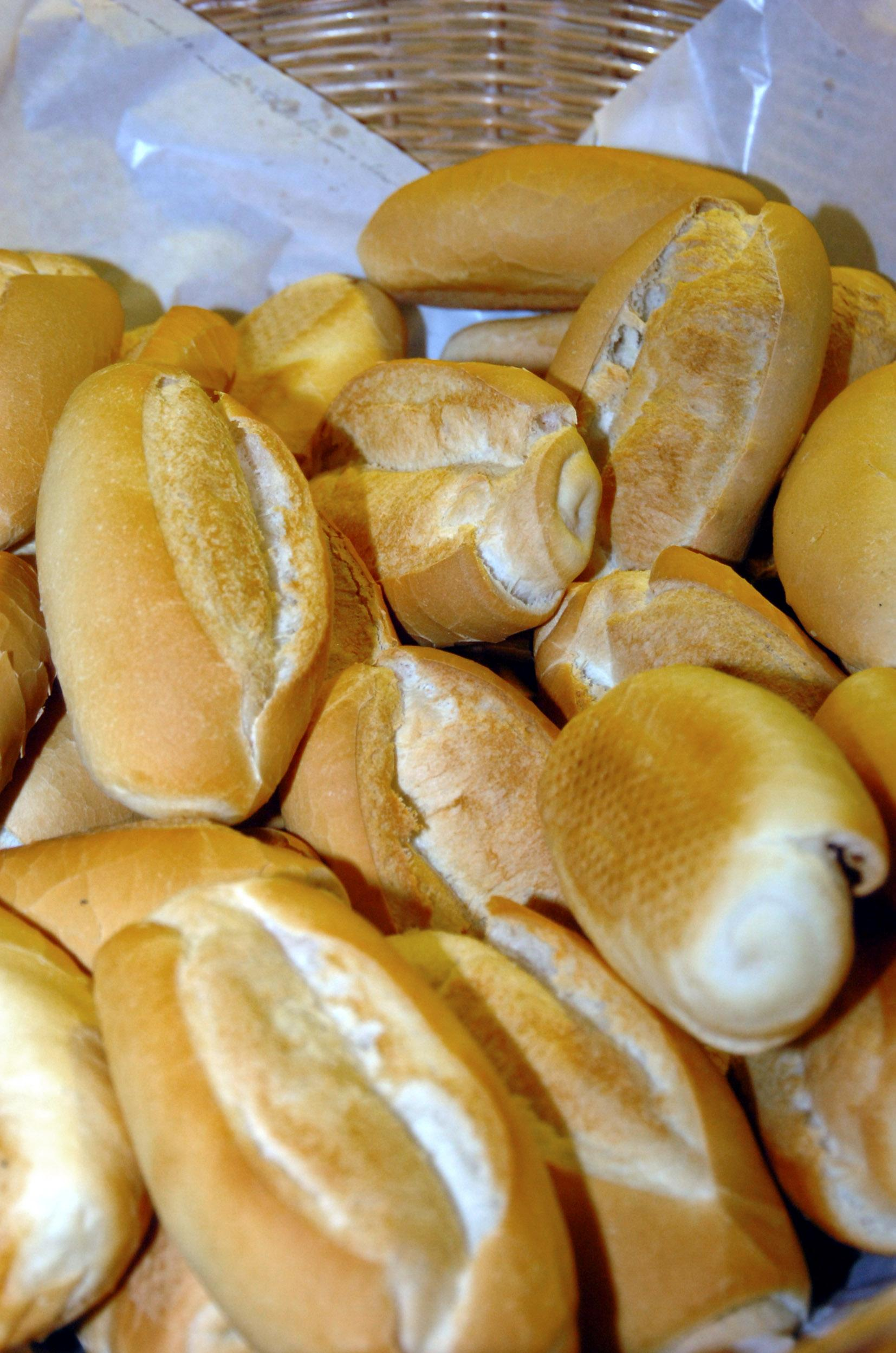
- Type: Bread
- Place of origin: Brazil
- Main ingredients: Wheat flour, water, yeast, salt

Pão francês (Portuguese: [ˈpɐ̃w̃ fɾɐ̃ˈse(j)s]; lit. 'French bread') is a short cylindrical bread roll with a soft white crumb and a golden crispy shell that is popular in Brazil. This bread has different names throughout the different states in Brazil such as pãozinho (little bread), pão de sal (salt bread), cacetinho (little baton), carioquinha (little Carioca), pão de água (water bread), pão Jacó (Jacob bread), pão filão (loaf bread), pão aguado (watery bread), and pão careca (bald bread). It is derived from a French bread called Petit pain.

Pão francês is the most popular bread in Brazil. A 2019 study by Puratos found that 95.7% of the residents of the city of São Paulo eat pão francês. According to Sampapão (the São Paulo Bakery and Confectionery Industry Union and Association), more rolls of pão francês are baked every day in the city of São Paulo than there are residents. (Note: 18 million bread rolls compared to 12.33 million residents.)

March 21 is Pão Francês Day in Brazil.

== History ==
While the exact origin of pão francês is unknown, there are several theories of how it was created. One theory is that pão francês was invented in the 1900s by wealthy Brazilians who asked French bakers to teach them how to bake the baguettes that they encountered in their visits to France. Despite using the same base ingredients, the shape of pão francês differed from the baguettes that they were based on as they were smaller and rounder. A similar theory places the origin of pão francês in the kitchens of the wealthy elite of São Paulo near the onset of World War I. The bread was supposedly created by their personal chefs at the request to reproduce the breads made by the French that the children encountered abroad in their travels in Europe.

One final theory places the origin of the bread much earlier in the royal court of Rio de Janeiro during colonial times. Dom João VI and his court encouraged the import of wheat flour to bake bread, as breads in Brazil at this time were heartier and baked with flour made of yuca, corn, or rye. The bread baked with this French wheat flour would be called pão francês. It wasn't until the early 1900s when imported wheat flour became more accessible and the Matarazzo and Santista Mill opened in the state of São Paulo that pão francês spread throughout the Brazilian Southeast and eventually the entire country.

== Usage ==
As the most popular bread in Brazil, pão francês is eaten at breakfast, lunch, and dinner and can be found in a variety of dishes. Pão francês is the base of many sandwiches, such as Brazilian hot dogs, Bauru, Buraco quente, and X-caboquinho.
