= Pseudimatidium limbatum =

Scientific classification
- Kingdom: Animalia
- Phylum: Arthropoda
- Clade: Pancrustacea
- Class: Insecta
- Order: Coleoptera
- Suborder: Polyphaga
- Infraorder: Cucujiformia
- Family: Chrysomelidae
- Genus: Pseudimatidium
- Species: P. limbatum

Binomial name
- Pseudimatidium limbatum (Baly, 1885)

Synonyms
- Demotispa limbata Baly, 1885; Homalispa limbifera Baly, 1885

Species of beetle

Pseudimatidium limbatum is a species of beetle of the family Chrysomelidae. It is found in Guatemala and Mexico.

== Description ==
The head is smooth and shining and the face is concave between the eyes, the medial line with an oblong ridge. The antennae are nearly two thirds the length of the body and filiform. The thorax is more than twice as broad as long, the sides straight and parallel from the base nearly to the middle, then rounded and converging to the apex. The upper surface slightly convex on the disc, reflexed on the sides, finely but not closely punctured, on the sides of the disc and along the basal margin are a number of large round foveolate punctures. The elytra are subquadrate, the sides rather broadly dilated and reflexed, regularly and distinctly punctate-striate, with the striae on the outer disc subsulcate.

== Biology ==
The food plant is unknown.
