= Bauru (sandwich) =

Brazilian sandwich

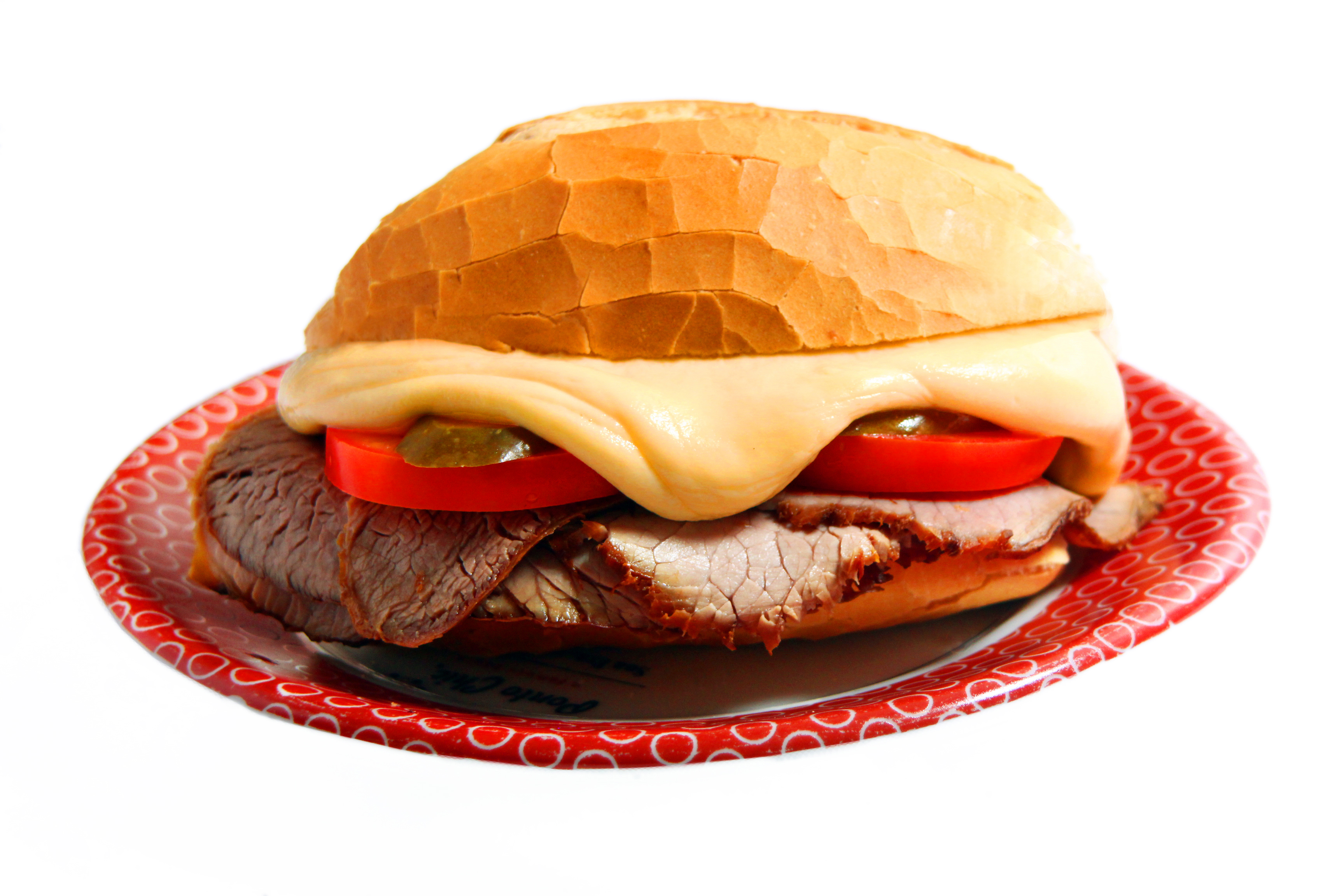
- Bauru sandwich
- Type: Sandwich
- Place of origin: Brazil
- Created by: Casimiro Pinto Neto
- Main ingredients: pão francês bun with crumb removed, cheese (usually mozzarella), roast beef, tomatoes, pickled cucumbers

Bauru is a popular Brazilian sandwich. The traditional recipe calls for cheese (usually mozzarella) melted in a bain-marie, slices of roast beef, tomato and pickled cucumber in a pão francês with the crumb (the soft inner part) removed.

The Bauru has a fairly well-documented history. In 1934, a student at the Faculdade de Direito do Largo de São Francisco, in São Paulo, Casemiro Pinto Neto (known as Bauru for coming from the city of the same name in São Paulo state), entered Ponto Chic, a traditional eatery and student hangout, and asked the cook to prepare a sandwich from his specifications. "Bauru's Sandwich" was an immediate hit, and eventually became the best-selling dish at the place.

Many other eateries, though, offer sandwiches named "Bauru" with different combinations of ingredients—for instance, using sliced ham instead of roast beef or sliced bread instead of French bread. The city of Bauru eventually named the traditional Bauru as the city's official sandwich, codifying the recipe in a municipal law and instituting an official certification program.

== Reception ==
The Daily Meal described the Bauru as "a cheese-lover's dream" in its article "12 Life-Changing Sandwiches You've Never Heard Of".

== See also ==
- List of Brazilian dishes
- List of sandwiches
