= Queijo coalho =

Brazilian cheese

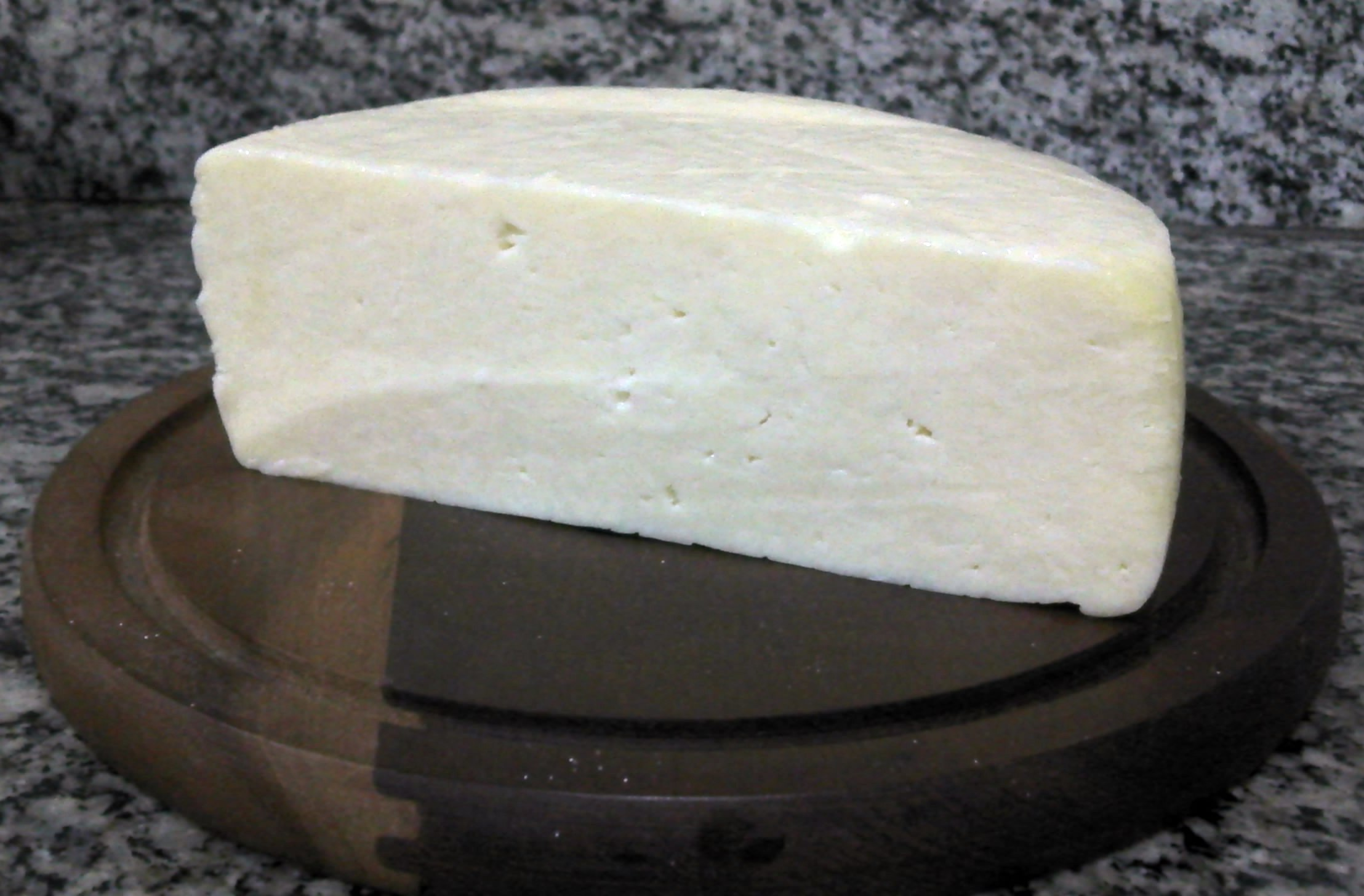
- Country of origin: Brazil
- Source of milk: Cow
- Texture: Soft

Queijo coalho or queijo-de-coalho (Portuguese pronunciation: [ˈkejʒu (dʒi) ˈkwaʎu]; literally "curd cheese") is a firm yet lightweight cheese from Northeastern Brazil. It is known for its "squeaky" texture when bitten into, similar to cheese curds.

It is commonly found at beaches in Brazil's northeast region as a popular and affordable grilled snack, but it is also used in homemade churrasco, where it is grilled over charcoal. Often served with oregano or garlic sauce, when grilled, it is enjoyed on a stick, similar to a kebab, featuring a golden surface with a slightly burnt touch.

== See also ==
- List of Brazilian dishes
- Brazilian cuisine
- Halloumi
- List of cheeses
