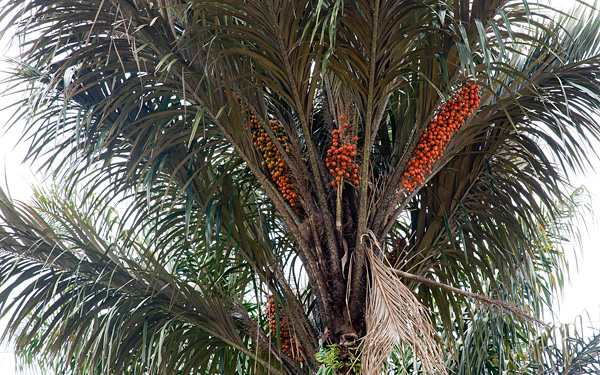

Scientific classification
- Kingdom: Plantae
- Clade: Tracheophytes
- Clade: Angiosperms
- Clade: Monocots
- Clade: Commelinids
- Order: Arecales
- Family: Arecaceae
- Genus: Astrocaryum
- Species: A. vulgare

Binomial name
- Astrocaryum vulgare Mart.

Synonyms
- Astrocaryum awarra Vriese; Astrocaryum guianense Splig. ex Mart.; Astrocaryum segregatum Drupe; Astrocaryum tucuma Wallace; Astrocaryum tucumoides Drupe

= Astrocaryum vulgare =

Species of palm

Astrocaryum vulgare is a very spiny palm native to the Guianas and the Amazon. It is a species which has greatly benefited from deforestation, as it cannot grow in undisturbed rainforest. It is common in the Pará state of Brazil, to the east of the Amazon. This plant has edible fruit.

Astrocaryum vulgare was first described in the book Flora Brasiliensis by Carl Friedrich Philipp von Martius.

== Common names ==
This palm is known by the common names of tucumã or tucumã-do-Pará in Brazil (Portuguese), awara (French) and wara (Creole) in French Guiana, wara awara in Guyana (Guyanese Creole), awara (Lokono, Kalina, Sranantongo) or muru-muru (Paramaccan) in Suriname, chontilla in Ecuador (Spanish).

== Description ==
The tree can grow 10–15 m (33–49 ft) in height, although it is usually shorter. In habitus it usually presents as a few to many trunks, each trunk of the same height and width. The trunks grow 15–18 cm in diameter. By growing multiple stems, it regenerates easily after damage.

The palm is covered in vicious spines, the trunk is densely covered in different lengths of black, flattened spines which grow to 12 cm long, and the infructescence is also covered in black, 1–3 cm long spikes. The spadices are held erect, and the inner spathe is two metres long, sometimes more.

The fruit is an orange-coloured, round or roundish drupe, with a shortly pointed apex. The fruit is contained in a cupule (like an acorn), this is flat, some 1 by 2 cm, and laciniate-crenulate at its margin. The fruit has an oily, fibrous-fleshy, yellow or yellow-orange pulp, On average, the fruit weighs about 30 g (1 oz), and is some 4.5 by 3-3.5 cm in size. It contains a large nut with a very hard woody shell, which is almost black in color. The nut contains an oily white substance. The nut (a pyrene) is usually narrowed to the base and one-seeded, although it may also be globose in shape if it contains two seeds. The shell is 3mm thick.

== Distribution ==
This species is native to French Guiana, Guyana, Suriname and the northern Amazonian region of Brazil. It is common in Pará state of Brazil and throughout the Guianas, being very abundant in the populated coastal regions, as well as extremely abundant in the white-sand savanna belt.

== Ecology ==
It is a characteristic palm of terra firme (rainforest which is never inundated under water), low vegetation cover, and open fields. Astrocaryum vulgare is considered a pioneer plant with aggressive growth, has the ability to grow new shoots after a fire, and mainly inhabits secondary forests and pastures. It is never found in undisturbed old-growth rainforest. In the Guianas it is typically found on rather dry, sandy soil. It is very common in white-sand savanna. The seeds are probably mostly dispersed by capuchin monkeys and scatter-hoarding rodents (agoutis and achouchis). In Guyana, researchers found its inflorescences produce heat and odor during nocturnal anthesis, which draws hordes of different beetles to feed, mate, and oviposition. Although beetles pollinate, wind pollination was also employed, and experiments showed the palm also self-fertilized.

== Uses ==
Seeds take up to two years to germinate, the plants grow slowly in cultivation, and start to produce fruits after eight years.

=== Cuisine ===
In French Guiana, at Easter, Guianans (Guyanais/Guyanaises) eat a traditional dish made with awara paste called bouillon d'awara, or awara broth. It is said that if you eat bouillon d'awara, you'll return to French Guiana. ("Si tu manges du bouillon d'awara… en Guyane tu reviendras.")

In the north of Brazil a sandwich, called a X-caboquinho is made out of the raw tucumã fruit's outer layer, fried bananas, and Queijo coalho on Pão francês, all of which is then grilled, with various regional variations existing. In the same region, the tucumã's orange layer is also eaten raw with or without butter.

=== The tucum ring ===
The seed in the fruit is notably used by indigenous Amazonians to make black rings. In the 1800s, this ring was used as a symbol of marriage for the slaves and natives, who could not afford to purchase gold. In addition, the ring was also a symbol of friendship and of resistance to the established order – the freedom fighters. Now these rings are worn by Catholic missionaries as a symbol of solidarity with the poor and support in the struggle for equality, social justice and human rights.

=== Experimental uses ===
Two types of oils can be produced from the fruit: the oil of external pulp and the seed. 34% of the fruit weight corresponds to the external pulp that has 14% to 16% of the oil when it is raw.

It has been theorised that in the future this species might be exploited as an alternative to oil palm for the production of biodiesel. In one hectare, 400 palm clusters could be planted, each cluster with three trunks. In total, this equals 1200 palm trunks. A mature tree can produce up to 50 kg (110 lb) of fruits per year, which corresponds to 2.5 kg (5.5 lb) of pulp oil and 1.5 kg (3.3 lb) of seed oil. Thus, if everything went well, this could result in 4.8 tons of fatty material per hectare.

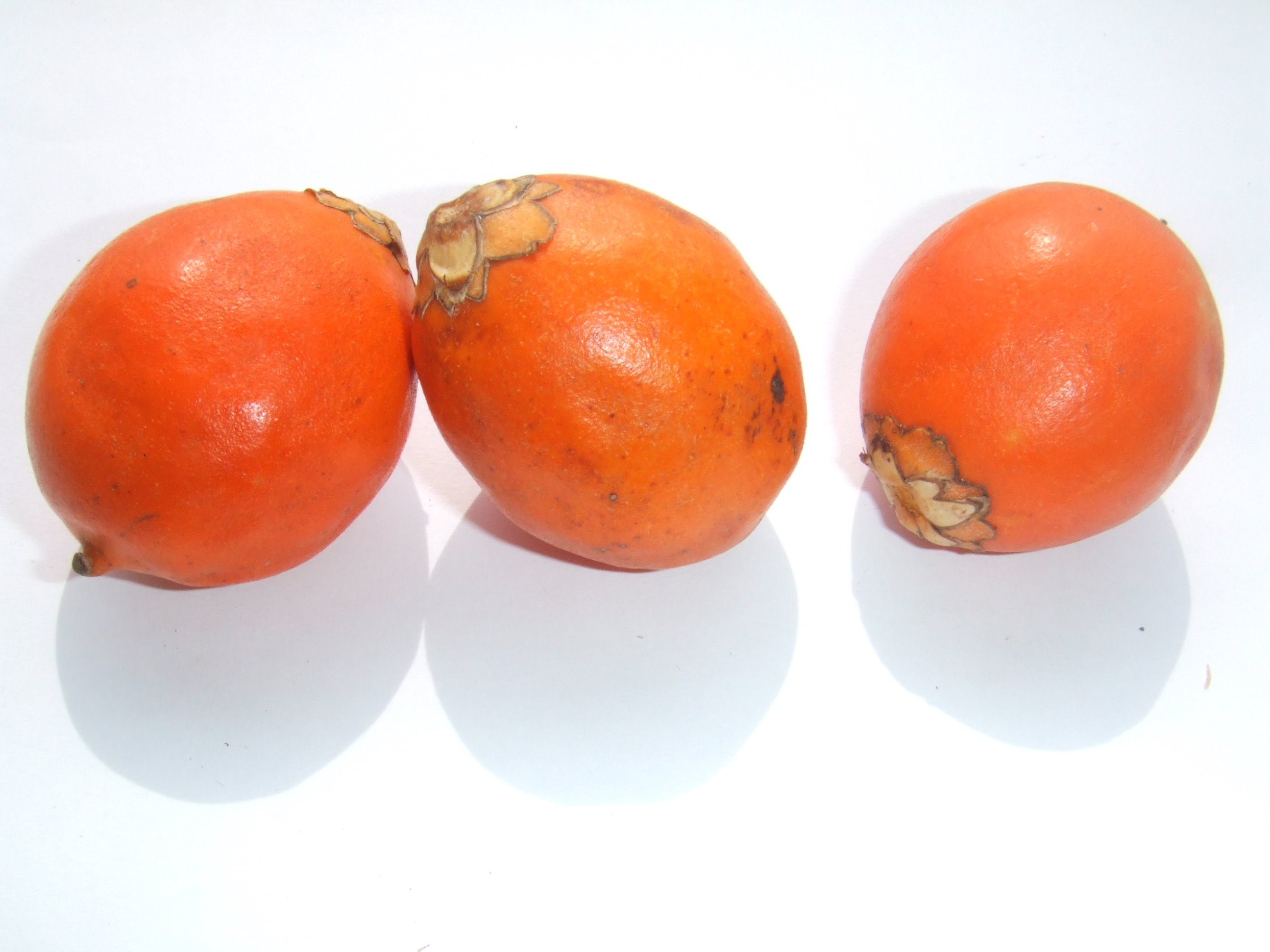
Fruits of Astrocaryum vulgare

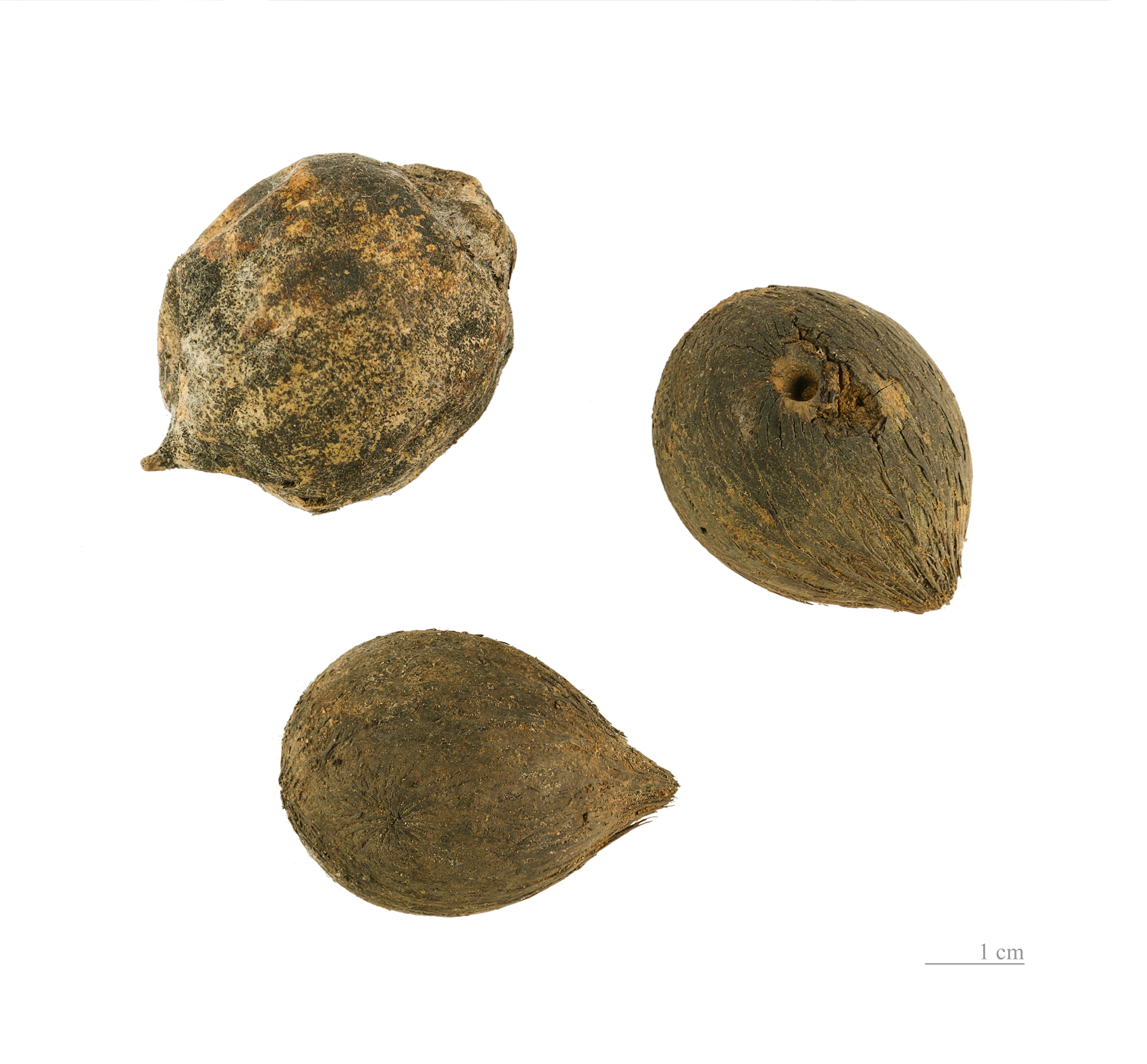
Seeds

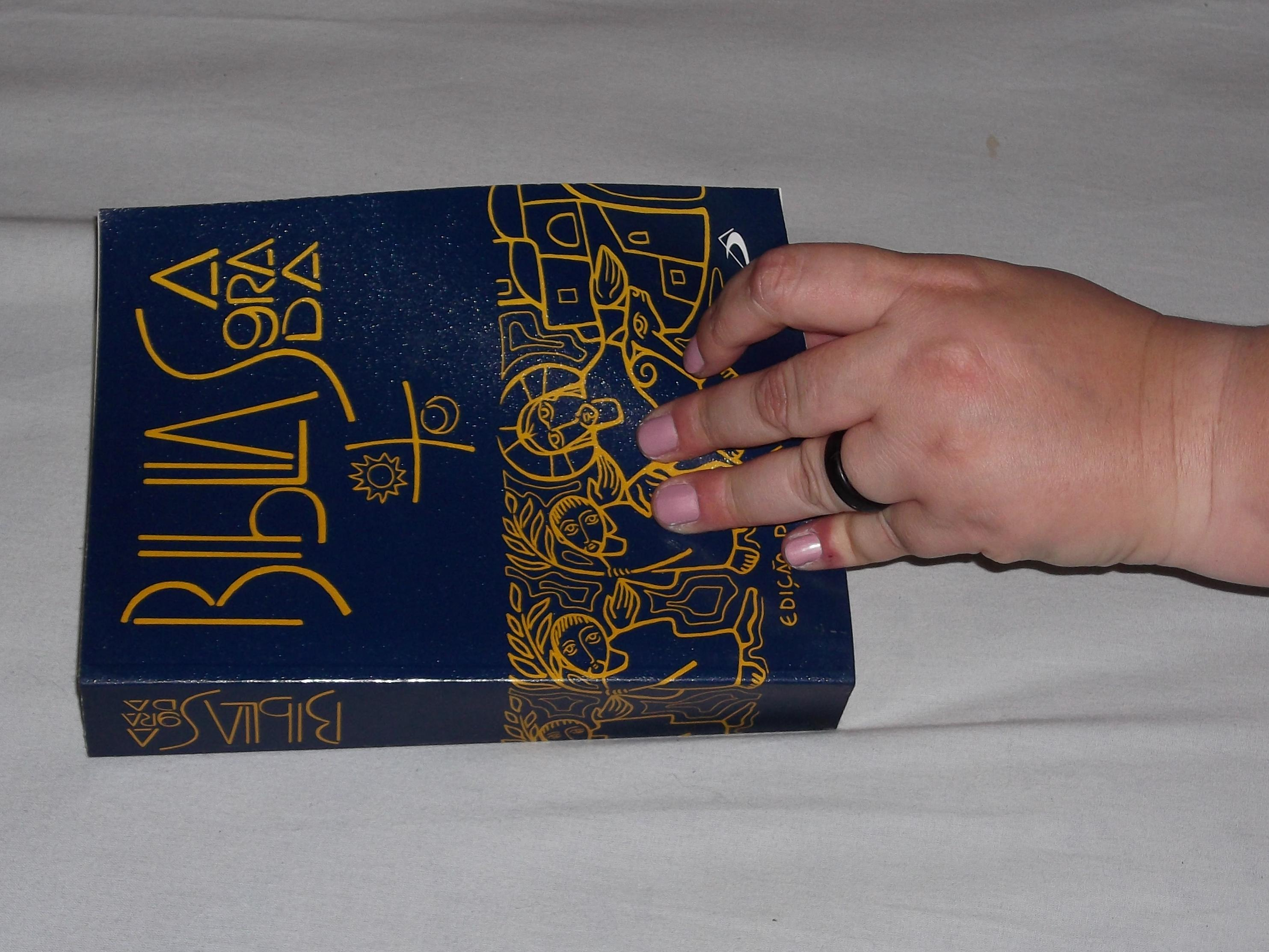
Tucum ring and Bible
