= Fried potatoes =

Fried or deep-fried slices of potatoes

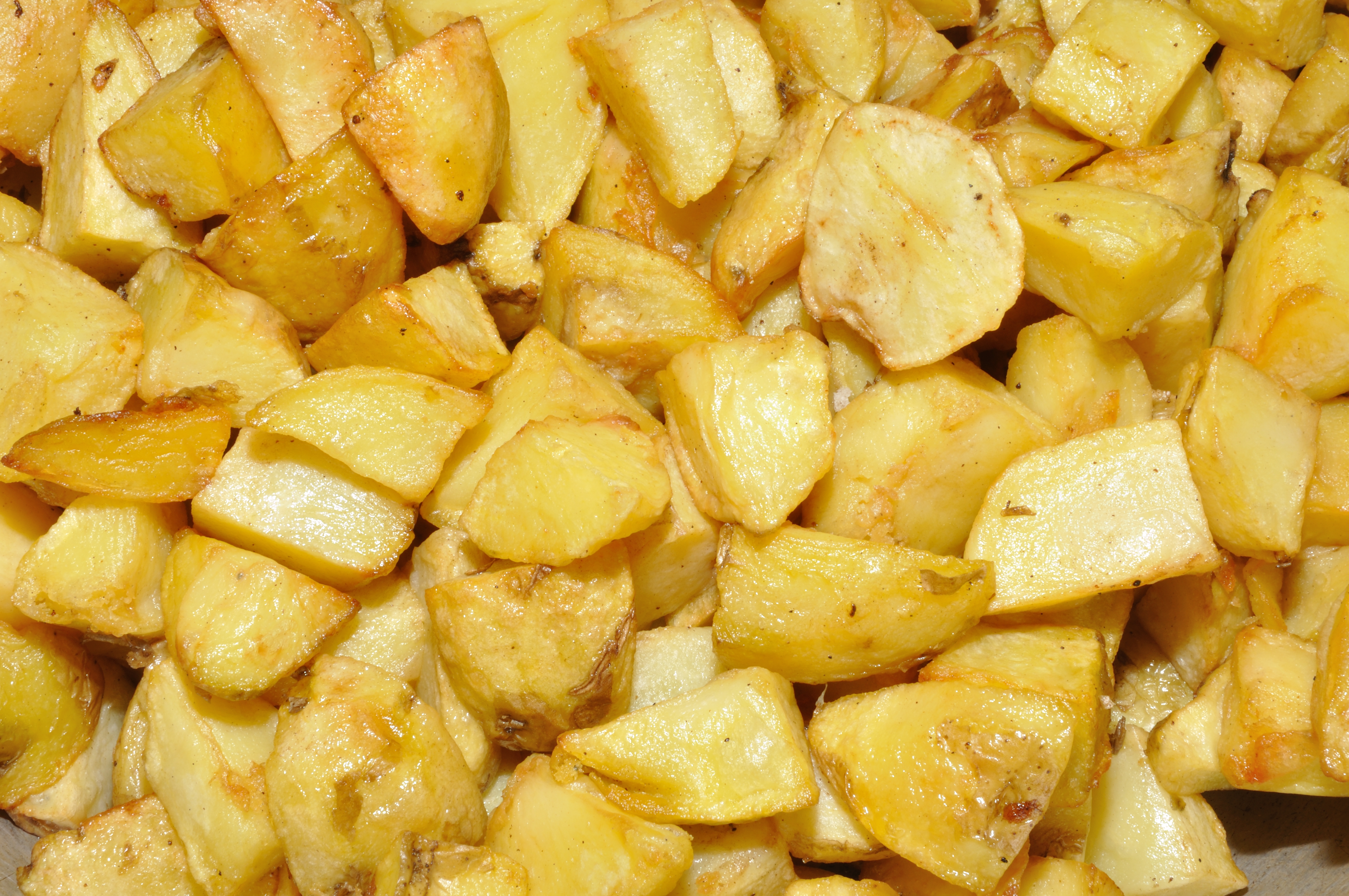
Deep fried potatoes

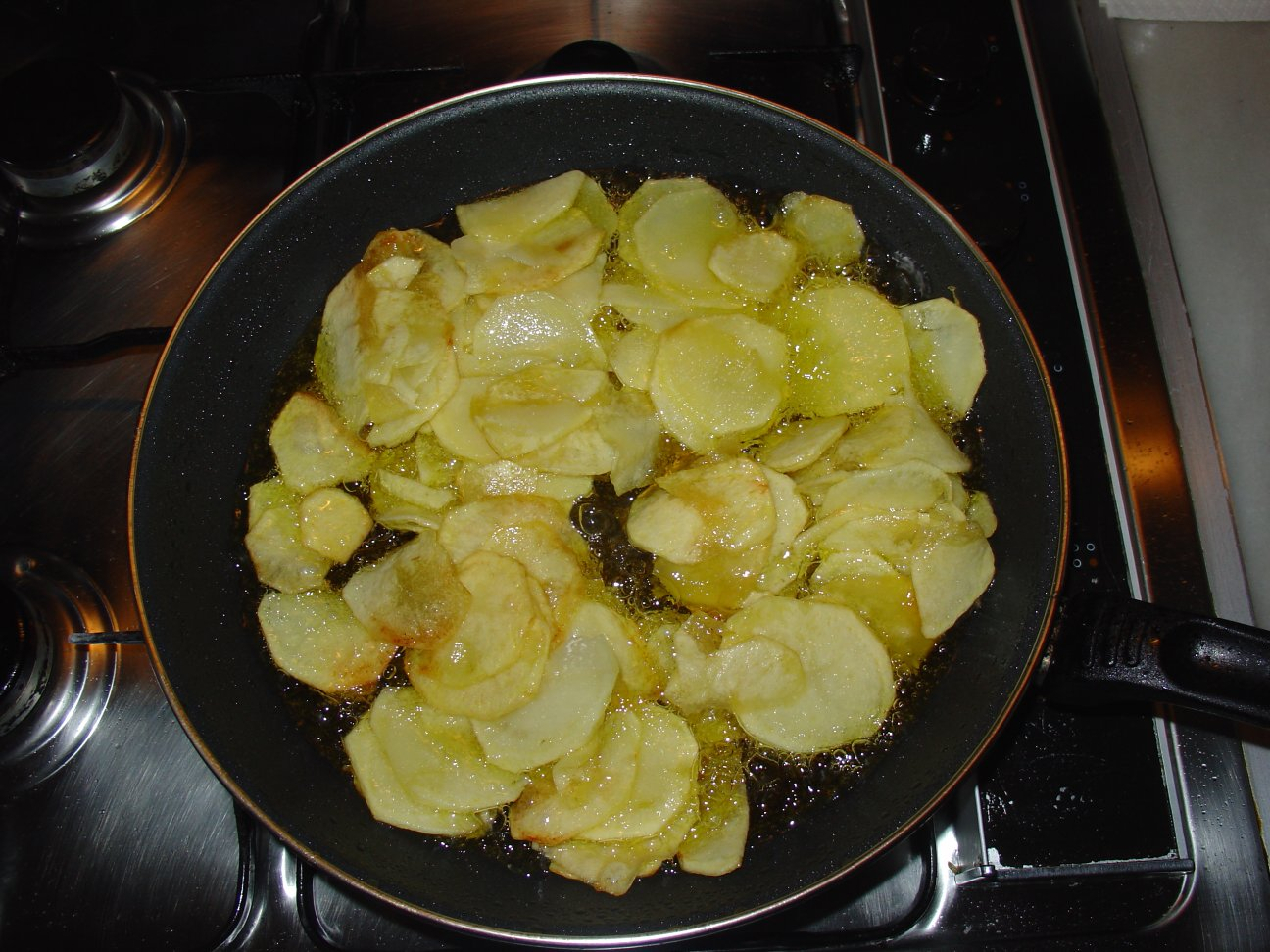
Sliced potatoes frying in a frying-pan

Fried potatoes are a dish or a component of other dishes (such as Bauernfrühstück) essentially consisting of potatoes which have been fried or deep-fried in hot cooking oil often with the addition of salt and other seasonings. They are often served as a side dish.

== Early mentions ==
Although it is common to associate the preparation of fried potatoes with Belgian and French traditions, the oldest reference to fried potatoes corresponds to the chronicle Cautiverio feliz, written by the Chilean military officer Francisco Núñez de Pineda in 1673, which recounts his experience as a prisoner of the Mapuche people in 1629. Therein, it is mentioned that during the exchange of prisoners at the Fort of Nacimiento in southern Chile, the women serving the facility offered indigenous dishes, including fried potatoes. The exact shape these potatoes might have had is unknown, but it is likely they were fried in animal lard or vegetable oil. In any case, the modern form of fried potatoes is considered to have originated in Europe during the 18th century.

== Health considerations ==
Potatoes, French fried in vegetable oil
Nutritional value per 100 g
- Energy: 539 kcal (2,260 kJ)
- Carbohydrates: 63 g
- Dietary fiber: 6 g
- Fat: 29 g
- Saturated: 7 g
- Protein: 6 g
Vitamins and minerals
Minerals	Quantity %DV^{†}
Phosphorus	19% 233 mg
Potassium	31% 930 mg
Sodium	14% 328 mg
- ^{†}Percentages estimated using US recommendations for adults, except for potassium, which is estimated based on expert recommendation from the National Academies.

Acrylamide is formed from asparagine and reducing sugars in potatoes, so choosing potato varieties with lower levels of these compounds can reduce acrylamide formation, along with not refrigerating potatoes and only frying them until they are golden, not brown.

=== Nutrition ===
French-fried potatoes in vegetable oil are 63% carbohydrates, 29% fat, and 6% protein. A 100-gram reference amount supplies 539 calories and is a rich source (20% or more of the Daily Value) of several B vitamins, sodium, phosphorus, and potassium.

== List of fried potato dishes ==
- French fries/chips, also known as “French-fried potatoes”
- German fries (Bratkartoffeln)
- Hash browns – grated or shredded potatoes that are fried in oil
  - Potato cake/patty – further processed hash browns that a pressed into patty-like finger food
- Home fries – referred to as fried potatoes (UK and regional US), it is a basic potato dish made by pan- or skillet-frying chunked, sliced, wedged or diced potatoes that are sometimes unpeeled and may have been par-cooked by boiling, baking, steaming, or microwaving
- Lyonnaise potatoes – a French dish prepared with sliced pan-fried potatoes and thinly sliced onions that are sautéed in butter with parsley
- Papa rellena (English: stuffed potatoes) – a Latin American dish prepared using a baked potato dough that is stuffed with various fillings
- Patatas bravas – a Spanish dish typically prepared using white potatoes that have been cut into irregular shapes of about 2 centimeters, then fried in oil and served warm with a sauce such as a spicy tomato sauce or an aioli.
- Potato chips/crisps — thin sliced potatoes that have been peeled, vacuum-fried/deep-fried in oil and flavored.
- Potato pancake – shallow-fried pancakes of grated or ground potato, flour and egg, often flavored with grated garlic or onion and seasoning.
  - Boxty – a traditional Irish potato pancake
  - Latke – a potato pancake of traditional Jewish cuisine. Often made with matzo meal, egg, potato purée and served with apple sauce or sour cream.
- Potato waffle – can be fried, baked or grilled
- Potatoes O'Brien – consists of pan-fried potatoes along with green and red bell peppers
- Rösti – a Swiss dish
- Perkedel - an Indonesian dish
- Tater tots – grated potatoes formed into bite-sized pieces

== See also ==
- List of deep fried foods
- List of potato dishes
