= Gamja-jeon =

Korean potato pancake

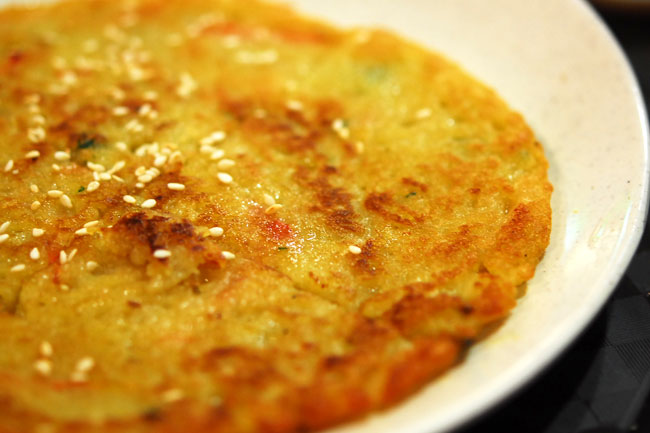
- Alternative names: Potato pancakes
- Type: Buchimgae
- Place of origin: Korea
- Region or state: Gangwon
- Main ingredients: Potatoes

Korean name
- Hangul: 감자전
- Hanja: 감자煎
- RR: gamjajeon
- MR: kamjajŏn
- IPA: [kam.dʑa.dʑʌn]

Gamja-jeon (Korean: 감자전) or potato pancakes is a variety of jeon, or Korean style pancake, made by pan-frying finely grated potato on a frying pan with oil until golden brown.

== History ==
Potatoes may have been introduced in Korea either through the China–North Korea border at Tumen in 1824, or by the German missionary Karl Gützlaff via sea in 1832. The tubers have been cultivated mainly in the hills and mountain ranges of Gangwon Province, with gamjajeon becoming a specialty of that region. Gamjajeon is traditionally made with only potato, salt, and oil.

== Ingredients ==
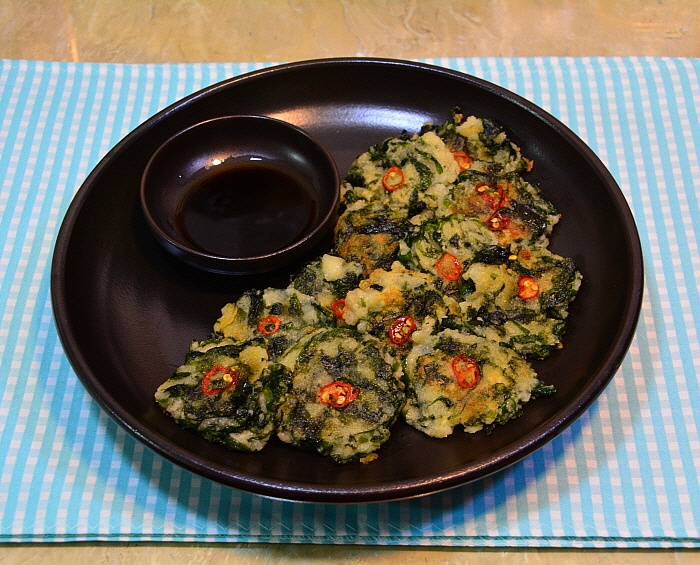
Parae-gamja-jeon (green laver potato pancake)

According to taste, the grated potato may be supplemented with finely shredded potatoes, carrots, onions or scallions, sliced mushrooms, or garlic chives, which adds color and crunchy texture to the dish. Gamjajeon can also be garnished with shredded fresh red and green chili pepper. It is served with a dipping sauce called choganjang (초간장), made of soy sauce and vinegar.

== Photos ==
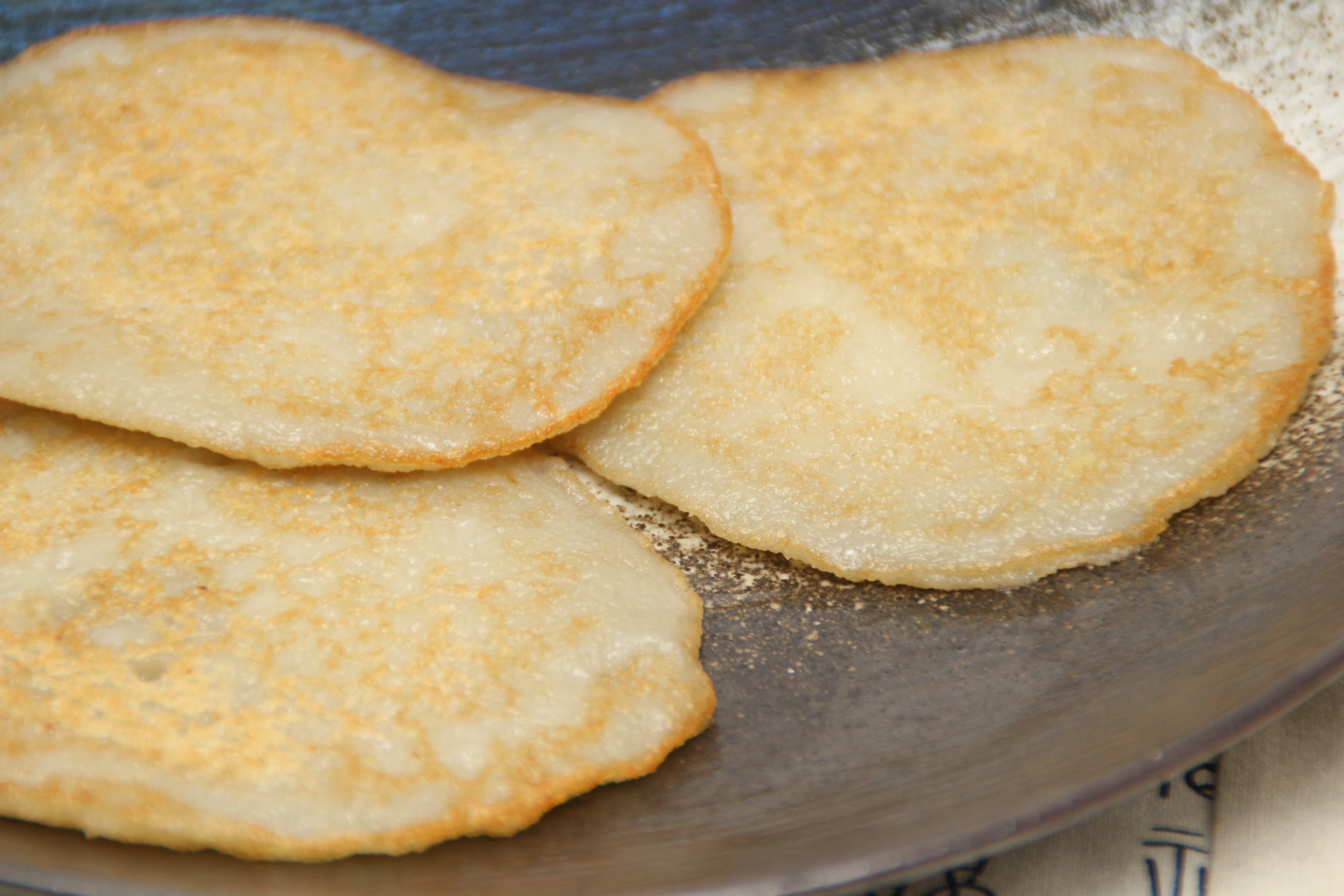
Plain gamja-jeon

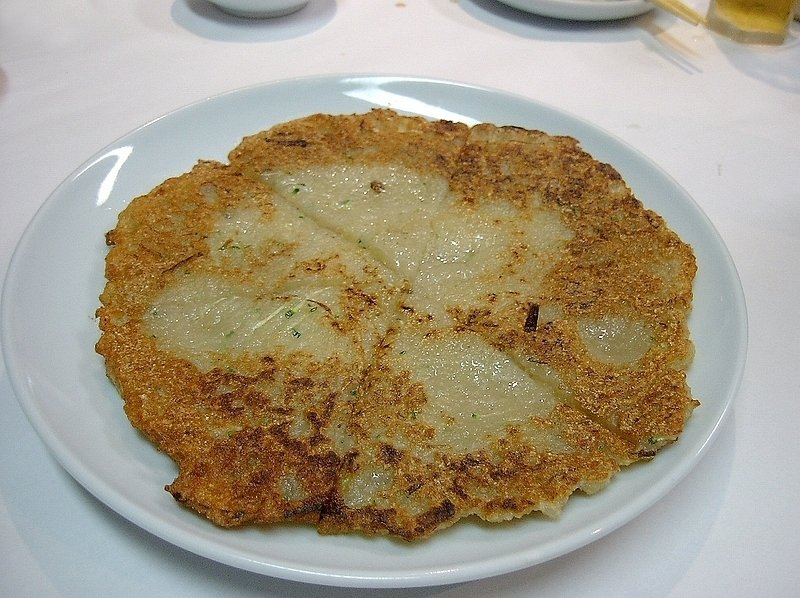
Plain gamja-jeon

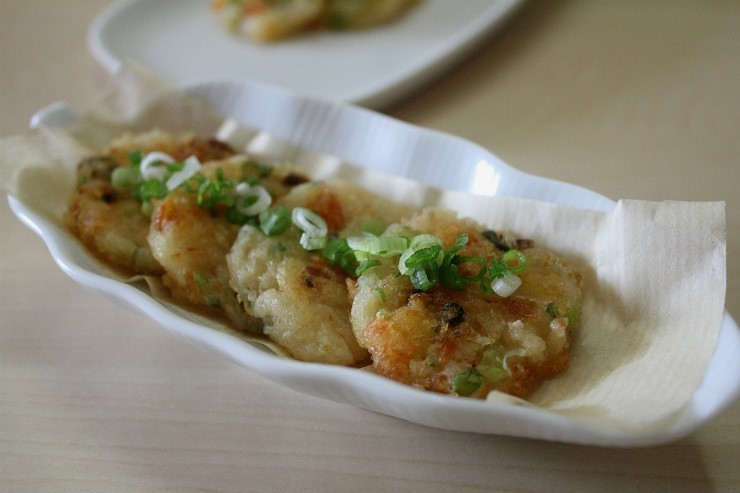
Geon-saeu (dried shrimp) gamja-jeon

== See also ==
- Potato pancake
- Rösti
- Potato cake
- Pajeon
- Bindaetteok
- Boxty
- Kimchi
