= Boxty =

Traditional Irish potato pancake

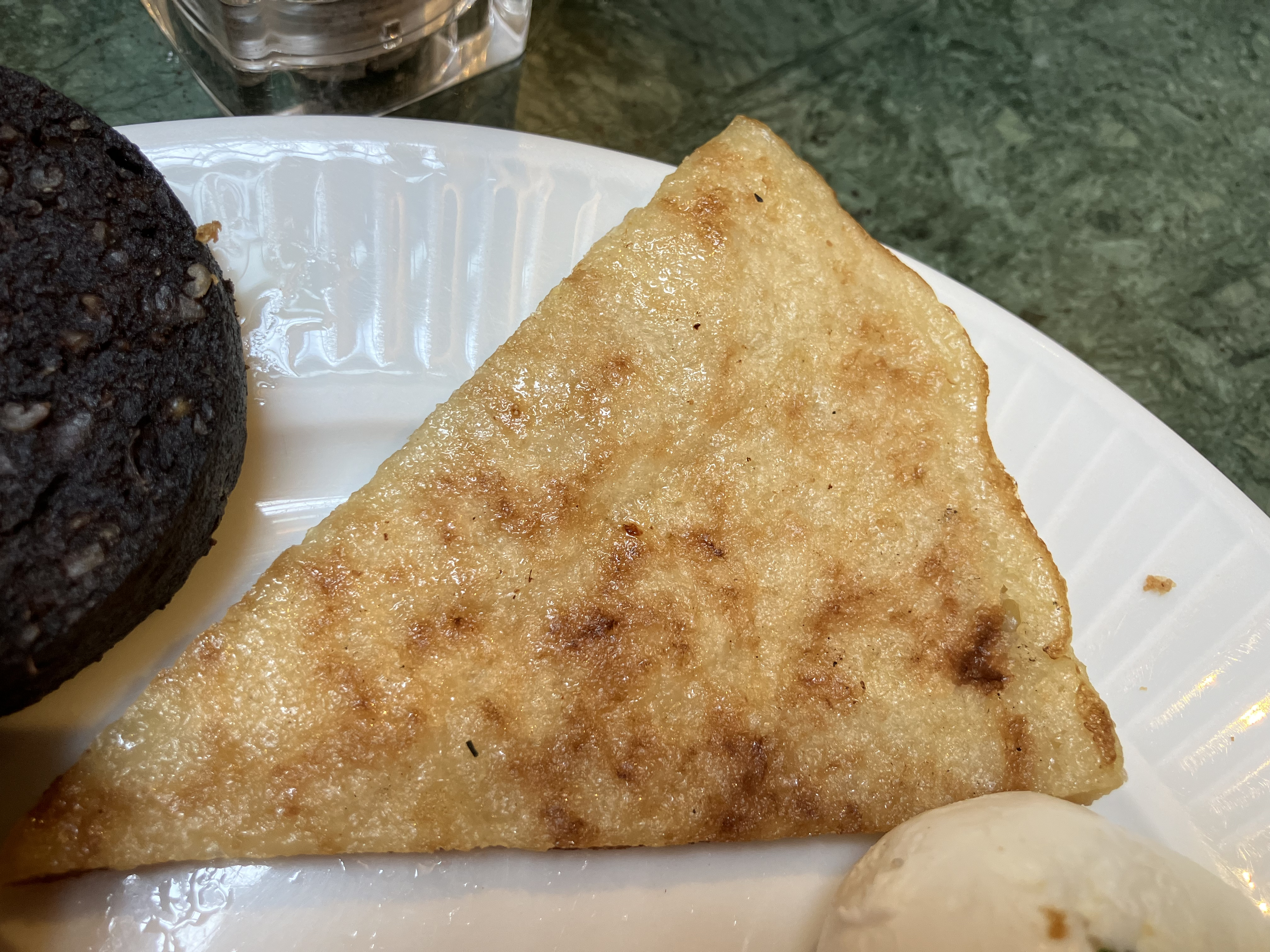
- A slice of boxty served as part of Irish breakfast
- Alternative names: Poundy, poundies
- Type: Potato pancake
- Place of origin: Ireland
- Main ingredients: Potatoes, flour

Boxty (Irish: bacstaí or steaimpí) is a traditional Irish potato pancake. The dish is mostly associated with the north midlands, north Connacht and southern Ulster, in particular the counties of Leitrim, Mayo, Sligo, Fermanagh, Longford, and Cavan. There are many recipes but all contain finely grated, raw potatoes and all are served fried.

The most popular version of the dish consists of finely grated raw potato and flour. The grated potato may be strained to remove most of the starch and water but this is not necessary. The mixture is fried on a griddle pan for a few minutes on each side, similar to a normal pancake. The most noticeable difference between boxty and other fried potato dishes is its smooth, fine-grained consistency.

An old Irish rhyme is: "Boxty on the griddle; boxty on the pan. If you can't make boxty, you'll never get a man!"

As the interest in Irish cuisine has increased, so the popularity of boxty has risen. It is not unusual to see boxty on the menus of restaurants outside the areas with which it is traditionally associated. Boxty may be bought in shops and supermarkets either in the dumpling form or ready-cooked as pancakes.

== Method of preparation ==
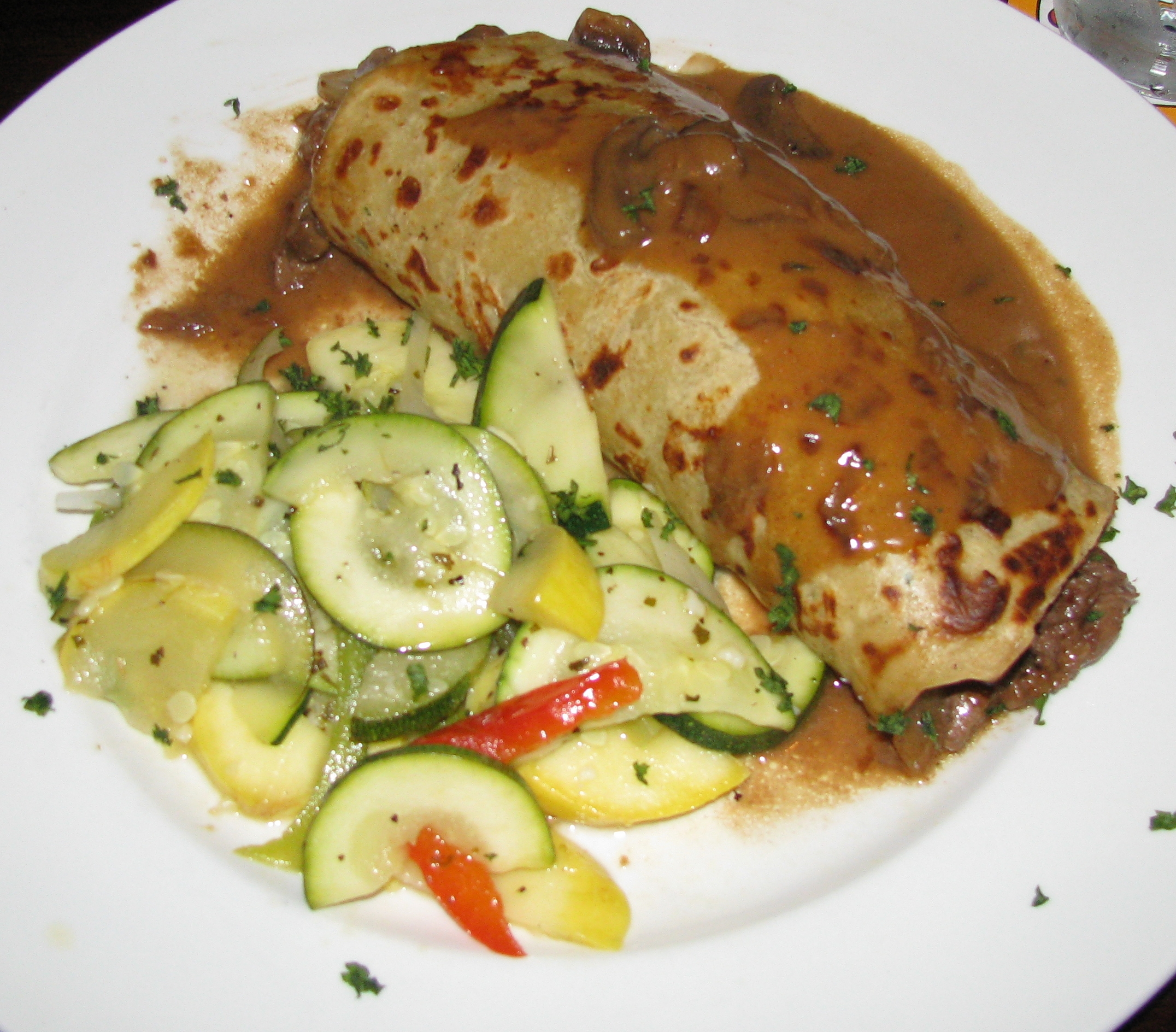
Boxty, in a contemporary presentation served wrapped around beef and with courgettes and sauce

Boxty can be made several ways. When baked in a pan it is sometimes called "boxty bread". Potatoes are grated over cheesecloth and excess water is allowed to drain. It takes around half an hour for the starch to separate and sink to the bottom of the potato liquid. Meanwhile, the grated potatoes are covered with mashed potatoes and when ready, the starch is distributed evenly over the potato mixture. The potato mixture is combined and sprinkled with flour, salt, pepper and melted butter or bacon fat. This "dough" is kneaded, shaped into cakes and scored with a cross so they divide into farls when baked.

Boxty may also be pan-fried like a griddle-cake. It is made the same way as boxty bread, with the addition of enough milk to achieve a batter consistency. Some recipes also add egg yolk or baking soda. It is advised to allow the pan boxty to cool and reheat before serving. The finished pancakes can be served with honey, butter or sprinkled with sugar. They can also be filled with vegetables, meat or cheese.

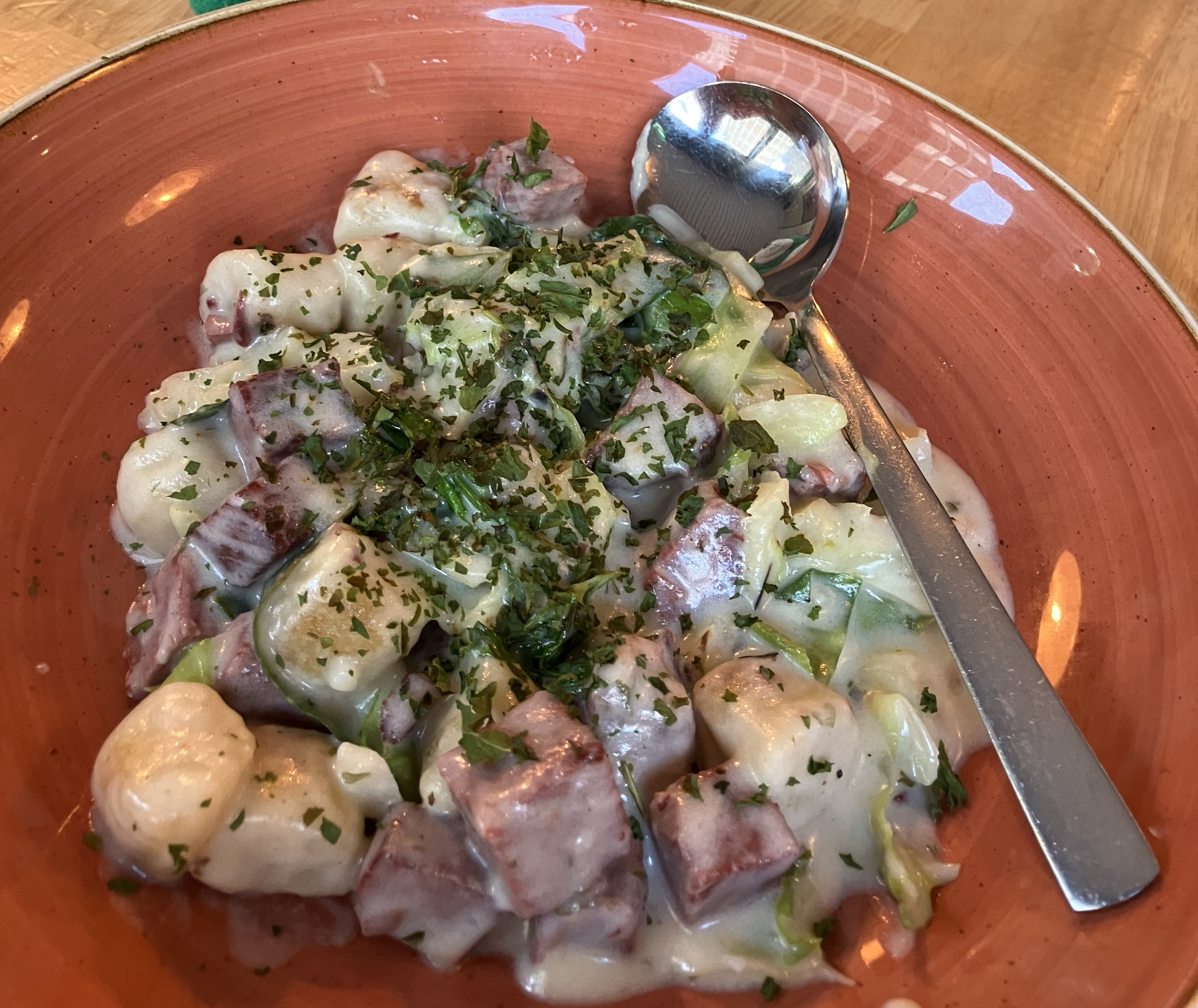
Boiled boxty dumplings with corned beef

Boxty dough can also be boiled like dumplings. This type of boxty is known as "boiled boxty" and is a traditional dish around Halloween in the 'north midlands' of Ireland, especially the counties of Cavan, Leitrim and the southern parts of Fermanagh. Preparation of the dough requires squeezing excess moisture from the grated potato and combining with mashed potatoes and flour and seasoning with salt. The dough is formed into round dumplings known as "hurleys". The hurleys are dropped into a pot of boiling water and boiled for over half an hour, then removed and stored for later. When ready to be eaten, the hurleys are sliced and the slices are pan-fried in butter. Modern variations can include currants and raisins, or service with cornflour sauce like steamed pudding.

The traditional preparation known from an 1854 edition of Dublin University Magazine was made by mixing potato with either flour or oatmeal and adding animal fat or butter to form a cake. Potato graters were made from tin cans. With the addition of egg yolk, butter and milk, it is possible to roll the dough to 5/8 of an inch thick for cooking on a griddle. Boxty was most popular served with a smear of butter for tea but was also eaten for breakfast.

== St. Brigid's Day ==
In Ireland, St. Brigid is the patron saint of dairy and she is associated with milk, butter, ale, cheese and bacon. Boxty is served for St Brigid's Day with other traditional foods like cross-shaped oat bread and Bride bannocks.

== Etymology ==
Likely Irish, possibly from the Irish arán bocht tí meaning "poor house bread" or bácús meaning "bakehouse".

== See also ==
- Colcannon
- Ulster fry
- Full breakfast
- Hash brown
- Latke
- List of Irish dishes
- Northern Irish cuisine
- Potato bread
- Potato cake
- Potato waffle
- Rösti
