= Hash cakes =

Hash cakes may refer to:

- Hash browns, a fried potato breakfast food
- Cannabis edible, a food prepared from cannabis extract
