= Potato cake =

Various cake-shaped potato dishes

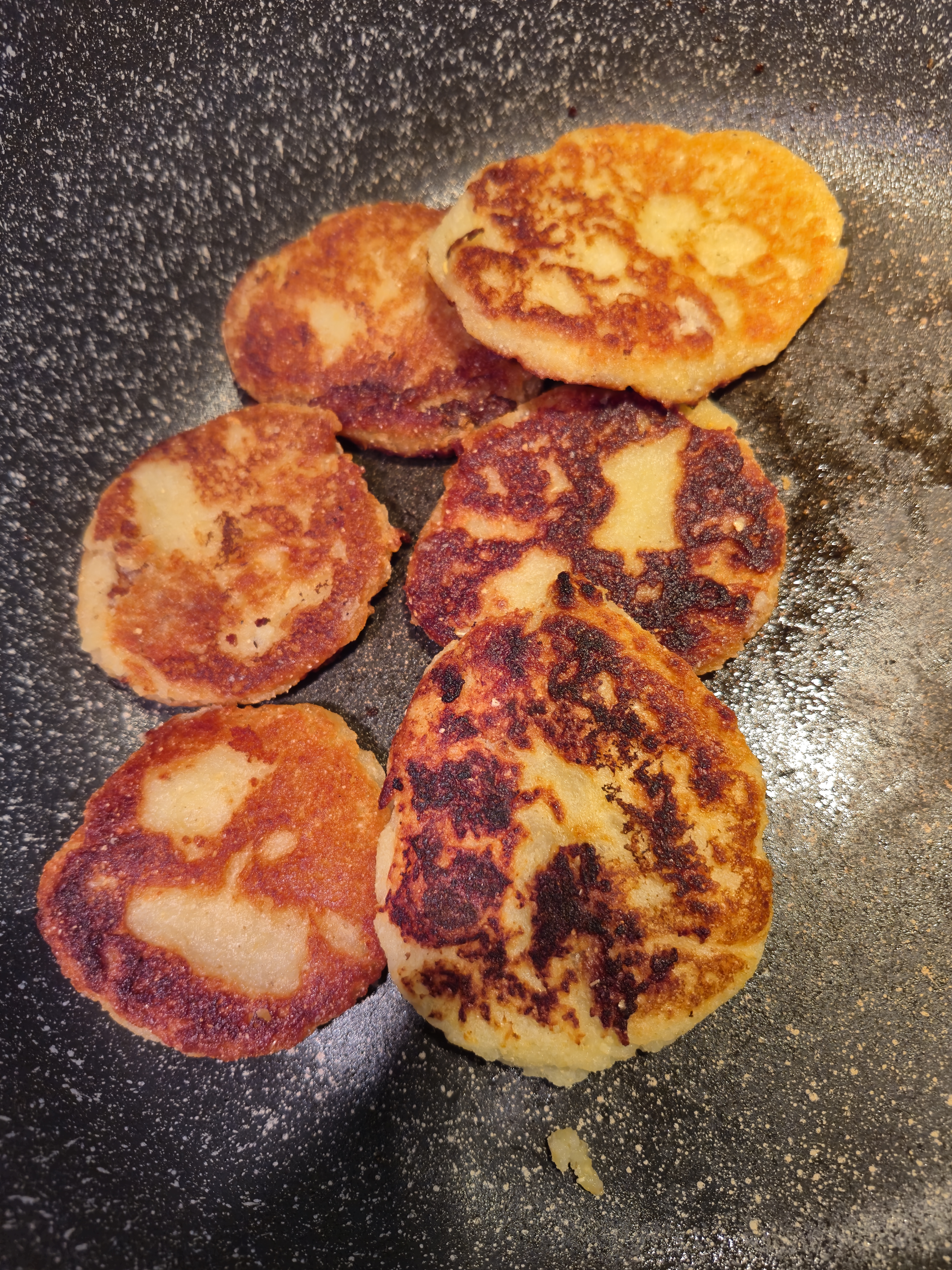
Potato cakes, an Eastern Tennessee instance

Potato cake is a name given to various shaped potato dishes around the world, including a patty of hashed potatoes, a fried patty of mashed potato, a fried and battered slice of potato, or a flatbread made with mashed potato and flour. In Northern England and some states in Australia, a thin slice of potato that is battered and deep-fried may be called a potato scallop. In other parts of Australia, and New Zealand, the terms potato cake, potato flip and potato fritter may be used.

== Hashed potatoes ==
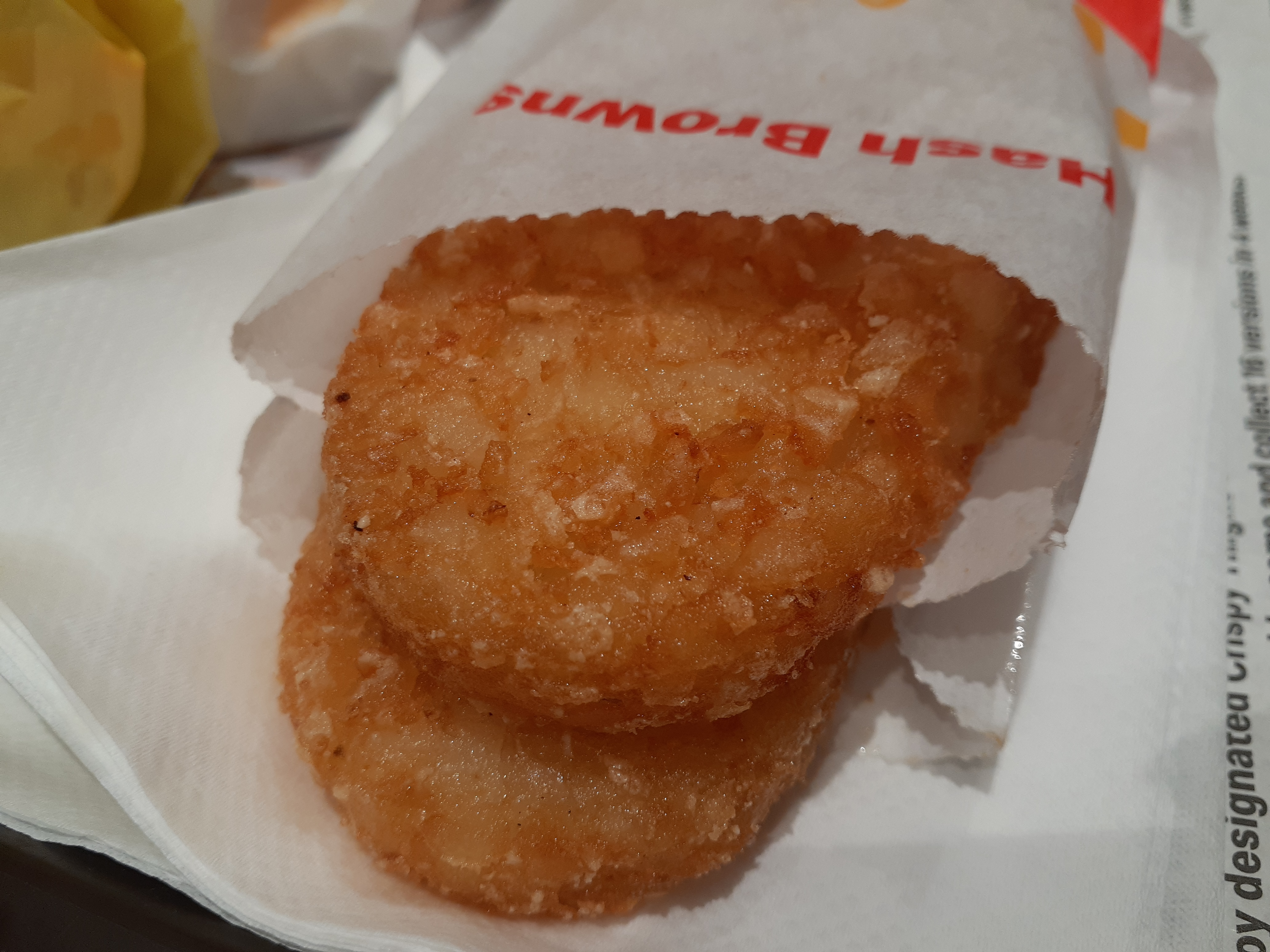
An American potato cake, also referred to as a potato patty or hash brown

In parts of England and North America, a potato cake is a patty of hashed potatoes, a kind of rösti or hash brown. These are available both fresh and frozen in supermarkets, and are served by many restaurants, such as fast food restaurants like McDonald's and Whataburger, often as part of the breakfast menu. The term can also refer to a sort of potato pancake.

== Potato scallops/potato cakes ==
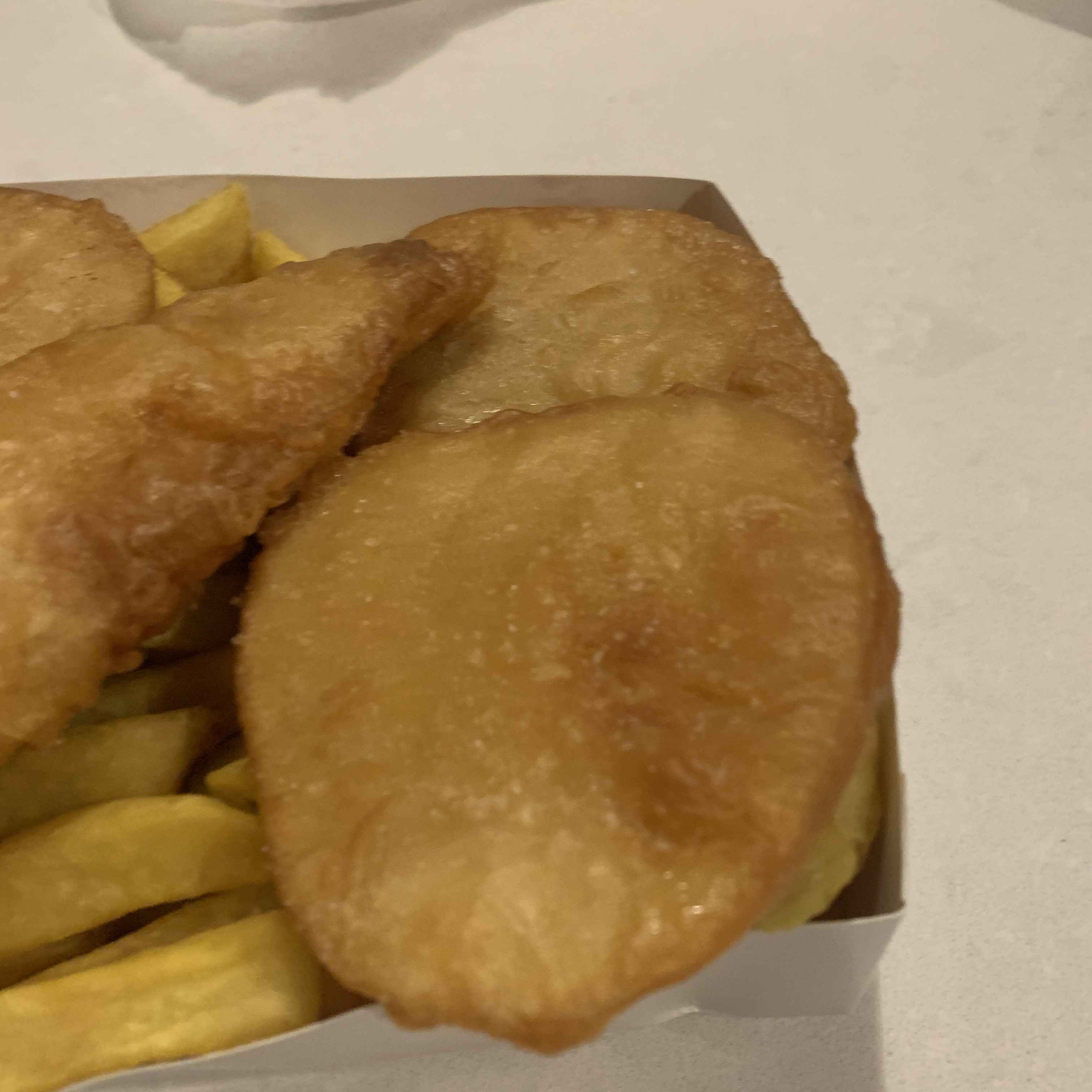
Australian potato scallop / potato cake

In Australia and England, potato scallops are thin slices of potato that have been battered and deep-fried. The terminology used in Australia differs from state to state. In Victoria, Tasmania, and the Murray River regions of New South Wales, they are usually referred to as potato cakes. In the eastern and northern regions of New South Wales, Queensland, and the Australian Capital Territory, they are usually called "potato scallops" (and, to avoid confusion, scallops eaten as seafood may be known as "sea scallops"). In South Australia and in New Zealand, potato fritter is most common, while in Western Australia and the Northern Territory both are used.

Potato scallops are typically called "scollops" in northern and central England, and "fritters" in other areas. This variant is normally a thin slice of potato, dipped in batter and deep fried, with no additional flavouring added except salt and vinegar. This type of "potato scallop" is also found in New Zealand fish and chip shops, where it is referred to as a potato fritter. More commonly in New Zealand, a potato scallop is made from either mashed or grated potato and is not covered in batter or deep fried. Hash browns, which are also widely available, are distinctly different. In Scotland, thin slices of potato covered in beer batter are known as potato fritters and commonly sold in chip shops. When sold in fish and chip shops, they are often bought in place of chips and may be served in a soft bread roll as a scallop butty.

The term may refer to a preparation of mashed potatoes baked in the form of pie or a scallop made using potatoes or potato flour.

== UK and Ireland ==
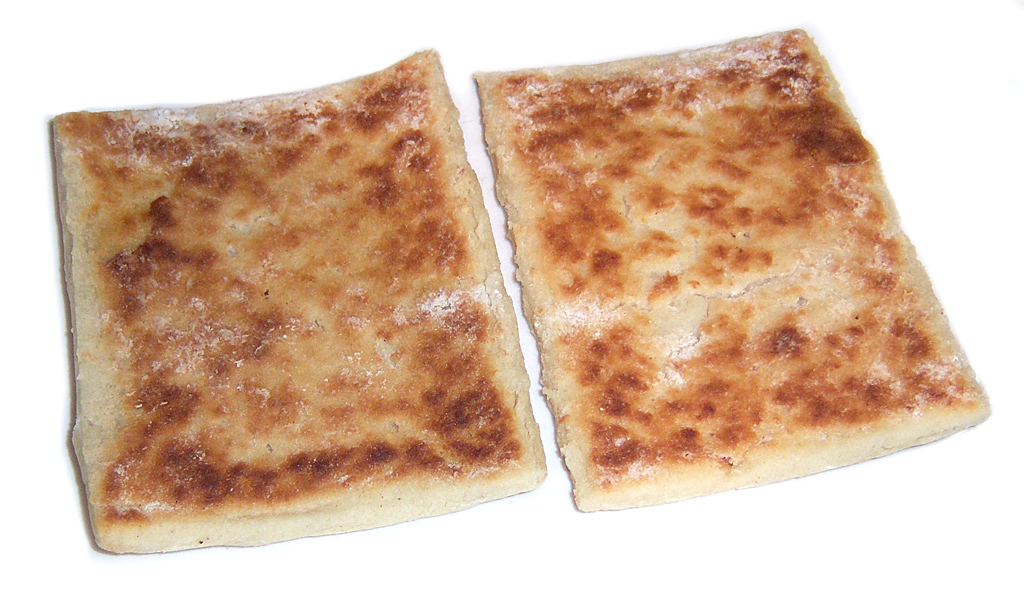
Northern Irish potato bread

Potato cakes, made from mashed potatoes and various other ingredients, such as flour, eggs, or baking soda, and cooked, are popular throughout the UK and Ireland and are commonly eaten at breakfast.

=== Irish potato bread ===
Irish potato bread, or potato scone, is typically made from mashed potato and either flour or baking soda and is usually fried. It is often served in traditional cooked breakfasts along with soda bread and toast.

=== Tattie scones ===
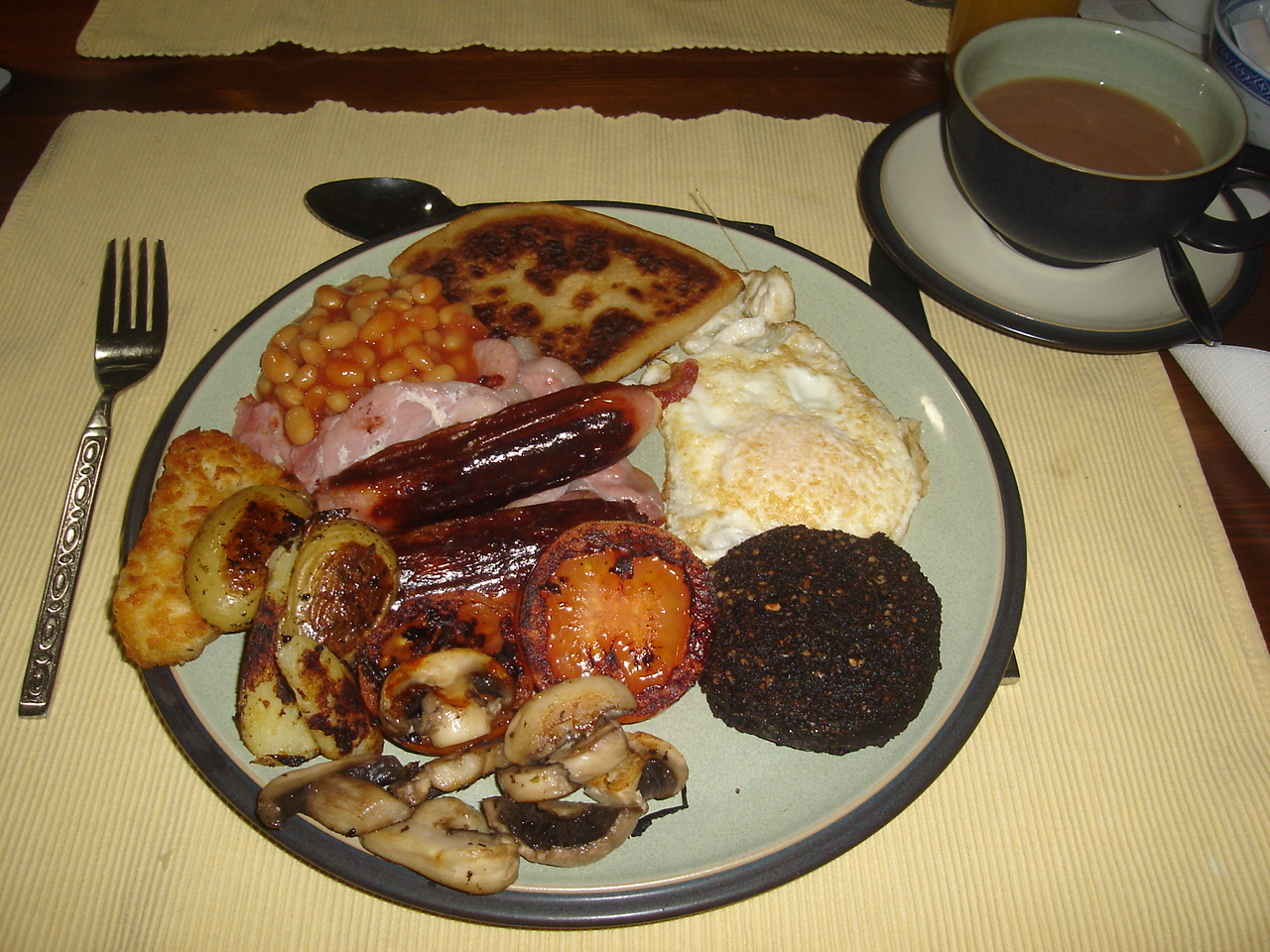
Scottish full breakfast with a tattie scone

Scottish tattie scones are made from mashed or reconstituted potato and flour and baked on a griddle. They are typically served fried with a full Scottish breakfast.

== Aloo paratha ==
Aloo paratha (lit. "potato paratha") is a bread dish from the Indian subcontinent. It is a breakfast dish originated from the Punjab region. The recipe is one of the most popular breakfast dishes throughout the western, central and northern regions of India as well as the eastern regions of Pakistan. Aloo parathas consist of unleavened dough rolled with a mixture of mashed potato and spices, which is cooked on a hot tawa with butter or ghee. Aloo paratha is usually served with butter, chutney, or Indian pickles, as the cuisine of various regions of northern and western India.

== See also ==
- Lefse
- List of potato dishes
- Potato pancake
- Tater tots
