= Zürcher Geschnetzeltes =

Swiss dish of veal in wine and cream sauce

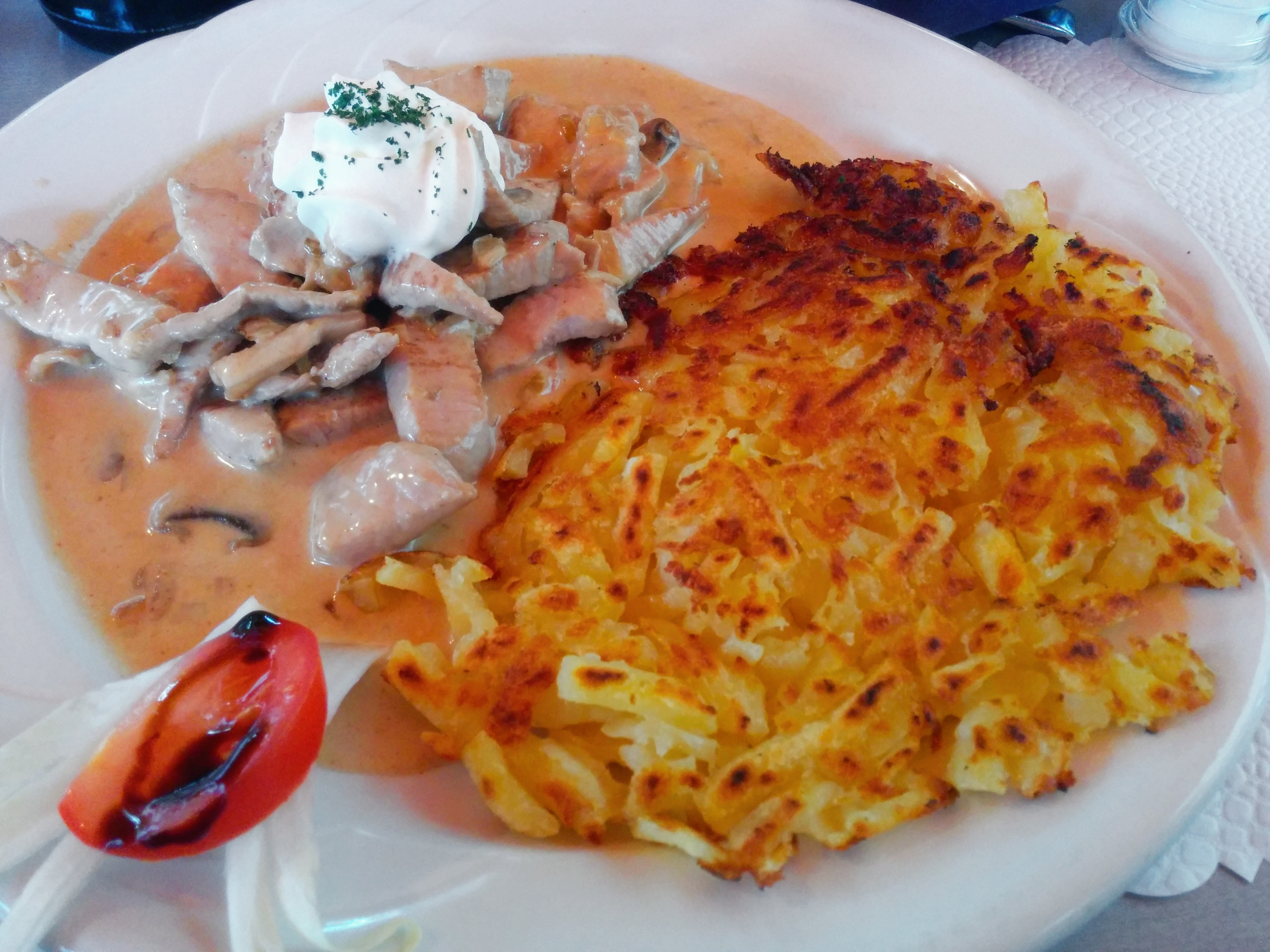
Zürcher Geschnetzeltes, with a side of rösti

Zürcher Geschnetzeltes (German for "sliced meat Zürich style", Züri-Gschnätzlets in Zürich German, émincé de veau à la zurichoise in French) is a Swiss dish from Zürich.

The first mention of Zürcher Geschnetzeltes is in a cookbook from 1947. That recipe describes the ingredients as sliced veal strips, white wine, cream, and demiglace. Some contemporary recipes may also call for mushrooms and sliced veal kidney.

== Method ==
The veal is cut into small thin strips, sautéed quickly in a very hot pan with a little butter and a bit of chopped onion, then taken out and kept warm. White wine is used to deglaze the pan, then cream and demiglace are added and reduced into a sauce. The meat is returned to the reduction, along with sliced mushrooms. Finally, the dish is seasoned with salt, pepper, and a squeeze of lemon juice. A dash of paprika is sometimes added as a garnish.

Zürcher Geschnetzeltes is typically served with Rösti, the traditional Swiss shredded potato cake. Alternatives include Spätzle, pasta, rice, or mashed potatoes.

== See also ==
- Beef Stroganov
- List of veal dishes
