= Potato pancake =

Shallow-fried pancakes of grated or ground potato

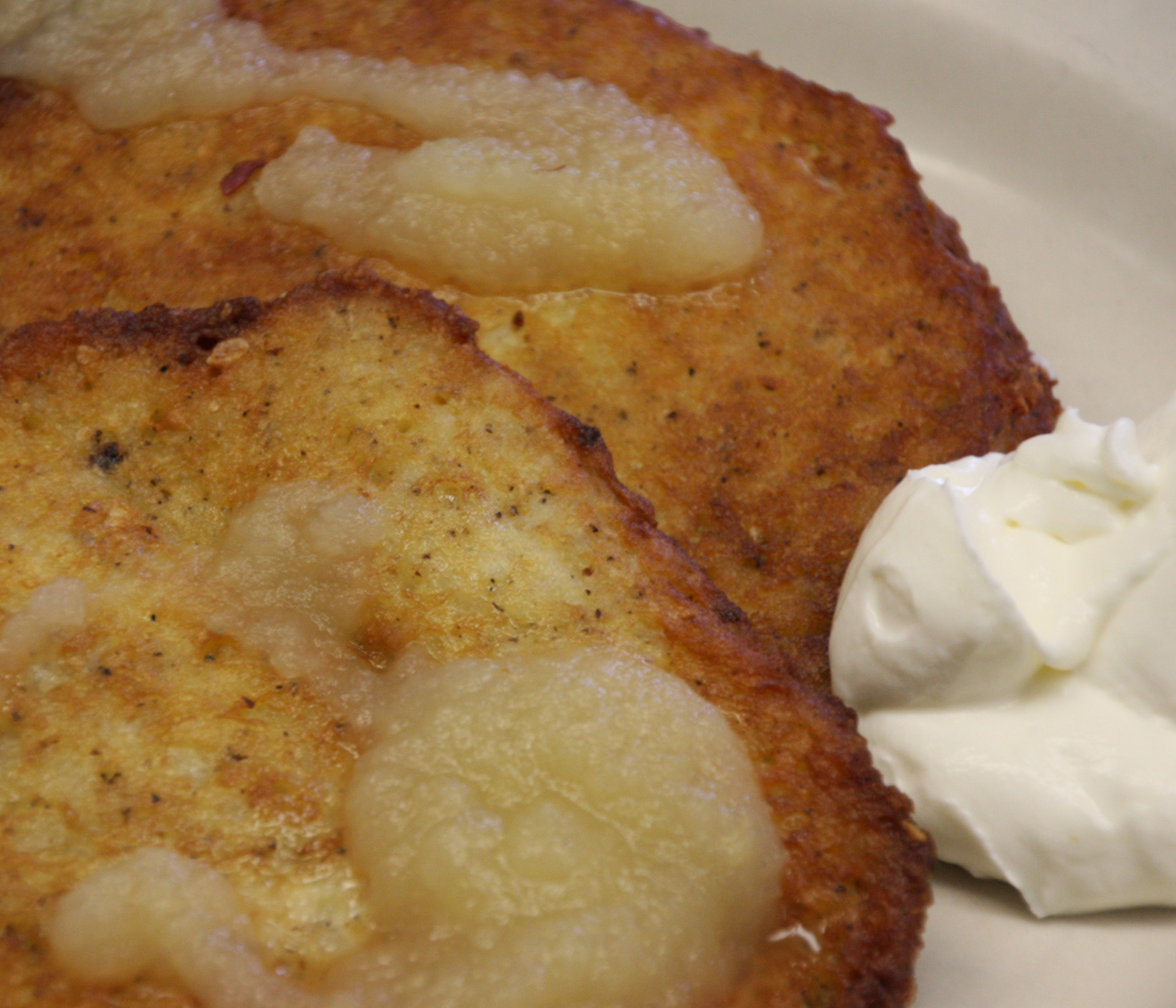
- Potato pancakes with apple sauce and sour cream
- Type: Pancake
- Region or state: Central, Eastern, and Northern Europe
- Main ingredients: Potatoes, flour, egg, cooking oil

Potato pancakes are shallow-fried pancakes consisting of grated or ground potato, matzo meal or flour and typically a binding ingredient such as egg or corn starch, often flavored with grated garlic or onion and seasonings. They may be topped with a variety of condiments, ranging from the savory (such as sour cream or cottage cheese), to the sweet (such as apple sauce or sugar), or they may be served plain. The dish is sometimes made from mashed potatoes to make pancake-shaped croquettes. Some variations are made with sweet potatoes.

== In different cultures ==
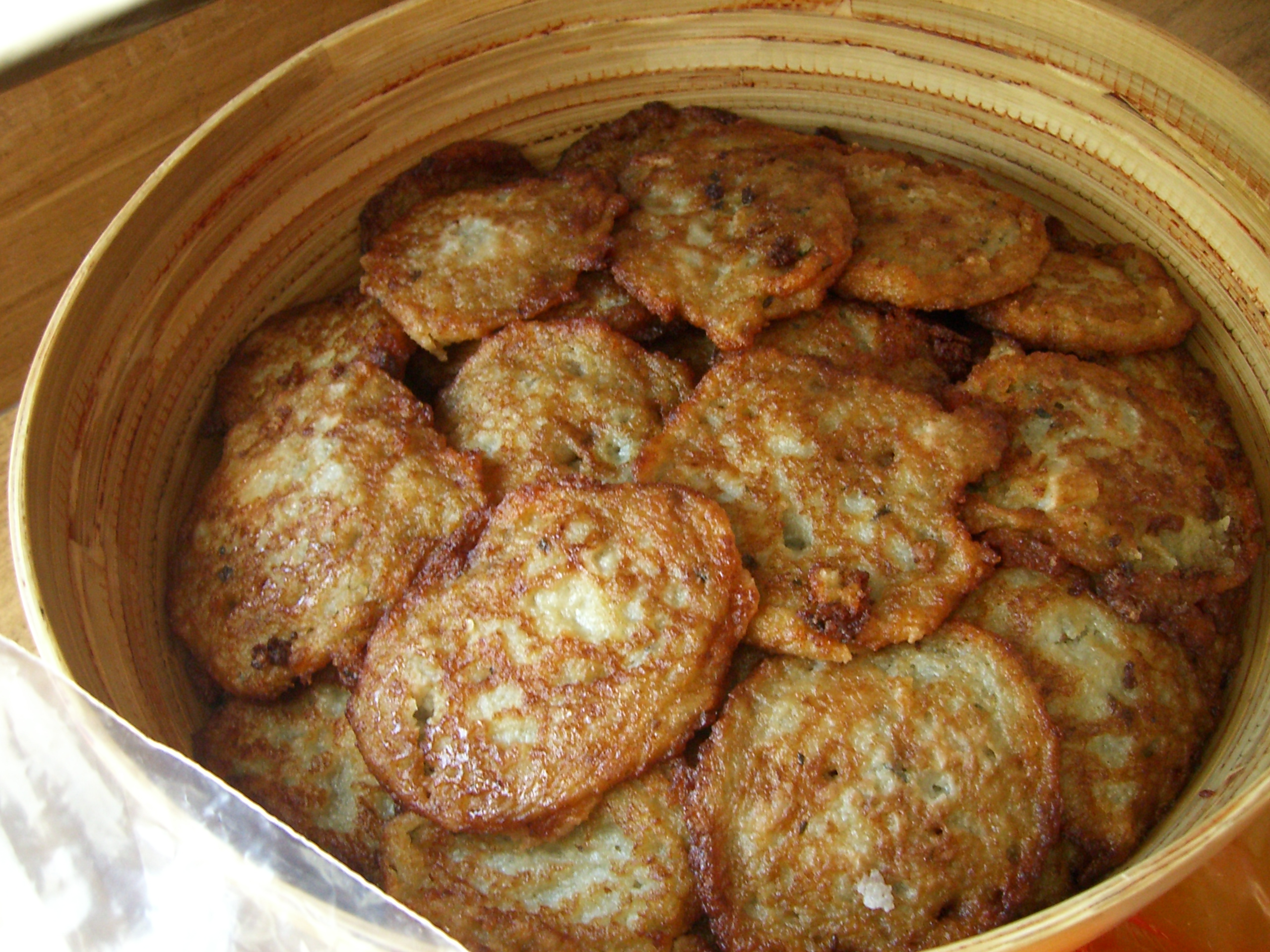
Belarusian draniki in a traditional crockery dish

Potato pancakes are associated with various European cuisines, including Irish (as boxty), German and Austrian (as Kartoffelpuffer, Reibekuchen, Reiberdatschi, Erdäpfelpuffer and Erdäpfellaibchen), Dutch (as aardappelpannenkoek, reifkoeken, reifjes), Belarusian (as дранікі draniki), Bulgarian (as patatnik), Czech (as bramborák, cmunda or vošouch), Hungarian (as tócsni, lapcsánka and other names), Jewish (as latka, Yiddish: לאַטקע, Hebrew: לביבה levivah, plural לביבות levivot), Latvian (as kartupeļu pankūkas), Lithuanian (as bulviniai blynai), Luxembourg (Gromperekichelcher), Polish (as placki ziemniaczane), Romanian (as tocini or tocinei), Russian (as драники draniki), Slovak (as zemiakové placky), Ukrainian (as деруни deruny), Italian (frittelle di patate) and any cuisine that has adopted similar dishes. In Spain they are called tortillitas de patatas; in Mexico in some areas they are called tortitas de papa or camaron, and are only prepared in some regions for Lent or meatless Fridays.

It is the national dish of Belarus, Ukraine, Russia and Slovakia. In Germany, potato pancakes are eaten either salty (as a side dish) or sweet with apple sauce, or blueberries, sugar and cinnamon; they are a very common menu item at outdoor markets and festivals in colder seasons. In Swiss cuisine, rösti is a variation that never contains egg or flour. American hash browns are also without eggs and flour. Potato pancakes are a traditional favorite in southern Indiana during holiday festivities. In Taranto, Italy, potato pancakes are called frittelle di patate alla tarantina and are made with potatoes, salt and Canestrato Pugliese.

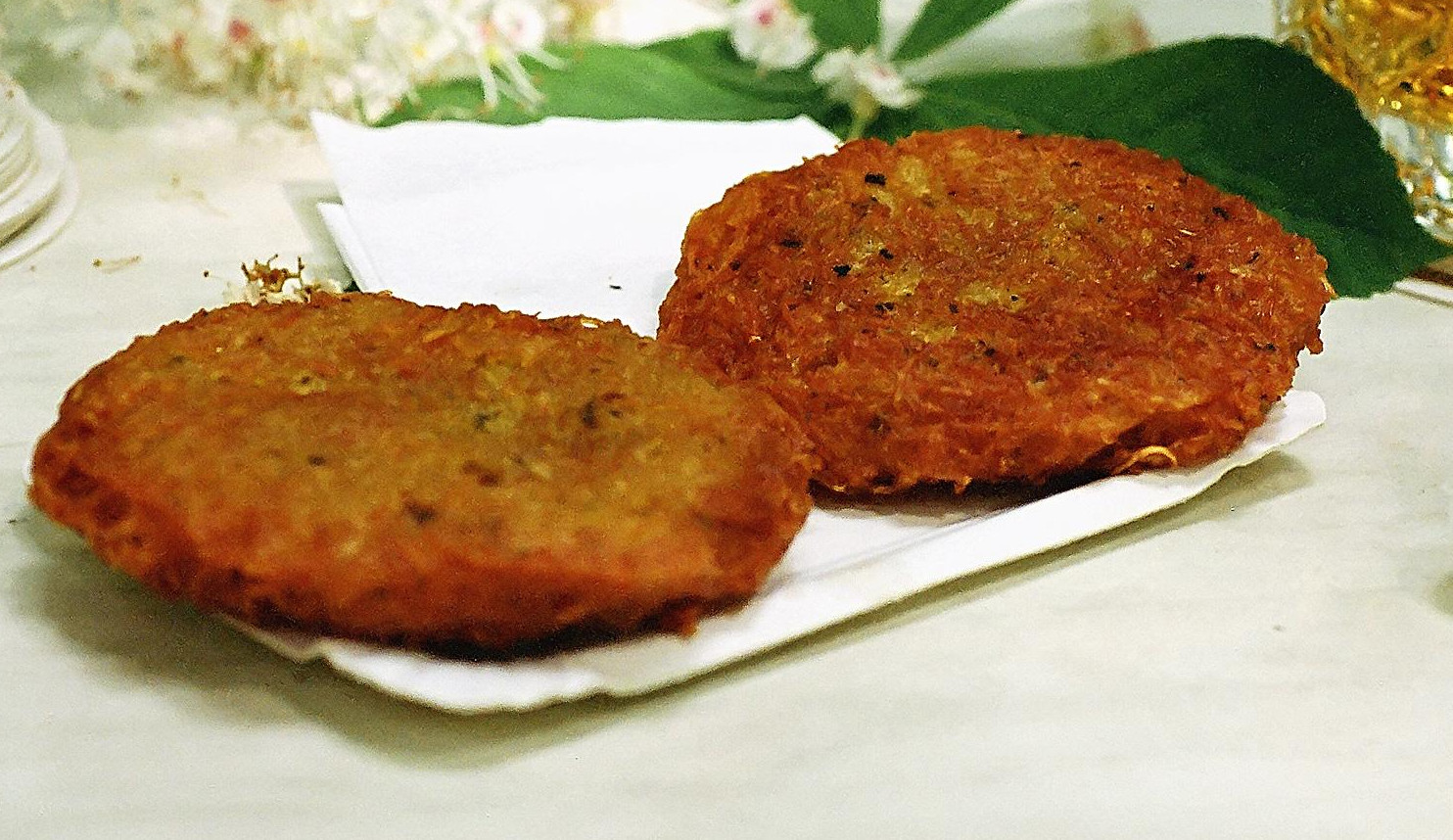
Potato pancakes from Austria

=== Swedish raggmunkar, potatisplättar, rårakor and potatisbullar ===
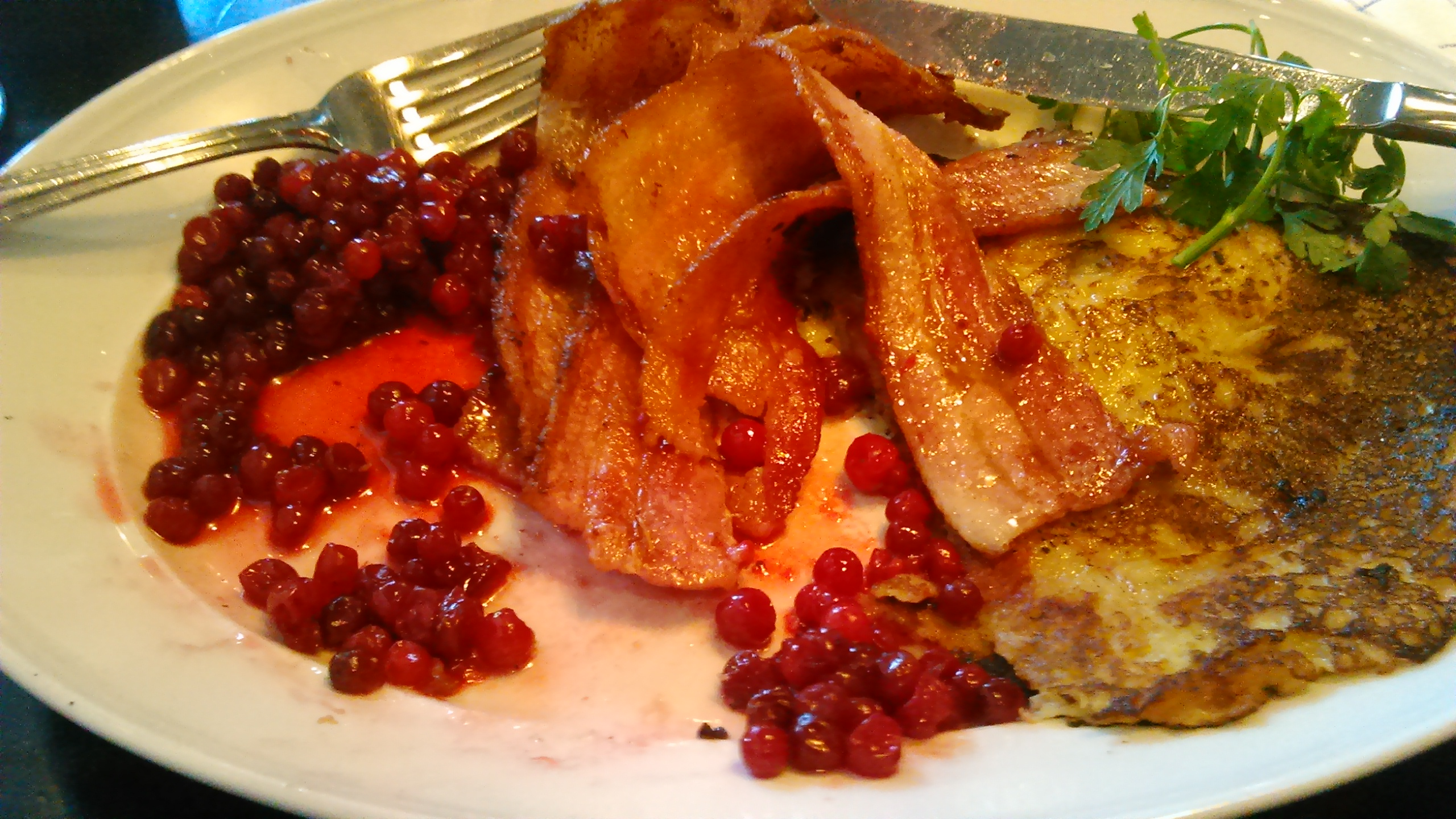
Raggmunk with pork and lingonberries

There are four Swedish versions of potato pancakes.

- Raggmunkar are prepared with a pancake batter of wheat flour, milk and egg, into which shredded raw potatoes are added. They are fried in butter and look like crêpes (i.e. thin pancakes).
- Potatisplättar are also made of pancake batter and shredded potatoes, but the potatoes are cooked before they are shredded.
- Rårakor are a variant more akin to hash browns and rösti, i.e. shredded raw potatoes formed as thin pancakes, but without any batter, which are fried in butter. They can be served as a fancy starter with sour cream, red onion and Kalix Löjrom.
- Potatisbullar are rather thick pancake-like patties of mashed potatoes and eggs, which are turned in breadcrumbs and then fried in butter. Can be bought ready-made in Sweden.

All four variants are traditionally served with fried bacon and lingonberry jam.

=== Slavic draniki ===
Draniki are found in many Slavic countries, particularly Belarus, Ukraine, Russia, and Slovakia. Draniki are the national dish of said countries. They are popular in Belarus specifically.

Draniki are traditionally eaten with sour cream.

=== British potato cakes ===
Potato cakes are common in the United Kingdom. In the North-East of England (particularly County Durham), there is a dish known as "tattie fish" because the pancake resembles a deep-fried piece of fish. The pancake consists of flour, eggs, shredded potatoes and onions. Some people add tomato or cheese to the mix.

The British also brought potato pancakes to former colonies such as Zimbabwe, where they are an affordable dish still eaten today.

=== Irish boxty ===
A form of potato pancake known as boxty (Irish: bacstaí) is a popular traditional dish in most of Ireland, particularly north Connacht and southern Ulster. It is made similarly to the British type, with more starch and often with buttermilk and baking soda. It has a smooth, grained consistency.

=== Jewish latke ===
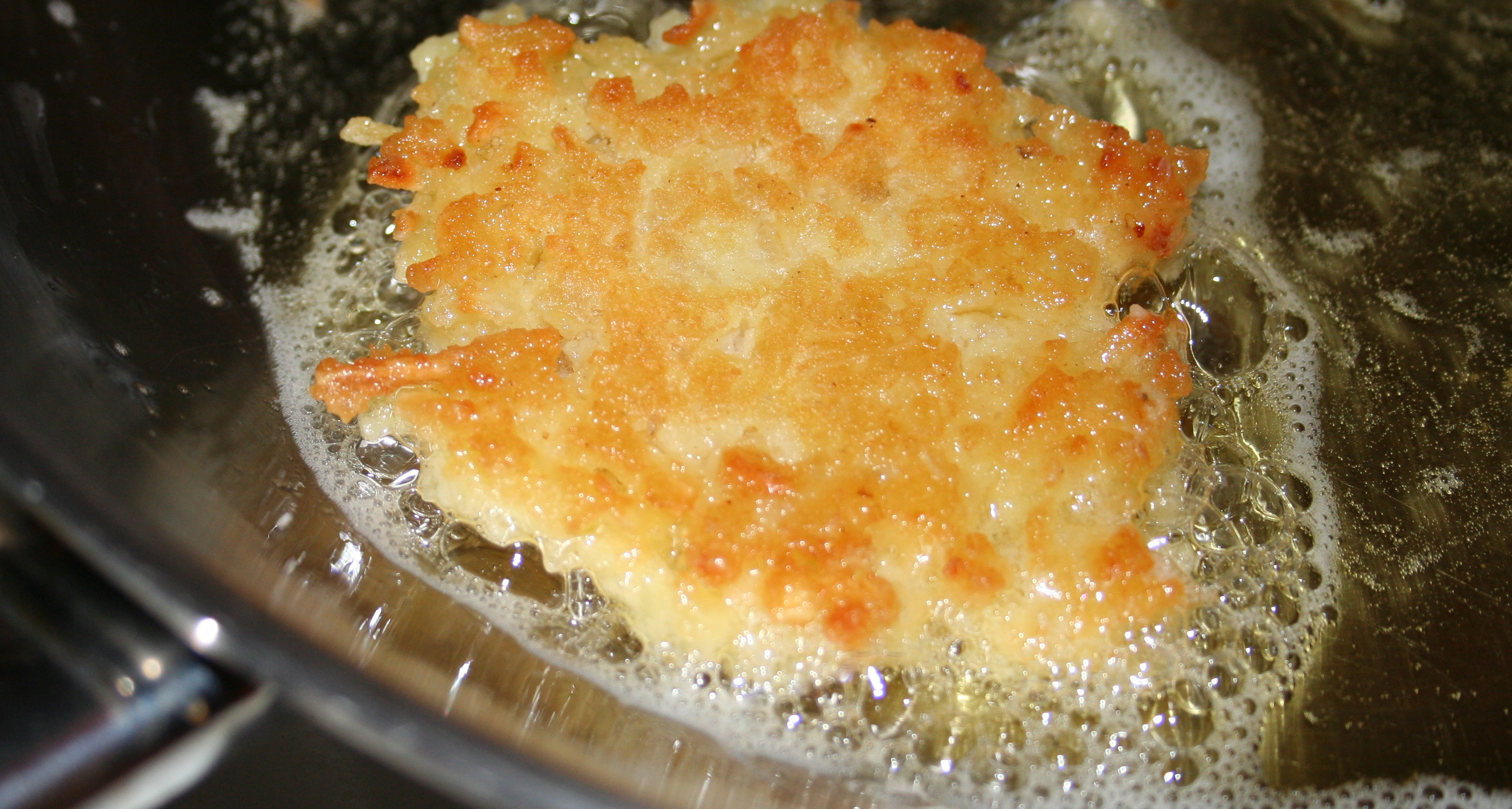
Latka frying in oil

Latkes (לאַטקע, sometimes spelled latka) are potato pancakes that Ashkenazi Jews have prepared as part of the Hanukkah festival since the mid-1800s, when a series of crop failures in Poland and Ukraine led to mass planting of potatoes, which were easy and cheap to grow. The potato dish is based on an older variant made with cheese instead of potatoes that goes back to at least the Middle Ages.

Latkes need not necessarily be made from potatoes, and usage of word itself predates the introduction of the potato from the Americas to the Old World. Historically, "latke" referred to pancakes made from a variety of vegetables, cheeses, legumes, or starches as determined by the ingredients that would have been available in a given place and time. Although the potato variety is presently the most popular and widely-known, non-potato recipes persist in some communities. Numerous modern recipes call for the addition of ingredients such as onions and carrots. Daily variations on a simple potato latka might include zucchini, sweet onion and gruyere (for French onion flavor) and some variations made with sweet potatoes.

The word latke itself is derived (via Yiddish) from the East Slavic word ladka, oladka, a diminutive from oladya (оладья), "small pancake". The word levivah (לביבה), the Hebrew name for latke, refers in the Book of Samuel to a dumpling made from kneaded dough, as part of the story of Amnon and Tamar. Some interpreters have noted that the homonym levav (לבב) means "heart", and the verbal form of l-v-v occurs in the Song of Songs as well. In the lexicon of Ashkenazi Jews from Udmurtia and Tatarstan there are recorded versions of the kosher-style appellation of latkes (draniki, dranki, krezliki, kremzliki, kakorki, etc.) during the eight-day Hanukkah holiday.

=== Korean gamja-jeon ===
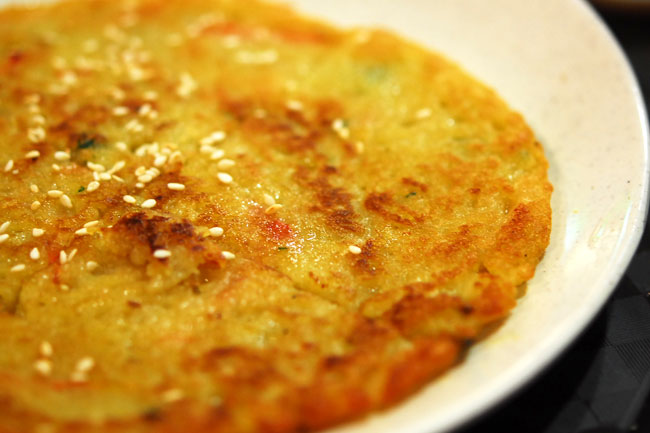
Gamja-jeon

Gamja-jeon (감자전; lit. '"potato pancake"') is a Korean pancake made by pan-frying in oil the mixture of grated potato and potato starch. It can be made without additional ingredients, but is sometimes mixed with onion, chilli and perilla leaf. Generally, it is seasoned with a small amount of salt and served with soy sauce.

=== Moroccan maaquda ===
A popular street food in Morocco is the maaquda, prepared very similar to latkes. It probably originated in the colonial era, when potatoes were introduced to Morocco.

=== Polish placki ziemniaczane ===
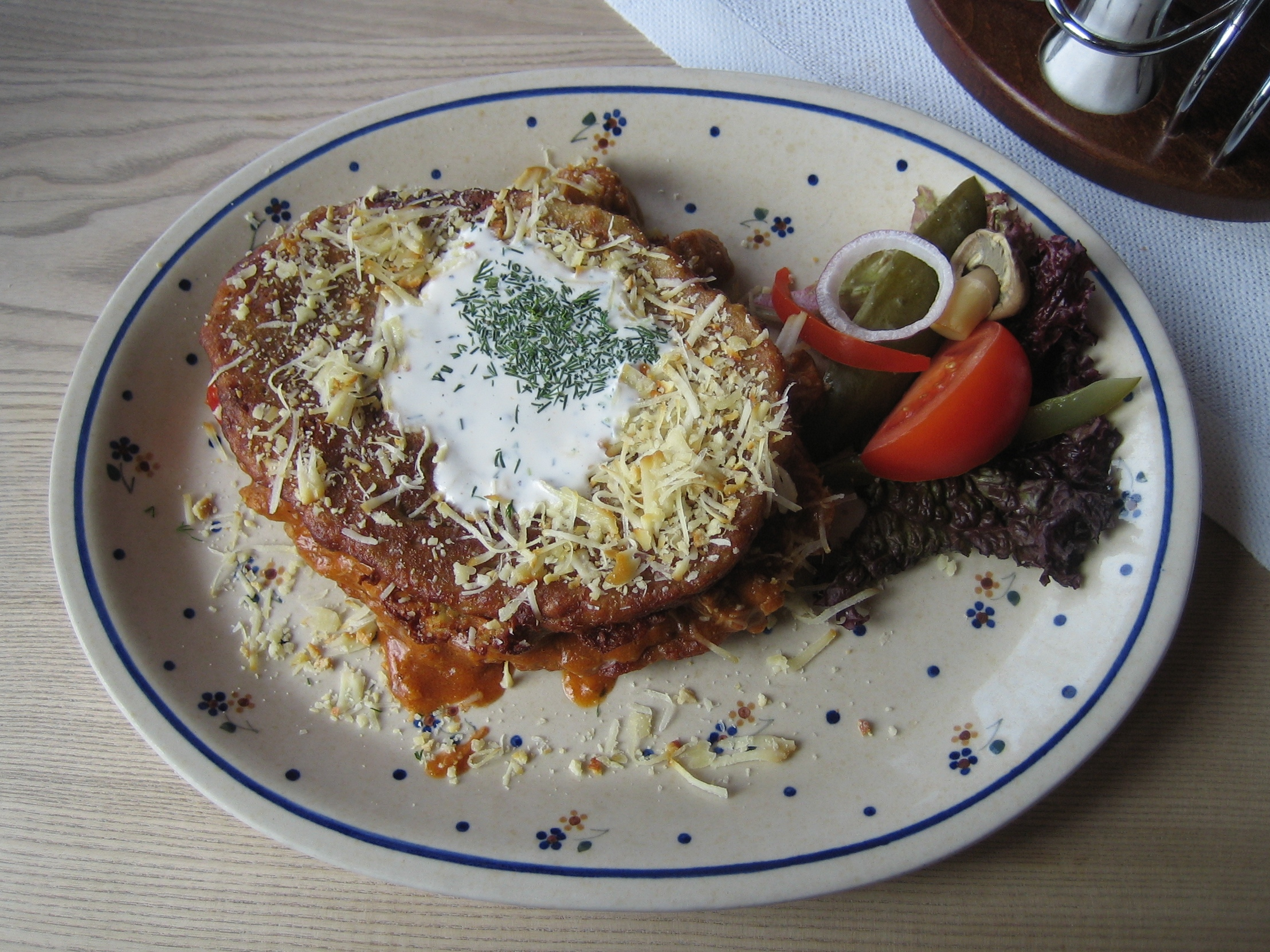
A potato placek with spicy goulash (Placek ziemniaczany z gulaszem na ostro) served with bundz (sheep's milk cheese) and sour cream (perhaps mixed with yogurt) in a restaurant in Zakopane, Poland

Potato pancakes, literally translated in Polish as placki ziemniaczane, are often served in Poland topped with meat sauce, pork crisps or goulash, as well as sour cream, apple sauce, mushroom sauce, and cottage or sheep's cheese or even fruit syrup. Placki ziemniaczane was a staple food in 17th-century Polish monasteries according to a written recipe from Stoczek Warmiński with one onion, two eggs and a spoonful of wheat flour per each kilogram of potatoes, served only with salt and pepper. In the 19th century, especially in times of economic difficulty during the foreign partitions, potato pancakes often replaced missing bread among the peasants. The lower-quality crops given to field laborers were sometimes turned by them quickly into pancakes to improve taste and prolong freshness. Also, their popularity is closely associated with the historic presence of one of the largest Jewish communities in the world flourishing in Poland.

The largest potato pancake (possibly in the world), measuring 2 meters and 2 centimeters, was made during the annual two-day celebrations of Święto Plinzy (Plinza festival) in Rzechta, Poland. The tongue-in-cheek games in Rzechta include the throwing of bad potato pancake, with the record of 29 meters.

==== Brigand's pancake ====
A derived dish consists of thick goulash laid on a potato pancake. It has origins in or near the Tatra Mountains, on either the Polish or the Slovak side. The dish bears a variety of names:

- placek zbójnicki (brigand's) — most common
- placek cygański (gypsy's)
- placek węgierski (Hungarian) — despite being unknown in Hungary; but goulash (the topping) itself comes from Hungary
- jadło drwali (lumberjacks' food)
- placek góralski (Highlander's)

=== Czech bramborák ===
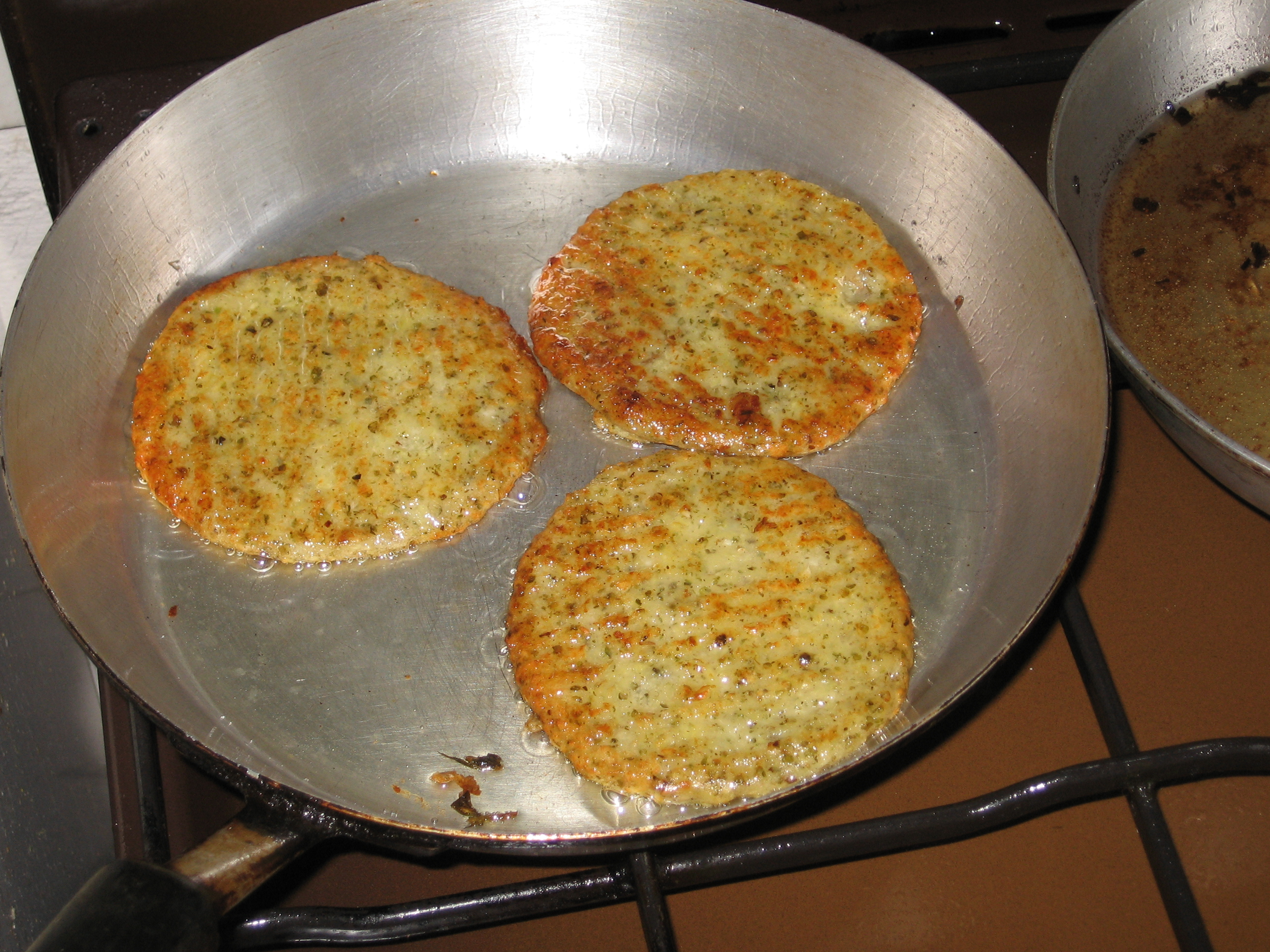
Bramborák

A Czech potato pancake is called bramborák (from brambor, potato) and it is made of grated potatoes with egg, breadcrumbs or flour and seasoning (salt, pepper, most importantly garlic and marjoram; sometimes ground, cracked or whole caraway seeds) and is served as it is. Some regional versions blend in dough, sauerkraut or sliced smoked meat. The same potato dough is used also as the coating of fried pork chops called kaplický řízek. It is sometimes deep-fried.

=== Iranian kuku sib zamini ===
In Iranian cuisine, kuku sib-zamini (Gilaki: کوکو سیب زمینی, 'potato kuku') is made with shredded potatoes, eggs, onion, saffron, sometimes garlic chives and sometimes cinnamon. Frequently, potato kuku is cooked as smaller patties, but it is also cooked in a larger pancake-style or baked. This dish has been compared to the latke, rösti and tortilla Española (Spanish omelette).

=== Ukrainian deruny ===
Deruny with mushroom sauce

Deruny (Ukrainian: деруни), also called tertiukhy, kremzlyky, or rysylovanyky in different regions, are traditional Ukrainian potato pancakes made from grated raw potatoes, onion (optional), flour (optional), and egg, typically shallow-fried in oil. The name deruny derives from the Ukrainian verb derty (Ukrainian: дерти) ("to grate"), reflecting the preparation method.

Deruny are common throughout Ukraine, especially in the northern and eastern regions. They are traditionally served with sour cream and sometimes accompanied by mushrooms, onions, or other vegetables. Regional variations may include cabbage, cheese, or herbs, depending on local or family recipes.

Since 2008, the town of Korosten in northern Ukraine has hosted the annual International Deruny Festival, featuring cooking competitions, tastings, and demonstrations of traditional preparation methods.

== See also ==
- Hash browns – Fried potato dish
- Korosten – City in Zhytomyr Oblast, Ukraine, a town in Ukraine that hosts an annual potato pancake festival
- Latke–Hamantash Debate – Annual debate at the University of Chicago
- Potato waffle – Mashed potato in grill shape
- Mücver – Turkish fritter or pancake, made from grated zucchini
- Tater tots - grated potato formed into small cylinders and deep-fried
