= Hash browns =

Fried potato dish

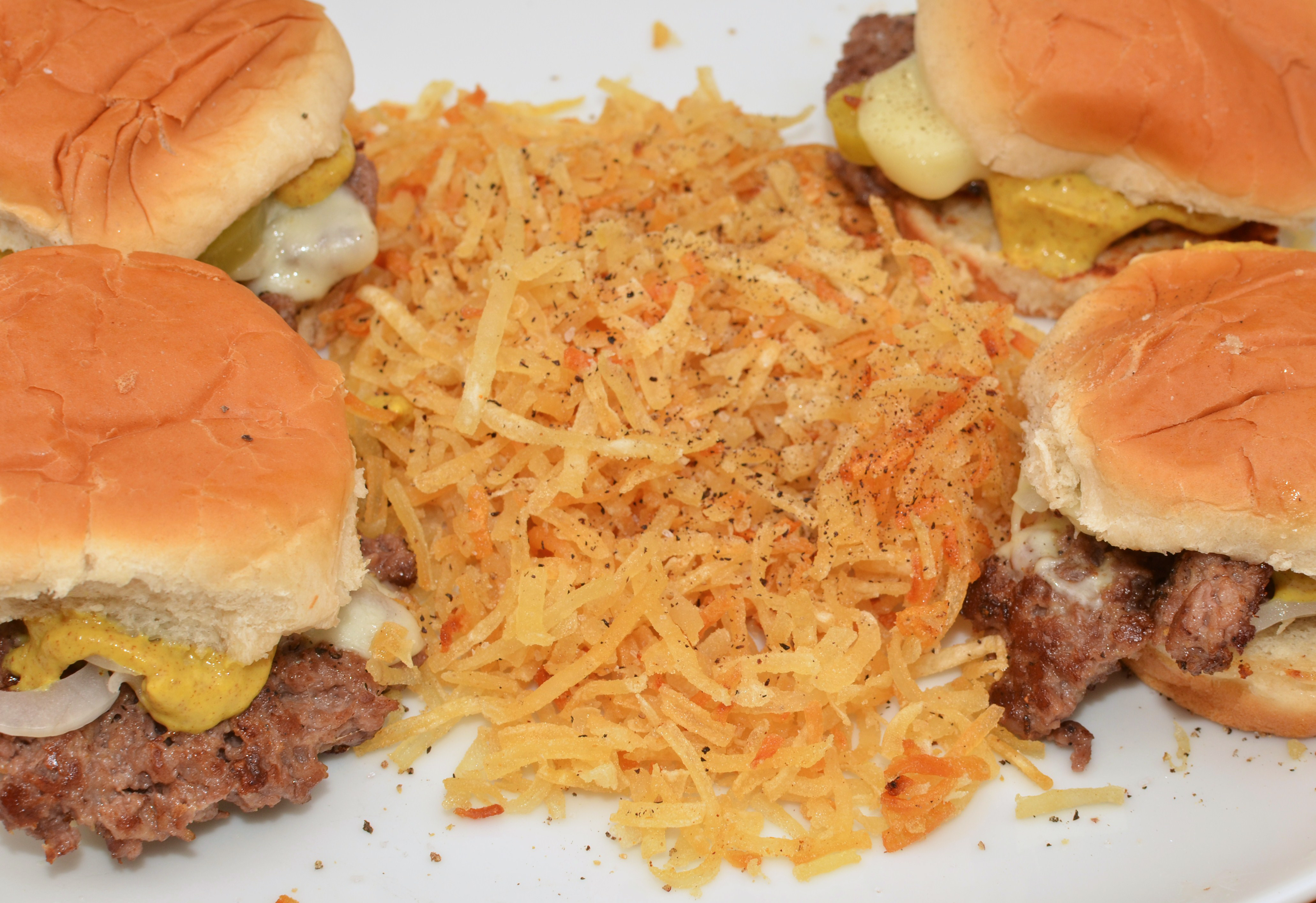
- Shredded hash browns, pictured with slider sandwiches
- Alternative names: Hashed brown potatoes
- Course: Side dish
- Place of origin: United States
- Main ingredients: Potato

Hash browns, also spelled hashed browns and hashbrowns, are a popular American breakfast food consisting of finely julienned potatoes that have been fried until golden brown. Hash browns are a staple breakfast item at diners in North America, where they are often fried on a large, common cooktop or grill.

Hash browns are a popular mass-produced product sold in refrigerated, frozen and dehydrated forms.

== Etymology ==
The word hash is derived from the French word hacher, which means 'to hack' or 'to chop'. In other words, hashed brown potatoes can be interpreted literally as "chopped and fried potatoes".

== History ==
The following recipe for "brown hashed potatoes" appears in the 1835 edition of the Minnesota Farmers' Institute Annual:

Chop cold boiled potatoes and season with salt and pepper. Put some clarified butter into the frying pan. Add the potatoes, cover and cook slowly until the potatoes are nicely browned on the underside. Fold and turn out on a warm platter.

Hash browns first started appearing on breakfast menus in New York City in the 1890s. The name was gradually changed to "hash-brown potatoes".

== Preparation ==
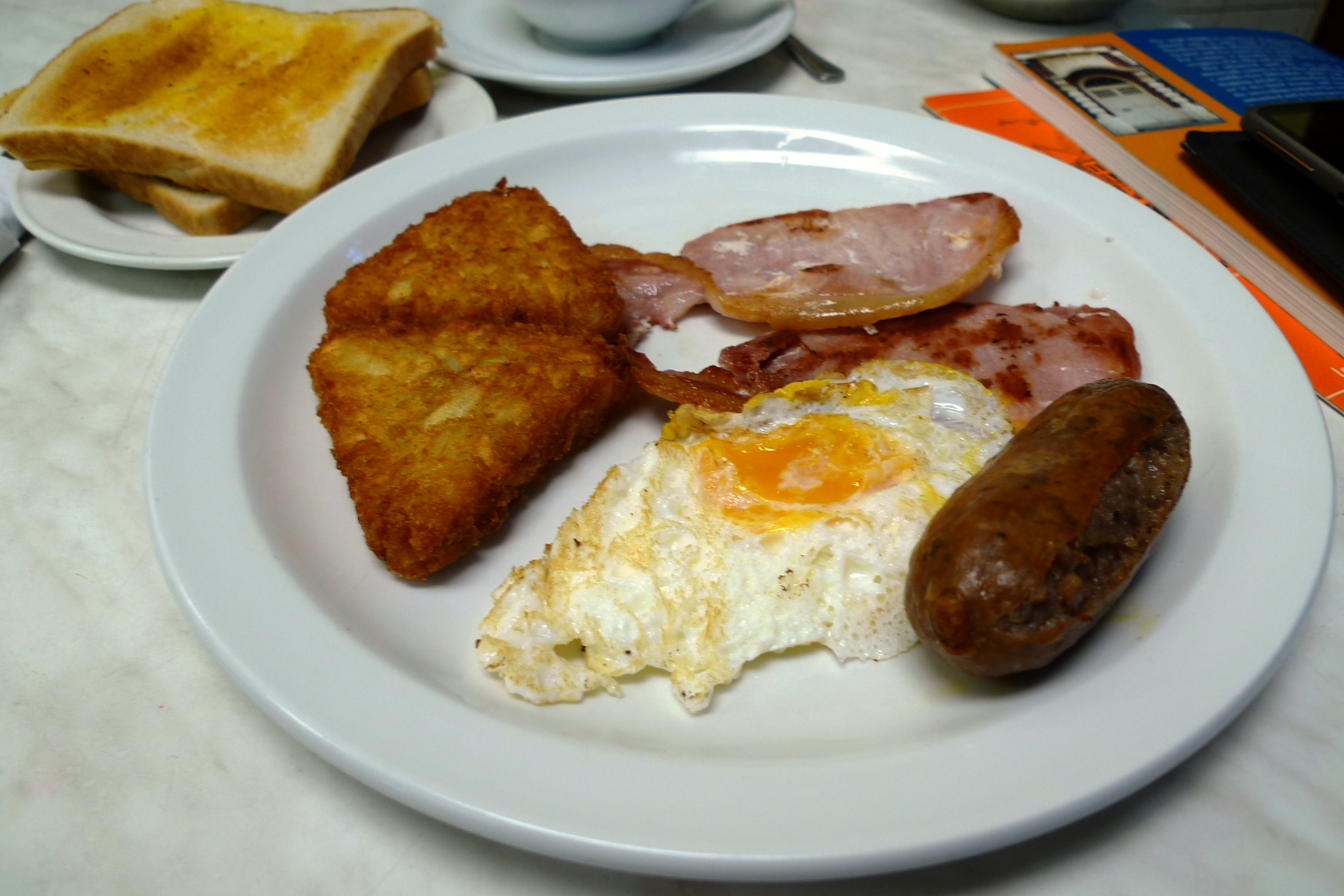
Hash browns are often served as part of an English breakfast.

A chef may prepare hash browns by either grating potato or forming riced potatoes into patties before frying with onions (moisture and potato starch can hold them together); however, if a binding agent is added (egg or flour for example), such a preparation constitutes a potato pancake.

Hash browns are sometimes made into patty form and frozen for ease of handling, and the compact, flat shape can also be cooked in a toaster oven or toaster. For best results, in both cooking and flavor, it is recommended that hash browns be made using starchy potatoes such as russet potatoes. If a dish of hash browned potatoes incorporates chopped meat, leftovers, or other vegetables, it is commonly referred to as hash.

Hash browns are also manufactured as a dehydrated food, which is sometimes used by backpackers.

In Britain, hash browns almost always refers to individual formed and deep-fried 'cakes' of grated potato, typically triangular. These are commonly available with a full breakfast, though this is sometimes controversial amongst traditionalists.

In the United States, hash browns may refer to shredded, pan-fried potatoes or diced/cubed potatoes, the latter also being known as country fried potatoes or home fries. Some recipes add diced or chopped onions, and when bell peppers are added to cubed home fries the dish is known as Potatoes O'Brien.

== See also ==
- Potato pancake
- Hash
- Boxty
- Bubble and squeak
- Croquette
- Perkedel
- Fried potatoes
- Home fries
- Potato waffle
- Rösti
- Tater tots
- Funeral potatoes
- Latkes
- Aloo tikki
