= Potatoes O'Brien =

Pan-fried potatoes

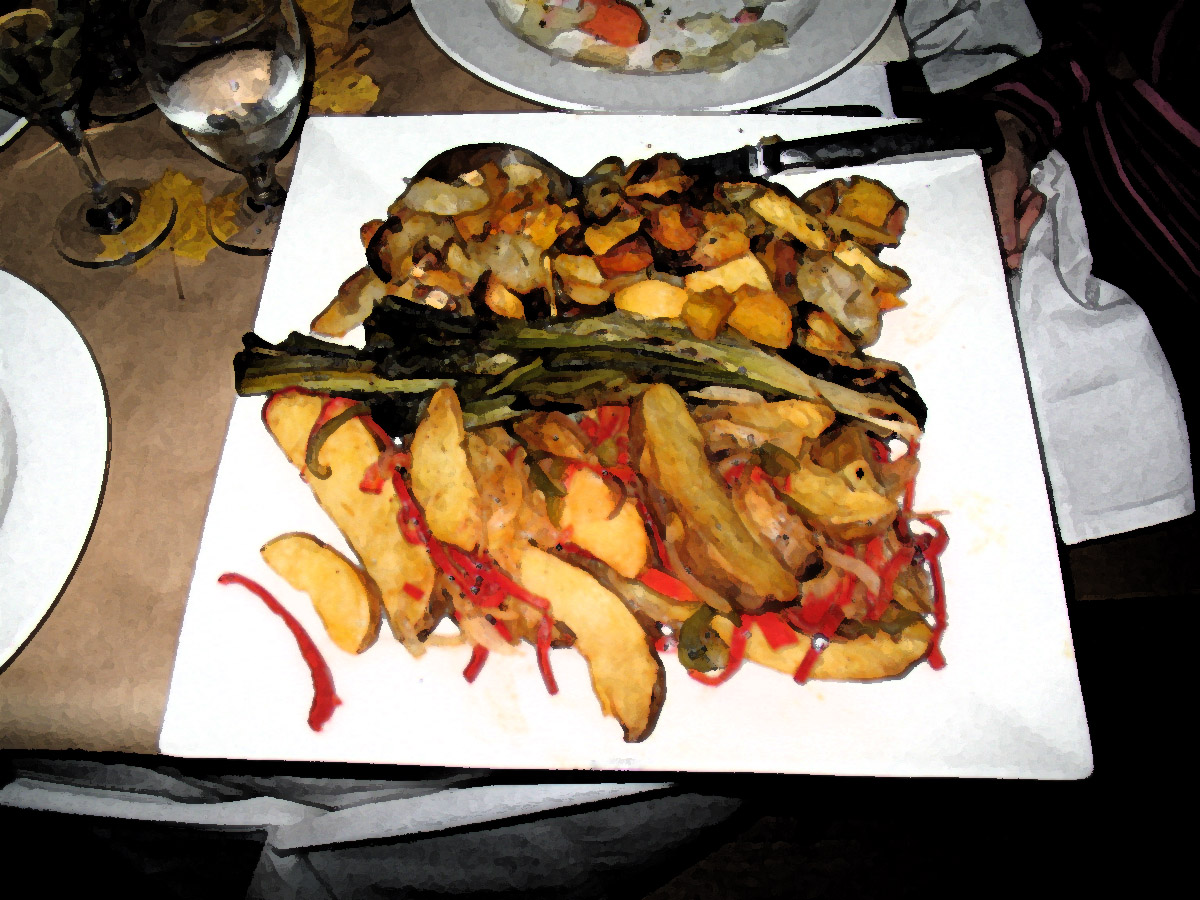
- Potatoes O'Brien (at bottom of plate)
- Place of origin: United States
- Serving temperature: Hot
- Main ingredients: Potatoes, green and red bell peppers, onion

Potatoes O'Brien is a dish of pan-fried potatoes along with red and green bell peppers and onion, served hot. The origin of the dish is disputed; it has been claimed to have originated in the early 1900s at Jerome's, a restaurant in Boston, or at Jack's, a restaurant in Manhattan, during the same period.

== Variations ==
A variation of potatoes O'Brien includes bacon in the dish.

Potatoes O'Brien can be seasoned many different ways, typically with black pepper, paprika, salt and garlic powder.

== See also ==
- Batata harra, pan-fried potatoes with peppers and garlic from Levantine cuisine
- Hash browns, the shredded potato dish
- Home fries, the simple chunked potato preparation
- Lyonnaise potatoes, pan-fried potatoes from French cuisine
- Pyttipanna, chopped potatoes mixed with meat and onions from the Nordic countries
- List of brunch foods
- List of potato dishes
