= Potato waffle =

Mashed potato in grill shape

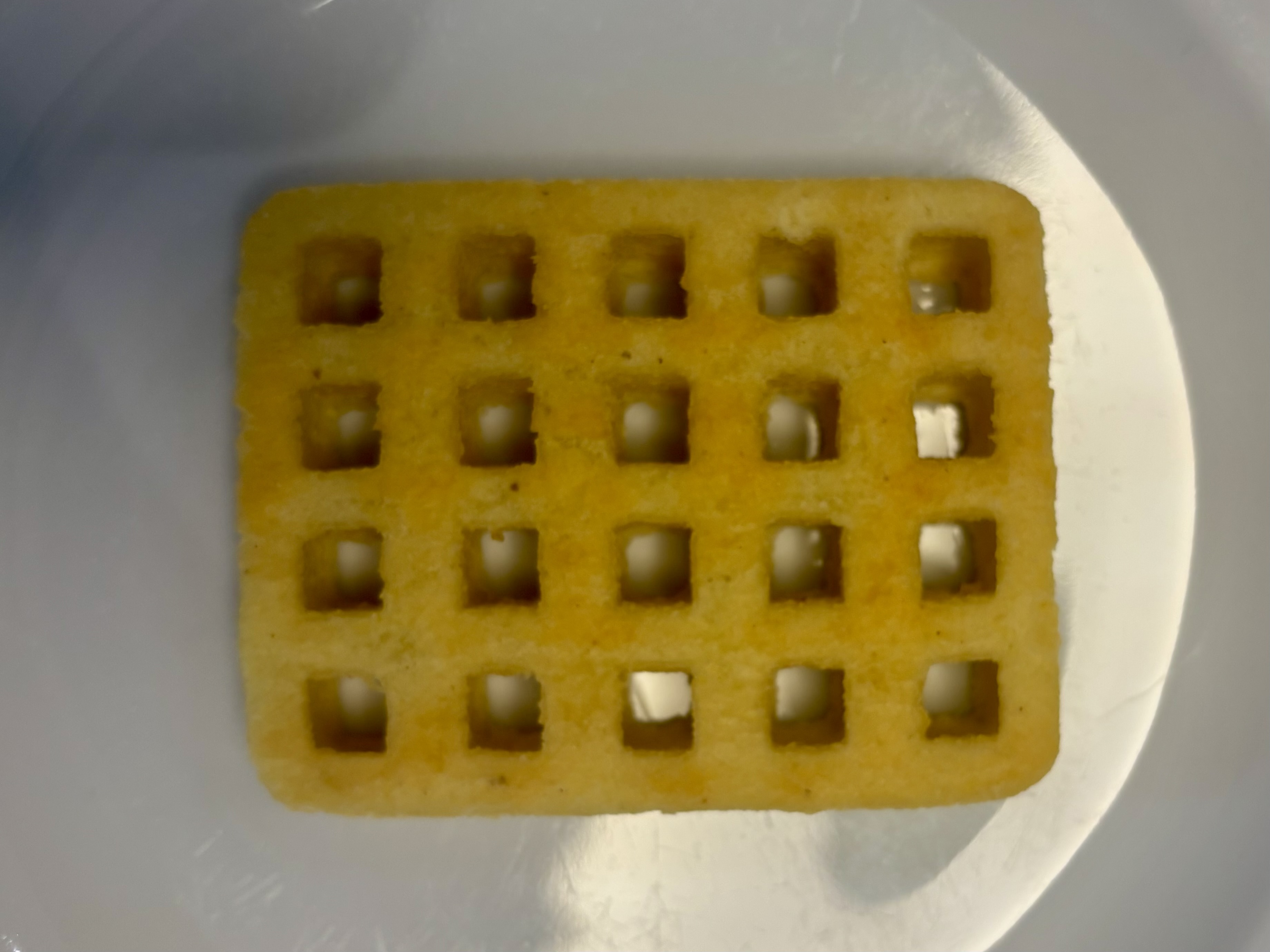
- Type: Savoury, potato-based
- Main ingredients: Potatoes, vegetable oil, seasonings

Potato waffles are a potato-based savoury food formed into a grid pattern resembling a waffle. They are common in the United Kingdom and Ireland and are also available in other countries.

From the mid-1970s to the early 1980s, frozen foods became increasingly popular in the United Kingdom. This growth has been linked to the increasing availability of domestic freezers and demand for convenient meal options. During this period, products such as Findus Crispy Pancakes and Birds Eye potato waffles were introduced and began being served in British households. Birds Eye began producing potato waffles in 1981. The product was accompanied by a jingle featuring the phrase "waffly versatile", which was used in advertising.

Potato waffles are made from potatoes combined with vegetable oil and seasonings. Commercial varieties often include additional ingredients such as potato granules, potato starch, and stabilisers. Recipes and formulations vary between manufacturers, with some products including ingredients such as rice flour, dextrose, and additional stabilisers. As a result, potato waffles are generally considered a processed food product.

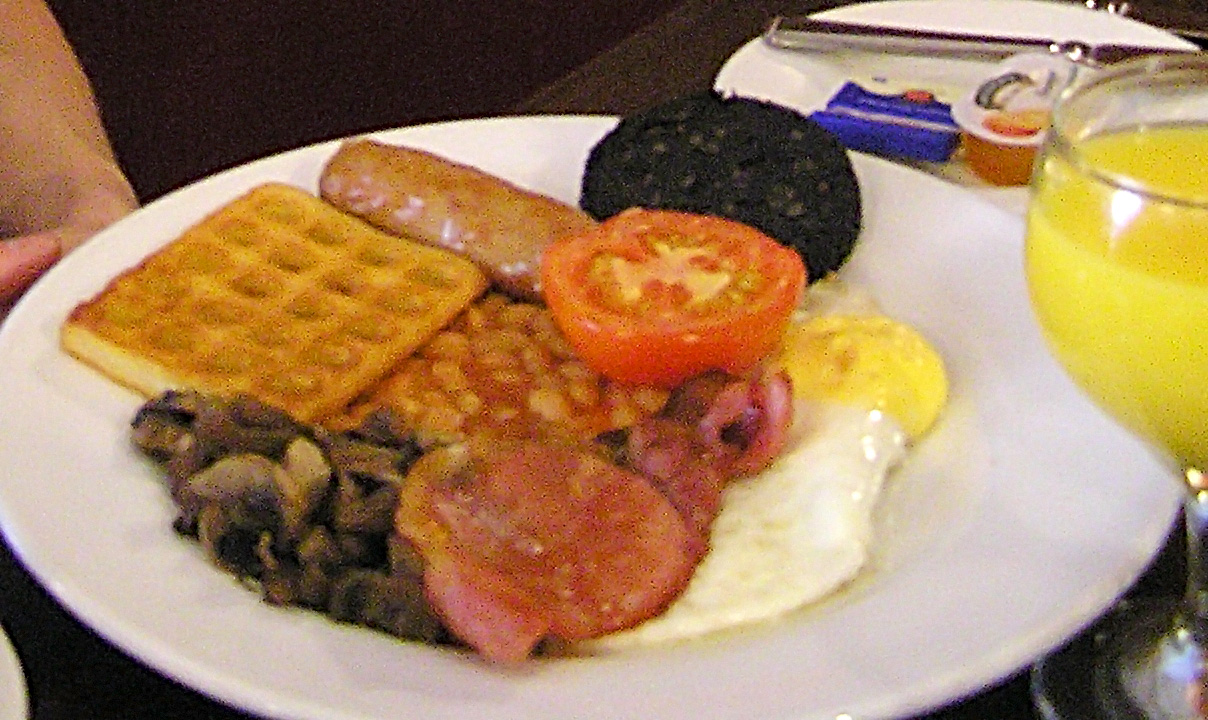
Potato waffle, as part of a full breakfast

Potato waffles are typically cooked from frozen by baking in an oven or under a grill, and may also be prepared using a toaster. They may be served with other foods, for example with bacon and eggs.

== See also ==
- List of potato dishes
- Waffle fries
