= Man v. Food season 3 =

Man v. Food
- Season 3
- No. of episodes: 20

Release
- Original network: Travel Channel
- Original release: June 16 – October 20, 2010

Season chronology
- ← Previous; Season 2 Next → Nation

The third season of the food reality television series, Man v. Food, premiered on the Travel Channel June 16, 2010, at 9 pm Eastern Time. On Man v. Food, the host, actor and food enthusiast Adam Richman, visits a different city to sample the "big food" of its local eateries before taking on a pre-existing eating challenge at one of the local restaurants.

The final third-season tally wound up at 12 wins for Man and 9 wins for Food (despite technically finishing his challenge in Indianapolis, Adam called it a victory for Food).

== Episodes ==
Episode	Episode Number	Original Air Date	Winner
San Diego, CA	1 (39)	June 16, 2010	Man
Adam traveled to San Diego to kick off the show's third season. First, he visited the Lucha Libre Gourmet Taco Shop which gets its name and floor to ceiling decor from Mexico's high flying version of professional wrestling. Adam tried the Surfin' California Burrito, which is filled with carne asada, grilled shrimp, pico de gallo, shredded Jack cheese, sliced avocados, chipotle sauce, and fries. The shrimp and lime juice basted carne asada are cooked on the grill and the fries deep fried. The meats and fries are piled on a tortilla and the pico de gallo, cheese, avacado and chipotle sauce are put on top. Adam enjoyed his burrito in the restaurant's "Champion's Booth", a golden booth that usually needs to be reserved at least a day in advance. At Phil's BBQ, the second stop, the meat is cooked over mesquite wood. Adam tried a sandwich called the "El Toro", which featured grilled tri-tip beef glazed with Phil's homemade barbecue sauce and stuffed in a large Kaiser roll. The sauce is a hybrid of sorts of the thickness of Kansas City BBQ and the tanginess of Carolina BBQ. The sauce caramelizes with the meat on the grill when it is ladled on. This episode's challenge was at the Broken Yolk Cafe, a breakfast spot opened in 1979 that offers over 30 varieties of omelets. Adam took on the Broken Yolk Iron Man Challenge, a 12-egg, six pound omelet filled with sautéed onions, mushrooms, and half a pound of shredded American cheese, and topped with chili and more shredded cheese. The omelet is also served with 1 1/2 pounds (680 g) of hashbrowns and two large buttermilk biscuits. To win, Adam needed to finish the meal in under an hour. To psyche himself up for the challenge, Adam fantasized himself as a masked luchador competing against another pair of masked luchadors (representing an "egg and bacon breakfast"). In the challenge (which only 400 out of about 10,000 challengers have completed up to this point), Adam finished more than half the meal before it got cold, making it harder to consume. Adam helped himself by adding guacamole to the meal and the plan ultimately worked in his favor as he finished the challenge in 32 minutes. For winning, Adam received the meal for free as well as a commemorative T-shirt and a spot on the café's Wall of Fame (complete with a commemorative plaque).
Boulder, CO	2 (40)	June 16, 2010	Food
Adam visited Boulder, Colorado, home of the University of Colorado, for their unique food creations. His first stop was Beau Jo's, known for their famed "Mountain Pies" (large pizzas with a massive ridge of hand rolled crust filled with several different ingredients and smothered with melted mozzarella cheese). Locals are also known for putting honey on the crust. There, he tried the largest Mountain Pie, called the "Grand Sicilian", which weighed an astonishing 14 pounds (6.4 kg). Seven pounds of dough are rolled and the crust braided to form the high ridge crust. Twenty ounces of marinara sauce are then added. Seven pounds of toppings are then added. A thick layer of mozzarella cheese is then followed by onions, green peppers, mushrooms, homemade Italian sausage, hamburger and more mozzarella. It is baked in the oven, pepperoni added and then baked again before serving. The second stop was at The Buff Restaurant (located across from the University of Colorado campus) where Adam experienced – and highly enjoyed – their "Saddlebags", large pancakes with bacon or sausage mixed into the batter and topped with basted eggs. The Buff is known for hearty dishes with a creative twist like their rustic eggs benedict smother in sausage gravy and pecan-caramel quesadillas. The Saddlebags start with their homemade buttermilk batter. The bacon is also not fried, but baked. The meat is then cut up and added to the still cooking batter. For this episode's challenge, Adam visited West End Tavern to face the West End Wing King Challenge. Unlike all other chicken wing challenges that Adam has previously faced, this challenge was a quantity challenge, rather than a spicy challenge. Wherein he would have to finish off a bucket of 50 buffalo wings (altogether weighing in at about 5 pounds (2.3 kg)) in under 30 minutes; doing so would get him a free T-shirt, a spot on the Wall of Fame, and a coupon for a dozen free wings on a future visit. The wings are fried in hot oil twice to ensure crispiness. Traditional wing sauce is mixed with hot sauce, Worcestershire sauce, cayenne, celery salt, black pepper and melted butter. The wings are tossed in the sauce and then served in a bucket. Adam's strategy was to try to eat two wings per minute, covering the wings in blue cheese as he went. However, he only made it halfway before the tactic backfired on him as the rich sauce slowed him down considerably. Ultimately, Adam ran out of time, having consumed 36 out of the 50 wings. Besides Adam, around 70% of all challengers have failed to achieve victory. This is the second and final wing challenge Adam lost. Post-episode updates: According to media reports, Beau Jo's closed its Boulder location in September 2017 when its lease there ended in order to focus solely on a newer, larger location in Longmont.
Cleveland, OH	3 (41)	June 23, 2010	Man
Adam visited Cleveland, home to the Rock & Roll Hall of Fame and one of his personal "favorite cities", for their big eats. His first visit was to Steve's Gyros at Cleveland's West Side Market, which boasts 40,000 square feet of food and is Cleveland's oldest public marketplace, to try one of their jumbo gyros. The gyro starts with lettuce, tomatoes and onions, a spoonful of their secret sauce (a sour cream-based Tzatziki sauce that includes cucumbers, garlic and eight other secret ingredients, instead of the traditional yogurt base) and then nearly two pounds of lamb and beef that have been cooked on a rotating spit. Adam next visited Hot Sauce Williams, which has been serving crispy fried chicken and tender ribs on Cleveland's East Side since 1960, to sample their "Polish Boy", a pre-baked and deep-fried Kielbasa sausage on a bun topped with the restaurant's signature hot sauce, fries, coleslaw, five-hour smoked pulled pork shoulder and then more sauce. On February 27, Adam visited Melt Bar and Grilled in Lakewood (where customers with tattoos of sandwiches would get 25% off their meals at Melt "for life"). They serve grilled cheese sandwiches taken to the extreme such as the jalapeño and cream cheese packed "Big Popper" to the perogi packed Parmaggedon. Adam faced off with the Melt Challenge: a 4-pound (1.8 kg) grilled cheese sandwich (which uses nearly 3 1/2 pounds of 14 different cheeses. Herb and sweet cream cheeses are spread on three thick slices of grilled artisan bread. Then, slices of smoked Gouda, sharp cheddar, cheddar-Jack are added and then melted in the oven. Scoops of rich blue cheese, creamy goat and crumbly feta cheese are added before another round of melting. Slices of Swiss, pepper Jack, provolone were added before another short time in the oven. Slices of American, Muenster, and Havarti are then added before a final round in the oven.) The constructed sandwich is then served with a one-half pound (227 g) each of fries and homemade vinegar-based coleslaw. Prior to Adam, only two people had successfully finished the challenge. This challenge had no time limit. Adam finished half of the sandwich and the majority of the fries in the first 10 minutes, but struggled once the sandwich cooled. Adam was able to get a boost by adding the coleslaw to the rest of the sandwich, and he was able to complete the challenge. Adam won a Melt T-shirt as a reward. Post-episode update: According to media reports, Hot Sauce Williams closed for good in March 2018 when the owners chose to retire. Post-episode update: After filing for bankruptcy protection and closing several several locations in 2024, Melt Bar and Grill permanently closed its final location for good in January 2025.
Richmond, VA	4 (42)	June 30, 2010	Man
Adam visited Richmond, Virginia, the site of Patrick Henry's "Give me Liberty or give me Death!" speech, to experience their culinary creations with visits to Buz and Ned's Real BBQ, Black Sheep, and Caliente. At Buz and Ned's, Adam sampled a rack of hickory and oak smoked barbecued pork spareribs. To prep the ribs, they are brushed with a homemade sauce of Memphis style spices and worcestershire sauce. They are then smoked for four hours in a smoker with wet hickory and white oak wood. They are then glazed on the grill while cooking with a barbeque sauce mixture of Carolina and Memphis traditions. They sauce the ribs on the heat so the sugars in the sauce caramelize on the ribs. Black Sheep, the second stop, is known for its large submarine sandwiches (2 feet (61 cm) long and 2 1/2 pounds (1.1 kg)) known as "battleships", which get their name from actual historical U.S. military cruisers, such as the spicy shrimp stuffed U.S.S. Lafayette to the C.S.S Virginia piled high with Southern fried chicken livers. Adam tried a battleship called the "U.S.S. Brooklyn", a baguette filled with peach chutney, a full pound of Jamaican jerk chicken and cabbage and green onion slaw topped with roasted banana ketchup. Boneless chicken thighs are marinated overnight in traditional Jamaican jerk spices which combine scotch bonnet peppers, brown sugar, thyme, garlic, salt and green onions. The peach chutney is made by adding vinegar and crush red peppers to peach preserves. The roasted banana ketchup is made with bananas, rum, brown sugar, soy sauce and jerk seasoning. Finally, at Caliente, Adam squared off with the Stupid Wings Challenge, which had been defeated by only 30 of its 300 challengers up to this point. Eight jumbo wings are deep fried and doused in "stupid sauce" which consists of hot sauce, margerine, barbecue sauce, habanero powder, and cayenne pepper, plus recycled sauce from past challenges (which is kept in a "container of poor judgement", where the spices continue to marinate, thus making the sauce hotter over time) and 5 drops of pure capsaicin extract. Each wing is also stabbed with a fork so that the sauce reaches every part of the wings. Adam had to eat all eight wings in 30 minutes without the aid of any dairy products or bread. He was allowed to drink beer or iced tea, however. Before the challenge, Adam signed a waiver and admitted to the crowd that he was terrified of this challenge. He felt immediate pain from the first wing and though he ate fast, he thought of giving up by the seventh. He pressed on and managed to finish the entire challenge. For his efforts, Adam won an "I'm with Stupid" T-shirt. He called the Stupid Wings Challenge one of the hardest "in all three seasons". Post-episode updates: The Black Sheep closed for good in November 2017. Also, in 2016, Caliente closed down and became the Sheppard Street Tavern, which changed most of its menu but still features the Stupid Wings Challenge.
Salt Lake City, UT	5 (43)	July 7, 2010	Man
In Salt Lake City, Adam tried a pastrami and fry sauce-topped double cheeseburger called the "Double Crown Burger" at its namesake, Crown Burgers. Fry sauce is slathered on the toasted bottom bun and then chopped onion, lettuce and tomato are added. Crown Burger adds pickle relish and secret spices to their fry sauce. The pastrami that has been marinating in a broth infused with paprika and secret spices. Next, he tried the "Machine Gun" (a Moroccan-spice Merguez lamb sausage sandwich topped with Belgian frites at Bruges Waffles & Frites. Bruges is famous for their double fried French fries (called frites) and Belgian waffles loaded with toppings. A homemade French baguette is slathered with Andalouse mayonnaise). The Belgian condiment is made with basil, red bell pepper, garlic, Poupon mustard and dried cayenne pepper. Two links of the sausage are put in a basket along with the freshly cut frites and deep fried. The sausages are put on the bun, followed by the freshly tossed in salt frites. More of the Andalouse mayo is then poured on top. Finally, he took on the Hell Fire Challenge, which only 12 people out of 400 had beaten previously, at Kobe Sushi. Unlike past challenges, Adam had to qualify for the challenge first by eating one Level 4, Level 5, and Level 6 "Hell Fire" tuna roll, all increasing in heat. The actual challenge itself was six pieces of the Level 7 roll (the restaurant's hottest). Opened in 2008, Kobe makes all of their sauces in house. Kobe's Level 4 sauce is prepared with hot Sriracha sauce mixed with a blend of secret spices. Each level of sauce is twice as hot as the level prior. Level 5 adds red chili shichimi, a fiery Japanese spice blend. Level 6 uses dried red Thai chili, making it 40x hotter than a jalapeño. The level 7 roll contains seaweed, rice, lettuce, sprouts, tuna mixed with level 6 sauce and chili paste, a slice of jalapeño and an extra dose of red Chinese chili seeds. Adam was in visible pain by the time he finished Level 6 and commented that the milk, which was allowed, was not very effective in cooling the fire. Adam powered through the qualifying rounds and proceeded to the Level 7 roll, which he struggled through. But, in the end, he became the 13th person to beat the challenge and got a free T-shirt as a reward.
Phoenix, AZ	6 (44)	July 14, 2010	Food
Adam headed to the desert to sample the big food of Phoenix. His first stop was at Alice Cooperstown, named after and owned by Phoenix-based rock legend (and 2011 Rock and Roll Hall of Fame inductee) Alice Cooper, where he tried the "Big Unit" (named after former major league pitcher Randy Johnson, who, among other teams, has pitched for the Arizona Diamondbacks), a 22-inch (56 cm), 3-pound (1.4 kg) Vienna Beef hot dog with various toppings (including half a pound of chili, cheese sauce, bacon, grilled onions, beer soaked sauerkraut, relish, jalapeños, tomatoes and shredded cheese) stuffed in a baguette. Adam's "Big Unit" was served to him by none other than Cooper himself, who sat down with him to enjoy his own "Big Unit" (following Adam's visit, Alice Cooperstown added a new version of the "Big Unit", called the "'Adam Richmond Bases Loaded Big Unit", which featured toppings picked by Adam himself during the episode's taping). At the second stop, Los Reyes de la Torta, Adam tried the 2-pound (907 g) "Torta Del Rey." Beans are spread on a Telera roll which is then filled with pork, breaded beef and ham topped with mozzarella cheese. A grilled hot dog and chorizo omelet are added followed by tomatoes, onions, avocado and house made chipotle sauce. On March 18, Adam visited Chompie's New York Deli, located in Tempe (near the Arizona State University campus), for a showdown with the Ultimate Slider Challenge. In this challenge – which only one person out of 36 had defeated up to this point – Adam had 30 minutes to eat 12 of their Jewish sliders (Challah rolls filled with beef brisket (marinated in au jus and gravy), potato pancakes also known as latkes, and melted Monterey Jack cheese). Altogether it weighs in at 5 pounds (2.3 kg), with a 1/2-pound (227 g) side of their fried onion strings. The platter is also served with a bowl of au jus for dipping. The brisket has been cooked for four hours in a teriyaki and soy-based beef stock. Over a pound of the brisket is sliced up. One and a half pounds of the potato pancakes, which are made with onions, garlic powder and eggs, are fried on the grill and then deep fried. There Adam's fantasy sequence before the challenge saw him steal home plate as a member of Arizona State's baseball team. In the challenge, Adam ate the first 9 sliders before experiencing problems that ultimately slowed him down. With 10 sliders down and only four minutes left, he tried combining the last two sliders and onion strings into one large slider. But time ran out when he was about halfway through it. His picture was therefore posted on Chompie's Wall of Shame. The filming at Chompie's featured a special guest appearance by Sam Moore, formerly of R&B duo Sam & Dave. NOTE: Chompie's Scottsdale location was featured on the show in March 2020, 10 years later, in which the show's new host Casey Webb visited the restaurant to take on a new challenge known as the Day at the Deli Challenge. Post-episode update: Alice Cooperstown's longtime manager indicated that it was time to leave on an up note when the popular establishment shuttered in October 2017. Post-episode update: Chompie's Tempe location closed permanently in November 2022 to allow for future brand growth according to a company spokesperson.
Puerto Rico	7 (45)	July 21, 2010	Food
Adam traveled to Puerto Rico for some Caribbean-style eats. He first visited Restaurant Raices in San Juan. Opened in 2003, they are known among locals and visitors for their authentic Puerto Rican cuisine such as tostones, steak and shrimp tornado and mofongo. Their signature dish though is the Chuleta Kan-Kan (a three-inch thick, 7-pound (3.2 kg) deep-fried pork chop wrapped in crispy pork rind). Instead of making chicharrones with the pork rind, it is left on the chop to keep crispy texture and juicy flavor. The chop in marinated in garlic, culantro and other local spices. It is baked for 90 minutes and then deep fried. He next visited the El Churry food truck to try their take on the churrasco sandwich where it was invented in 1997. The "Mixto" is a half pound of grilled churrasco and a half pound of grilled chicken topped with "mayo-ketchup" sauce and French-fried potato sticks. The skirt steak and chicken breast are soaking two days in sofrito, a special marinade consisting of green peppers, garlic, onions and cilantro and then grilled. You also have the option to add bacon. Lettuce and tomatoes are put on bread, followed by the meats and other toppings. Finally he headed to La Vaca Brava, located in the mountains of Barranquitas, for the "Vaca Acosta" (English: "Sleeping Cow") Challenge: an 9-pound (4.1 kg) platter that includes 8-pound (3.6 kg) of sirloin steak on a bed of lettuce, barbecue sauce and one pound of fries. It is all covered with a mushroom, bacon, onion, and chorizo gravy and sprinkled with shredded Parmesan cheese, and had to be finished in under 40 minutes. The six steaks are all marinated for three days in the restaurant's sazon, a marinade of garlic, pepper and secret spices and then grilled. Only 3 people had completed the challenge up to this point. Adam started strong, fueled by the crowd's chants of "Hombre.. Contra... Comida!" (Man vs. Food), finishing the first steak in five minutes. However, as the challenge progressed, he slowed down as the meat sweats started. At the end of it, he finished about half of the fries and most of the steaks before time ran out. Had he finished the challenge, the meal would have been free and he would have received a T-shirt and $100 in cash.
Long Island, NY	8 (46)	July 28, 2010	Man
Adam returned to New York, this time visiting various restaurants throughout Long Island, located east of his native New York City. The adventure began at Ciao Baby in Massapequa Park, where Adam sampled the 7 1/2-pound (3.4 kg) "Nonna's Old World Meat Platter". The platter featured rigatoni topped with hot and sweet sausages, "softball-sized" Ciao Baby meatballs, homemade San Marzano tomato sauce, parsley and melted Parmesan cheese. The meatballs are made by seasoning a tub of ground beef with dried basil, oregano, onion, garlic, salt, pepper, Parmesan cheese and 10 eggs. The meatballs are formed and then baked in a broth of white wine for 45 minutes. The San Marzano tomatoes are simmered with garlic, salt, pepper and basil for five hours. He tried the dish in a traditional Italian-family dinner setting with the general manager's family. The second stop for Adam was the International Delight Café in Bellmore, which features over 80 unique flavors of gelato. There he tried "The World", a 2 1/2-US-gallon (9.5-litre), 10 pound plus gelato sundae (featuring 30 scoops of any combination of flavors) with toppings including Adam's chosen hot fudge, caramel, marshmallow cream, M and M's chocolate sprinkles, Belgian waffles and whipped cream. Adam starts by helping the owner make a batch of fiume (the Italian word for river) gelato, which he will use in his World sundae. They start by mixing vanilla and chocolate gelato with an amaretto base. Slices of cake are placed on top of the gelato and sprinkled with toasted coconut, almonds and liquid chocolate that will harden. More of the vanilla and chocolate mix is then placed on top. Adam also chooses the banana, caramel and fudge covered "moki do" and the chocolate, graham cracker and marshmallow "Smore" among others. Lastly, Port Royal Pub & Grille in Islip was the setting for this episode's challenge: a 7-pound (3.2 kg) platter of seafood (featuring snow crabs, shrimp, mussels, fried clam strips and stuffed flounder, along with sauteed vegetables, coleslaw, and a salad) known as the "Davy Jones Locker Challenge." Two locally caught flounder filets are stuffed with crab, shrimp and scallions and fried in bacon fat. The two pounds are then baked in the oven. The veggies are sauteed and one pound of clam strips are deep fried. Nearly four pounds of snow crab, shrimp and mussles are made into a boil and steamed together for 10 minutes in white wine, butter, garlic and lemon. Adam's task was to finish this meal in an hour, which was accomplished by only one person out of several dozen up to this point. Victory would get Adam the meal for free, a T-shirt, and a spot on the pub's Wall of Fame. During the challenge, Adam downed the crabs in the first 15 minutes, and then mixed the shrimp, mussels, vegetables, and salad into a bigger salad that he finished in just 5 minutes. After knocking out the clam strips and coleslaw, he struggled at the stuffed flounder. After lamenting the fact that he saved the flounder for last, Adam bounced back to finish the challenge with 12 minutes and 4 seconds to spare, becoming only the second man to ever defeat the challenge. NOTE: Following the airing of this episode and in honor of Adam's visit, Ciao Baby made a challenge out of Nonna's Old World Meat Platter; any challenger who can finish the entire meal in one sitting would get it for free. Post-episode update: According to multiple reviewers on Yelp and Foursquare, Ciao Baby and Port Royal Pub & Grille have both permanently closed.
Oklahoma City, OK	9 (47)	August 4, 2010	Man
The next leg of Adam's culinary quest took him to Oklahoma City, home to the world's largest cattle market - The Oklahoma National Stockyards. Right next door was Adam's first stop at Cattlemen's Steakhouse which is Oklahoma City's oldest restaurant. There he sampled the "Presidential T-Bone" (named by former U.S. president George H. W. Bush), which has been wet aged for 34 days. It is coated with two layers of secret seasonings and grilled before being drenched in reduced beef au jus. Adam then visited Sid's Diner (located in El Reno, 30 miles (48 km) west of Oklahoma City), where he tried the city's signature sandwich: a fried onion burger, which featured Spanish white onions cooked right into a 1/3-pound (151 g) beef patty, making the result a one-pound (454 g) creation. Sid's uses brick trowel spatulas to flatten the beef patties. Then, a handful of onions is pressed right into the patty. Adam topped his with pickles and mustard, also a tradition for onion burgers. This episode's challenge took place at the Steak & Catfish Barn in Edmond, where Adam took on the Fried Catfish Challenge (a.k.a. the Top Cat Challenge). He attempted to earn the title of "Top Cat" by eating 29 fried catfish in an hour, beating the record at the time of the taping which stood at 28. A normal serving of fried catfish at the Steak & Catfish Barn is a plate of five catfish. The catfish filets are cut down to 2 ounce pieces and then dredged in a mixture of cornmeal, black pepper, cayenne pepper and secret spices. The breaded catfish are then deep fried in peanut oil for seven minutes. The challenge took place once a year and was also served with two sides (Adam went for two sides of coleslaw). By combining bites of the catfish with the coleslaw, Adam was strong throughout, eating 25 catfish in the first 35 minutes with little trouble. He even ordered another serving of coleslaw when running out during the challenge and also used hot sauce to help with the flavor. he broke the record shortly thereafter, earning a trophy for his efforts. Post-episode update: The Steak & Catfish Barn closed for good in August 2013 when the owners decided to retire.
Kansas City, MO	10 (48)	August 11, 2010	Food
Adam visited Kansas City, Missouri for their unique food offerings and to get a taste of Kansas City–style barbecue. His first stop was at Oklahoma Joe's Barbecue, located in Kansas City, Kansas, where he tried some brisket and enjoyed some authentic Kansas City burnt ends. The brisket is first seasoned with a mixture of worcestershire, beef powder, sugar and spices. It is then smoked at low heat for 12-14 hours. The point of the brisket is then spiced again and then put back on the smoker for 6-8 hours. At the second stop, Stroud's Oak Ridge Manor, Adam sampled some of their signature pan-fried chicken and gravy-topped mashed potatoes. Housed in a converted log cabin, Stroud's has served home cooked recpes since 1933. Locally sourced chicken is hand trimmed and dredged in a mix of flour, salt and pepper. The chicken is then partially submerged in a cast iron pan of soybean oil. The gravy is then made by straining the cracklings from the fried chicken, fresh soybean oil, 2 cups of flour and milk. Adam then joins Stroud's manager for a chicken dinner accompanied by mashed potatoes, green beans, gravy and butter cinnamon rolls. This episode's challenge was at Papa Bob's Bar-B-Que in Bonner Springs, Kansas, where Adam attempted to be the first to defeat the Ultimate Destroyer Challenge. All the meat is cooked in Papa Bob's hickory wood smoker. The Ultimate Destroyer is a five-pound (2.3 kg) hoagie stacked with 7 different smoked meats (pulled pork, sliced pork, ham, turkey, hamburgers, beef brisket and sausage, all drenched in homemade barbecue sauce) and also served with 1 1/2 lb (680 g) of crinkle-cut fries that must be completed in 45 minutes or less. Winners get an "I Survived the Ultimate Destroyer" button and their picture posted on Papa Bob's Wall of Fame. At the time this episode was taped, nobody had ever defeated this challenge. The monstrous sandwich is created by spreading half a pound of pulled pork on the bottom bun, followed by half a pound of sliced pork. It is then drenched in bbq sauce and covered with two slices of bread. The second level consists of half of pound of smoked ham and half a pound of smoked turkey breast and covered with more sauce and bread. The third layer is three smoked half pound hamburger patties. More sauce and bread are followed by half a pound of brisket and half a pound of sliced sausage. More sauce and the top bun finish the sandwich. Adam started by cutting the sandwich in half, but soon realized that he had to work on even smaller chunks of the sandwich to try to finish it in the allotted time. He looked strong at first by finishing the first third of the sandwich in just 5 minutes, after which he started on the second segment while eating the fries. But the starchiness of the hoagie buns and white bread, combined with the dry texture of the smoked hamburger patties, ultimately proved too much for Adam. As time ran out, Adam had only finished half of the hoagie and about 65% of the fries. He was given a small "I Failed Miserably Trying to Eat the Ultimate Destroyer" pin for his attempt as he graciously accepted his defeat. Post-episode update: According to the Papa Bob's Bar-B-Que Facebook page, the owners decided to close the restaurant in July 2018 for personal reasons. Post-episode update: Also in 2014, Oklahoma Joe's changed its name to Joe's Kansas City Bar-B-Que.
Indianapolis, IN	11 (49)	August 18, 2010	Food*
Adam visited Indianapolis, home of the legendary Indianapolis 500 auto race, "The Greatest Spectacle in Racing." His first stop was the Edwards Drive-In, open since 1958, known for its homemade root beer, crispy onion rings, and its signature 1/2-pound (227 g), deep-fried Pork Tenderloin Sandwich. A 5 oz. pork cutlet is cut off the loin and then tenderized with a hammer. It is dipped in egg wash and coated in cracker crumbs before cooling in the fryer for 12 hours. It is then deep fried without a basket. It is topped with lettuce, pickles, onions and tomatoes. Adam, however, was presented with a "Man"-sized, 9-pound (4.1 kg) version of the sandwich at his table, much to his surprise. Next, Adam visited the Gray Bros. Cafeteria, located in Mooresville, to sample their homemade ketchup-topped meat loaf and strawberry pie. To make the meatloaf, oats, roasted red and green peppers, onions, salt, Worcester sauce and eggs to eight pounds of ground beef. The meat is then kneaded and placed in the oven where it bakes twice, once by itself and then once with the ketchup-based sauce. A handmade pie crust is packed with fresh strawberries and the homemade glaze is poured over it and then covered with whipped cream. After paying a visit to the Indianapolis Motor Speedway to get helpful motivation from IRL racer Tony Kanaan and run his own personal race, Adam took on the Big Ugly Burger Challenge at Bub's Burgers & Ice Cream in Carmel. His challenge was to try to consume four of their 22-ounce (624 g) "Big Ugly" burgers. Each burger weighs one pound each after frying and is placed on a half pound bun. Altogether that made it a 6-pound (2.7 kg) challenge. The challenge had no time limit, and eating one burger got the challenger a 4 in × 6 in (102 mm × 152 mm) photograph of them on the restaurant's "Champions of the Big Ugly" Wall of Fame, while two burgers increases the picture size to 8×10. Three burgers nets them a poster-sized picture on the Wall of Fame, and four places a life-size cutout of the challenger on the Wall. In 42,000 attempts prior to Adam's, no one had ever been able to eat four Big Ugly Burgers. 95% of previous challengers managed to eat one burger, but only 20% have finished two and just three challengers had ever eaten three. Opened in 2003, Bub's serves ice cream besides an escalating array of burgers. A total of 22 ounces of ground beef are shaped into a ball and then press between two pie plates. It is then sprinkled with Bub's secret seasoning and cooked four minutes on both sides. Making the challenge harder was the fact that each bun was brushed with an entire stick of butter. It is then served with or without lettuce, tomato, onion and pickles. During the challenge, Adam ate the first burger in 10 minutes with no issues, and then finished the second at the 22-minute mark. But for Adam though, he was visibly full by the time he started the third burger, and after just over an hour, he was finally forced to give up after eating a total of 2 1/4 burgers, which was good enough for an 8 in × 10 in (203 mm × 254 mm) picture of himself on the Wall of Fame. Ultimately, however, Adam called it a victory for Food since he did not eat four burgers as he intended to, even though he technically did win. Post-episode update: Edwards Drive-In closed in January 2022. According to the owner, the rising cost of food and the lack of labor were among the factors in the decision to close the restaurant. Post-episode update: Gray Bros. Cafeteria closed in June 2025. The owners cited inflation, cost of ingredients and change in the restaurant industry as reasons for the decision. Post-episode update: Competitive eater James Webb set the current Big Ugly record, downing six Big Uglys in just over 36 minutes.
Jersey Shore	12 (50)	August 25, 2010	Man
Adam headed to the Jersey Shore for some beachside cuisine. At the first stop, Maruca's Tomato Pies (located on the boardwalk in Seaside Park), he tried a Trenton-style tomato pie. The tomato pie, in this case, was a thin crust topped with a bed of mozzarella cheese and a spiral of tomato sauce on top of the cheese. You start out making the pie by using the special hot metal pizza press to ensure uniform quality. The dough is then stretched and 1 1/2 pounds of their propriety cheese blend is spread on top. The tomato sauce is then swirled on top with a watering can. The 24-inch pie is then baked for six minutes in their 500-degree roto flex oven. Adam also visited Hoffman's Ice Cream in Point Pleasant Beach to help prepare gallons of their award-winning ice cream flavor, Fudge Mint Cookie. A five-gallon bag of 16 percent butterfat ice cream mixture is poured into their ice cream machine. It simultaneously mixes and chills the cream forming the ice cream crystals. The mint flavoring is then poured in. After several minutes, the ice cream is released into a tub while simultaneously pouring in fudge and crushed cookies. Opened in 1976, Hoffman's features over 35 different flavors in waffle cones, regular cones or sundaes. Their biggest sundae is called the "Octopus", a large 8-scoop, 8-topping sundae topped off with whipped cream in the shape of an octopus, hence the name, that weighs in at nearly three pounds. Eight homemade flavors are scooped out and topped with hot fudge, caramel, strawberries, cake crunch, cookie dough, chocolate syrup, marshmallows, cookie and then finished with a whipped cream octopus on top. This was all before Adam took on the Ludicrous Wings Challenge at The Chicken or the Egg in Beach Haven. The Chicken or the Egg serves breakfast 24/7, but is known for their chicken wings. The jumbo wings come tossed in one of 15 signatures sauces ranging from teriyaki to the incendiary Ludicrous. This challenge involves eating 12 jumbo-sized habanero-infused chicken wings. To make the Ludicrous sauce regular hot sauce is mixed with dried habanero and cayenne, two secret spices, and an ultra-spicy habanero extract dubbed as "Devil's Blood". The Devil's Blood is measured at 1,000,000 scoville units and is 400 times hotter than a fresh jalapeño. The wings are first breaded and fried (hot sauce is used to make the flour breading stick to the wings.) After frying the wings are drenched in the Ludicrous sauce. Adam had just 15 minutes to eat all 12 wings. Before the challenge, he noted that this was the most intense spicy wings challenge he would be facing, as it weighed in at over 2 pounds (907 g) (which is more than any previous challenge of this kind weighed). Prior to Adam's attempt, three out of thousands of challengers have beaten this challenge. During the challenge, Adam was allowed to drink milk or beer (both were provided) along with blue cheese sauce and (optional) celery and carrot sticks. He employed a strategy of removing all the meat from the bones first (which he spent the first seven minutes doing before taking the first bite). Then he started eating the meat in forkfuls. Adam ate fast, but struggled through the intense heat of the sauce. Though he did not have enough time to use any cooling agents during the challenge due to time constraints, Adam's game plan worked as he was able to finish the entire challenge with only two seconds left. As a reward for winning, Adam earned a T-shirt and a spot on the "Wall of Flame".
Syracuse, NY	13 (51)	September 1, 2010	Man
Adam stopped by Syracuse, home to Syracuse University. On June 8, he paid a visit to the biker-themed Dinosaur Bar-B-Que, which brings bbq styles from all over the country and gives them their own flair. There he tried the "Pork-Sket", a large sandwich with half a pound each of beef brisket and pulled pork (both slow-cooked at low heat) topped with melted sharp white cheddar, pickled jalapeño peppers and coleslaw. The pork and brisket are seasoned with a Texas-style dry rub. They are then cooked in an oiler that only uses the indirect heat of wood smoke. They are then both cooked for 12-15 hours at 185 degrees. The pork shoulder and brisket are pulled from the smoked and covered with a Carolina-style mop sauce. After pulling apart the pork and slicing the brisket, half a pound of each is put into a hot skillet and covered with a thick, sweet bbq sauce. The cheese it melted over the meat, which is then placed on a bun and topped with the jalapenos and coleslaw. The next day, Adam traveled to Liverpool (just north of Syracuse) to try red frankfurters and white Coney dogs at Heid's of Liverpool. The frankfurters are made specifically for Heid's by a local sausage maker using a special recipe of beef, pork and spices. The Coney dogs are made with pork, veal, spices and egg whites. While enjoying a mixed double (one red frankfurter and one white Coney on a single bun with homemade brown mustard), Adam was visited by Syracuse Orange men's basketball coach and Heid's regular Jim Boeheim. On June 10, the show filmed a segment at Mother's Cupboard, where all the breakfast dishes are enormous, including the pancakes, of which diners are warned in the menu "Don't try to eat two. You'll hurt yourself." Adam was there though to take on the Frittata Challenge: a 6-pound (2.7 kg) dish loaded with pepperoni, broccoli, Italian sausage, peppers, onions, and a pound of home fries, all held together by four scrambled eggs and also topped with toasted ends of Italian bread. The home fries, broccoli and pepperoni are cooked together, before a bowlful of the sausage, peppers and onion mixture is added and the eggs folded in. This challenge had no time limit, but Adam did have to follow the restaurant's "mother"-themed rules (sitting up straight, keeping elbows off the table, etc.). Before the challenge, Adam fantasized himself as a member of Syracuse University's lacrosse team. During the challenge (which 95% of several thousand challengers had failed up to this point), he employed a strategy of tackling each pound of the frittata in separate bowls, which would allow him to let the steam out of the frittata. The strategy worked in Adam's favor, but the potatoes started to fill him up after he finished the first 4 pounds (1.8 kg). Staying determined, though, Adam used hot sauce to give his frittata more flavor and he ultimately went on to finish the challenge; he was rewarded with a free T-shirt and a spot on the restaurant's Wall of Fame.
Portland, ME	14 (52)	September 8, 2010	Man
Adam traveled east to Portland, Maine to enjoy New England–style cuisine. On July 6, he visited the Lobster Shack Restaurant in Cape Elizabeth to sample steamed lobster with drawn butter, as well as a lobster roll. The day before, Adam visited Nosh Kitchen Bar in Portland, where he tried bacon-dusted fries and the Apocalypse Now Burger, a 4-patty cheeseburger topped with pork belly, bacon, foie gras, macerated cherry spread, and homemade mayonnaise. For this episode's challenge, Adam went up against the 5-pound (2.3 kg) Manimal Challenge (which only 4 people out of dozens had completed before this episode was taped) at the Tradewinds Café in Arundel. Adam had to eat an 8-patty onion-topped cheeseburger (known as the "Ochoburger"), 2 coleslaw-topped hot dogs, a side of crinkle-cut fries, a soda, and a "Mother Futcher" milkshake (made with three scoops of butter pecan ice cream, milk, and Grandmother Futcher's coffee cake) – all in under 20 minutes. Adam started the challenge by splitting the Ochoburger in half, and though he struggled with how hot the burger was, his strategy allowed him to finish it all in the first 5 minutes; next, he went after the hot dogs, but started to slow down after eating the first one. Undeterred, Adam finished the second hot dog, the fries and the soda with 7 minutes to go, leaving him with the milkshake. While struggling with the thickness of the shake (and the amount of chewing needed for the coffee cake), Adam went on to finish it with only 5 minutes to go; his time of 15 minutes set a new record for the challenge. He became the 5th person to complete the challenge, and as a reward for finishing, he won a "Manimal" T-shirt.
Niagara Falls	15 (53)	September 15, 2010	Food
Adam headed to Niagara Falls. His first stop was the Riverstone Grill, located in Grand Island, New York, where he tried the "Bone in the Stone", which consists of a 48-ounce (1.4 kg) ribeye steak topped with creamy blue cheese, crumbled blue cheese, and crispy onion strings, while served over a bed of regular and sweet potato fries and with a side of roasted corn on the cob; While most restaurants would cut a beef loin in half and make two sirloins off of each bone, Riverstone did not have power tools to do so when they started so they decided to keep both sirloins attached. After dry aging for 10 days, the loin is coated in spices and olive oil. After grilling five minutes on each side, it is finished cooking in a convection oven. Adam's second stop was at Lewiston, New York's Silo Restaurant, an old coal silo that fueled passing ships that was converted into a waterfront eatery in 1998. There he tried the "Haystack", a large toasted roll stuffed with one pound (454 g) of Angus steak, melted mozzarella cheese, and crispy hash browns. The Angus steak is seasoned, fried and chopped before the mozzarella cheese is melted on top. The deep fried hash browns are then added and everything is then loaded onto the toasted bun. Adam's challenge this week was at Mick & Angelo's Eatery & Bar (located on Lundy's Lane in Niagara Falls, Ontario), where he was faced with the 7-pound (3.2 kg) Italian Challenge: a 10-course meal consisting of lasagna, spaghetti and meatballs, cannelloni, manicotti, hot Italian sausage, chicken Parmesan, a whole loaf of garlic bread, a cup of Italian wedding soup, a salad, and an apple crisp dessert (served with ice cream), all of which must be eaten in under an hour and a half. Prior to Adam's attempt, 300 people had attempted this challenge with only 20 completing it successfully. The lasagna was made with beef, sauce and ricotta, romano and mozzarella cheeses. The cannelloni was stuffed with beef and ricotta and the manicotti with egg ricotta and parsley. During the challenge, Adam employed a strategy of combining many of the dishes, such as putting the sausage on the spaghetti and meatballs, and stuffing the chicken Parmesan into the garlic bread, before eating. He finished the lasagna in only 3 minutes before going at the manicotti, which he then finished in the next 4 minutes. At 11 minutes, he finished the cannelloni and went to work on his chicken Parmesan sandwich. He finished it at the 30-minute mark, after which he proceeded to down the sausage, soup and salad. With 40 minutes to go, Adam began to struggle at the spaghetti and meatballs. To help his taste buds, Adam ate the dessert, but soon realized that he was unable to continue with the spaghetti and meatballs, forcing him to give up the challenge with 24 minutes to go. Had Adam finished, he would have received a T-shirt and a spot on the restaurant's Wall of Fame; instead, his photo went onto the Wall of Shame. The segment at Mick & Angelo's Eatery & Bar is the first that the show has ever filmed in Canada. Post-episode update: According to the Riverstone Grill's Twitter account, the restaurant closed permanently on April 2, 2012.
Butte, MT	16 (54)	September 22, 2010	Man
In this episode, Adam visited Butte for more mountain-style eats. He first visited Joe's Pasty Shop. Open since 1947, Joe's features traditional British meat pies known as a pasty, which is ground beef, round steak, potatoes and onions in a firm crust. The ingredients are more held together inside the dough than pot pies or other meat pies so that miners in Butte's history could carry them in their lunch boxes. Adam tried his with a tomato sauce and a topping of chili, cheese and onions. Ground beef is combined with round steak. Chopped russet potatoes and chopped onions are then added to the mixture which is then seasoned with salt and pepper. A vintage dough roller from the 1960's is used to keep each roll of dough uniform. A cup of the meat mixture is then added and the pasty crimped closed. It is then baked in a 400 degree oven for one hour. It is then topped with chili, cheese and onions. For his second stop, Adam visited Muzz and Stan's Freeway Tavern where he tried a local sandwich called the "Wop Chop", a deep-fried pork chop sandwich. Pork loin is trimmed and pounded flat in a secret way. The pork patty is then coated with secret ingredients before being dipped in a secret batter and deep fried in soybean oil. it is finally topped with mustard, pickles and onions. For this episode's challenge (taped during the weekend of August 7–8,), Adam went to Trimbo's Pizza for the Jumboli Challenge, a 5-pound (2.3 kg) stromboli that must be eaten in an hour or less. Opened in 2007, Trimbo's features serves up some of the most authentic New York style pizzas in the West. One and a half pounds of dough, the equivalent of a large pizza pie, is stretched out and covered with three and half pounds of ingredients. A layer of mozzarella begins followed by layers of meat (50 slices of pepperoni, two cups of spicy Italian sausage, genoa salami, capicola and homemade meatballs) which are each topped with more mozzarella cheese and tomato sauce. Red peppers, garlic, onions, mushrooms and black olives are added along with ricotta cheese. At the time Adam faced it, no one had ever beaten this challenge. In addition to only having an hour to eat and retain the Jumboli, Adam was also not to leave the table during the challenge. He started off very strong, despite the fact that the stromboli was still very hot, Adam finished the first half within the first 10 minutes. However, as the stromboli cooled, the cheese started to solidify and Adam hit the "food wall", visibly struggling as he got down to the final four bites. But, he was able to beat the challenge with 14 minutes to spare and was the first one to defeat it. For his efforts, he received a T-shirt and an 8 in × 10 in (203 mm × 254 mm) picture on the Wall of Fame. Post-episode update: According to an article on The Montana Standard, Trimbo's closed for good on May 1, 2016, citing the construction of a multi-story building next door as well as a lull in business during the winter seasons.
Sacramento, CA	17 (55)	September 29, 2010	Food
The next stop on Adam's culinary tour was Sacramento, the capital of California. His first stop was the California State Fair at the Cal Expo, where he tried various deep-fried treats served on sticks. 2-1/2 weeks during the summer, over 100 vendors serve a variety of food to the hungry fair attendees. He tried deep-fried catfish on a stick at Minnie's Cornbread House. Then he tried the "Twister Dog", a hot dog on a stick wrapped with a "Tornado Potato" (a potato cut in a spiral fashion) at its namesake, Tornado Potato. An Idaho potato is mounted on a power drill and put through a custom made slicer that cuts it in the spiral shape of a tornado. The potato is then fitted around a 1/4 pound hot dog and deep fried. You can also then add toppings such as chili and cheese if you choose. Finally, he visited Sweet Cheeks where they deep fry all types of dessert such as cheesecake, cookie dough and brownies. However, Adam tried the "King Twinkie", three Twinkies dipped in pancake batter and deep-fried. It is then dusted with powdered sugar and topped with chocolate sauce. Adam's second stop was Jim-Denny's, located in Downtown Sacramento, which is well known for their large breakfasts. The pancakes there are so big that they do not fit onto a plate. Adam tried "The Works", a large 3-egg omelet filled with five vegetables (spinach, mushrooms, bell peppers, tomatoes and green chilies), four meats (country style ham, chicken apple sausage, pork sausage and bacon), Jack and cheddar cheeses, and served with hash browns and a large pancake on the side. This episode's challenge was at Parker's Hot Dogs, located in Roseville. Here, Adam went up against the Knucklehead Challenge: five 1/4-pound (113 g) steamed hot dogs stuffed into a 16-inch (41 cm) steamed baguette and smothered with 3 pounds (1.4 kg) of chili, plus jalapeño nacho cheese, tomatoes, diced onions, pickles, and tortilla strips. Served with a 1-pound (454 g) side of fries. This challenge weighed in at just over 5 pounds (2.3 kg), which Adam had to finish it in under 20 minutes. Prior to Adam, only one person out of 100 had previously finished this challenge. During the challenge, Adam employed a strategy given to him by the challenge's only winner, Roland Lujan (who finished the challenge in just 9 minutes and 3 seconds): eat the hot dogs first. Then attack the bun and let the chili soak the fries so that they would be easier to consume. Roland was among the crowd on hand to cheer on Adam, who started off strong by eating all the hot dogs in the first 4 minutes. He started to slow down when consuming the chili and bun, but managed to finish off 3 pounds (1.4 kg) of the challenge with 8 minutes to go. It was then that the beans of the chili started to give him trouble, and this ultimately led to his downfall. While he fought hard to the end, Adam ran out of time with less than half the chili and fries remaining.
Des Moines, IA	18 (56)	October 6, 2010	Food
Adam traveled to Des Moines to check out its culinary scene. The first stop was High Life Lounge, known for serving comfort food with a twist. There he sampled broasted chicken and bacon-wrapped tater tots. A slice of thick cut bacon is wrapped around a tater tot and slice of pickled jalapeño. Each order of tots is then deep fried in canola oil and covered with shredded cheese. The chicken was breaded after marinating in a salt brine for 24 hours before being cooked in the broaster. Broasting seals in the juices and flavor into the chicken. Then he visited Black Market Pizza in Ames, which is known for creating pizzas based on popular sandwiches, such as the BLT, Bacon Cheeseburger and Chili Cheese Dog. Adam took part in creating and eating their Reuben pizza. The pizza starts with their unique sweet potato crust. Thousand Island dressing is spread on the crust and it is layed with swiss cheese. Sliced corned beef is piled on before it is sprinkled with caraway seeds. Sauerkraut covers the corned beef before mozzarella cheese tops it off before it is baked. A pickle is then added to each baked slice. The challenge took place at Jethro's BBQ, where Adam took on the Adam Emmenecker Challenge (named after the former Drake University basketball star). For the challenge, he had to finish off a huge sandwich (containing many of Emmenecker's favorite foods). It starts with a 12 inch pork tenderloin, followed by two buffalo chicken tenders, an angus steak cheeseburger, applewood smoked bacon, one pound of beef brisket and two fried white cheddar cheese cubes. It is then all smothered in white cheddar cheese sauce and topped with a spicy pickle. The challenge also has a 1-pound (454 g) side of waffle fries. He had to finish everything in under 15 minutes. Prior to Adam, just two people out of several hundred had ever finished this challenge successfully. Before the challenge, Adam was impressed with the making of the sandwich and was excited to begin. To assemble the sandwich, they start with half of the pork tenderloin, followed by one of the chicken tenders. The bacon cheeseburger is added, followed by the brisket, the fried cheese cubes, the second buffalo chicken tender, the white cheddar sauce and finally the other half of the tenderloin. He decided to split the sandwich into segments, costing him a bit of time, and during the challenge was surprised by the heat of the spicy pickle. Although he took down half of the meats and the two cheese cubes, the volume of the sandwich and waffle fries ultimately proved too much and after trying to combine the remaining parts of the sandwich together, time ran out on the challenge with more than 2 pounds (907 g) to go. Adam's picture which went on the Wall of Shame was dated August 16, 2010. Emmenecker himself made a cameo to cheer Adam on with about 4 minutes left in the challenge. Post-episode update: Black Market Pizza closed in April 2015 due to high overhead costs and being located in a bad location, according to the owner. They had initially planned to continue in a food truck and on grocery store shelves. But, they did not do so.
Knoxville, TN	19 (57)	October 13, 2010	Man
In this episode, Adam headed to Knoxville, Tennessee, home of the University of Tennessee. His first stop was Ye Olde Steak House, located on Chapman Highway in South Knoxville, which allows customers to order any size steak or cut of meat they choose. Opened in 1968, they serve every cut of meat from porterhouse to prime rib. Adam tried a 60-ounce (1.7 kg) New York strip. They butterflied and trimmed his steak and brushed it with a mixture of butter and seasonings. After placing it on the grill, they sprinkle it with pepper. After broiling the steak on a grill, it was transferred to a skillet where it was seared. Then, it was back on the grill where it was coated with herb butter. Adam enjoyed his steak so much, it left him speechless. Adam's second stop was at Dixson's Bar-B-Q where he tried a Pig Burger, which is a ground pork burger. The patty is made from rib trimmings, which are ground and mixed with seasonings. The patties are then placed in a dry skillet with water added to steam them. A sweet vidalia onion is then sliced up and placed on top of the patties while they steam. The finished patties are then placed between two slices of white bread and doused in hot and sweet barbecue sauces. For this episode's challenge, Adam ventured to Sweet P's Barbeque and Soul House to take on the El Gigante Comida Challenge: a 4-pound (1.8 kg) "Gigante" Burrito (filled with barbecued pulled pork, white and pinto beans, coleslaw, shredded cheddar cheese, and barbecue sauce), along with a 1/2 pound (0.23 kg) each of macaroni and cheese and banana pudding in under an hour. Dozens had tried this challenge prior to Adam, but no one had ever succeeded. The burrito was so massive that it required 4 tortillas to build. Before the challenge, Adam's fantasy sequence saw him channeling East Tennessee native Davy Crockett while battling, then sharing a burrito with a bear. Opened in 2005, Sweet P's augments their bbq offerings with Tex-Mex inspired fare. Pork butts with a brown sugar based rub that have been smoked 14 hours over hickory and white oak are chopped up and two pounds are laid on top of three tortillas. Nearly a pound of white and pinto beans are added, followed by coleslaw. Half a pound of shredded cheese top the burrito, which is then coated with barbecue sauce. A fourth tortilla is needed for containment purposes when rolling up the burrito. Adam started the challenge by attacking the burrito first, and looked strong out of the gate by finishing half of it in the first five minutes. But, he began to fill up on the second half. Adam then decided to combine bites of the macaroni and cheese with the burrito. At 22 minutes, Adam finished the macaroni and cheese, but struggled with the last few bites of the burrito. It was then that he realized that he had not previously won any burrito challenges on the show. So, he pushed himself to finish off the burrito at the 25-minute mark, leaving him with only the banana pudding. The pudding posed no problem for Adam as he easily ate it all at the 29-minute mark to win the challenge. He won a free T-shirt and a poster as a reward for being the first person to ever beat the challenge. Post-episode update: According to multiple reviewers on Yelp and Foursquare, Dixson's Bar-B-Q has permanently closed.
Ann Arbor, MI	20 (58)	October 20, 2010	Man
For the finale of the third season, Adam visited Ann Arbor, Michigan to experience life at the University of Michigan and its culinary offerings. The first segment of this episode took place at Krazy Jim's Blimpy Burger (filmed on September 7),. Opened since 1953, Blimpy offers over 30 different toppings for their burgers ranging from fried eggs to peppers to salami. Unlike most burger restaurants, Blimpy grinds their meat by hand every day with each patty weighing only one-tenth of a pound (45 g)). Most orders average anywhere from two to five patties with the record as of the episode being 43 patties. There are nine grilled items to choose from to top the burgers, along with four bun choices, six choices of cheese and 12 condiments. That equals out to 2,147,483,648 different burger combinations with a range of 2-5 patties. Adam tried a 5-patty "Blimpy Burger" topped with grilled onions squirted with Worcestershire sauce, a fried egg, bacon, and blue and Swiss cheeses. He also chose stone ground mustard, ketchup, black olives, lettuce and tomatoes as his condiments. Adam also visited the Maize and Blue Delicatessen (filmed on September 6), where they serve over 85 enormous deli sandwiches. such as the Maize and Blue Special and the Running back Lunch. Adam tried the "Triple Play Reuben", a corned beef and pastrami sandwich on thick cut sourdough rye bread topped with sauerkraut, Swiss and Jarlsberg cheeses, and Russian dressing and grilled on a sandwich press. With at least a quarter pound of each meat, the sandwich weighs over half a pound. On September 9, Adam visited Tios Mexican Café to do battle with the Mount Nachismo Challenge, a 5-pound (2.3 kg) plate of loaded, multi-layered nachos. Opened in 1986, Tios serves classic Mexican dishes next to modern twists like blue cheese cole slaw. A huge mound of tortilla chips is covered with a big layer of homemade refried beans to form the foundation. Shredded Monterrey Jack and cheddar cheeses are poured on to cover everything and the platter is topped with more chips. Scoops of shredded chicken and pulled pork are added along with ground beef. More jack and cheddar cheese are added and the platter is put into the oven to bake for five minutes. Tomatoes, onions, green peppers, black olives are sprinkled on along with scoops of sour cream and guacamole. A crown of chips and spicy queso is the final addition to the platter. He had to complete the entire platter in under 45 minutes. This challenge is daunting enough that it has defeated over 90% of its previous challengers. Adam started the challenge strong by eating two-thirds of the nachos in the first 30 minutes, but soon after, the beans started to slow him down. Fighting hard, Adam took it down to the wire and finished the challenge with just 3 minutes to spare. For his victory, Adam received a T-shirt and a spot on the café's Wall of Fame.
