= Amazing Eats =

American food reality television series

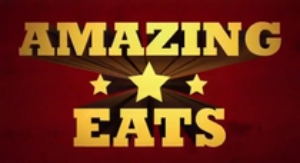
- Genre: Food Reality, Spin-off
- Presented by: Adam Richman
- Composers: Audio Network, Pimp Audio
- Country of origin: United States
- Original language: English
- No. of seasons: 1
- No. of episodes: 13

Production
- Executive producers: Matt Sharp, Adam Richman
- Producers: Bonnie Biggs, Dan Kornfeld
- Cinematography: Peter Fackler, Scott Sans, Dan Akiba, Dan Walworth
- Editors: John Gill, Bobby Munster, Keith Krimbel, Liam Lawyer, Scott Besselle, Caton Clarke, Mike Parenti, Bert Mains
- Camera setup: Multi-camera
- Running time: 21 minutes
- Production company: Sharp Entertainment

Original release
- Network: Travel Channel
- Release: January 11 – April 4, 2012

Amazing Eats is an American food reality television series that premiered on January 11, 2012, on the Travel Channel. The program is hosted by actor and food enthusiast Adam Richman. In each episode, Richman tracks down cuisines of the United States.

Episodes air every Wednesday at 9pm EST in place of Richman's popular series Man v. Food during its mid-season break. The episodes consist primarily of footage from Man v. Food and Man v. Food Nation re-edited by theme instead of city, and with the eating challenge segments omitted.

== Premise ==
In Amazing Eats, Adam Richman travels the United States to visit food establishments for a taste of the specialties they serve up. Every episode starts off with a brief history lesson about the specialty food that is featured.

Opening: "Magnificent mouth-watering foods. You can find it all across our great nation. And I'm on a quest to taste some of the best. This isn't just food. These aren't just meals. These are the incredible edibles that just can't be beat. This is Amazing Eats!"

== Episodes ==
No.	Title	Original release date
1	"Pork-A-Palooza"	January 11, 2012
In the season premiere host Adam Richman starts his culinary journey by sampling pork prepared in five dishes at eateries in five states. Stops include: Slows Bar-B-Q in Detroit, Michigan, for the "Triple Threat Pork", a packed sandwich filled with pulled pork, grilled ham and bacon; Nosh Kitchen Bar in Portland, Maine, to try their "Apocalypse Now Burger", four bacon cheeseburgers topped with pork belly and foie gras; Iron Barley in St. Louis, Missouri, with their oak-roasted pork loin; Tommy DiNic's in Philadelphia for a roast-pork sandwich that rivals the cheesesteak; and The Pit in Raleigh, North Carolina, for an authentic whole hog barbecue.
2	"Beefy Burgers"	January 11, 2012
Adam tries the beefiest burgers at six of the best burger joints across the country. Stops include: Haven Brothers Diner in Providence, Rhode Island, for their "Triple Murder Burger" topped with bacon, eggs, onions and mushrooms; Frontier Restaurant in Albuquerque, New Mexico, trying their green chili cheeseburger, the "Bonanza Burger"; Big Jud's in Boise, Idaho, home of one of the biggest burgers in the world, the "Double Big Jud"; Krazy Jim's Blimpy Burger in Ann Arbor, Michigan, with their high stacked burgers; Kroll's West in Green Bay, Wisconsin, for their famous "butter burgers"; and Thurman Café in Columbus, Ohio, for their "Thurman Burger" and the messy "Thurmanator" burger.
3	"Cheesy Goodness"	January 18, 2012
Adam samples the cheesiest cheese dishes across the country. Stops include: Tom + Chee in Newport, Kentucky, for "The Armagoetta", a fried onion, hot pepper, hot mustard and goetta grill cheese sandwich; Big Lou's Pizza in San Antonio, Texas, testing his limit on the "Big Lou 42": a 42-inch 30-pound pizza pie; D'Arcy's Pint in Springfield, Illinois, for their signature "Horseshoe", an open-faced sandwich made with Texas toast, meat, crinkle-cut fries, and cheese sauce; Amy Ruth's in Harlem, New York, trying their oven-baked four-cheese macaroni and cheese (clip previously unseen); Ted's Restaurant in Meriden, Connecticut, to try their steamed cheeseburgers w/ gooey white cheddar cheese; and finally, Melt Bar and Grilled in Lakewood, Ohio, with their four-pound grilled cheese sandwiches filled with 14 cheeses.
4	"Juicy Bites"	January 25, 2012
Stops include: Al's Beef in Chicago, Illinois, to try their soaked juicy Italian beef sandwich; The Salt Lick in Driftwood, Texas, for their succulent open-pit barbecue of brisket, ribs and sausage; Yoder's Restaurant in Sarasota, Florida, for their crispy Amish-style pressure-fried chicken; Hot 'n' Juicy Crawfish in Las Vegas, Nevada, for their crawfish served in their signature spice-laden sauce; and finally, Matt's Bar and the 5-8 Club in Minneapolis, Minnesota, to decide which establishment makes the better "Juicy Lucy" burgers: a slice of cheese melted inside a hamburger patty.
5	"Fiery Flavors"	February 1, 2012
Adam samples five spicy dishes. Stops included: Angel's BBQ in Savannah, Georgia, home to a one-pound pulled pork sandwich topped with the four-pepper "Voodoo Juice" (which includes two ounces of the deadly ghost chili); Flying Pie Pizzeria in Boise, Idaho, for the "Triple Habanero Pizza", a grilled chicken-black olive pizza made fiery with the usage of an 18-habanero pepper sauce; Prince's Hot Chicken Shack in Nashville, Tennessee, for their hot chicken, loaded with cayenne and secret spices; Giovanni's Aloha Shrimp Truck in Kahuku, Hawaii, for their piri piri-infused "Hot and Spicy" Shrimp; and finally, the East Coast Grill in Boston, where he experienced their ghost chili-riddled "Pasta from Hell" during the restaurant's famed "Hell Night".
6	"Saucy"	February 8, 2012
Adam tastes the sauciest dishes in the country. Stops include: Phil's BBQ in San Diego, California, to try the "El Toro", a sandwich of tri-tip steak glazed with sweet barbecue sauce; Crown Burgers in Salt Lake City, Utah, for pastrami-topped cheeseburgers with Utah's favorite condiment, fry sauce; L & B Spumoni Gardens in Bensonhurst, Brooklyn for "The Square", a sicilian pizza featuring San Marzano tomato sauce on top of the cheese; Chaps Charcoal Restaurant in Baltimore, Maryland, for pit beef sandwiches loaded with "Tiger Sauce" (a mix of horseradish and mayonnaise) and even barbecue sauce; and finally, Sweet Potatoes Endearing Food (one of Adam's favorite restaurants) in Savannah, Georgia, for their peach-glazed barbecue chicken, made with a barbecue sauce featuring canned peaches (with syrup) and the Creole staple, "Trinity" (onions, peppers, and celery). During the credits, a montage of spicy sauces (from some of Adam's previous challenges) is shown.
7	"Fried Feasts"	February 15, 2012
Adam samples the best fried foods in the country. Stops include: Stroud's Oak Ridge Manor in Kansas City, Missouri, for their pan-fried chicken; Round Rock Donuts in Round Rock, Texas, for donuts, including the behemoth "Texas Donut", a bucket-sized two-pound glazed donut; The Old Salty Dog in Sarasota, Florida, for the "Salty Dog", a beer-battered foot-long hot dog loaded with toppings; Restaurant Raices in Old San Juan, Puerto Rico for the "Chuleta Kan-Kan", a giant deep-fried pork chop surrounded by crispy pork rind; and finally, the California State Fair in Sacramento, California, for various deep-fried goodies on a stick, such as deep-fried catfish at Minnie's Cornbread House, the crispy potato-wrapped "Twister Dog" at Tornado Potato, and the super-sweet "King Twinkie", three frozen Twinkies deep-fried into one huge Twinkie and topped with powdered sugar and chocolate sauce, at Sweet Cheeks.
8	"Savory Seafood"	February 22, 2012
Adam samples seafood dishes from coast to coast. Stops featured: Lucha Libre Gourmet Taco Shop in San Diego, California, home to their "Surfin' California Burrito", packed with carne asada, shrimp, avocado and French fries; Deanie's in New Orleans, Louisiana, for some of their saucy & spicy "barbecue" shrimp; Hogfish Bar & Grill in Stock Island, Florida, for their "Killer Hogfish" sandwich topped with sautéed mushrooms, onions, and Swiss cheese; Reel Inn in Malibu, California, for their sautéed cracker-coated halibut; and finally, Skippers Smokehouse in Tampa, Florida, for a taste of smoked alligator ribs with a BBQ sauce called "Goo".
9	"BBQ Bliss"	February 29, 2012
Adam devours the best barbecue feasts. Stops featured: Charlie Vergos' Rendezvous in Memphis, Tennessee, for their dry-rub ribs; Pappy's Smokehouse in St. Louis, Missouri, for their 6-lb meat medley called the "Big Ben", which includes a full slab of pork ribs, a pulled pork sandwich, a beef brisket sandwich, and a 1/4 chicken, along with four sides; Henry's World Famous Hi-Life in San Jose, California, for their open-pit white oak smoked baby back ribs with secret BBQ sauce; Adam gets an invitation to the Osborne Family Farm in Little Rock, Arkansas, for an annual backyard barbecue that pays tribute to the local police and fire departments with a tray that features a 4-lb chicken, a massive beef rib, a slab of brisket, six spicy sausages, a piled-high pulled pork sandwich and an 8-inch turkey leg; Buz and Ned's Real Barbecue in Richmond, Virginia, for Buz's hickory and oak-smoked pork spare ribs; and finally The Brick Pit in Mobile, Alabama, for their pecan and hickory wood-smoked barbecued chicken dinner with slaw and baked beans (clip previously unseen).
10	"Sizzling Steaks"	March 14, 2012
Adam samples steaks at five steakhouses. Stops include: Cattlemen's Steakhouse in Oklahoma City for the George H. W. Bush-dubbed "Presidential T-Bone", a wet aged steak doused in savory beef au jus; The Silo Restaurant in Lewiston, New York, for the "Haystack", a one-pound sandwich combining sliced ribeye steak, melted mozzarella cheese, and deep fried hash browns; The Buckhorn Exchange in Denver, Colorado, for 14 meats including buffalo, ostrich, elk, and yak, as well as a 64-ounce slab of beef appropriately named "The Big Steak"; The Drover Restaurant & Lounge in Omaha, Nebraska, for their "Whiskey Steaks", including the whiskey-soaked "Omaha Strip", a New York strip with the bone left in; and finally, the Riverstone Grill in Grand Island, New York, for their "Bone in the Stone", a 3 1/2-pound bone-in ribeye steak smothered in a double dose of blue cheese (melted and crumbly) and crispy onion strings.
11	"Sensational Sausages"	March 21, 2012
Adam takes in sausages across America. Stops include: Schmidt's Sausage Haus in Columbus, Ohio, for their "Autobahn", an all-you-can-eat sausage buffet featuring delicacies such as the spicy "Bahama Mama" sausage, plus bratwurst, knackwurst, and sausage stew; Ben's Chili Bowl in Washington, D.C. for the "Chili Half-Smoke", a smoked beef-and-pork sausage in a bun topped with mustard, onions, and Ben's famous chili; Campi's in Rochester, New York, where Adam indulged in their "Sausage Bomber", an oversized sandwich packing in butterflied Italian sausage, sautéed onions, peppers and mushrooms, Mozzarella cheese, and heaps of red sauce (clip previously unseen); The Buff Restaurant in Boulder, Colorado, home to the "Saddlebags", bacon or link sausage cooked into huge pancakes and topped with basted eggs; Bruges Waffles & Frites in Salt Lake City, Utah, for the "Machine Gun", a Moroccan lamb sausage sandwich topped with crispy Belgian frites and slathered in Andalouse sauce; and finally, Hot Sauce Williams in Cleveland, Ohio, for Cleveland's signature sandwich: the "Polish Boy", a beefy kielbasa sandwich topped with creamy coleslaw, French fries, pulled pork shoulder, and tangy hot sauce.
12	"Spectacular Sandwiches"	March 28, 2012
Adam spotlights five of his favorite sandwiches. Stops include Katz's Delicatessen in New York City for the hand-sliced pastrami and corned beef in their one-pound Reuben sandwich; Primanti Brothers in Pittsburgh, Pennsylvania, for their stuffed sandwiches featuring hand-cut fries and their Italian-dressing coleslaw packed into each sandwich; Los Reyes de la Torta in Phoenix, Arizona, for the "Torta del Rey", a two-pound Mexican sandwich packing pork, beef, ham, hot dog and chorizo rolled into an omelette all on top of beans and a host of toppings into a Telera roll; The Black Sheep in Richmond, Virginia, for a peach chutney and jerk chicken-infused "battleship" (an oversized 2 1/2-pound submarine) called the "U.S.S. Brooklyn"; and finally, Ike's Place in San Francisco for their "Kryptonite" sandwich, a 4-pound, 13-ingredient creation which includes five meats, pepper jack cheese, two avocados, mozzarella sticks, onion rings and jalapeño poppers.
13	"Classic Comfort Food"	April 4, 2012
Adam explores the country to try comfort foods. Stops include: Sylvia's in Harlem, New York, for their pan-fried chicken; Lulu's Bakery in San Antonio, Texas, for their giant cinnamon rolls; Tom + Chee in Newport, Kentucky, to try their grilled blueberry-blue cheese donut sandwich; the Wafels & Dinges food truck in New York City to sample their BBQ pulled pork and cole slaw topped waffle; The Rack Shack in Burnsville, Minnesota, for the "Hobo", a smoked potato in a skillet topped with pulled pork, brisket, and a multitude of sides and sauces; and Hominy Grill in Charleston, South Carolina, for their signature shrimp and grits and the "Big Nasty", a fried chicken breast between two buttery biscuits smothered in sausage gravy.
