= Broken Yolk Cafe =

American restaurant chain

- Type: Private
- Industry: Foodservice
- Founded: 1979
- Headquarters: Pacific Beach, San Diego, California
- Number of locations: 42 (10 upcoming) (2026)
- Area served: Arizona; California; Idaho; Nevada; Texas
- Revenue: $110 million (2024)
- Owner: John Gelastopoulos
- Website: www.thebrokenyolkcafe.com

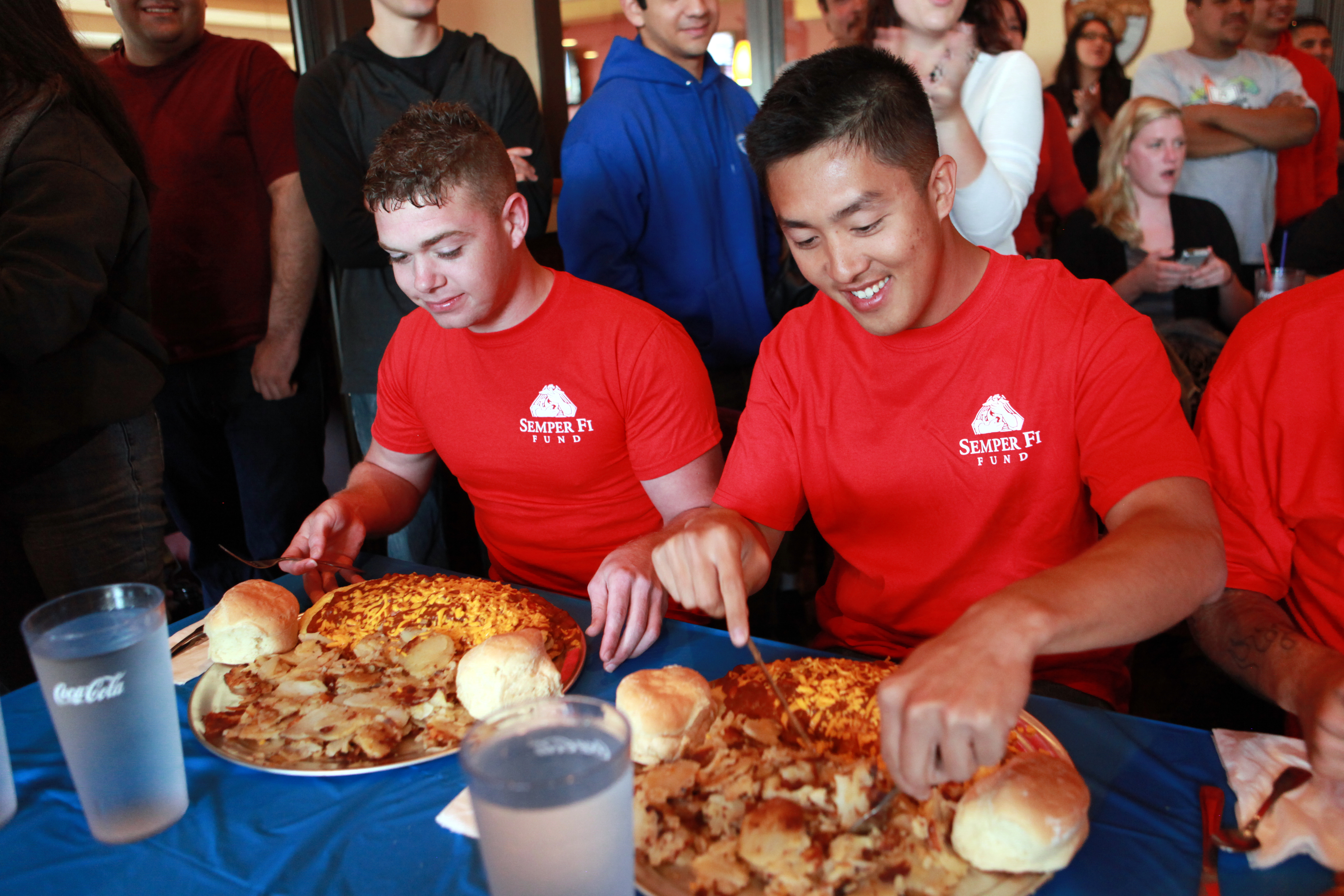
Members of the Combat Logistics Regiment 17 undertaking the BYC Challenge at the restaurant in 2012, raising funds for the Semper Fi & America's Fund

The Broken Yolk Cafe is an American restaurant chain serving American breakfast foods, mixed with Tex-Mex cuisine. Founded in 1979, it has 42 locations as of 2026, primarily based in Southern California, with additional restaurants situated throughout other areas of the Western United States. The restaurant operates for breakfast, brunch, and lunch, and is most known for its Eggs Benedict.

== History ==
The Broken Yolk Cafe was founded in 1979, in the Pacific Beach neighborhood of San Diego. John Gelastopoulos, a real estate restaurant broker, bought the restaurant in 1993.

The company began to franchise its locations in 2007. Adam Richman visited one of the chain's restaurants in 2009 as a part of the third season of Man v. Food. He was able to complete the restaurant's BYC Challenge. In 2015, the first location in Arizona was opened, in the city of Mesa. Fifteen locations were opened in Florida in 2016 in the chain's first foray into the East Coast. A Midwest location, in Illinois, was also opened in that year. The first Nevada location was in Las Vegas, opened in 2019. In 2020, the first restaurant in Idaho was opened, in Boise.

The chain offered the BYC Challenge. To win, participants had to finish a twelve-egg omelette stuffed with, mushrooms, onions, cheese, and chili in under an hour. Accompanying the omelette included a large servings of home fries and two biscuits. Those who completed the challenge would be placed on the Hall of Fame, receive a t-shirt, and not have to pay.

== Menu ==
Items served by the Broken Yolk Cafe include breakfast burritos, avocado toast, açaí bowls, parfaits, steel-cut oats, skillets, omelettes, Eggs Benedict, huevos rancheros, machaca, chilaquiles, pancakes, waffles, French toast, crêpes, burgers, a club sandwich, a BLT, melt sandwiches, salads, and the signature two eggs of any style with a choice of home fries, hash browns, fruit, Mexican rice, refried beans, black beans, and bread like biscuits, muffins, tortillas, and English muffin. Cocktails, juices, coffees, and beer are also offered.

== Locations ==
As of 2026, the Broken Yolk Cafe has 42 locations. Of those locations, 29 are in California and concentrated around the southern part of the state. The franchise currently has five locations in Arizona, five in Nevada, two in Texas, and one in Idaho.

== Awards ==
The Broken Yolk Cafe has received awards in the "Best Breakfast" category with The San Diego Union-Tribune, San Diego Reader, San Diego Magazine, and San Diego CityBeat.

The Broken Yolk Cafe franchise was named as the country's "Top Breakfast Franchise" in the 2025 Franchise Times Zor Awards. In that same year, Broken Yolk Cafe found itself on the "Nation's Restaurant News Top 500 Listing", ranking the largest restaurant chains in America. The brand was also listed in the 2025 Franchise Times Top 400, a listing of the 400 largest U.S.-based franchise systems.
