= Hominy Grill =

Restaurant in Charleston, South Carolina

Coordinates: 32.7888°N 79.9468°W

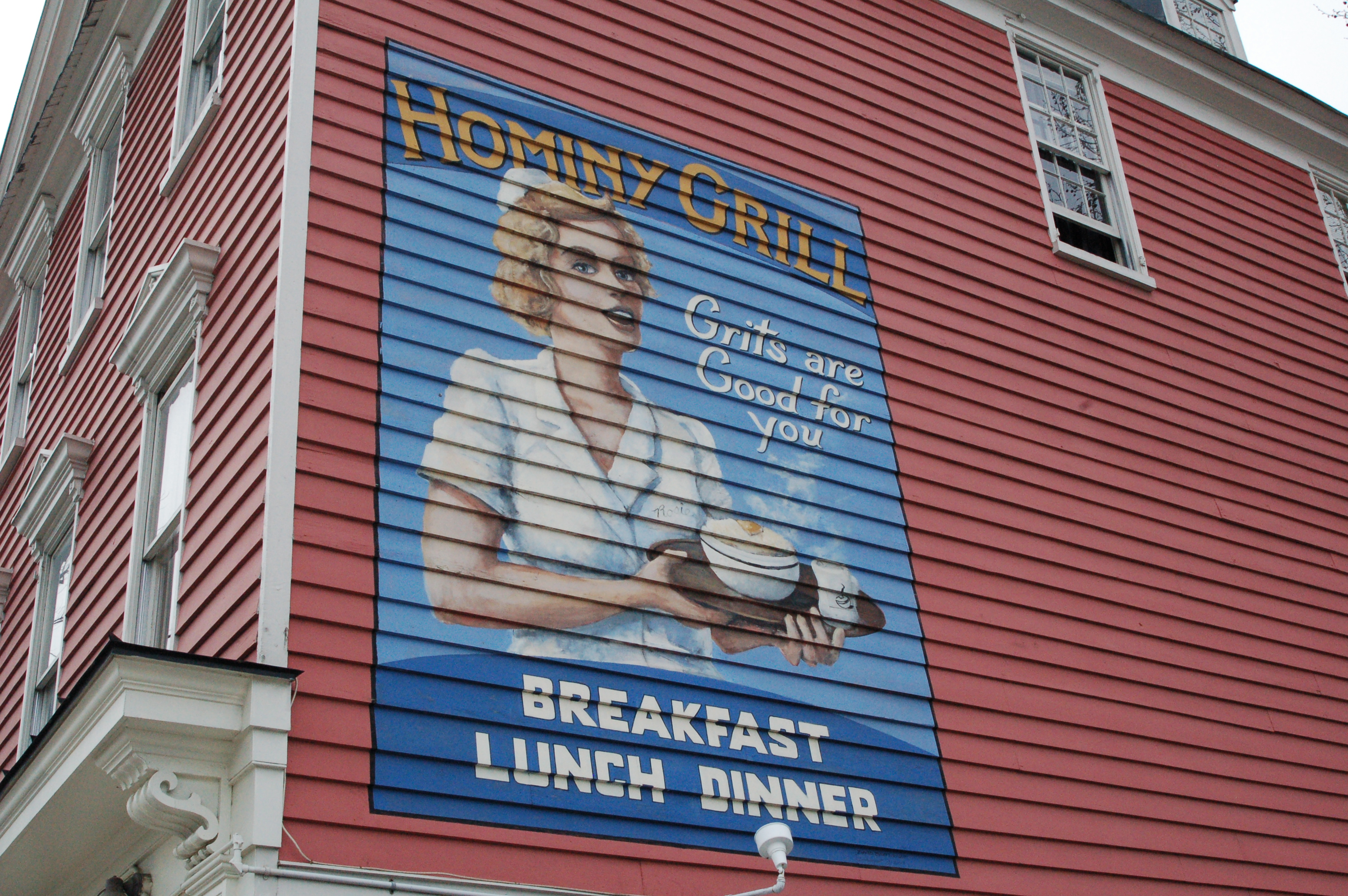
Side of the Hominy Grill restaurant in Charleston, South Carolina

Hominy Grill was a restaurant in Charleston, South Carolina. It was located at 207 Rutledge Avenue, in the heart of historic downtown Charleston. The restaurant has been delighting tourists and locals alike for almost 24 years. Chef Robert Stehling has been honored by the James Beard Foundation Award as the best chef in the Southeastern United States in 2008 and the restaurant has been featured on The Best Thing I Ever Ate (Chocolate Souffle), No Reservations with Anthony Bourdain, Amazing Eats (shrimp & grits and the "Big Nasty" (a fried chicken breast between two buttery biscuits smothered in sausage gravy) and Man v. Food (season 2) (shrimp & grits and the "Big Nasty"). The restaurant features amped-up Southern classics and Lowcountry cuisine with an elevated twist.

== History ==
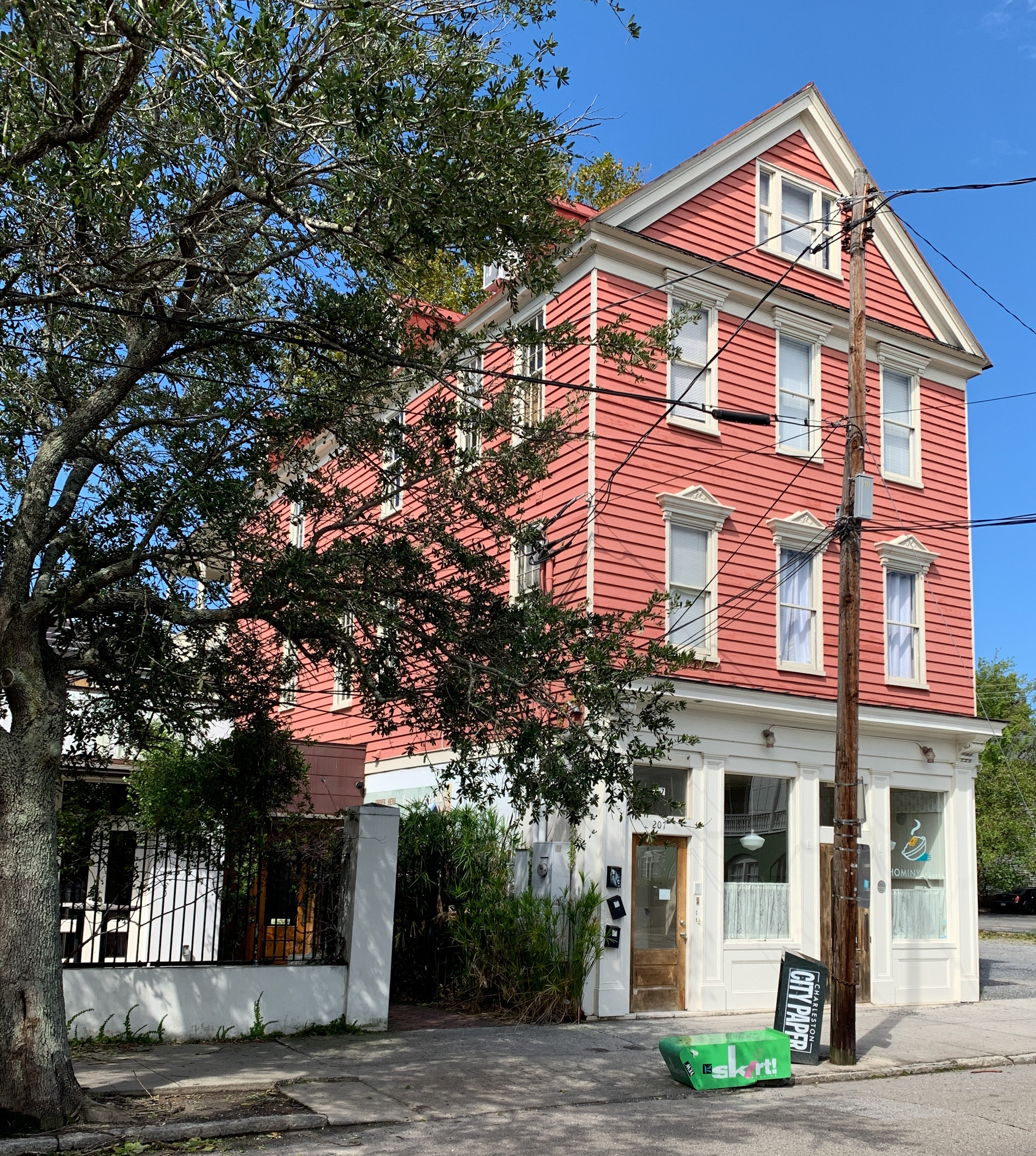
The building housing the Hominy Grill in September 2019.

In 1996, Chef Stehling and his wife, Nunally, opened the restaurant with the idea that they could attract a lunch crowd from the nearby Medical University of South Carolina. The building is a historic single house that was once a barbershop. Although they originally only served lunch, Stehling and Hominy Grill became famous for their breakfast. Soon after starting breakfast service, popular travel magazines and food blogs posted positive reviews about the breakfast offerings. As Hominy was one of the only restaurants in Charleston serving a hearty breakfast menu at the time, Stehling was set apart in travel guides and recommendations.

Soon Hominy began serving breakfast, lunch and dinner service. Chef Stehling combined his aptitude for innovation from his fine dining background, access to fresh and local ingredients and his customers' fondest food memories of growing up in the South to pioneer a new food scene in Charleston. This balance of nuance and fresh perspective, as well as respect for tradition, brought Southern cuisine to the forefront of the epicurean eye and made Charleston the up-and-coming, popular tourist destination that it is today.

== Cuisines ==
The cuisine at Hominy Grill takes traditional dishes that true Southerners know and love and approaches them from a unique perspective that does not stray too far from the comfort food that is so indicative of Southern cooking. Some dishes the restaurant is famous for include such South Carolina staples as shrimp & grits and she-crab soup, along with some classic fried green tomatoes. The respect for tradition and exploration of culture through food was always the goal, according to Stehling, and to many visitors the Holy City and Hominy Grill are synonymous with each other. The most popular dish on the menu, and perhaps in all of Charleston, is the infamous "Charleston Nasty Biscuit." Originally intended to be a temporary menu special, Chef Stehling hesitated to serve it because the dish centers around fried chicken, a Southern staple so cliché that he felt it was a recipe for comparison and criticism. The inspiration came from the owner's son of a nearby auto shop, where the chef spent his free time working on an old car that he owned. A favorite meal of this young man was a chicken biscuit from the Southern fast-food chain Hardee's, but he would ask for gravy to poured over the biscuit, to which the employees commented that the addition was "nasty." Thus, the namesake of the special that became a menu staple was born. As a joke, Stehling created his own version and put it on the menu and customers loved it so much that he could never take it off. His take is begins with a fluffy, homemade, golden biscuit that is topped with a crusty, juicy piece of fried chicken, cheddar cheese and then smothered in copious amounts of homemade gravy that incorporates Hominy's homemade pork sausage. The restaurants sells approximately 150 of these indulgent undertakings each day, with around 400 biscuits churned out to accompany that and other dishes on the menu.

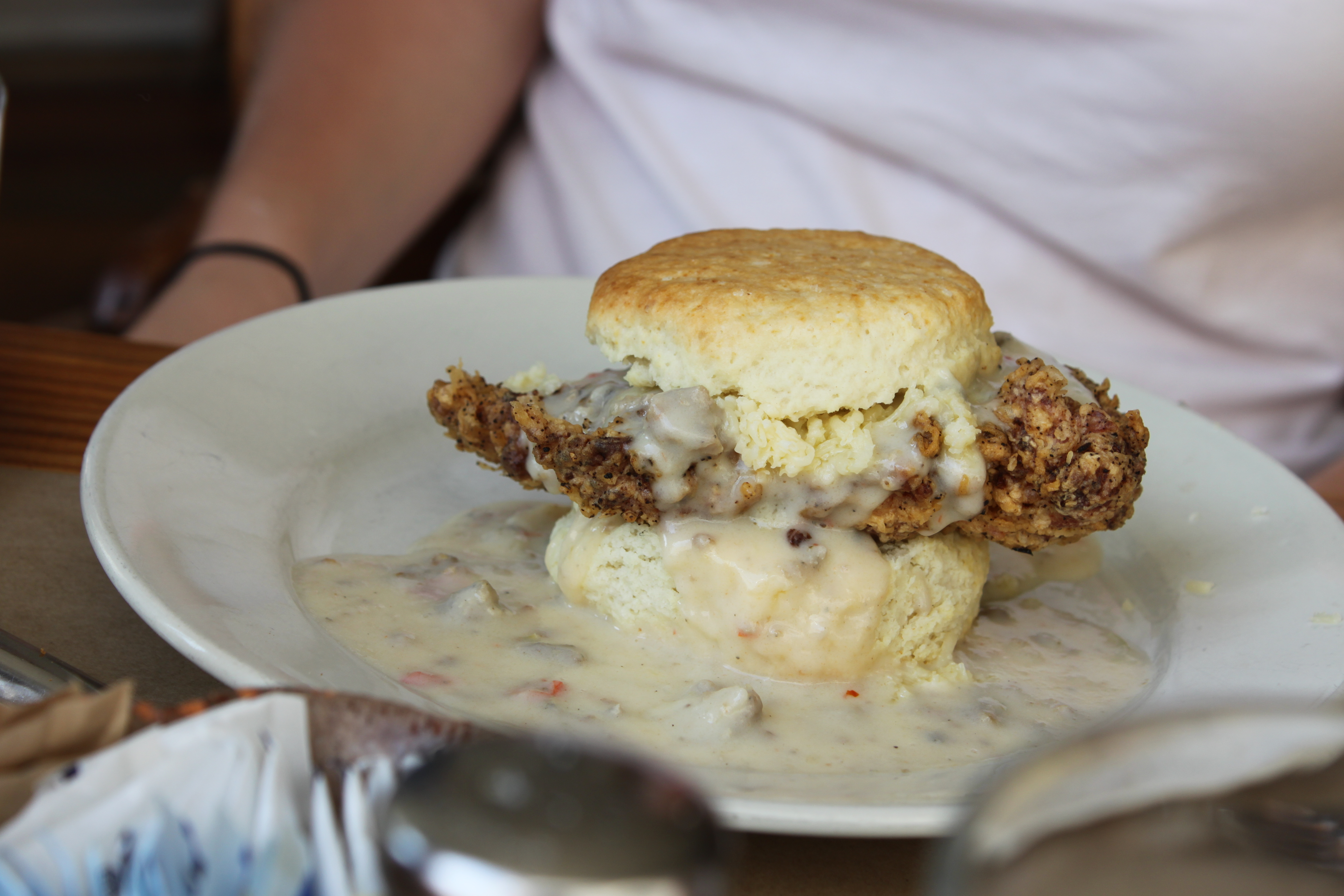
The "Big Nasty" from Hominy Grill, photographed in 2010.

Popular social media travel guides and food blogs such as Eater and Insider have paid a visit to Hominy Grill. Insider compiled a video interview with Chef Stehling himself, as well as footage of the mouthwatering "Charleston Nasty Biscuit."

On April 8, 2019, Hominy Grill announced via their Instagram account that they would be closing for good on April 28, just twenty days after the posting. Although there was speculation about trouble due to rent costs and employee scarcity, in subsequent interviews Stehling has commented that he is simply "ready for a break" and would like to be "open to new experiences." He also commented that he is looking forward to spending more time with his family and exploring new ventures in the coming months. When asked what the restaurants legacy ought to be, Stehling commented that the restaurant was opened as "an ideal - a blend of culture, food, and a welcoming setting where people would feel at home."

On April 28, 2019, the last day of service for Hominy Grill, the long lines of mourning fans gathered to wait over an hour to have one last meal from Chef Stehling's kitchen. Local fans who dined on that day, as well as tourists who have fond memories of their meals at the restaurant, paid tribute by posting photos with heartfelt captions on social media, mourning the loss on both Twitter and Instagram.

Food & Wine has gathered some of Stehling's best recipes for those who want to recreate the classic, comforting flavors of Hominy Grill at home. They have also compiled some archival photographs of everything from Stehling and the earliest days of the restaurant to more recent snapshots commemorating the atmosphere and the delicious cuisine.

The huge mural that is painted on the street-facing side of the restaurant's facade is an iconic view in the city. Showcasing a blonde-haired waitress in old-fashioned garb holding a steaming bowl of grits, the mural aptly bears the slogan "grits are good for you," in a style that emulates World War II era propaganda.

Many loyal customers are wondering what will become of it. According to Chef Stehling, who will remain owner of the property, deciding whether to leave it, paint over it or commission a new mural will lie with whoever takes over the lease. David Boatwright, a Charleston-based artist who painted the mural back in 2003, speculates that the new tenant will want something different in its place. Both agree that the commercial appeal is undeniable, but Boatwright hopes that the original mural will be uncovered years from now.
