= Melt Bar and Grilled =

American restaurant chain

- Type: Private
- Industry: Hospitality
- Founded: September 2006; 19 years ago in Lakewood, Ohio
- Founder: Matt Fish
- Defunct: January 1, 2025; 18 months ago
- Fate: Bankruptcy
- Headquarters: Cleveland, Ohio, United States
- Key people: Matt Fish (CEO)
- Owner: Matt Fish

Melt Bar and Grilled was a restaurant chain in Ohio that specialized in gourmet grilled cheese sandwiches and other comfort foods. The restaurant was founded in 2006 in Lakewood, Ohio by Matt Fish, who owned and operated the restaurants as the chief executive officer.

Melt received media attention both locally and nationally. Matt Fish's creations and the restaurant were featured in USA Today, Esquire Magazine, as one of the best sandwiches in America; and in National Culinary Review.

In June 2024, Melt Bar and Grilled filed for Chapter 11 bankruptcy protection, blaming growing economic issues and store closures as part of the decision. The company also faces several lawsuits for unpaid rent at its restaurants. The company claimed it would continue to operate during the proceedings. However, the last location closed by January 1, 2025.

== Former locations ==
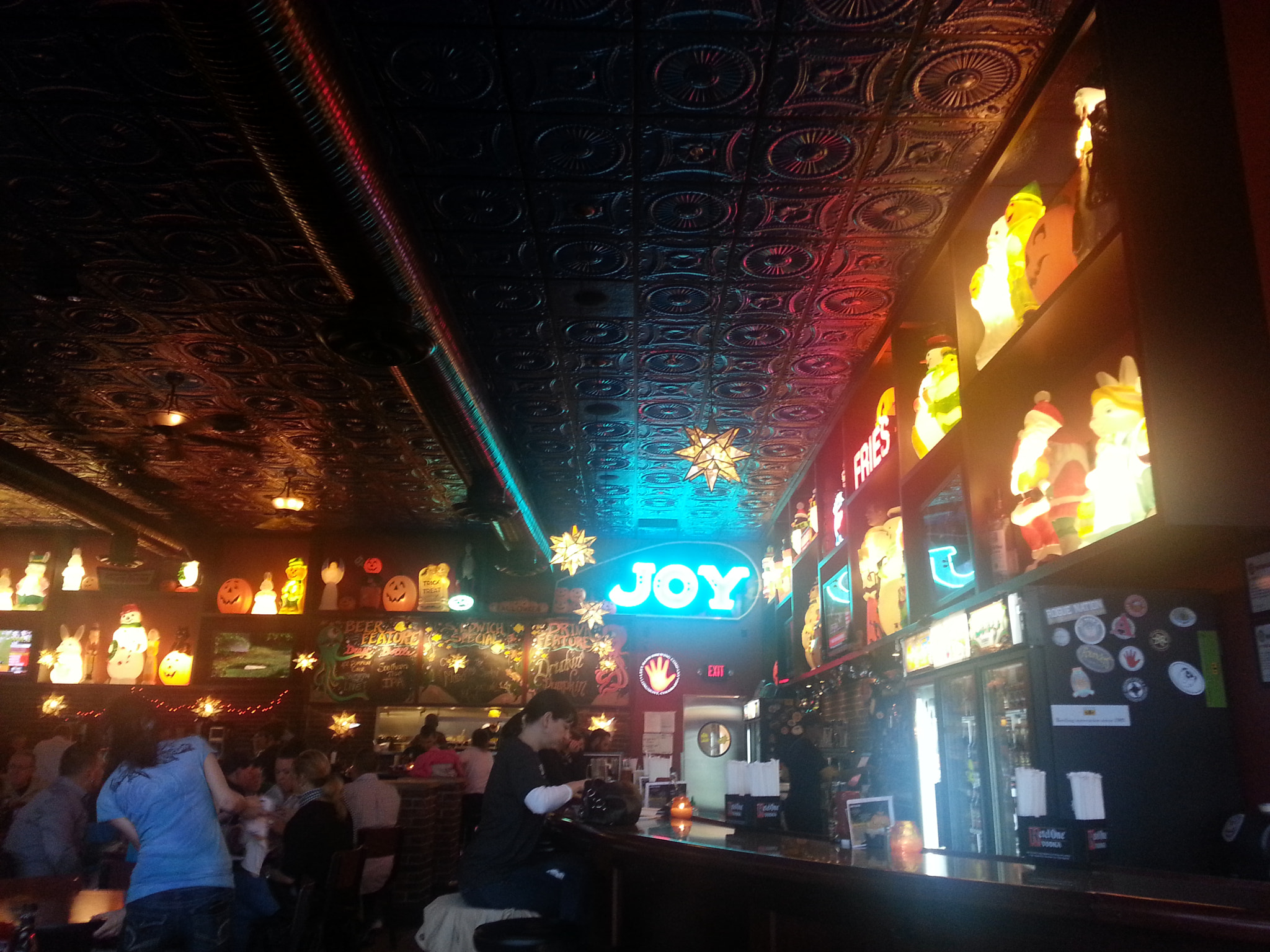
The interior of the former location in Independence, Ohio

- Cleveland Heights, opened in May 2010, closed in November 2020, at 13463 Cedar Road.
- Melt Public Square, opened in September 2016, at Café 200 Public Square.
- Columbus (Short North), opened in November 2013, closed in July 2022, at 840 North High Street.
- Dayton, opened in June 2017, Closed in January 2023, at 2733 Fairfield Commons.
- Canton, opened in November 2017, Closed in January 2023, at 4230 Belden Village Mall Circle.
- Independence, opened in October 2011, closed in February 2024, at 6700 Rockside Road.
- Avon, opened in August 2017, closed in January 2024, at 35546 Detroit Road.
- Cedar Point, opened in May 2017, at 1 Cedar Point Drive, closed in May 2024.
- Columbus (Easton), opened in December 2014, at 4206 Worth Avenue, closed in July 2024.
- Mentor, opened in November 2012, at 7289 Mentor Avenue, closed August 11, 2024.
- Akron, opened in June 2016, at 3921 Medina Road, closed August 25, 2024.
- Lakewood, opened in September 2006, at 14718 Detroit Avenue, closed January 1, 2025.

== Television appearances ==
Melt was featured on several food-themed television shows. Food Network's Diners, Drive-Ins and Dives, with Guy Fieri, featured the original location in an episode that aired on February 8, 2010.

The Travel Channel show Man v. Food with Adam Richman also featured the original location in an episode that aired June 22, 2010.

In 2011, Melt was featured on the Food Network show The Best Thing I Ever Ate, in the messy food themed episode for their "Godfather" lasagna grilled cheese sandwich.

In 2012, Melt was featured in a cheese-themed episode of the Travel Channel's Amazing Eats, another Adam Richman-hosted show.

In 2013, Melt was featured in Cheese Paradise on the Travel Channel.
