= I'm with Stupid =

I'm with Stupid is a jovial insult, best known as a popular slogan for novelty T-shirts. It may also refer to:

- I'm with Stupid (TV series)
- I'm with Stupid (album), by Aimee Mann
- "I'm with Stupid" (Pet Shop Boys song)
- "I'm with Stupid" (Static-X song)
- I'm with Stupid, a book co-written by Gina Barreca and Gene Weingarten
- "I'm with Stupid" (SpongeBob SquarePants)
- "I'm with Stupid", a song by British rock band Chumbawamba on their album WYSIWYG
