= Cattlemen's Steakhouse =

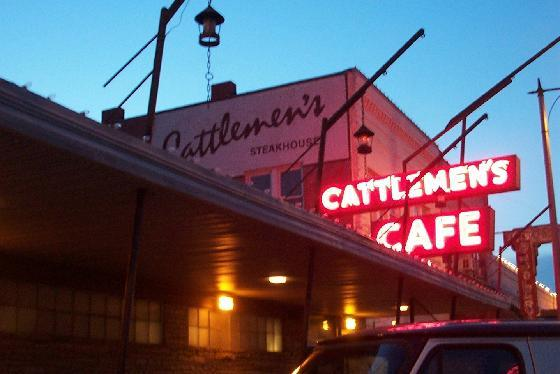
- Exterior view
- Interactive map of Cattlemen's Steakhouse

Restaurant information
- Established: 1910; 116 years ago
- Owner: Dick Stubbs
- Previous owner: Gene Wade
- Food type: Steak
- Dress code: Casual
- Location: 1309 S Agnew Ave, Oklahoma City, OK, 73108
- Coordinates: 35.4523839°N 97.5548525°W
- Website: cattlemensrestaurant.com

Cattlemen's Steakhouse is a steakhouse located in Oklahoma City. It is located in historic Stockyards City which has a western atmosphere. It is the oldest running restaurant in Oklahoma.

== History ==
The restaurant was established as Cattlemen's Cafe in 1910. At that time, it fed cowboys and ranchers in the Stockyards City area. Stockyards City was a major meat processing area and that location exported meat to the Eastern United States. In 1926, H.V. “Homer” Paul took ownership of the restaurant. During Prohibition, it served home-brewed "liquid delights". In 1929, Henry “Hank” Frey took ownership. His family also worked at the restaurant, his wife Gertrade as a waitress and his brother and brother-in-law as waiters. During Christmas Eve of 1945 at the Biltmore Hotel, Hank Frey lost it in a craps game to Gene Wade. Wade and his father renovated the restaurant and made it open 24 hours. Since then, it has returned to regular hours. In the early to mid 1950s, it became Cattleman's Drive-In, but by 1957, it became Cattlemen's Steakhouse. In 1990, Dick Stubbs bought the restaurant from the Wade family.

== Building ==
The original building appears like a diner and has two counters and red vinyl booths. There is a steakhouse side with two dining rooms called The Hereford and The Angus. The interior maintains a similar appearance since 1945. The interior is decorated with cowboy art. Some believe that the building is haunted.

== Menu ==
The steaks are naturally-aged and charcoal-broiled and from Midwest-raised, corn-fed cattle. The grade is either USDA Prime or Choice Grades.

For breakfast, the restaurant serves steak and eggs and offers calf brain and eggs.

The restaurant is also known for its lamb fries which are made from fried lamb testicles and is one of its best-selling appetizers. As of 2023, the restaurant purchases 25,000 to 30,000 pounds per year.

The restaurant also serves steak soup featuring bull penis, and pie.

== Recognition ==
Cattlemen's Steakhouse has won numerous awards. It also was inducted in the United States Steakhouse Hall of Fame.

Bon Appétit, Gourmet, and Southern Living have mentioned Cattlemen's Steakhouse as one of the best steakhouses in the country. The Food Network listed it as one of the top 50 steakhouses categorized by best in each state.

Cattlemen's Steakhouse has been featured in Man v. Food and Diners, Drive-Ins and Dives.

Multiple celebrities such as John Wayne, Reba McEntire, Toby Keith, and Ronald Reagan have visited the restaurant. Other celebrities like Sylvester Stallone, Shaquille O'Neal, and Charles Barkley also have dined at the restaurant. George H. W. Bush also ate at the restaurant.
