= Lucha Libre Taco Shop =

Restaurant in California

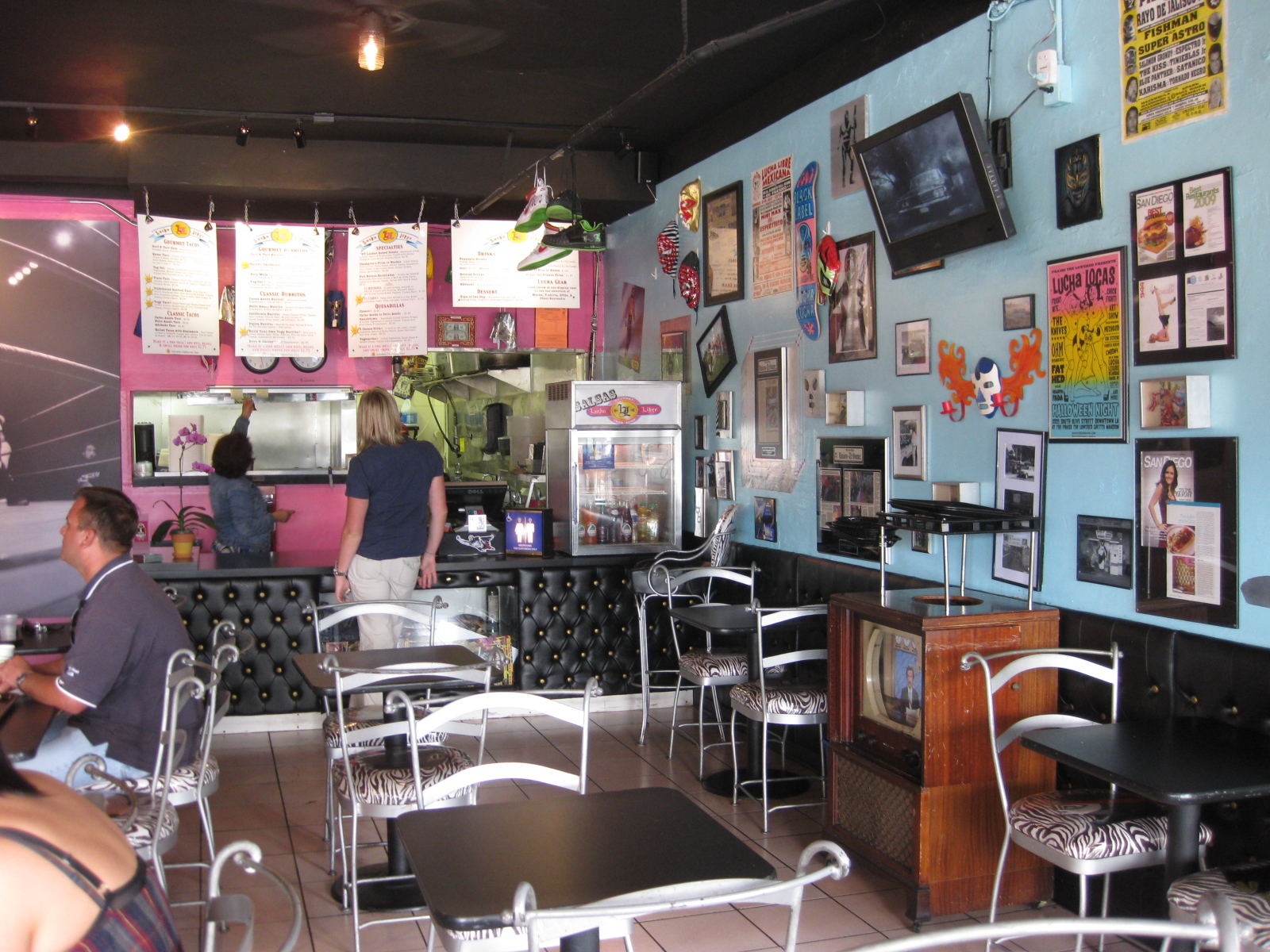
- Interior of the original restaurant, 2009

- Location within San Diego Lucha Libre Taco Shop (California) Lucha Libre Taco Shop (the United States)

Restaurant information
- Established: 2008
- Owner: Jose Luis Rojano-Garcia
- Location: 1810 W Washington St, San Diego, CA 92103
- Coordinates: 32.7433°N 117.1816°W
- Website: www.luchalibretacoshop.com

Lucha Libre Taco Shop is a fast casual Mexican restaurant in the Mission Hills neighborhood of San Diego, California. Founded in 2008 and known for its elaborate and colorful interior design, it also has locations in North Park and Pacific Beach.

== History ==
The restaurant was first opened in 2008 by brothers Jose Luis, Maurilio, and Diego Rojano-Garcia as a side project. They grew up watching professional wrestling and thought that the culture around it fit how they envisioned the menu and interior design of the restaurant. It opened its second location in the North Park in 2015. They had previously opened an outpost in Petco Park in 2014.

== Menu ==
The restaurant serves many types of tacos, including queso, ado-haba (adobada and habanero), seafood (mahi-mahi or shrimp), classic, rolled, surf & turf, and birria quesa. Burritos include seafood, surf & turf, classic veggie, classic, poblano, surfin', and pluckin'. Sides offered are corn, rice, refried beans, and black beans. Quesadillas are also sold.

== Interior design ==
Most of the restaurant's walls are painted hot pink and display many souvenirs and memorabilia from Mexican wrestling. The roof contains masks and disco balls, and the restroom is completely gold. The restaurant also contains a "Champion's Booth", which is a gold booth that can only be reserved a day before. The brothers wanted to incorporate their culture different way than other Mexican restaurants. The trash bin is made from an old television set. Ron Burgundy, played by Will Ferrell, from the Anchorman: The Legend of Ron Burgundy has his face on the set. Wrestlers eat at the restaurant for free and customers can get a 15% discount if they wear a wrestling mask. Because of this, many professional wrestlers visit.
