= Manicotti =

Type of tube pasta

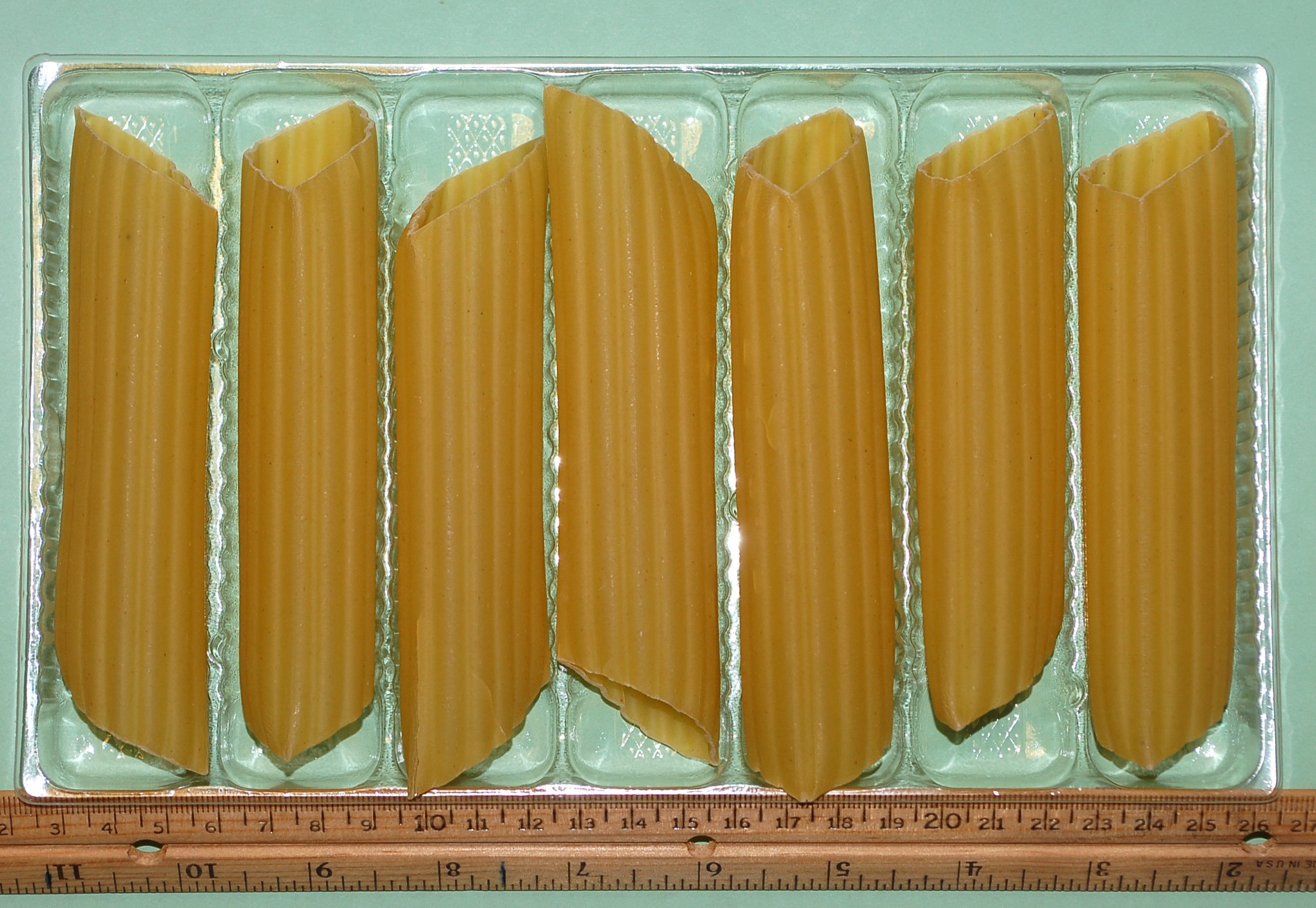
Manicotti with ruler

Manicotti (the plural form of the Italian word manicotto; < manica, 'sleeve', + the augmentative ending, -otto) are a type of pasta in Italian and Italian-American cuisine. They are large pasta tubes intended to be stuffed and baked.

The filling is generally ricotta cheese mixed with chopped parsley, and possibly ground meat such as veal. They are served topped with tomato sauce.

Another traditional variation of manicotti that has been popular among older generations of Italian-Americans uses crespelle (Italian crêpes) instead of the dried pasta tubes, which have become more common in modern Italian-American cuisine.

== See also ==
- List of pasta
