= Crown Burgers =

Restaurant chain based in Salt Lake City, Utah, U.S.

- Industry: Restaurants
- Founded: 1978; 48 years ago
- Founder: Nick Katsanevas; John Katzourakis
- Headquarters: Salt Lake City, Utah, U.S.
- Number of locations: 7 (2023)
- Area served: Utah

Crown Burgers is a small hamburger fast food restaurant chain based in Salt Lake City, Utah started in 1978 by Nick Katsanevas and John Katzourakis. As of 2023, they have seven locations, all in Utah.

== History ==
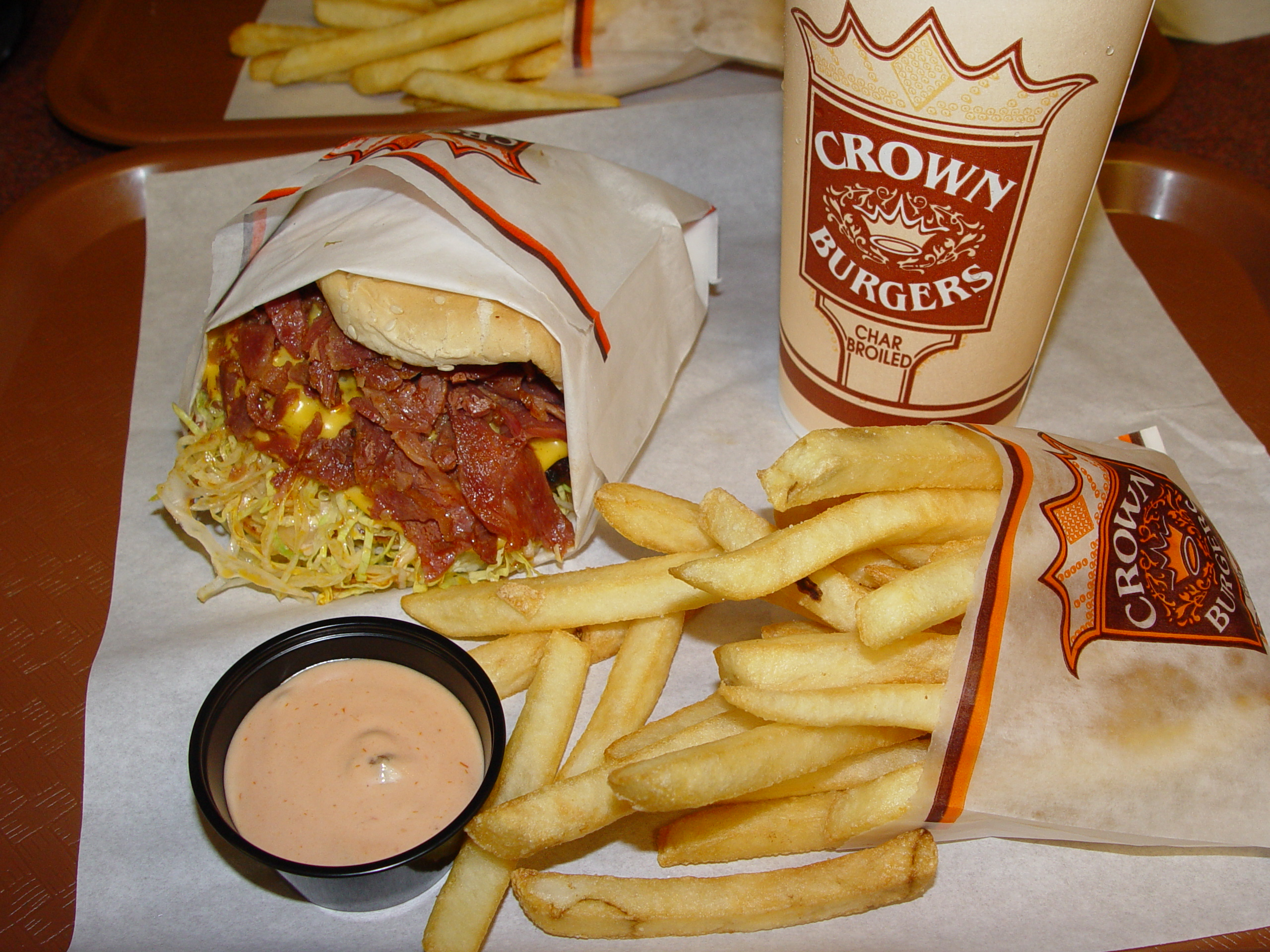
A combo meal with the classic Crown Burger

The Utah chain has a history rooted in Greek immigration and a commitment to community. The Katsanevas and Katzourakis family opened Crown Burgers in 1978 after experiencing job loss in California. The menu reflects the diversity seen in Greek immigrant food carts, offering burgers, burritos, souvlaki, fish and chips, and Greek gyros. Crown Burgers also carries its own version of the regional condiment fry sauce, a combination of ketchup, mayonnaise and spices.

Dean Maroudas, who now manages Crown Burgers, highlights the importance of community and customer preferences. Crown Burgers' success and expansion across Utah are attributed to this community-oriented approach, contrasting a global conquest mindset.

=== Pastrami burger ===
The Pastrami burger, a cheeseburger which also includes hot pastrami, was first served at Minos Burgers in Anaheim, California by James Katsanevas, a relative of the Katzourakises. Katsanevas originally learned to make pastrami burgers from a Los Angeles man of Turkish descent. When the Katsanevases and Katzourakises opened the first Crown Burgers in Utah, they added Katsanevas's pastrami burger to the menu, and it became their signature burger, the "Crown Burger". Crown Burgers' pastrami burger has become a staple of restaurant cuisine in Salt Lake City, with a variety of local restaurants offering the sandwich, as well as the international chain Carl’s Jr. The Katsanevases would later open the second Crown Burgers location in Utah.

== Reception ==
In 2010, Crown Burgers was named as serving The Official Best Burgers of Utah in 2011 in an episode of Travel Channel's Man v. Food.

Crown Burgers is such a fixture in the Salt Lake Valley that in the London production of The Book of Mormon musical, the Crown Burgers logo can be seen on the backdrop for Salt Lake City stage scenes.

== Gallery ==
Crown Burgers
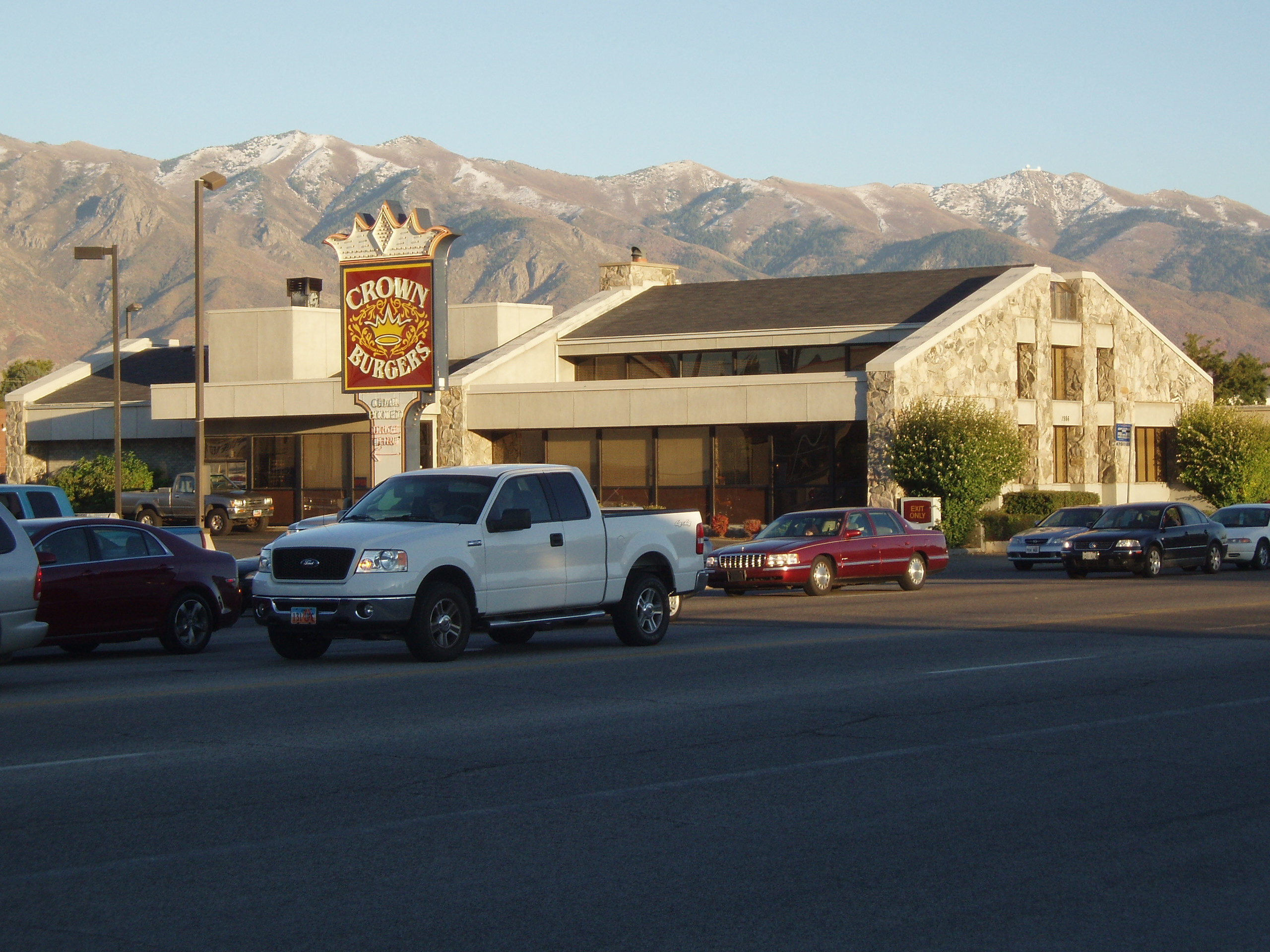
Crown Burgers in Layton, 2008

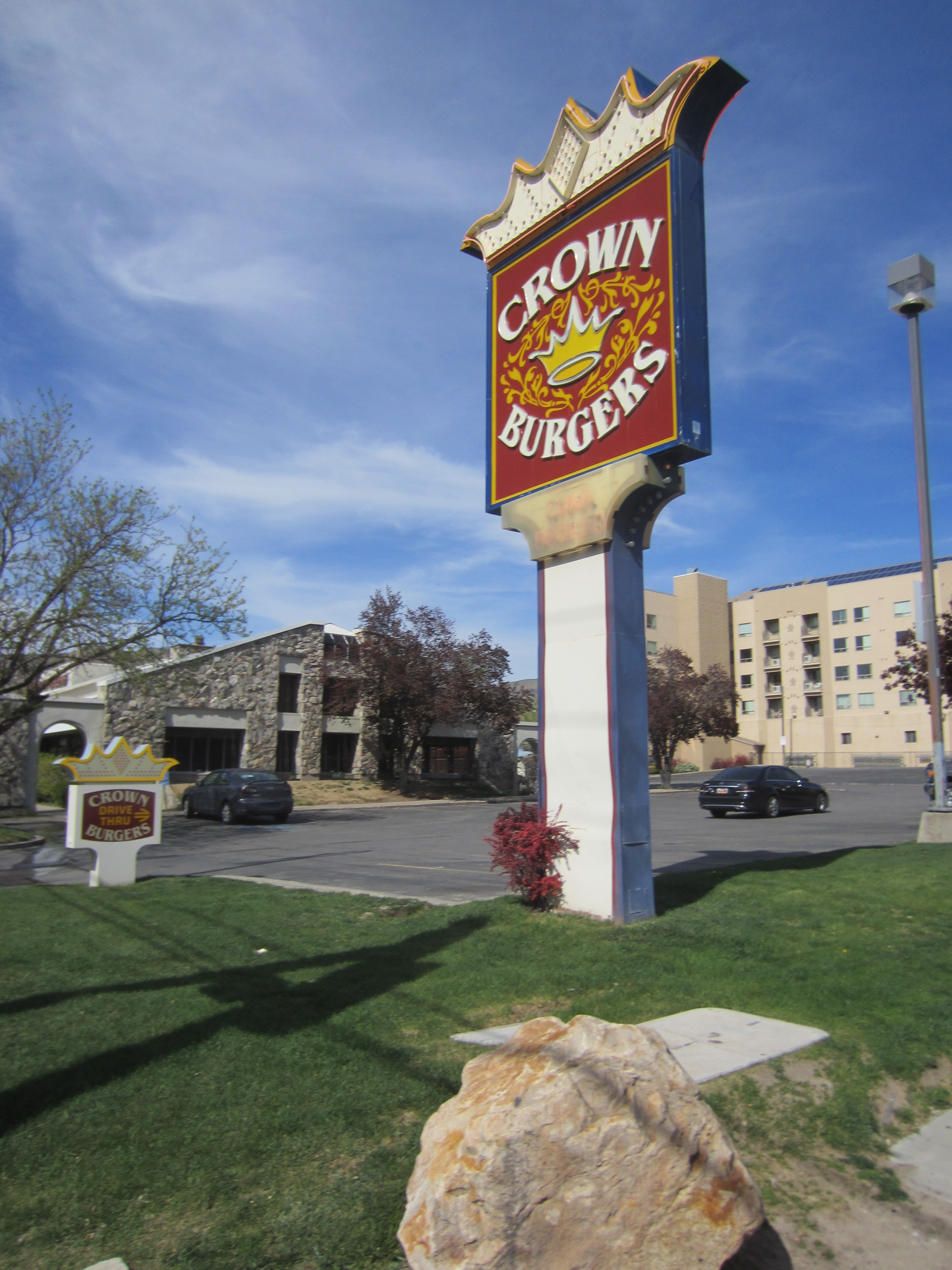
Crown Burgers in Salt Lake City, 2021

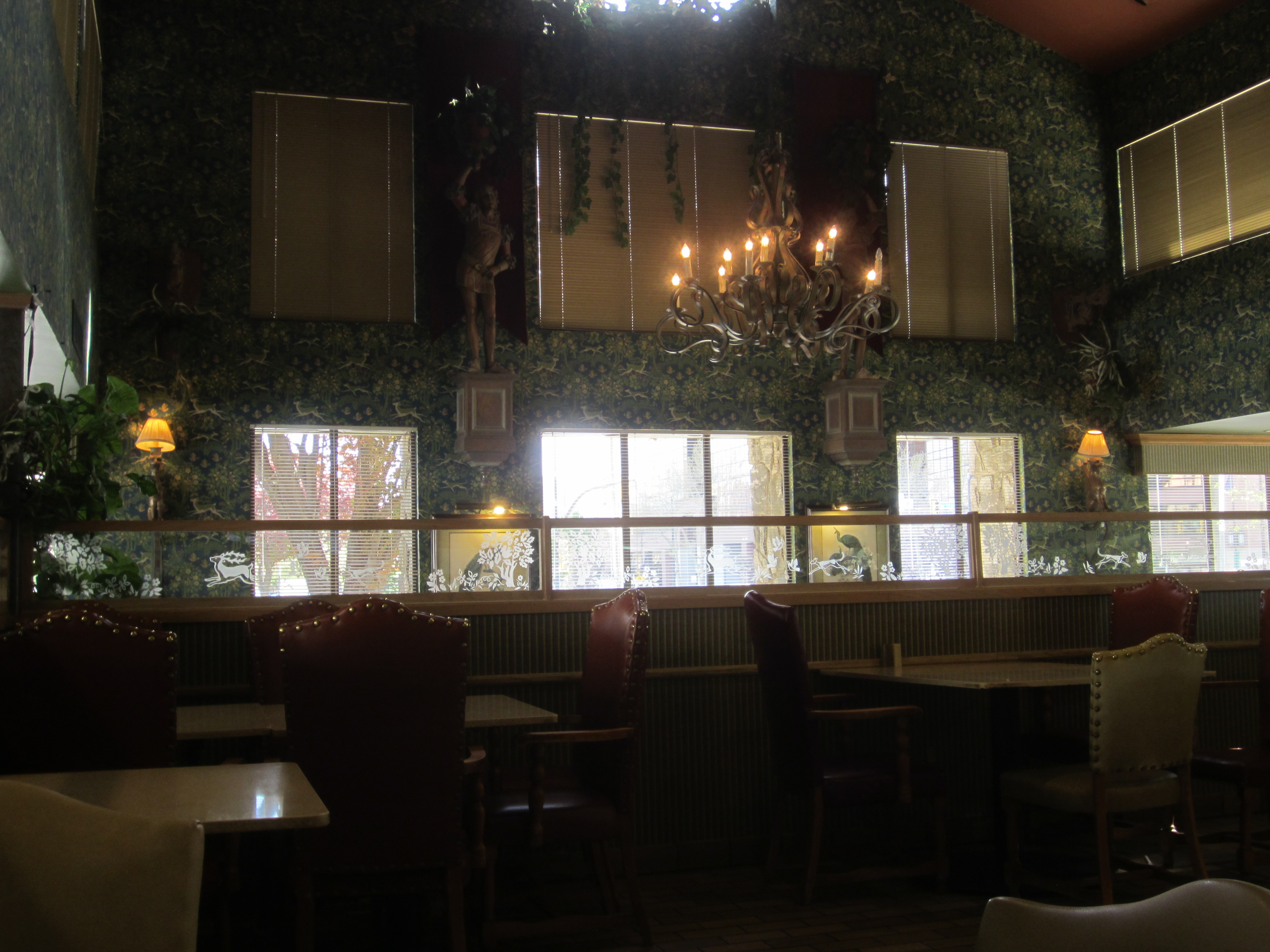
Inside Crown Burgers Salt Lake City, 2021

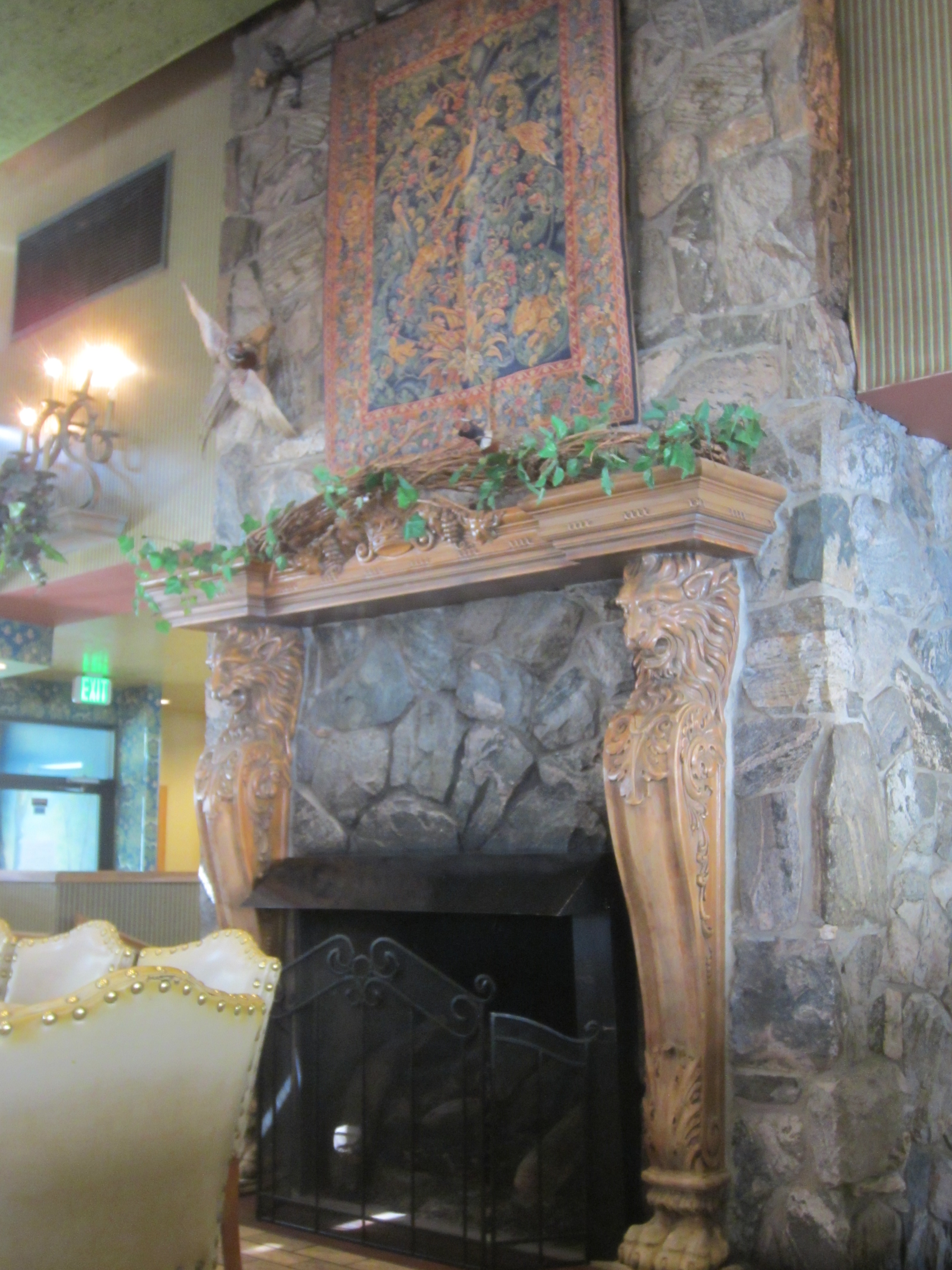
Inside Crown Burgers Salt Lake City, 2021

== See also ==
- List of hamburger restaurants
