= Chowdown Countdown =

- Written by: Jeff Rotter, Mike Trainor
- Starring: Mason Pettit (narrator)
- Theme music composer: Ben Zebelman (Octave Music)
- Composer: Pump Audio
- Country of origin: United States
- Original language: English

Production
- Executive producers: Matt Sharp, Dan Adler
- Editors: Sherman Lau, Dan Lerner, Jennifer Padham, Barney J. Schmidt, Dave Soloman
- Running time: 60 minutes
- Production company: Sharp Entertainment

Original release
- Network: Travel Channel
- Release: January 3 – January 31, 2010

Chowdown Countdown is an American television special series that features 101 places to find the tastiest and most amazing food at various locations across America. Each episode counts down to the number one spot and features all different types of establishments such as restaurants, diners, drive-ins, bars, burger joints, bakeries, drivethrus, delicatessens, ice cream parlors, pubs, sandwich shops, food markets and even food trucks that make the countdown list with their original food specialty or signature dish.

The series premiered as a special in Spring 2010 entitled 101 America's Tastiest Places to Chowdown on the Travel Channel. The second special aired in on March 16, 2014 as 101 More Amazing Places to Chowdown (or Chowdown Countdown 2).

== America's 101 Tastiest Places to Chowdown (2010) ==
=== Episode 1: #101-81 ===
Rank #	Restaurant	Location	Specialty(s)
101	Abe's Bar-B-Q	Clarksdale, Mississippi	Pulled pork sandwich (grilled and pulled Boston pork butt smothered in secret barbecue sauce topped with coleslaw)
100	Denny's Beer Pub	Clearfield, Pennsylvania	Home of the 50-pound cheeseburger (and burger challenges)
99	Buckhorn Exchange	Denver, Colorado	State-game steaks (buffalo, ostrich, rattlesnake and alligator); "Rocky Mountain oysters" (deep-fried bull testicles)
98	Bassett's Ice Cream at Reading Terminal	Philadelphia, Pennsylvania	148 years making high butterfat (16 1/2%) ice cream. Signature flavor: Mint Chocolate Chip.
97	Five Islands Lobster Co.	Georgetown, Maine	Freshest steamed Maine lobsters (half-pound to 4 1/2-pound "Big Boy")
96	Philippe's The Original	Los Angeles County, California	French dip sandwiches (sliced beef, lamb, pork or turkey on French bread dipped in au jus topped with Creole mustard)
95	Time-Out Chicken	Chapel Hill, North Carolina	"Chicken Cheddar Biscuit" (fried chicken breast topped with melted cheddar cheese between two buttermilk biscuits)
94	Gaucho's Village	Glendale, California	Brazilian Steakhouse (Rodízio) all-you-can-eat different kinds of meat on skewers.
93	Jimmy Buff's	East Hanover, New Jersey	Italian-style hotdogs (fried hotdogs with onions, peppers and fried potatoes stuffed in a hard roll)
92	Smitty's Market	Lockhart, Texas	Traditional Texas-style barbecue. Signature dishes: beef brisket and hot sausage links wrapped and served in market paper.
91	Black's Barbecue	Lockhart, Texas	Texas barbecue featuring secret spiced beef brisket and pork sausage links.
90	The Vortex Bar & Grill	Atlanta, Georgia	Cheeseburger with three fried eggs and bacon between two grilled cheese sandwiches.
89	Doughnut Plant	New York City, New York	Gourmet doughnuts featuring glazed with rose petals or fruit glazed doughnuts.
88	Giordano's	Chicago, Illinois	Home of the "Stuffed Pizza". Various stuffed crust pizza pies.
87	Hominy Grill	Charleston, South Carolina	"Low Country Cuisine". Shrimp and grits, "Big Nasty Sandwich" (fried chicken breast topped with cheese and sausage gravy on a buttermilk biscuit)
86	Cattleman's Steakhouse	Fabens, Texas	Home of the four-pound T-Bone steak.
85	Daichan Kaiten Sushi	Los Angeles County, California	Conveyor belt sushi specializing in "White Candy Rolls".
84	Cafe Fleuri @ The Langham Hotel Boston	Boston, Massachusetts	Home of the Chocolate Bar Buffet (September through June).
83	Schmidt's Sausage Haus	Columbus, Ohio	Bratwurst buffet called "The Autobahn" featuring "Bahama Mama" pork sausage. Signature dessert: giant cream puffs.
82	Willie Mae's Scotch House	New Orleans, Louisiana	Home to the world-famous fried chicken.
81	Nick Tahou Hots	Rochester, New York	Home to the "Garbage Plate" (1 1/2-pound plate: Two cheeseburger patties, macaroni salad and home fries topped with mustard, onions, beans and hot sauce)

=== Episode 2: #80-61 ===
Rank #	Restaurant	Location	Specialty(s)
80	The Brick Pit	Mobile, Alabama	"Serious Bar-B-Que" (pecan and hickory wood smoked), slow-smoked pulled pork barbecue, pulled pork sandwich, pork ribs and pork butts.
79	The Cherry Cricket	Denver, Colorado	Custom-built burgers, 21 toppings. "Cricket Burger" (topped with cream cheese and jalapeños)
78	Kopp's Custard	Milwaukee, Wisconsin	Frozen custard, 300 flavors and "flavor of the day".
77	Lynn's Paradise	Louisville, Kentucky	Gourmet Breakfast: "Papaw French Toast" (pawpaw pure over breeduis bread topped with coconut ice cream and drizzled with caramel bourbon glaze)
76	The Olde San Francisco Creamery Co.	Walnut Creek, California	"The Kitchen Sink" (8 scoops of your choice of ice cream, 8 toppings, whipped cream, bananas, and cherries in a kitchen sink-shaped bowl)
75	The Buffet @ The Bellagio	Las Vegas, Nevada	200 stations of international food selections. Signature dishes: Kobe beef and crab legs.
74	Original New York System	Providence, Rhode Island	Home of "hot weiners" (topped with chili sauce, mustard and onions)
73	Frank Pepe Pizzeria Napoletana vs. Sally's Apizza	New Haven, Connecticut	Both home to coal-fired brick-oven Neapolitan pizza.
72	GCS Ballpark	Sauget, Illinois	Home of the Gateway Grizzly's minor league baseball team and the "Krispy Kreme Burger" (hamburger patty topped with 2 strips of bacon, cheese between two glazed Krispy Kreme donuts)
71	The Grill House	Allegan, Michigan	"Grill-Your-Own-Steaks" (prime rib, porter house, and bacon-wrapped filet minon)
70	El Guero Canelo	Tucson, Arizona	Home to "Sonoran Hot Dogs" (bacon-wrapped hot dogs topped with beans, onions, tomatoes, jalapeño sauce, mustard and mayo)
69	The Cozy Inn Hamburgers	Salina, Kansas	Old-fashioned sliders cooked with onions, topped with pickles, mustard and ketchup.
68	Iguana's Taqueria	San Jose, California	"Burrito Zilla" (5-pound, 18-inch monstrous super burrito filled with ground beef, rice, beans, cheese and sour cream)
67	Talkeetna's Roadhouse	Talkeetna, Alaska	"Rudy in a Parka" (reindeer sausage link stuffed with two cheeses in potato dough)
66	Yoder's Restaurant	Sarasota, Florida	Amish family-style home cooking. 23 different kinds of homemade pies (pecan, apple, cherry and shoefly pie)
65	Camp Washington Chili	Cincinnati, Ohio	Home of the "Five-Way Chili" (signature chili served over spaghetti topped with kidney beans, onions, and a mound of shredded cheese)
64	Round Rock Donuts	Round Rock, Texas	Home of the "Texas Donut" (2-pound, 14-inch glazed dough donut)
63	Chap's Charcoal Restaurant	Baltimore, Maryland	Home of "Pit Beef". Famous pit beef sandwich with "Tiger Sauce" (horseradish and mayo sauce).
62	Goodson's Cafe	Tomball, Texas	Signature dish: Chicken Fried Steak with peppered cream gravy.
61	Dinosaur Bar-B-Que	Syracuse, New York	Barbecue smoked pork, beef, chicken, ribs, brisket and wings.

=== Episode 3 #60-41 ===
Rank #	Restaurant	Location	Specialty(s)
60	Sylvia's Restaurant	Harlem, New York	The Queen of Soul Food. Signature dishes: spicy barbecue ribs and fried chicken.
59	Munchie's 420 Cafe	Sarasota, Florida	Home of the "Fat Sammies" (fan favorites: "Fat Dickie", "Fat Morning"). Signature sammy: "Fat Daddy" - sammy with melt cheese, 6 burger patties, 3 cheese steaks with mushrooms, onions and peppers, 22 slices of cheese, 6 chicken fingers, 6 mozzarella sticks, 6 onion rings and fries stuffed in a 2-foot long roll
58	Taqueria La Cumbre	San Francisco, California	Home of the "Mission-style Burritos" (burrito stuffed with 2-pounds of fillings)
57	Chick and Ruth's Delly	Annapolis, Maryland	Home of 6-pound milkshakes.
56	Big Mama's Kitchen	Omaha, Nebraska	Oven-fried chicken served with cornbread salad and sweet potato bread.
55	Jim Neely's Interstate Bar-B-Que	Memphis, Tennessee	Sauced barbecue pork ribs and barbecue spaghetti.
54	Steak & Main	North East, Maryland	Home of the "Great Steak Challenge" ($140 worth of food - 5 cuts of beef: two 13-ounce Delmonico club steak, one 5-ounce strip steak, one 8-ounce filet minon, one 16-ounce flat iron steak and one 13-ounce prime rib)
53	Juan In A Million	Austin, Texas	"Don Juan Breakfast Taco" (taco stuffed with chorizo sausage, eggs, bacon, potato, and secret spices)
52	Big Lou's Pizza	San Antonio, Texas	Home of the "Big Lou 42" (3 1/2-foot wide 20-25-pound pizza) and the "Lone Star Special" (pizza topped with beef brisket and barbecue sauce)
51	Max & Mina's Ice Cream	Queens, New York	"Funky Flavors" of ice cream (corn on the cob ice cream, beer nuts ice cream and donut ice cream)
50	Dinic's Roast Pork @ Reading Terminal Market	Philadelphia, Pennsylvania	Roast pork and beef sandwiches topped with broccoli rabe.
49	Country Pancake House	Ridgewood, New Jersey	Colossal pancakes topped with fruit, nine egg omelette.
48	Pappy's Smokehouse	St. Louis, Missouri	Apple and cherry wood smoked barbecue (beef brisket, full slab of pork ribs) Signature: "The Big Ben" (BBQ beef sandwich, BBQ pork, 1/4-pound BBQ chicken with 4 sides)
47	Superdawg Drive-In	Chicago, Illinois	Famous Chicago-style hot dogs
46	Matt's Bar	Minneapolis, Minnesota	Home of the "Jucy Lucy" (two hamburger patties stuffed with cheddar cheese)
45	Cecilia's Cafe	Albuquerque, New Mexico	Home of the "Fireman's Burrito" (2 1/2 to 3-pound burrito stuffed with sausage, bacon, eggs and hashbrowns topped with red chili, beans, avocado and carne asada, smothered with red and green chili sauces)
44	Doe's Eat Place	Greenville, Mississippi	Home of the 4-pound porterhouse steak.
43	Big Jud's Country Place	Boise, Idaho	Home of "Legend Burgers". Signature burger: "Double Big Jud Special" (two 1-pound patties topped with Swiss cheese, bacon and sauteed mushrooms)
42	Soddlak's Original Country Inn	Snook, Texas	Battered and deep fried bacon strips served with cream gravy.
41	Chino Bandido	Phoenix, Arizona	Chinese & Mexican Cuisine. Combo plate favorite: "Jade Red Chicken".

=== Episode 4 #40-21 ===
Rank #	Restaurant	Location	Specialty(s)
40	Slow's Bar-B-Que	Detroit, Michigan	Low & Slow Barbecue, signature dish: "BBQ Brisket Enchilada".
39	Grimaldi's Pizzeria	Brooklyn, New York	Coal-fire brick oven New York-style pizza (thin crust, tomato sauce, basil and mozzarella cheese)
38	Obrychi's Seafood Market	Fells Point, Baltimore, Maryland	Secret black pepper seasoned blue claw crabs. Signature dish: "Deviled Crab Balls".
37	Ted Drewes Frozen Custard	St. Louis, Missouri	Famous Frozen Custard. "The Concrete" (frozen custard thick milk shakes)
36	Markey's Lobster Pool vs. Brown's Lobster Pound	Seabrook, New Hampshire	Home of the best Lobster Rolls. Markey's uses mayo in lobster salad and a buttered hotdog roll. Brown's has the same but adds paprika on top.
35	The Thurman Cafe	Columbus, Ohio	Home of the "Thurman Burger" (3 1/4-pound hamburger patty topped with onions, mushrooms, American cheese and ham)
34	Junior's Cheesecake	Brooklyn, New York	15 different New York-style cheesecakes (with buttery cake crust)
33	Paseo	Seattle, Washington	Cuban sandwiches (roasted pork topped with cilantro, jalapeños, caramelized onions, romaine lettuce, and garlic aioli on a baguette)
32	R U Hungry (food truck) @ Rutgers University	New Brunswick, New Jersey	Home of the original "Fat Sandwiches" ("Fat Darrell" - stuffed with chicken fingers, mozzarella sticks and fries with marinara sauce)
31	Helena's Hawaiian Food	Honolulu, Hawaii	"Pipikaula" (roasted short ribs and kalua pork soaked in soy sauce), "Laulau" (pork and black cod steamed in a banana leaf)
30	Chipshop	Brooklyn, New York	Deep fried anything! Fish n' chips, deep fried pizza, deep fried candy bars and deep fried Twinkies.
29	Tony's I-75 Restaurant	Birch Run, Michigan	Home of the biggest BLT (bacon, lettuce and tomato sandwich) with a pile of bacon that equals 1-pound
28	Ben's Chili Bowl	Washington D.C.	Famous beef chili on anything! "Chili Half Smoke" (1/2 beef 1/2 pork sausage topped with chili, onion and mustard)
27	Heartattack Grill	Chandler, Arizona	Home of the "Quadruple Bypass Burger" (2-pound burger with four 1/2-pound patties with cheese served with "unlimited fry bar")
26	Beth's Cafe	Seattle, Washington	Home of the "Southwestern Exposure" (5-pound omelette - 12 eggs with cheese, sour cream, salsa and chili)
25	Acme Oyster House	New Orleans, Louisiana	Oysters any-style (Rockefeller-style, raw, fried, and grilled)
24	Charles Vergos' Rendezvous	Memphis, Tennessee	Charcoal grilled pork ribs, pulled pork and chopped chicken.
23	El Tepeyac Cafe	Los Angeles County, California	Home of the "Manuel's Special" (5-pound burrito topped with chili verde and pork chunks)
22	Lafayette Coney Island vs. American Coney Island	Detroit, Michigan	Both home of the "Coney Dogs" (hot dogs topped with chili, cheese, and onion)
21	Eagle's Deli	Boston, Massachusetts	Home of the stacked cheeseburgers. "Eagle's Challenge" (5-pound burger with 10 patties and 20 slices of bacon)

=== Episode 5 #20-1 ===
Rank #	Restaurant	Location	Specialty(s)
20	Voodoo Doughnut	Portland, Oregon	"Voodoo Doll Doughnut" (voodoo doll-shaped raspberry-jelly filled chocolate-covered donut with a pretzel stick stake), "Memphis Mafia" (fried donut with banana chunks, cinnamon glaze, chocolate and peanut butter frosting), "Triple Chocolate Penetration" (chocolate frosted chocolate cake donut topped with coco-puffs), "Maple Bacon Bar" (with maple frosting topped with bacon)
19	Lambert's Cafe	Sikeston, Missouri	Super-sized comfort food: ribs, ham, steak. Home of the "throwed dinner rolls" (waiters toss rolls to the patrons)
18	Cotham's Mercantile	Little Rock, Arkansas	Home of the "Hubcap Burger" (one-pound cheeseburger with 4 patties)
17	Anchor Bar	Buffalo, New York	Home to the original "Buffalo Wings".
16	The Big Texan Steak Ranch	Amarillo, Texas	"The Texas King Steak Challenge": 72-ounce (4 1/2-pound) steak, bread roll with butter, baked potato, ranch beans, shrimp cocktail, and side salad ($72.00).
15	Hillbilly Hot Dogs	Lesage, West Virginia	Home of "The Homewrecker" (15-inch one-pound hot dog topped with jalapeños, onions, peppers, chili, cole slaw, lettuce, tomatoes, cheese, ketchup and mustard). Other favorites: "Hound Dog" and "Egg Dog".
14	Arthur Bryant's Barbecue	Kansas City, Missouri	Half oak/half hickory wood smoked and sauced barbecue with vinegar-based sauce.
13	Jack-n'-Grill	Denver, Colorado	Massive breakfast burritos (12 eggs, potatoes, one-pound of ham and onions)
12	Gus's Fried Chicken	Memphis, Tennessee	World Famous Fried Chicken (batter spiced chicken)
11	Al's Beef	Chicago, Illinois	Italian Beef Sandwich (topped with giardiniera and dipped in au jus)
10	Durgin Park	Boston, Massachusetts	"Yankee Cooking" (32-ounce steak chop and prime rib)
9	Lulu's Bakery and Cafe	San Antonio, Texas	Chicken fried steak and giant cinnamon buns (3-pounds).
8	Albano's Pizzeria	Cicero, Illinois	Home of the "Pizza Puff" (calzone-type turn-over deep fried and stuffed with anything!)
7	The Salt Lick	Driftwood, Texas	Open-pit charcoal barbecue: beef brisket and sausage.
6	Pat's King of Steaks vs. Geno's Steaks	Philadelphia, Pennsylvania	Philly-style cheesesteaks with Cheese Wiz. Pat's chops up their ribeye meat and Geno's leaves the ribeye sliced.
5	Katz's Delicatessen	New York City, New York	Hand-sliced piled height pastrami and corn beef on rye sandwiches.
4	Fenton's Creamery	Oakland, California	Established in 1894. Homemade ice cream, 400 flavors: "Banana Special" (3-pounds banana split), cheesecake ice cream, toasted almond ice cream, "Black and Tan Sundae".
3	Primanti Brothers	Pittsburgh, Pennsylvania	20 different Italian stuffed sandiches (deli meats stuffed with vinegar-based cole salw and handcut fries between thick white bread)
2	Roscoe's House of Chicken and Waffles	Los Angeles County, California	World Famous Chicken and Waffles.
1	Louis' Lunch	New Haven, Connecticut	Home of the Original Hamburger Sandwich (with tomato, cheese on toast)

== 101 More Amazing Places to Chowdown (2014) ==
Note: This special was also nicknamed, "Chowdown Countdown 2".

=== Episode 1 #101-81 ===
Rank #	Restaurant	Location	Specialty(s)
101	Grinder's Pizza	Kansas City, Missouri	Speciality pizzas: "Le Hog" (pizza topped with Canadian bacon, sausage and hamburger), "Philly Cheesesteak Pizza" (topped with banana peppers and Cheese Wiz), "Chili Bomb" (pizza topped with pepperoni, chili, Cheese Wiz, tater tots and scallions)
100	Mr. Bartley's Burger Cottage	Cambridge, Massachusetts	30 different gourmet burgers: "Tom Brady Burger" (cheeseburger topped with guacamole), "The Celtics Burger" (bacon cheesier topped with lettuce, tomato and onions)
99	Watershed Restaurant	Atlanta, Georgia	"Tuesday Special Fried Chicken" (buttermilk pan-fried chicken served with mashed potatoes, green beans and biscuits; only served on Tuesdays)
98	Idle Spurs Steakhouse	Barstow, California	Ribeye, filet mignon and their speciality, prime rib with au jus and horseradish.
97	Bunk Sandwiches	Portland, Oregon	"Cubano" (Cuban-style sandwich with bourbon molasses pork belly (instead of traditional roast pork), ham, Swiss cheese, pickles and mustard)
96	Gilley's Hot Dogs	Portsmouth, New Hampshire	Steamed spiced hot dogs: "Chili Dog" (hot dog topped with chili con carne, sauerkraut, raw onions, mustard and ketchup)
95	Jimmy Cantler's Riverside Inn	Annapolis, Maryland	Steamed and spiced blue claw crabs dumped in a pile on your table.
94	My Brother's Bar	Denver, Colorado	Home of the "J.C.B." (cheeseburger topped with special cream cheese spread with jalapeño and pimento peppers), "The Johnny Burger" (topped with special cream cheese spread, Swiss cheese, cheddar cheese and grilled onions)
93	Amy Ruth's	New York City, New York	"Homestyle Southern Cuisine": "The Rev. Al Sharpton" (chicken and waffles), "The Al Roker" (barbecue short ribs), "The President Barack Obama" (choice of fried, smothered or barbecue chicken served with mac and cheese)
92	Al Johnson's Swedish Restaurant	Sister Bay, Wisconsin	Swedish meatballs (gravy-soaked meatballs made with 100% beef, limpa bread, eggs, salt and pepper)
91	Domilise's Po Boy and Bar	New Orleans, Louisiana	Domilise's Restaurant's famous po' boys: roast beef po' boy, fried oyster po' boy and fan favorite: fried shrimp po' boy (Gulf fried shrimp topped with mayo, lettuce, pickles and hot sauce)
90	Skylight Inn BBQ	Ayden, North Carolina	Whole hog barbecue (oak-fired pig), pulled pork, with hot sauce and vinegar.
89	Johnny's Comet II	Santa Rosa, New Mexico	"Part Mexican, Native American and Cowboy Chuck Wagon Cuisine": Steak Ranchero (chicken fried steak topped with a choice of five types of chili, cheese, served with a side of fried potatoes and rice and beans)
88	Chimneyville Smokehouse	Jackson, Mississippi	Low & Slow BBQ (16-hour smoked barbecue with hickory wood): Smoked spiced-rubbed beef brisket injected with beef broth.
87	Gail Ambrosius Chocolatier	Madison, Wisconsin	Hand-dipped dark chocolate truffles, fan favorites: "Lucille's Vanilla Truffle", "Caramel and Sea Salt Truffle", "Cinnamon Cheyenne Truffle", and "Espresso Truffle".
86	Sammy's L.A. Pastrami	Las Vegas, Nevada	Drive-thru massive sandwiches (42 sandwiches and 17 burger varieties): "Pastrami Burger" (topped with pastrami, provolone and mustard), "Zombie Burger" (three burger patties topped with cheese, 1/4-pound hot links, bacon, and two onion rings)
85	Datz Delicatessen	Tampa, Florida	Bacon, mac & cheese-stuffed meatloaf topped with ketchup and served with mashed potatoes and peas.
84	White Knight Diner	St. Louis, Missouri	Home of the "Super Slinger" (hamburger patty topped with an omelette, American cheese and vegetables topped with chili and hash browns)
83	Mrs. Wilkes Dining Room @ The Wilkes House	Savannah, Georgia	Family-style home cooking: Crispy fried chicken served with collard greens, mac and cheese and cornbread.
82	White Rabbit Fusion Cafe	Los Angeles, California	Food Truck that serves Filipino cuisine: "White Rabbit Burrito Challenge" (Chicken, beef, pork adobo burrito in a garlic sauce)
81	Paddy Long's	Chicago, Illinois	"Bacon Bonanza" (tasting plate of different kinds of bacon: Danish bacon, Irish bacon, jowl bacon and peppered bacon) and the "Bacon Bomb" (five-pound meatloaf made with beef, pork sausage, beer and barbecue sauce wrapped in a "bacon weave")

=== Episode 2 #80-61 ===
Rank #	Restaurant	Location	Specialty(s)
80	Sonny Bryan's Smokehouse	Dallas, Texas	Brisket sandwich (9-hours smoked beef brisket with homemade barbecue sauce on a hamburger bun)
79	Hot Doug's	Chicago, Illinois	21 kings of exotic sausage: Antelope, buffalo, kangaroo, rattlesnake. Most popular: Chicago-style hot dog.
78	Johnson's Corner (truck stop)	Johnstown, Colorado	Top 10 breakfast in the world (breakfast burritos, omelettes), world-famous cinnamon rolls (massive-size and seasonal flavors)
77	The Daily Catch Restaurant	Boston, Massachusetts	Homemade Italian and Sicilian specialities (only 10 tables), Lobster Fra Diavolo (fresh lobster, little necks, muscles, squid, and shrimp in a secret tomato sauce)
76	Tom + Chee	Cincinnati, Ohio	Grilled Cheese and Tomato Soup Restaurant: "The Armagoetta" (pepper jack cheese, fried onions, cherry peppers and goetta sausage with hot mustard between sourdough rye bread), Grilled Cheese Donut (cheddar cheese between a glazed donut)
75	The Blind Mule Bar & Restaurant	Mobile, Alabama	"Chili Cheeseburger" (half-pound patty topped with black bean chili topped with jalapeño queso and fried onion straws)
74	Gumbo Shop	New Orleans, Louisiana	Creole Cuisine: Chicken and Andouille Gumbo (with chicken, andouille sausage and rice)
73	The Rex	Billings, Montana	Bacon-Wrapped Grilled Bison (topped with crumbled blue cheese, rosemary demi-glace and onion crisps)
72	La Fonda Boricua	Spanish Harlem, New York City, New York	Puerto Rican Food: "El Mofongaso" (10-pound massive mofongo: Mashed plantains and pork with rice in "escabeche," a garlic sauce)
71	Kegel's Inn	Milwaukee, Wisconsin	German Cuisine: Weiner Schnitzel (breaded veal), Hasenpfeffer (rabbit stew in a sweet and sour gravy over noodles)
70	Martha's Lou's Kitchen	Charleston, South Carolina	Fried chicken served with red rice (super crispy skin, double-dipped deep-fried chicken)
69	Jethro's BBQ	Des Moines, Iowa	"Sizzling Wings" (dry-rubbed chicken wings), "Adam Emmenecker Sandwich" (challenge sandwich: breaded pork tenderloin, chicken fingers, bacon cheeseburger, brisket fried cheese all topped with cheese sauce)
68	Moonlite Bar-B-Que	Owensboro, Kentucky	Barbecue Buffet (includes barbecue mutton)
67	The Church Brew Works	Pittsburgh, Pennsylvania	"Pagan Pierogi" (pierogi dough filled with rattlesnake meat, southwest cactus and poblano peppers topped with a chipotle corn sauce)
66	Adam's Grub Truck	San Francisco, California	Asian Fusion food truck: "The Kraken" (2 jumbo deep-fried soft shell crabs with Asian slaw, bacon topped with avocado wasabi and roasted seaweed), "Ultimate Adam Bomb Challenge" (sandwich filled with fried chicken, pulled pork, jalapeño, eggs, Asian slaw, Spam, bacon on two grilled cheese buns)
65	Double Dogs	Bowling Green, Kentucky	"Dog Bowl Nachos" (tortilla chips topped with melted cheese, refried beans, black Angus chili, sausage, queso sauce, jalapeños and lime sour cream served in a huge dog bowl)
64	Tomasita's	Santa Fe, New Mexico	"Burrito Grande" (large burrito filled with hatch peppers chili and topped with "Christmas"—half red and half green chili sauces)
63	Tally's Cafe	Tulsa, Oklahoma	Famous Chicken Fried Steak (topped white gravy, served with eggs and hash browns)
62	Morrison Hotel Bar	Portland, Oregon	"Cheesy Pig Fries" (cheese fries topped with barbecue pulled pork and scallions)
61	PYT	Philadelphia, Pennsylvania	"Crazy Burgers": "Chocolate Bacon Donut Burger", "Deep-Fried Twinkie Burger" with bacon.

=== Episode 3 #60-41 ===
Rank #	Restaurant	Location	Specialty(s)
60	Sweatman's BBQ	Holly Hill, South Carolina	Whole-hog BBQ pork cooked over hand-split hardwood coals.
59	La Taqueria	San Francisco, California	Mission-style burritos
58	Melt Bar & Grill	Cleveland, Ohio	Grilled cheese sandwiches
57	Cafe Coyote	San Diego, California	Mexican cuisine
56	Goldberg's Deli	Bellevue, Washington	
55	This Is It	Houston, Texas	
54	Squeeze Inn	Sacramento, California	
53	Marabella's Meatball Company	Philadelphia, Pennsylvania	
52	Frontier Restaurant	Albuquerque, New Mexico	
51	Wagner's Pharmacy	Louisville, Kentucky	
50	The Pancake Pantry	Nashville, Tennessee	
49	Casa Orinda	Orinda, California	
48	The Spudder	Tulsa, Oklahoma	
47	Rack Shack	St. Paul, Minnesota	
46	Truck Yard	Dallas, Texas	
45	Poe's Tavern	Sullivan's Island, South Carolina	
44	Kloby's Smokehouse	Laurel, Maryland	
43	Phil's Last Stand	Chicago, Illinois	
42	Mama Carolla's	Indianapolis, Indiana	
41	Arthur's Tavern	Morris Plains, New Jersey	

=== Episode 4 #40-21 ===
Rank #	Restaurant	Location	Specialty(s)
40	Meat and Potatoes	Pittsburgh, Pennsylvania	Steakhouse. Specialty dishes: Leg of Beast, Meat and Potatoes for Two
39	The Varsity	Atlanta, Georgia	Cafeteria style food, largest hot dog stand in the world
38	Jamie's Broadway Castle	Sacramento, California	Specialty dish: Open-Faced Hot Turkey Sandwich
37	Gate's BBQ	Kansas City, Missouri	Specialty dish: Baby Back Ribs
36	The Hungry Owl	Mobile, Alabama	Southern comfort food, Specialty dish: The Stuffed Tony Burger
35	Chi'lantro	Austin, Texas	Korean-Mexican fusion food truck, Specialty dish: Kimchee fries
34	Benji's Deli	Milwaukee, Wisconsin	Jewish food, Specialty dish: Hero Israel Sandwich
33	The Donut Man	Glendora, California	Donuts, Specialty: The Strawberry Donut
32	Vesta Dipping Grill	Denver, Colorado	Steakhouse, Signature dish: 3-Pepper Grilled Flat-Iron Steak with Manilla Clams
31	Leo's BBQ	Oklahoma City, Oklahoma	Signature dish: Leo's Special (ribs, brisket, hot links, bologna, potato salad and coleslaw)
30	Sadie's	Albuquerque, New Mexico	Tex-Mex, Signature dish: Sopaipilla (6 1/2 lbs of pork, chicken, beef, potatoes, beans, green and red chili and cheese)
29	D Spot	Maplewood, Minnesota	80 different types of chicken wings
28	Cowgirl BBQ	Santa Fe, New Mexico	Signature dishes: Diablo Nachos, Green Chili Cheeseburger
27	Linger Lodge	Bradenton, Florida	BBQ, Signature dishes: Gator Bites, Alligator Ribs, Gator Chowder
26	Homeroom Mac + Cheese	Oakland, California	Signature dish: Trailer Mac (macaroni with a hot dog, 2 cheeses, bechamel sauce and potato chips)
25	Bacon Mania	Orange County, California	Food truck, Signature dish: The Jack Back Sammy (egg bread stuffed with sharp cheddar cheese and hickory smoked bacon)
24	Gino's East	Chicago, Illinois	Pizzeria, Signature dish: The Meaty Legend (deep dish pizza with mozzarella, Italian sausage, pepperoni, Canadian bacon, bacon and sauce)
23	Pepperfire	Nashville, Tennessee	Country fried chicken with 6 different heat levels to choose from
22	Ted's Restaurant	Meriden, Connecticut	Steamed cheeseburgers
21	Big-Ass Sandwiches	Portland, Oregon	Food truck, Signature dish: The Big-Ass Roast Beef (roast beef, bacon, onions, cheddar cheese sauce, hot sauce and french fries)

=== Episode 5 #20-1 ===
Rank #	Restaurant	Location	Specialty(s)
20	Lexie's Joint	Portsmouth, New Hampshire	
19	Beau Jo's	Idaho Springs, Colorado	
18	Lardo	Portland, Oregon	
17	Vitek's BBQ	Waco, Texas	
16	Kravings	Los Angeles, California	
15	Two Sister's Kitchen	Jackson, Mississippi	
14	Suppenkuche	San Francisco, California	
13	Glorioso's Italian Market	Milwaukee, Wisconsin	
12	Pink's Hot Dogs	Los Angeles, California	
11	Mother's	New Orleans, Louisiana	
10	Grizzly Manor Cafe	Big Bear Lake, California	
9	KnockBack Nat's Sports Bar	Cincinnati, Ohio	
8	Carnegie Deli	New York, New York	
7	Faidley Seafood	Baltimore, Maryland	
6	Tony Luke's	Philadelphia, Pennsylvania	
5	The Fifty/50	Chicago, Illinois	
4	Peter Luger Steak House	New York, New York	
3	Prince's Hot Chicken Shack	Nashville, Tennessee	
2	Franklin Barbecue	Austin, Texas	
1	5-8 Club	Minneapolis, Minnesota	
