= Nick Tahou Hots =

Restaurant in Rochester, New York

Coordinates: 43°09′13″N 77°37′16″W

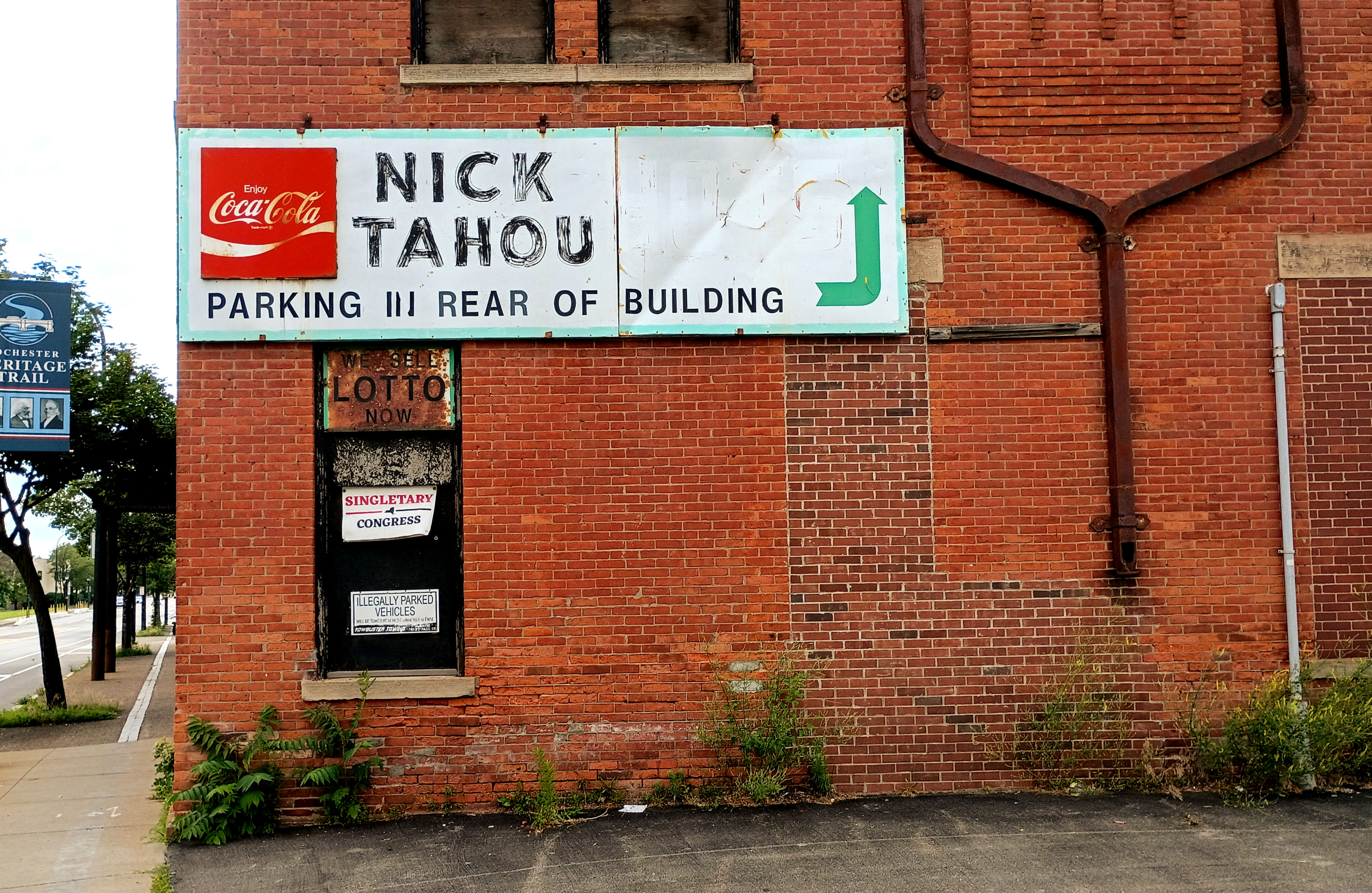
- Interactive map of Nick Tahou Hots

Restaurant information
- Established: 1918; 108 years ago
- Location: Rochester, New York
- Website: www.garbageplate.com

Nick Tahou Hots is a restaurant in Rochester, New York, best known for a dish called the Garbage Plate. The restaurant was founded in 1918 by Alex Tahou, the grandfather of the 21st-century owner (also named Alex Tahou), and named for Nick Tahou, the founder's son, who operated the establishment until his death in 1997. While there are other Upstate New York variants, Nick Tahou's is the originator of the trademarked Garbage Plate.

== Garbage Plate ==
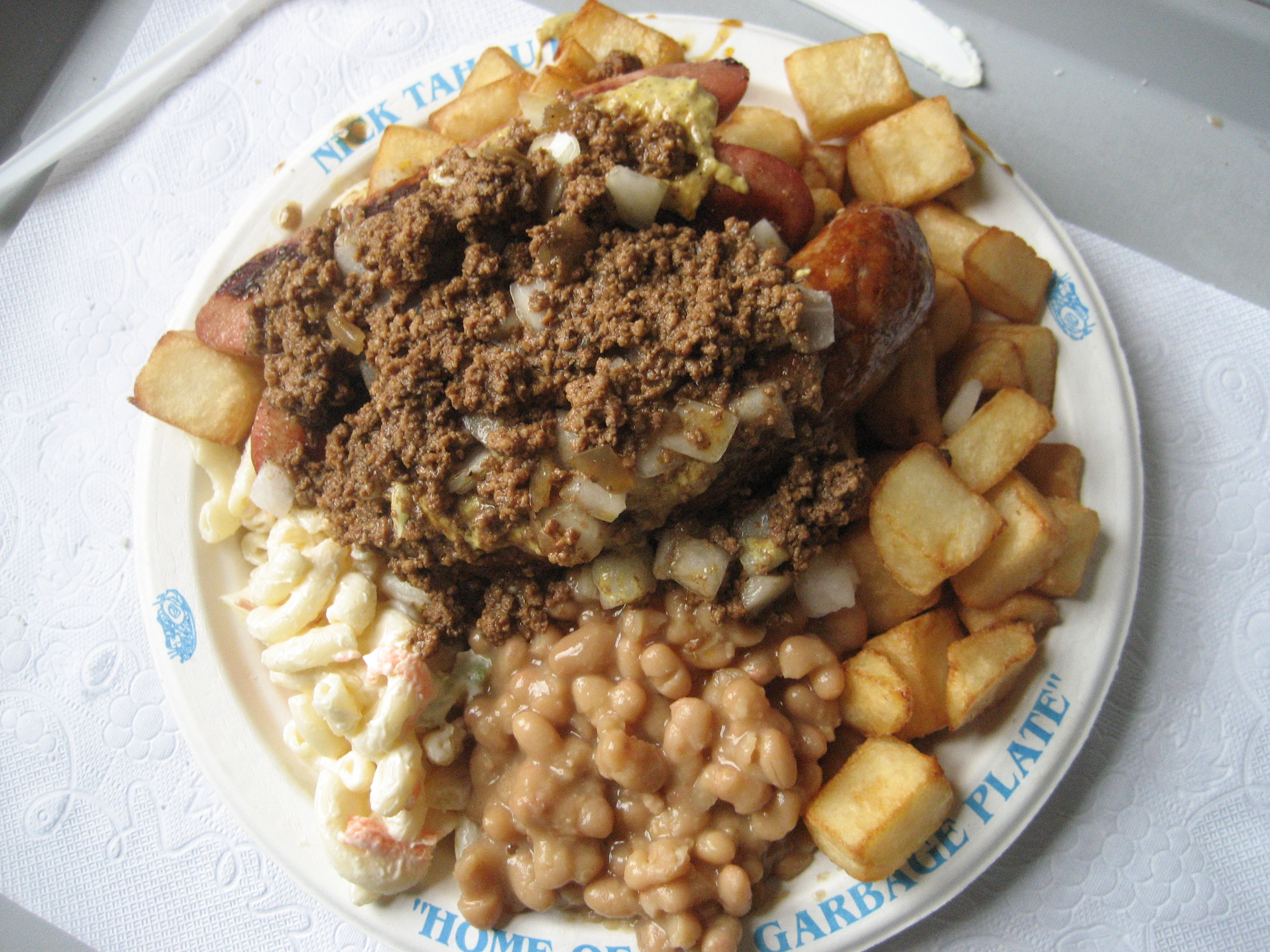
An authentic Garbage Plate from Nick Tahou Hots

Nick Tahou Hots's best known dish is the Garbage Plate, which consists of a selection of home fries, macaroni salad, baked beans and French fries topped with meats of the customer's choice. The dish can be garnished with mustard, chopped onions, ketchup and the venue's signature hot sauce, and is served with bread and butter. The Garbage Plate is typically mixed together by the diner before being eaten.

Nick Tahou created the dish as two hamburger patties with a selection of side dishes. Alex Tahou made the original plate with hot dogs, home fries, cold beans and two pieces of Italian bread and butter. It was known as hots and potatoes. The dish has spawned several imitators with similar names in the Greater Rochester area, including Fairport Hots' "The Hot Plate", Tom Wahl's "55 Junker Plate" and Mark's Texas Hots' "Sloppy Plate".

== Philanthropy ==
A charitable Garbage Plate Run is sponsored by the University of Rochester's Sigma Phi Epsilon. Held annually in the spring, this three-man race begins at the U of R River Campus. The first of the team members run 2.2 miles (3.5 km) through the city to Nick Tahou's. Once they arrive, the second teammate eats a Garbage Plate as quickly as they are able, then the final teammate runs back to campus to complete the race. In a race titled the "Ironman", one-man teams attempt to complete all three tasks alone. The Mount Hope Family Center is the recipient of all proceeds collected during the event, including sponsor funds and contestant's entry fees.

== Other locations ==
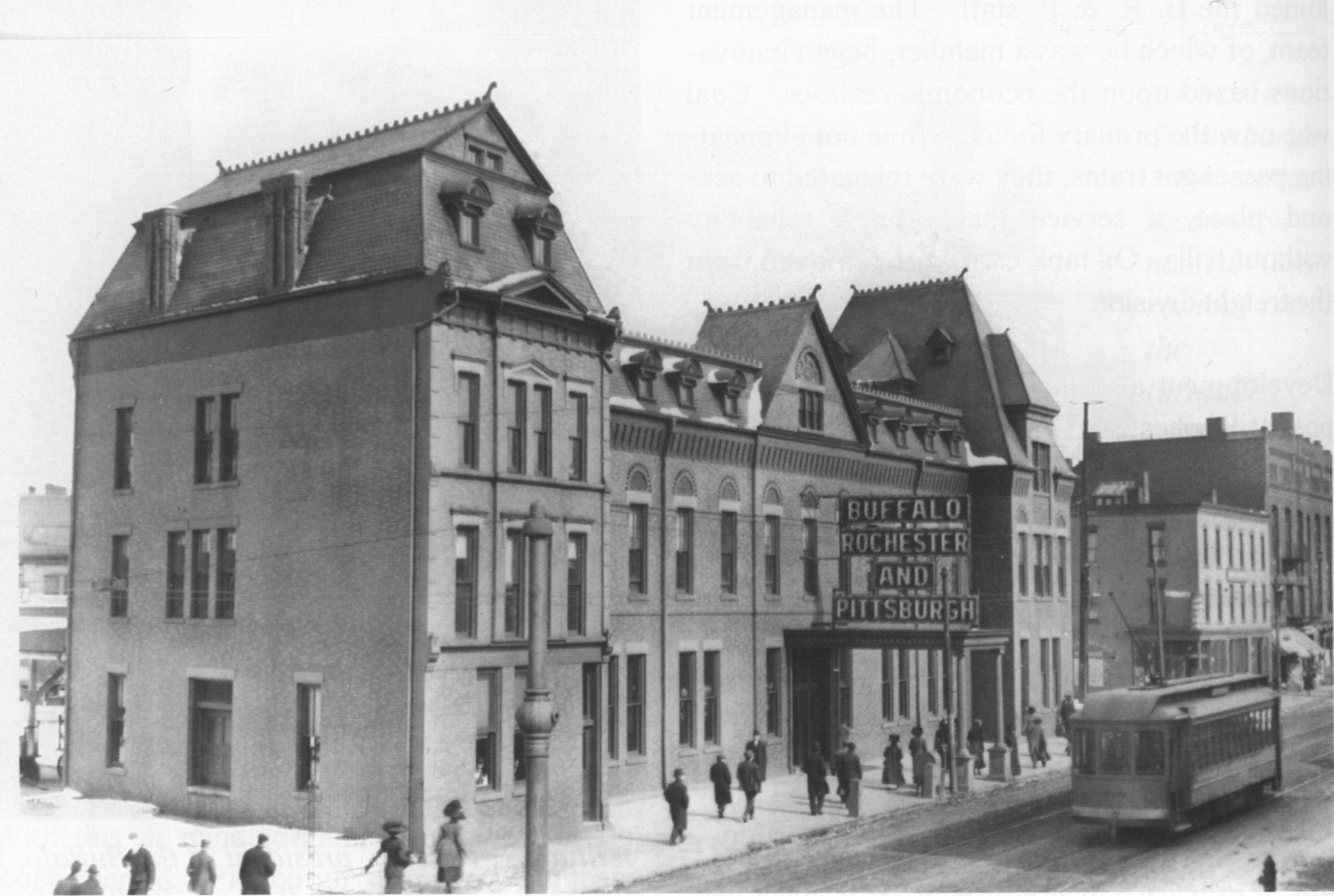
Formerly the Rochester terminal of the Buffalo, Rochester, and Pittsburgh Railway on Main Street West (Now part of NY Route 33) at Oak Street, today the Nick Tahou restaurant (circa 1900)

In the mid-1950s, Nick Tahou's hot dog stand was located in a smaller building just to the east, which is shown in the picture on this page, of its longtime location. From 1979 to 2007, there were two Nick Tahou Hots restaurants in Rochester: one in downtown Rochester in the former Buffalo, Rochester, and Pittsburgh Railway station on West Main Street, to the west of the I-490 overpass and a satellite restaurant on Lyell Avenue (NY Route 31) in Gates. In 2007, Steve Tahou and his sister Joanne Tahou-Demkou, the children of Ike Tahou (Nick's brother), assumed full ownership of the Lyell Avenue location and renamed it Steve T. Hots and Potatoes. Steve Tahou returned to using Rochester-based Zweigle's hot dogs and Italian sausages, which were used in the original garbage plates at Nick's. The original West Main Street location continues to use the trademarked "Nick Tahou" and "Garbage Plate" names, and continues to use the Nick Tahou Hot Dog branded dogs in their plates. While previously open all night, the downtown restaurant began closing at 8 p.m. in 1998 in voluntary compliance with the city's effort to reduce troublesome night spots. Steve T. Hots and Potatoes is open until 1:00am Sunday - Thursday and until 3:30am on Fridays and Saturdays.

There was also a short-lived Nick Tahou's operation in Oswego, New York, that opened in September 1995 adjacent to the SUNY Oswego campus.

On August 3, 2010, a second location opened at 3070 West Henrietta Road (NYS Route 15), in the town of Henrietta, New York. It closed in early 2014.

== Features ==
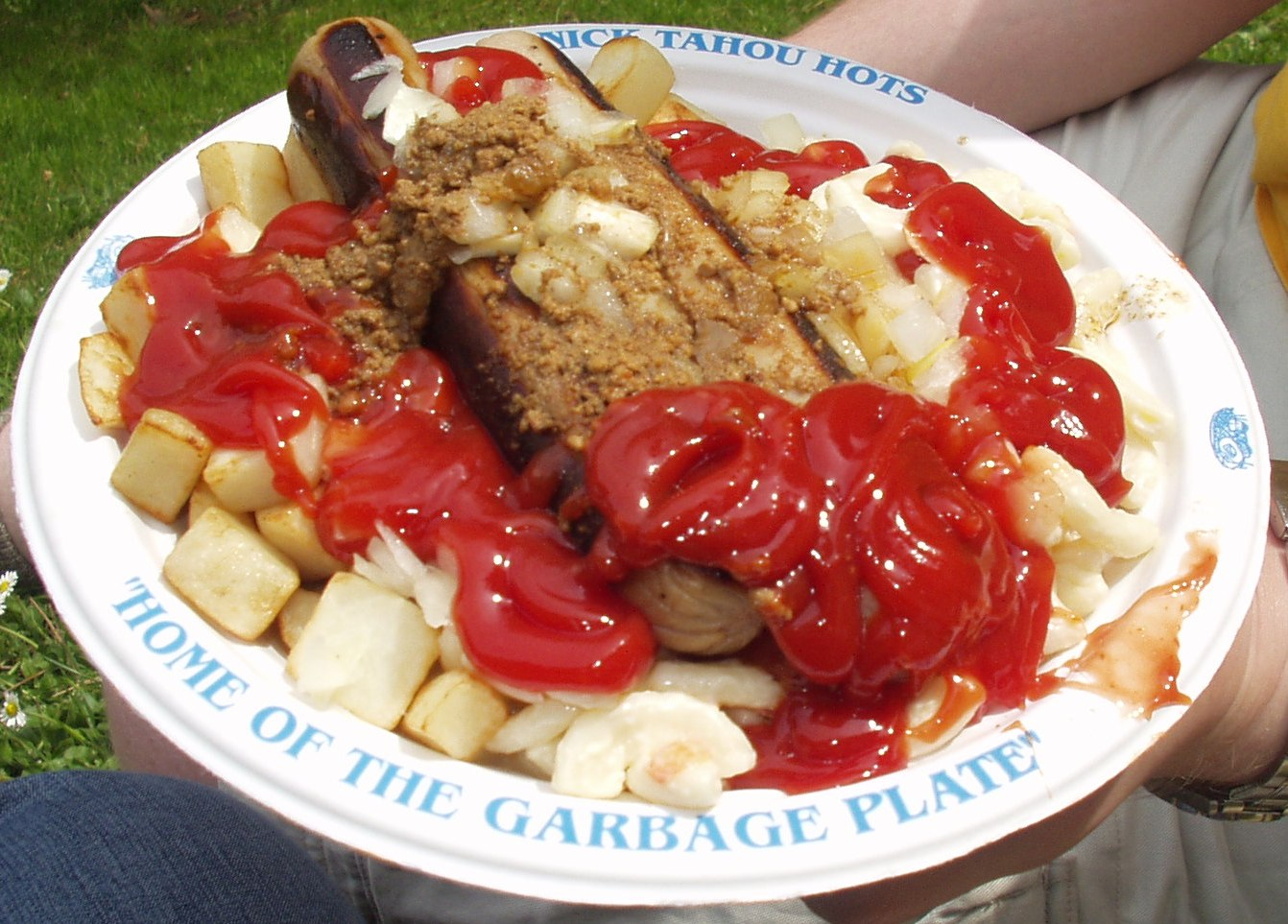
Nick Tahou's Garbage Plate

Nick's has been featured on Food Network's Unwrapped episode titled "Funny Foods" as well as the City in a Box Monopoly-based board game showcasing famous Rochester locales. The Garbage Plate was also highlighted in the July 2007 issue of the US Airways inflight magazine.

On the November 16, 2009, episode of The Daily Show, host Jon Stewart told the people of Rochester to "get their heads out of their Garbage Plates." On February 23, 2011, the Food Network filmed a segment for the show The Best Thing I Ever Ate on the recommendation of pastry chef Johnny Iuzzini. Nick Tahou's was also featured on the Travel Channel series Chowdown Countdown, where it ranked No. 81 out of 101 locations. In 2011 it was featured on a Rochester episode of the Travel Channel's Man v. Food Nation, starring Adam Richman.

In the 2012 film The Place Beyond the Pines, Garbage Plates are mentioned as a "must have" for Bradley Cooper's character Avery when he travels through Rochester, New York.

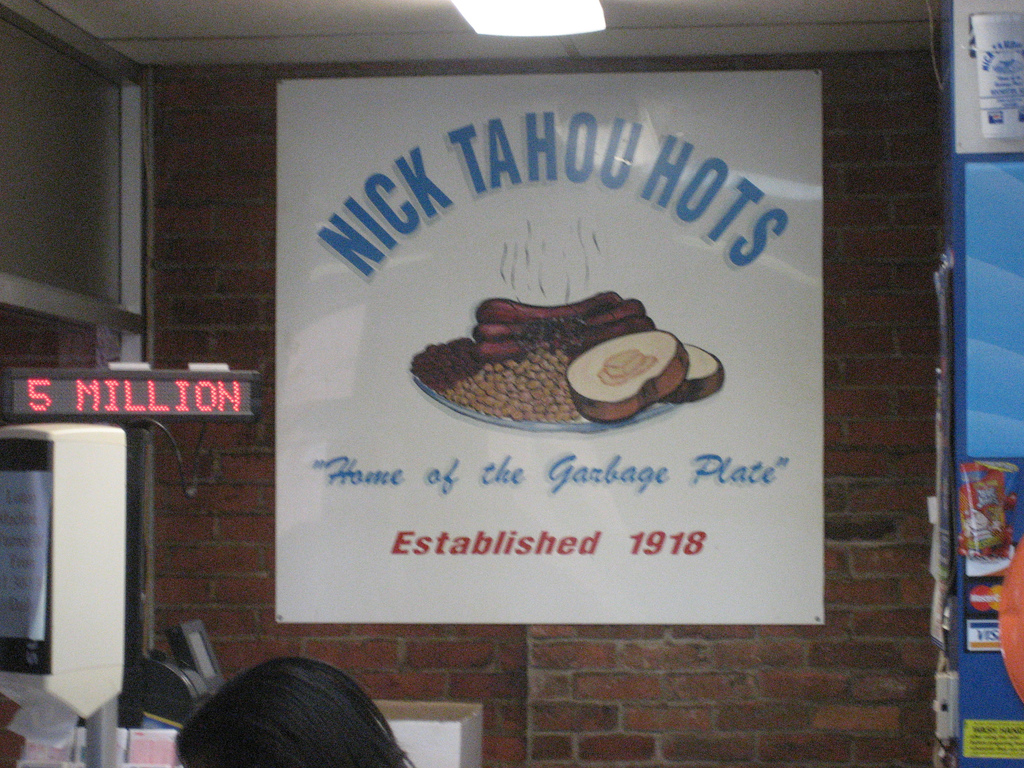
Nick Tahou Hots

In 2017, YouTuber Jenna Marbles (who grew up in Rochester) mentioned Garbage Plates as her favorite food and in "My Boyfriend Cooks My Favorite Meal" got her boyfriend, Julien Solomita, to make her a vegan version. Another YouTuber and Rochester native, Andrew Rea of Binging with Babish, recreated the Garbage Plate in one of his weekly episodes, inspired by the mention of the dish in The Place Beyond the Pines.

In 2020, comedian Jim Gaffigan, while on tour in Rochester, stopped by Nick Tahou Hots and enjoyed a Garbage Plate. He subsequently talked about his experience on Conan.

The dish has been featured in numerous publications, including The New York Times, Saveur, HuffPost, and Food & Wine.

== See also ==
- Burgoo
- Carne asada fries
- Chorrillana
- Disco fries
- Halal snack pack
- Horseshoe sandwich
- İskender kebap
- Loco moco
- Nasi ambeng
- Okonomiyaki
- Poutine
- Slinger
