= Garbage Plate =

American meat dish

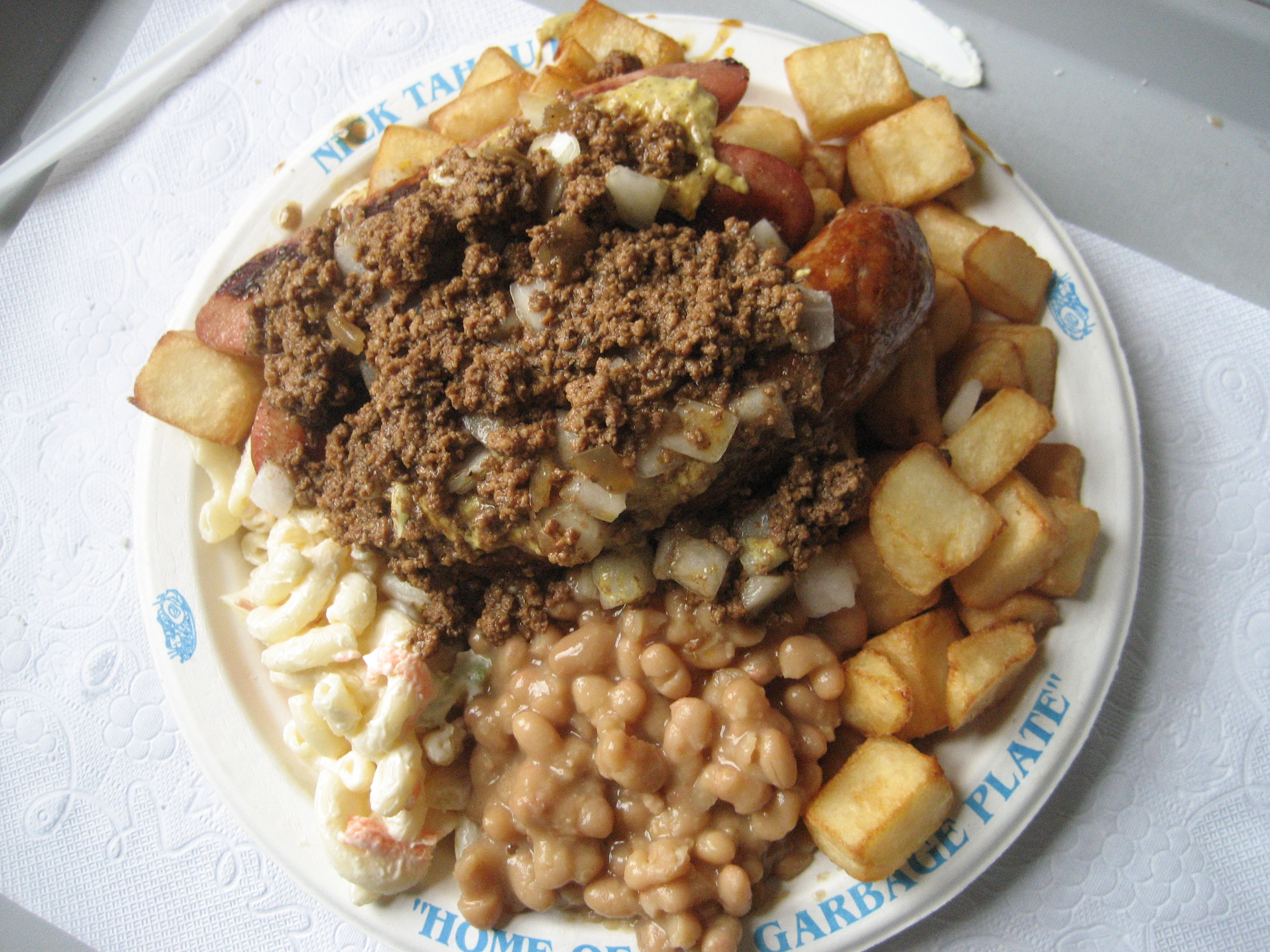
- Garbage Plate from Nick Tahou Hots
- Alternative names: Rochester plate; trash plate; plate
- Place of origin: United States
- Region or state: Rochester, New York
- Created by: Alexander Tahou
- Main ingredients: Hot dog or hamburger meat, meat hot sauce, mustard, onions, Choice of 2: macaroni salad, home fries, French fries, baked beans

The Garbage Plate is an American dish consisting of hot dog or hamburger meat, meat hot sauce, and other condiments, piled atop a variety of side dishes, typically including macaroni salad and home fries. It is usually served with a side of buttered bread.

A trademark of the restaurant Nick Tahou Hots in Rochester, New York, which originated the dish in 1918, the Garbage Plate has become the signature dish of Rochester, now served by numerous restaurants under modified names such as Rochester plate, trash plate, or simply plate.

== History ==
The Garbage Plate was originated by restaurateur Alexander Tahou, a Greek immigrant who founded the restaurant Nick Tahou Hots under the name West Main Texas Hots in Rochester, New York, in 1918. In its original form, the dish consisted of "hots"—either standard hot dogs, or Rochester-style white hots—served with potatoes, cold beans, and Italian bread with butter.

The dish evolved over time after Tahou's son Nick assumed ownership of the restaurant in the 1940s and changed the restaurant's name to Nick Tahou Hots. Over time, the restaurant began offering plates with hamburger meat instead of hots, added other topping options including macaroni salad, and introduced their signature chili-like hot meat sauce, which came from a family recipe of a Mexican friend of Alexander Tahou's and became an integral topping for the dish.

The dish only came to be known as the Garbage Plate as early as the 1980s, when college students would come to Nick Tahou Hots and ask for "that plate with all the garbage on it". After the Tahou family initially resisted the name because "it's food; it doesn’t sound good", the restaurant filed a United States trademark for the name Garbage Plate in 1991, preventing other restaurants from selling the dish under the same name.

== Variants ==
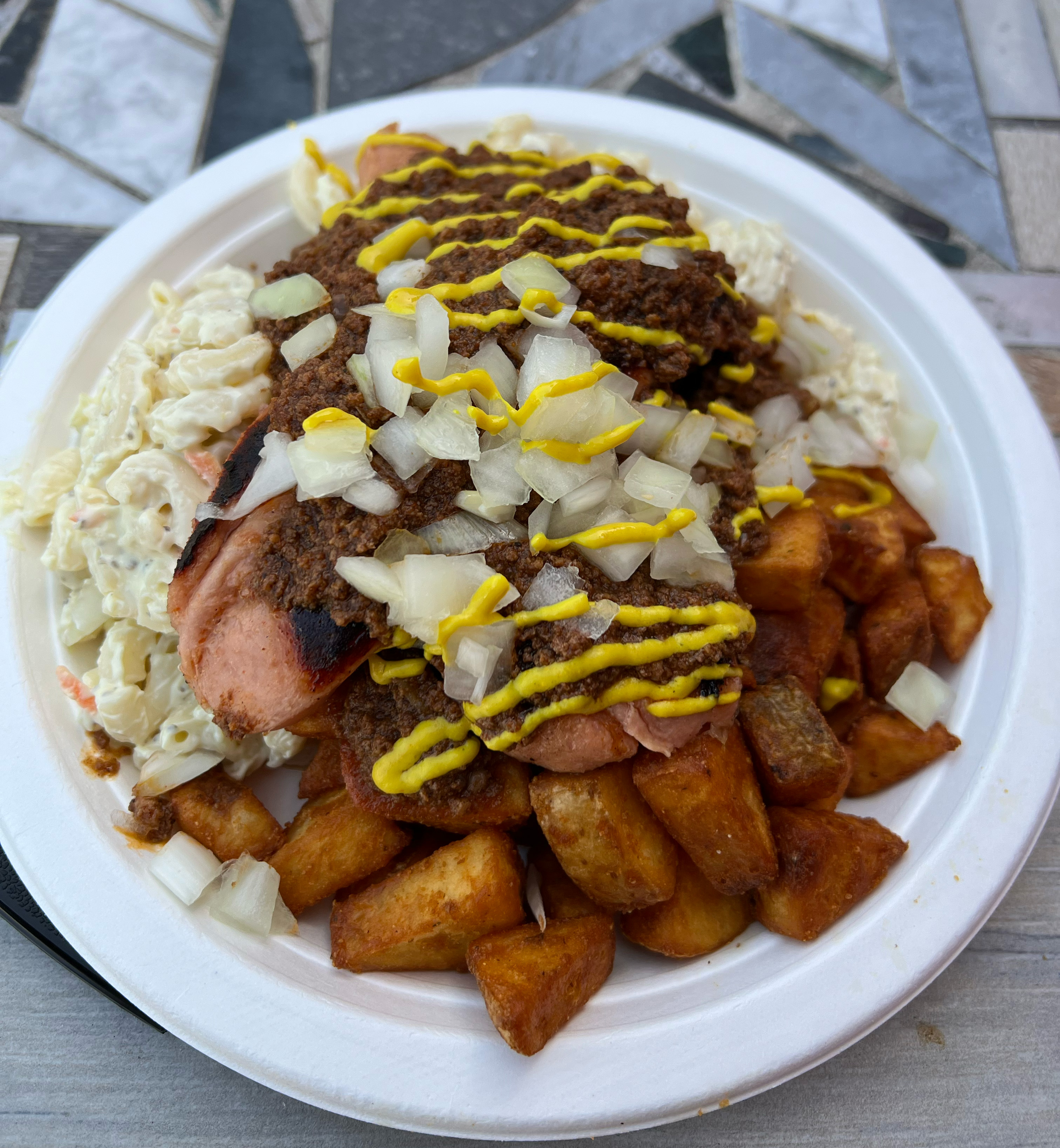
Junkyard Plate, a variant on the Garbage Plate, from Rochester restaurant Dogtown

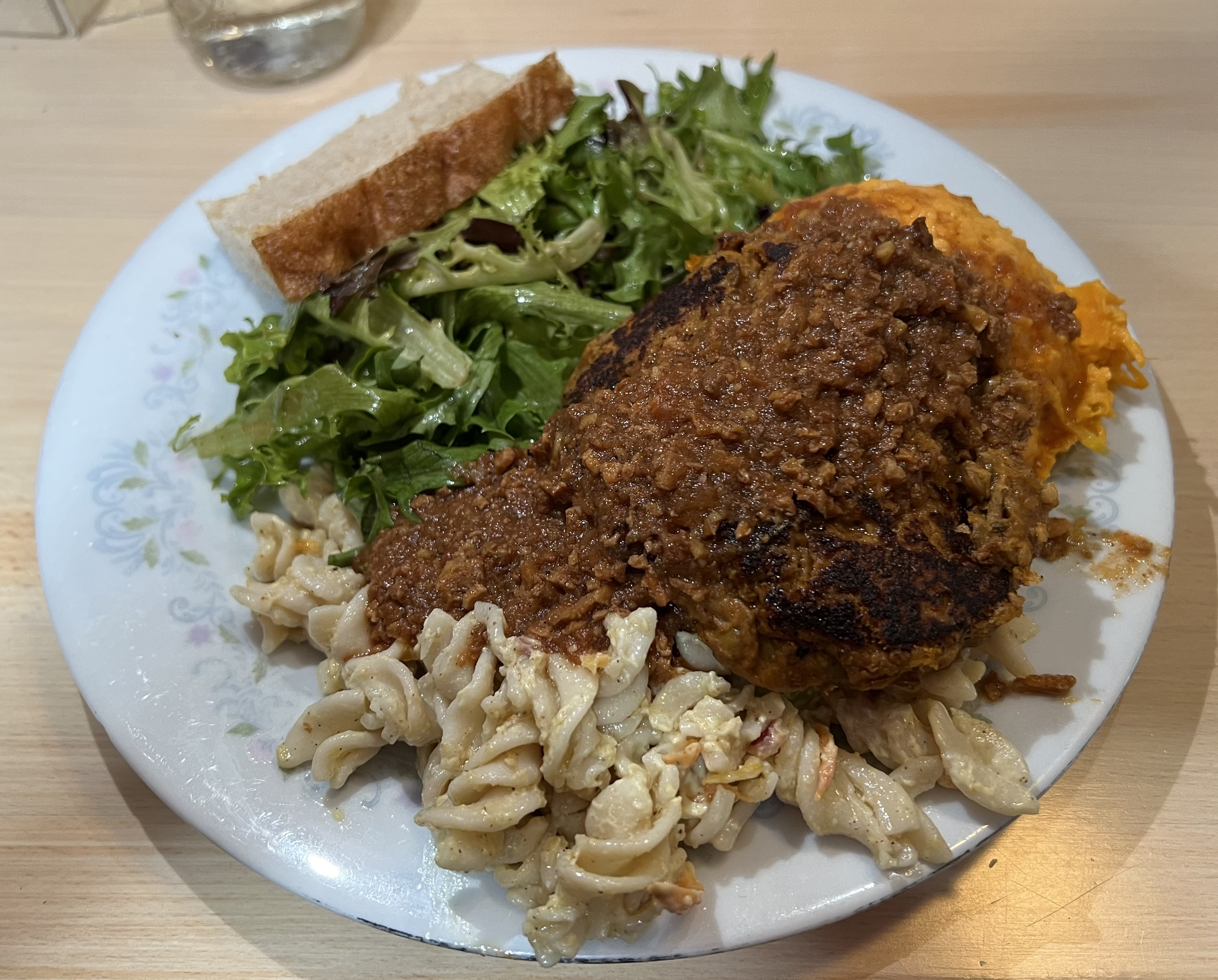
Compost Plate, a vegan variant on the Garbage Plate, from Rochester restaurant The Red Fern

To avoid trademark infringement against Nick Tahou Hots, many restaurants in Rochester and surrounding areas offer "copycat" dishes similar to the Garbage Plate but under modified names, such as Rochester plates, junkyard plates, trash plates, hot plates, rubbish plates, sloppy plates, or messy plates. The Rochester restaurant The Red Fern offers a vegan variant on the Garbage Plate called the Compost Plate.

Restaurants offering variants on the Garbage Plate have spread beyond the Rochester metropolitan area, also appearing in New York City, Pittsburgh, Raleigh, and Denver, among other cities.

== Legacy ==
With its iconic status, multiple news outlets have described the Garbage Plate as an essential symbol of Rochester. Jim Memmott of the Democrat and Chronicle called the Garbage Plate "Rochester's signature thing," arguing that it even eclipses the prominence of Rochester institution Kodak. Meghan O'Dea of Eater wrote that "Rochester's plate is so essentially a part of this place that they almost can't be disconnected," adding that, "like Rochester itself, the Garbage Plate has a little bit of everything." The Garbage Plate has also been widely touted as a hangover remedy.

In August 2017, in celebration of the 100th anniversary of the Garbage Plate, the Rochester Red Wings of Minor League Baseball briefly changed their name to the "Rochester Plates", with a special promotion offering variants on the Garbage Plate including one called the "Home Plate". The team renewed the "Rochester Plates" moniker in 2018, assuming the name at every Thursday home game, and unveiled a Garbage Plate–themed mascot named Mac in 2019.

== See also ==
- Horseshoe sandwich, a similar dish from Springfield, Illinois
- Franks Diner, a diner in Kenosha, Wisconsin, that serves an egg dish also called the Garbage Plate
- Slinger, a similar dish from St. Louis, Missouri
