= Domilise's Restaurant =

Coordinates: 29.9175°N 90.1124°W

Domilise's Po-Boy and Bar
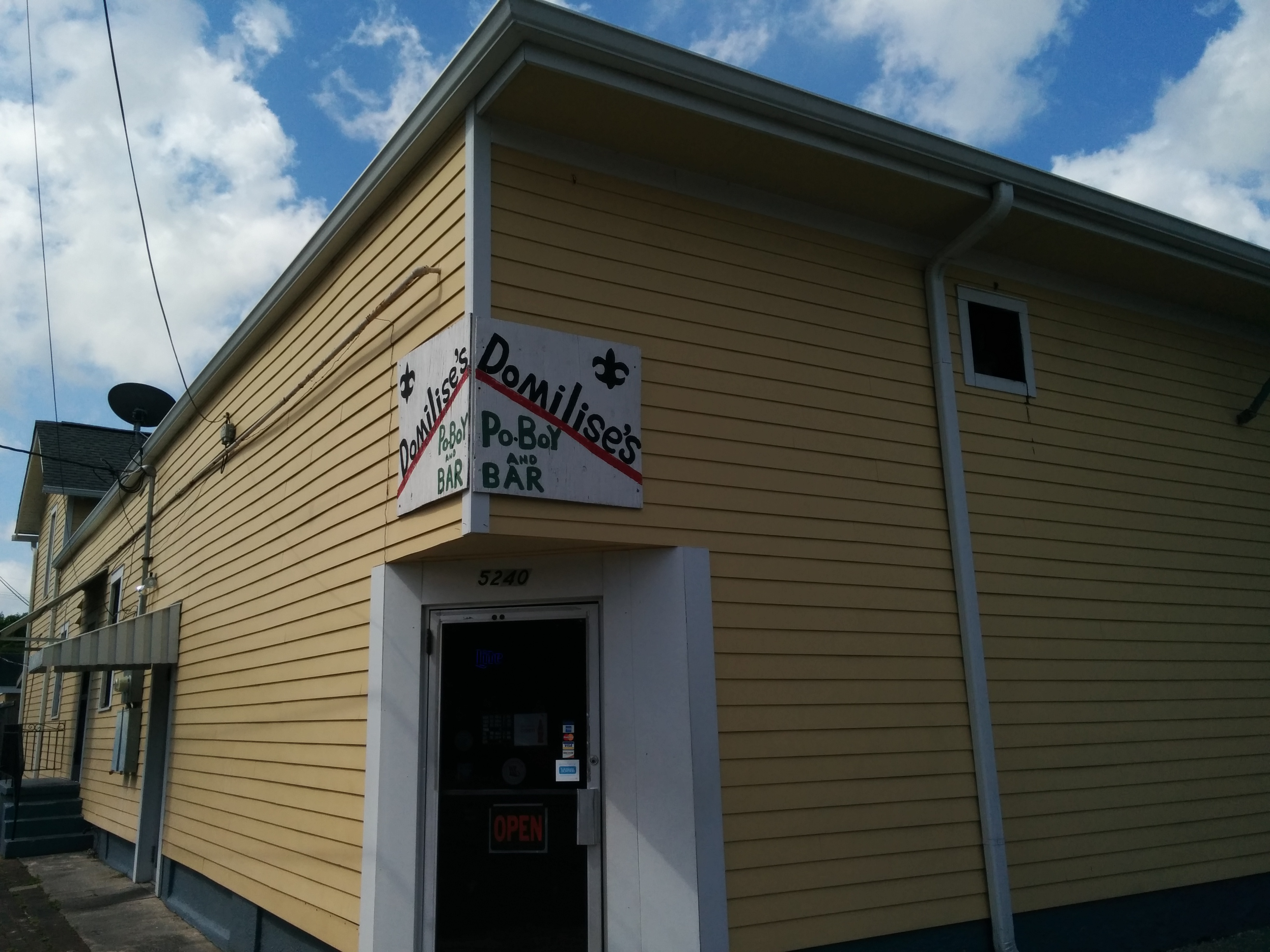
- Exterior of Domilise's on the corner of Bellecastle and Annunciation Street
- Interactive map of Domilise's Po-Boy and Bar

Restaurant information
- Established: 1930s
- Food type: Po-boy sandwiches
- Dress code: Casual
- Location: 5240 Annunciation Street, New Orleans, Orleans Parish, Louisiana, USA
- Website: www.domilisespoboys.com

Domilise's Po-Boy and Bar is an uptown New Orleans restaurant known for its po-boy sandwiches. The restaurant was founded in the 1930s by the Domilise family, who lived in the house above the single-room bar/dining area, and was run by Sam and Dorothy “Miss Dot” Domilise for over seventy-five years until her death in 2013. The restaurant was closed during 2005's Hurricane Katrina while the family evacuated to Alabama and to Franklin, Louisiana.

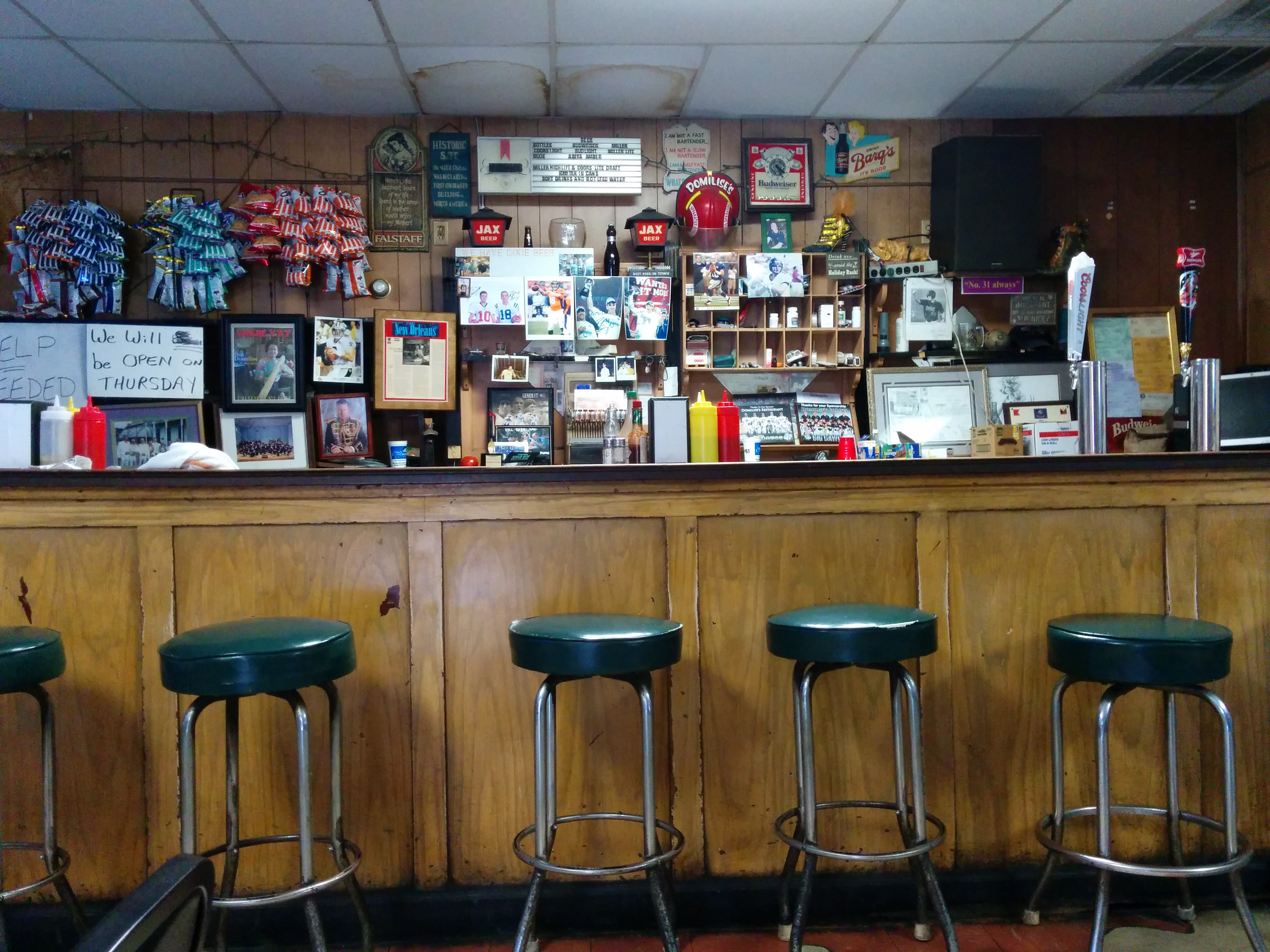
Interior of Domilise's Po-boy and Bar in New Orleans.

The interior of the restaurant features photos of famous visitors, memorabilia, and has a bar in addition to the six tables. The restaurant has been featured in many cooking shows and guide books, such as Adam Richman's Best Sandwich in America, Sandwiches That You Will Like, Food Wars, and Chowdown Countdown. On Best Sandwich in America, Domilise's fried shrimp po-boy was named the best sandwich on the Gulf Coast.

== See also ==
- List of Michelin Bib Gourmand restaurants in the United States
