= Jucy Lucy =

Burger with cheese inside the meat

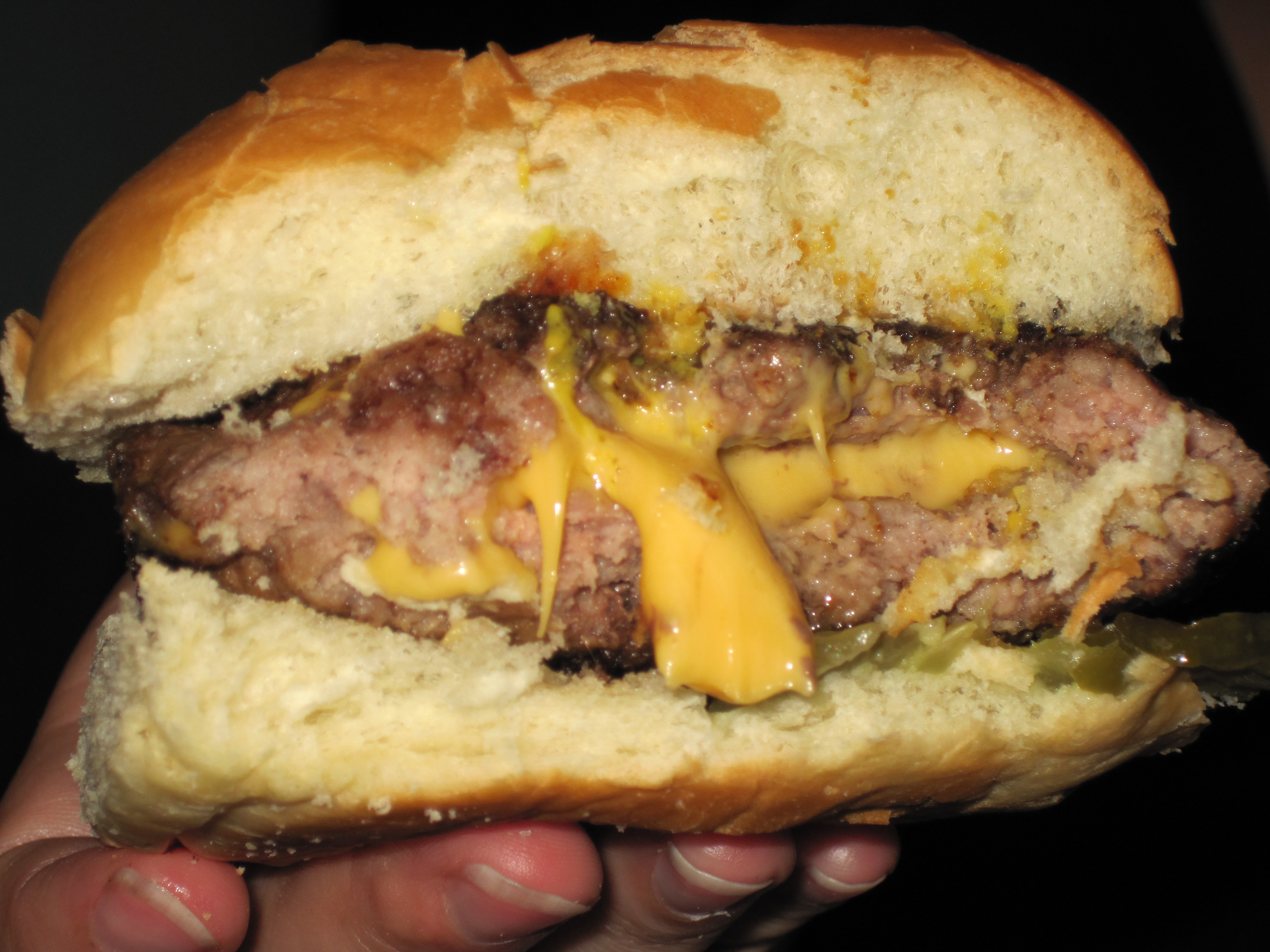
- Cross-section of a Jucy Lucy, showing the molten cheese in the center of the patty
- Alternative names: Juicy Lucy
- Course: Entree
- Place of origin: United States
- Region or state: Minnesota
- Created by: Multiple claims
- Serving temperature: Hot
- Main ingredients: Hamburger, cheese
- Variations: Multiple
- Food energy (per serving): 600 kcal (2,500 kJ)

A Jucy Lucy (or Juicy Lucy) is a stuffed cheeseburger with the cheese inside of the meat instead of on top, resulting in a melted core of cheese. It is a popular, regional dish in Minnesota, particularly in the Twin Cities of Minneapolis and Saint Paul. Two bars in Minneapolis claim to have invented the burger, while other local bars and restaurants have created their own interpretations of the style.

== Origins ==
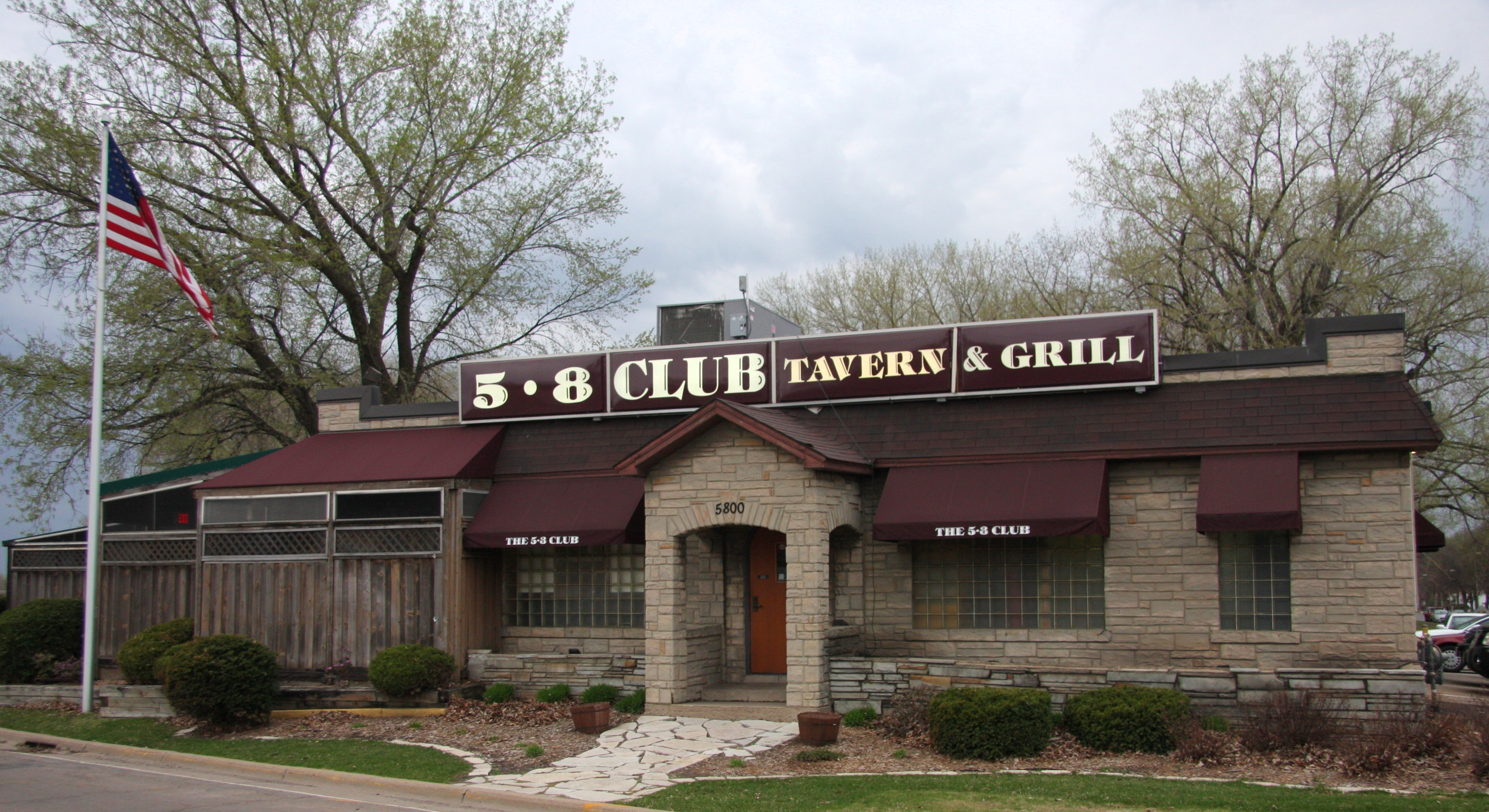
The 5·8 Club

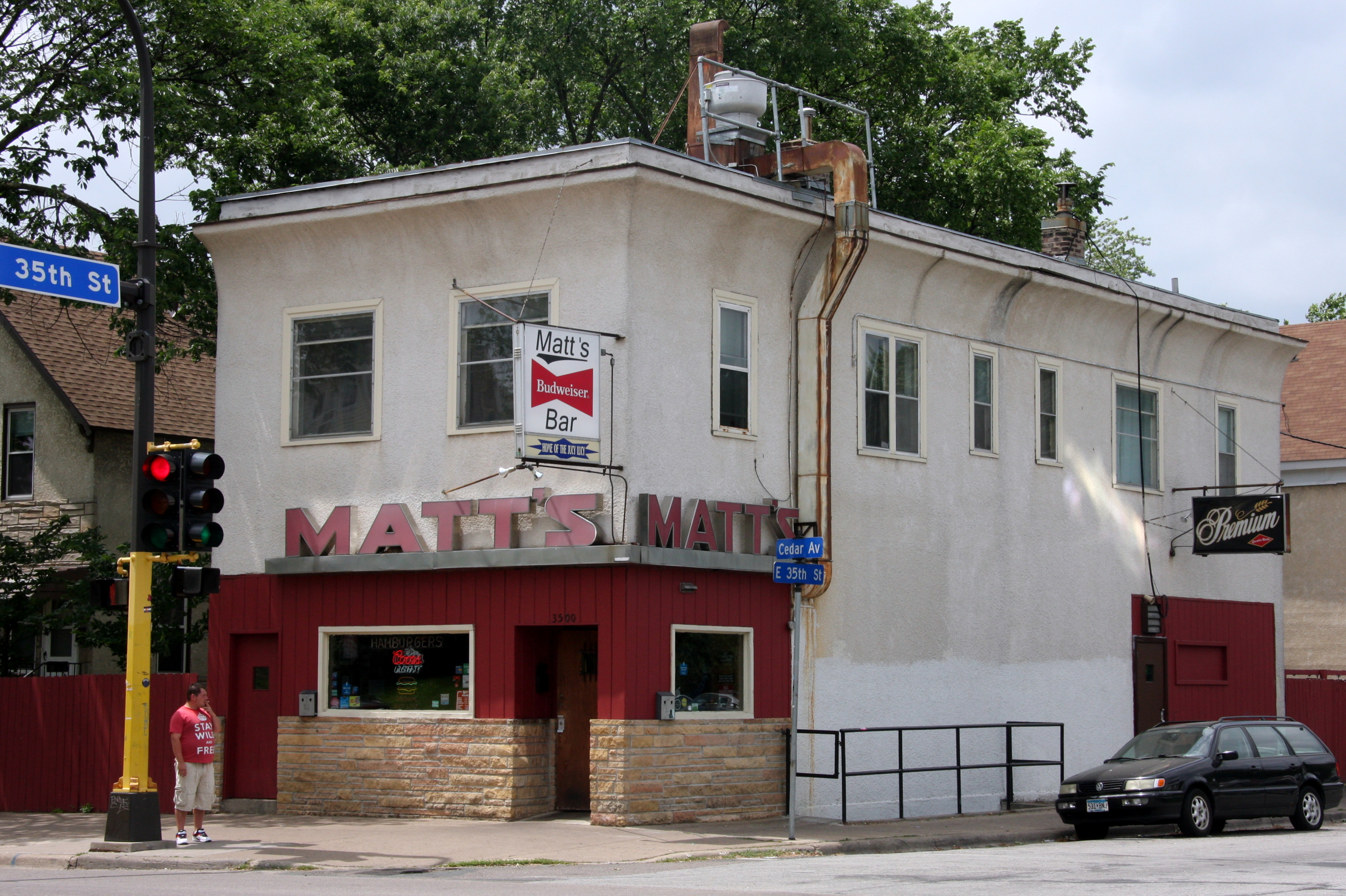
Matt's Bar

Two bars about three miles (5 km) from each other on Cedar Avenue in South Minneapolis both claim to have invented the burger: Matt's Bar and the 5-8 Club. Matt's credits the bar's former owner (and namesake) Matt Bristol. One account claims it preceded his purchase of the bar in the 1950s, but that Bristol formally added it to the menu and thus popularized it. Another version is that the burger was invented by a customer in 1954 who remarked "Oooh, that's one juicy lucy!" after biting into it. The 5-8 Club does not provide a particular origin story, but the bar itself was originally a speakeasy dating to the 1920s.

The two bars offer slightly different versions of the burger. One difference is the spelling: Matt's removes the letter "i" in "Juicy" (supposedly an inadvertent misspelling dating to the burger's creation), while the 5-8 Club utilizes the normal spelling. Shirts worn by staff at the 5-8 Club have the motto "if it's spelled right, it's done right" while advertising for Matt's Bar says "Remember, if it is spelled correctly, you are eating a shameless rip-off!" The 5-8 Club offers several different cheese options for their version while the version at Matt's only contains American cheese.

The rivalry between both bars and their interpretations is longstanding, but has gained more exposure since receiving a mention in Time in 2008 and being featured on food-related television shows such as Man v. Food and Food Wars. In 2014, President Barack Obama visited Matt's and had a Jucy Lucy, prompting the 5-8 Club to offer him one of theirs.

In 2018, the editors of Thrillist wrote that "The Jucy Lucy is ... an important milestone in the evolution of hamburgers themselves, leading the charge for industrious chefs (and more than a few infomercial entrepreneurs) to begin stuffing their burgers."

== Preparation ==
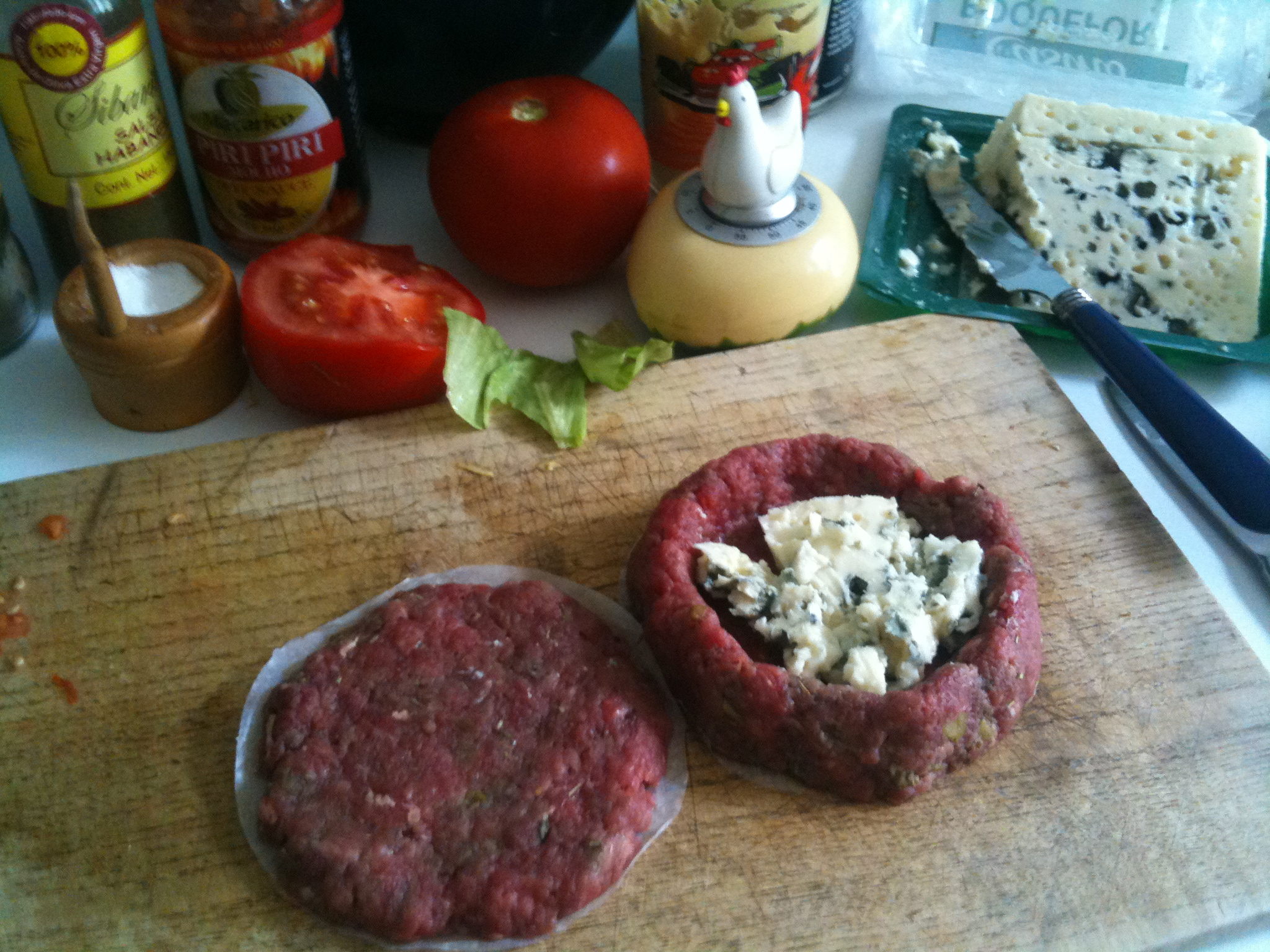
A homemade Juicy Lucy patty, uncooked and unassembled

The burger is prepared by putting cheese between two patties of meat and sealing them around the cheese to create a single patty with a cheese core. As the burger cooks, the cheese inside melts. This has the effect of keeping the meat near the center of the burger very juicy. It also separates the cheese from the bun, resulting in a slightly different texture than the usual cheeseburger. Burger toppings such as condiments, onions, and pickles may be added.

== Other variations ==
Variations of the burger at other restaurants use the same basic preparation procedures but offer different variations in terms of toppings, the burger's filling, and any accompaniments. Some of the best known are Blue Door Pub and The Nook. In 2018, Bon Appétit magazine declared the best Juicy Lucy in Minneapolis-Saint Paul area to be the one served at The Nook. The Crooked Pint in Minneapolis has won both Silver and Gold awards from the Star Tribune since 2021 for "Best Jucy Lucy".

== See also ==
- List of hamburgers
- List of regional dishes of the United States
- List of stuffed dishes
