= 5-8 Club =

Restaurant in Minneapolis, Minnesota

5-8 Club Tavern & Grill
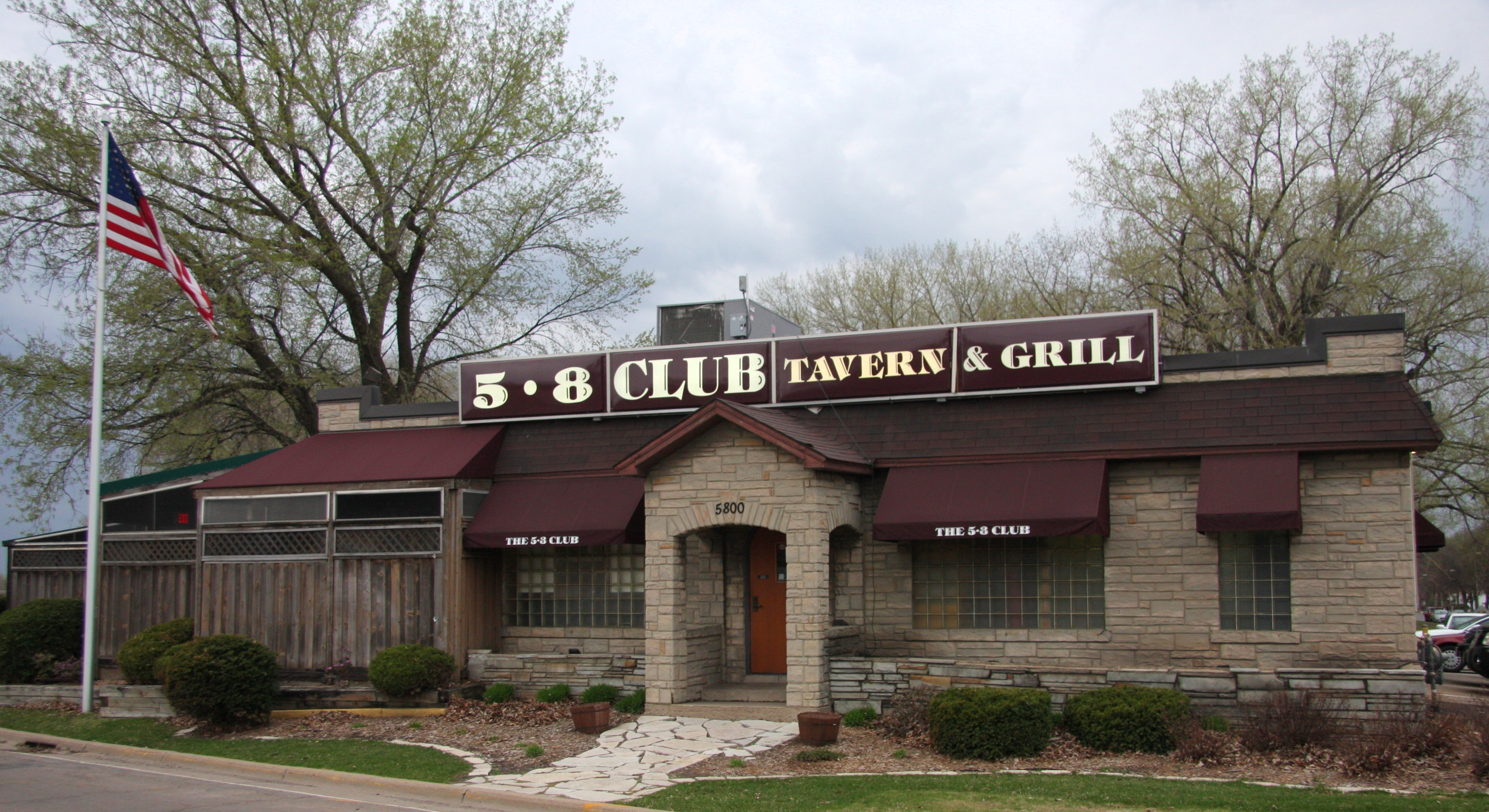
- The facade of the 5-8 Club
- Interactive map of 5-8 Club Tavern & Grill

Restaurant information
- Established: 1928
- Owner: Food Services Inc.
- Food type: American
- Location: 5800 Cedar Avenue South Minneapolis, Minnesota
- Coordinates: 44.8977096°N 93.2478934°W
- Other locations: Maplewood, Champlin, West Saint Paul
- Website: www.5-8club.com

The 5-8 Club Tavern & Grill is a restaurant in Minneapolis, Minnesota. Founded in 1928 as a speakeasy, the eatery is one of two Minneapolis establishments that claim to have invented the Juicy Lucy cheeseburger in the 1950s, the other being Matt's Bar. The 5-8 Club also serves its Saucy Sally burger and other dishes including fried cheese curds and onion straws. The restaurant, which has been featured on several Travel Channel TV series, has three additional locations in Minnesota.

== History ==
The 5-8 Club Tavern & Grill opened in Minneapolis, Minnesota, in 1928 at the intersection of 58th Street and Cedar Avenue, with 58th Street lending its name to the establishment. Founded during the United States' Prohibition Era (1920–1933), the club started illegally as a speakeasy in a stucco-sided residence in a relatively non-urbanized area to the city's south. The club's proprietors built a subterranean garage below the house to aid them in illegally transporting alcohol.

In honor of its past as a speakeasy, the rear entrance to the 5-8 Club remains the main entrance. Three additional 5-8 Club locations have been opened, in Maplewood, Champlin, and West Saint Paul, Minnesota. The restaurant was acquired by Food Services Inc. in 1996.

== Menu ==
=== Juicy Lucy ===
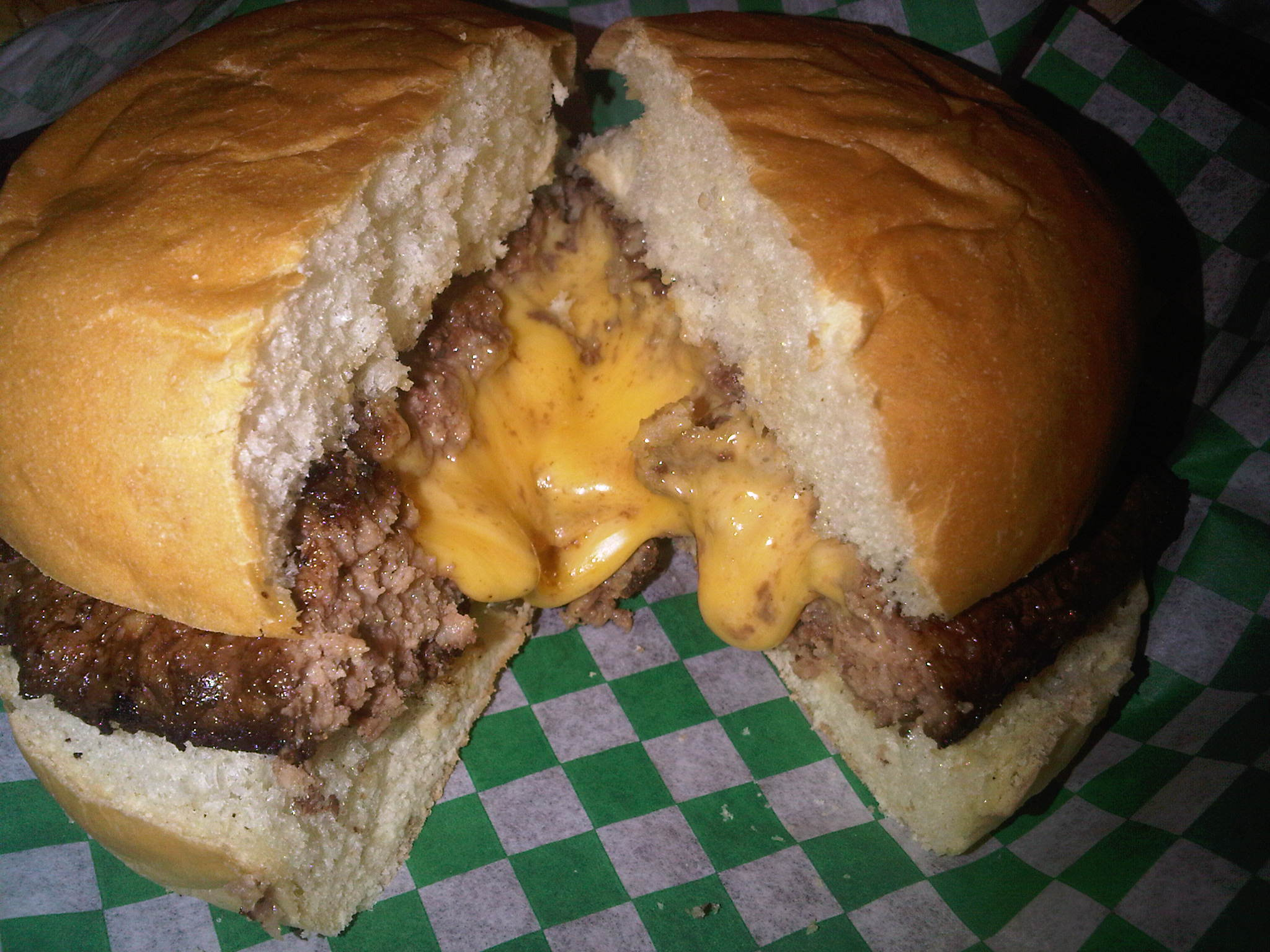
A 5-8 Club Juicy Lucy

The 5-8 Club's signature menu item is its Juicy Lucy cheeseburger which consists of cheese cooked inside a patty of Angus beef. There is contention between the 5-8 Club and Matt's Bar, another Minneapolis eatery located 23 blocks north of the 5-8 Club on Cedar Avenue, about which establishment invented the burger. According to the 5-8 Club, they developed the dish in the 1950s. The version served by the club is spelled Juicy Lucy, while the Matt's Bar iteration omits the letter I, resulting in a spelling of Jucy Lucy.

Unlike Matt's Jucy Lucys, the 5-8 Club's Juicy Lucys are offered with the option of four different cheeses: American, blue, pepper jack, and Swiss. In order to avoid confusion in the preparation process, patties being grilled are tagged with colored toothpicks corresponding to the type of cheese inside. The restaurant serves as many as 300 of the cheeseburgers each day.

Referencing the different spellings of their respective burgers, waitstaff at the 5-8 Club have donned shirts imploring that "If it's spelled right, it's done right." The club sells T-shirts reading "Free the Cheese" in contrast to shirts offered at Matt's that read "Fear the Cheese".

=== Other dishes ===
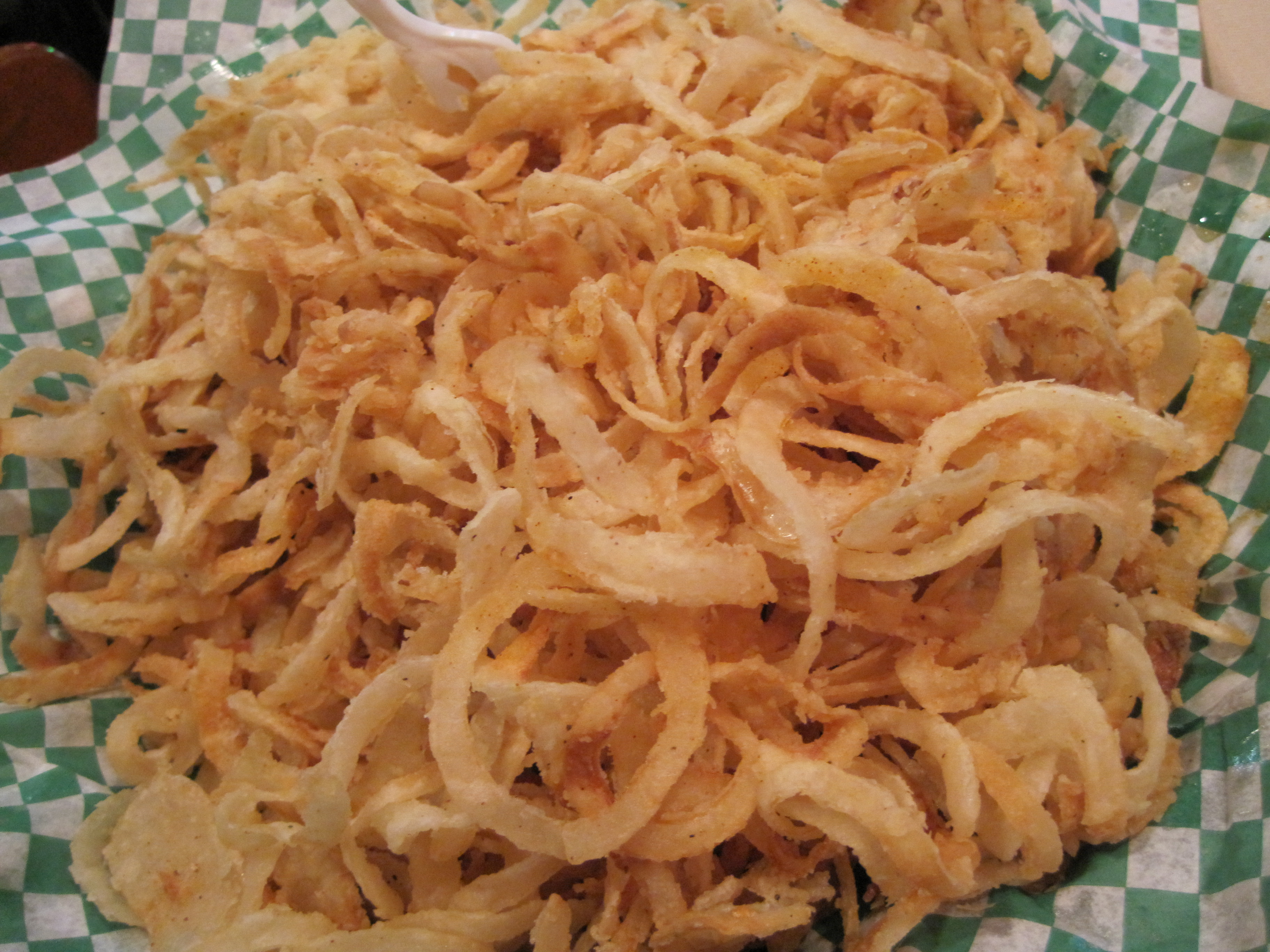
The 5-8 Club's onion straws

In addition to Juicy Lucys, the 5-8 Club serves other dishes, including fried cheese curds, pork tenderloin sandwiches, potato wedges, and onion straws. The Saucy Sally, a variation on the Juicy Lucy consisting of a secret sauce cooked into a beef patty and served with a variety of toppings (onions, cheese, lettuce, and Thousand Island dressing) is served at the eatery. In March 2016, the 5-8 Club began its Brewer's Burger program, allowing a new local craft brewer to develop a limited-time burger–beer pairing each month. The restaurant offers "free refills 'till you float" on beverages.

== Reception ==
Citing the variety of cheeses offered in the patties, George Motz described the 5-8 Club's Juicy Lucys as an upscale version of the dish. Dara Moskowitz Grumdahl described the bar's Juicy Lucy in City Pages as a "big, sizzling, dense, and tender burger filled with good cheese" while Thrillist's Kevin Alexander disagreed, writing that the patty "lacked serious flavor and the cheese didn't burn [his] tongue as much as just surrender en masse on [his] plate after an initial bite." Of the ambiance, Motz wrote that in spite of "its clinical-looking rear entrance", the bar has a "comfortable dining room with a large outdoor patio." James Norton commented that the eatery "has a clean, bright suburban sheen to it more evocative of a well-maintained Applebee's than a hole-in-the-wall tavern" and Alexander compared the restaurant's exterior to "the rectory of a pretty happening church".

The 5-8 Club was ranked first among the 101 restaurants featured on the second season of the Travel Channel's Chowdown Countdown in 2014. The restaurant has also appeared on two other Travel Channel shows: Man v. Food in 2009 and Food Wars in 2010.
