= Matt's Bar =

Restaurant famous for serving Jucy Lucy

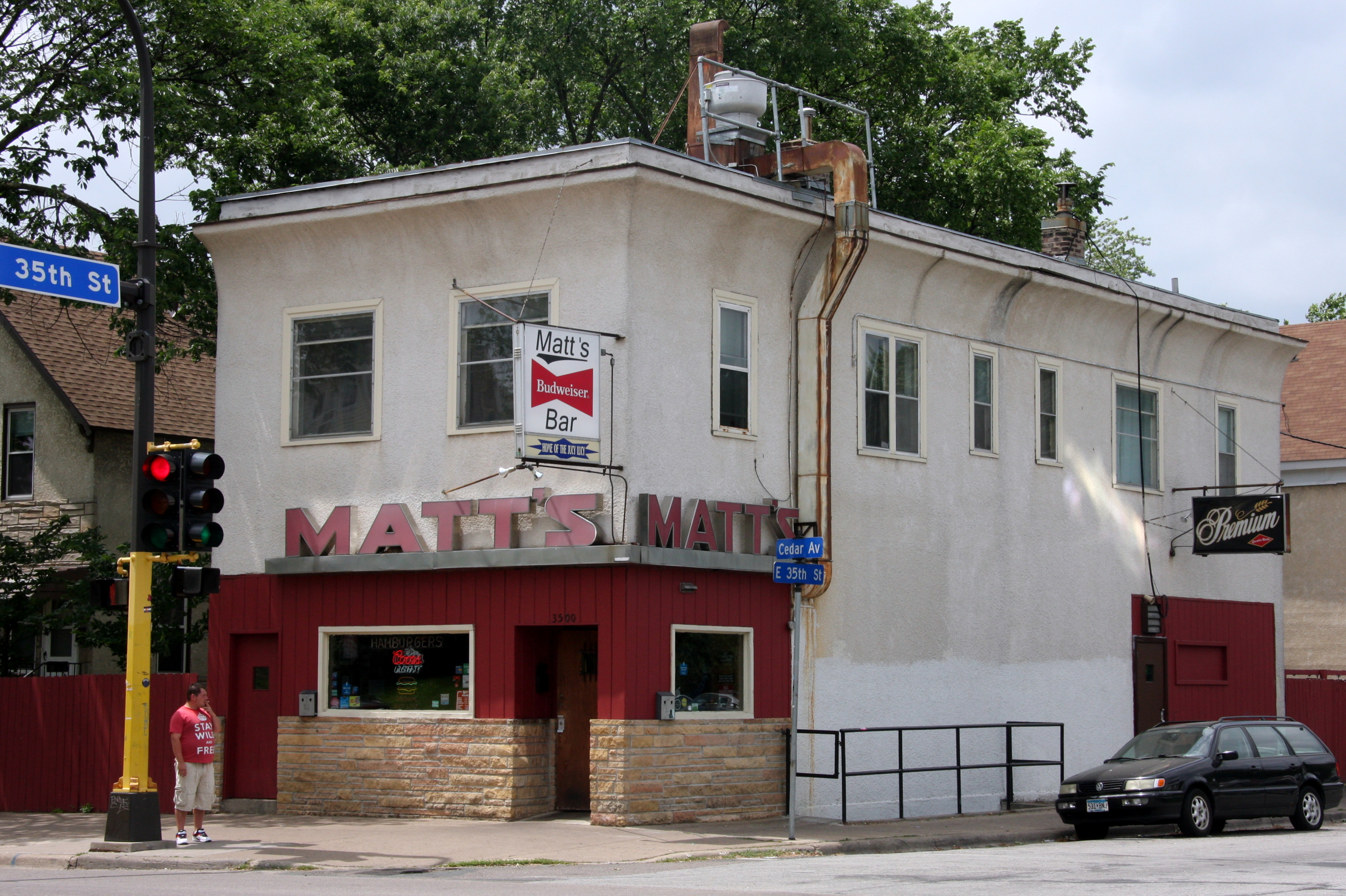
- Matt's Bar in June, 2014
- Interactive map of Matt's Bar

Restaurant information
- Established: 1954
- Owner: Scott Nelson
- Food type: American
- Dress code: Casual
- Location: 3500 Cedar Avenue South Minneapolis, Minnesota, 55407, United States
- Coordinates: 44°56′21.94″N 93°14′51.12″W
- Other information: Founder Matt Bristol
- Website: mattsbar.com

Matt's Bar is a restaurant in south Minneapolis, Minnesota. It is known as one of two businesses that created the Jucy Lucy.

== History ==
The bar was originally named Nibs prior to 1954 and was owned by Nibs Martin, who later purchased the Magic Bar and renamed it Mr. Nibs. Matt Bristol worked at Nibs. It was reopened with the name Matt's Bar in 1954. In 1998 Scott Nelson purchased the bar from the original owner Matt Bristol.

In a 1998 City Pages article, Cheryl Bristol, the daughter of bar founder and namesake Matt Bristol, told of how one day in 1954, a customer asked a cook to put two hamburger patties together and seal up some cheese in the middle. When the customer bit into the sandwich, he was heard to exclaim, "That's one juicy Lucy!"

On June 26, 2014, the bar's original owner, Matt Bristol, died hours before the bar he founded was visited by President Barack Obama.

In 2025 Matt's Bar launched a food truck that sells their famous burgers at various locations around the Twin Cities.

== See also ==
- Blue Door Pub
- List of hamburgers
- Jucy Lucy
- 5-8 Club
