= Mr. Bartley's Burger Cottage =

Restaurant in Cambridge, Massachusetts

Coordinates: 42.37246°N 71.11615°W

Mr. Bartley’s Burger Cottage
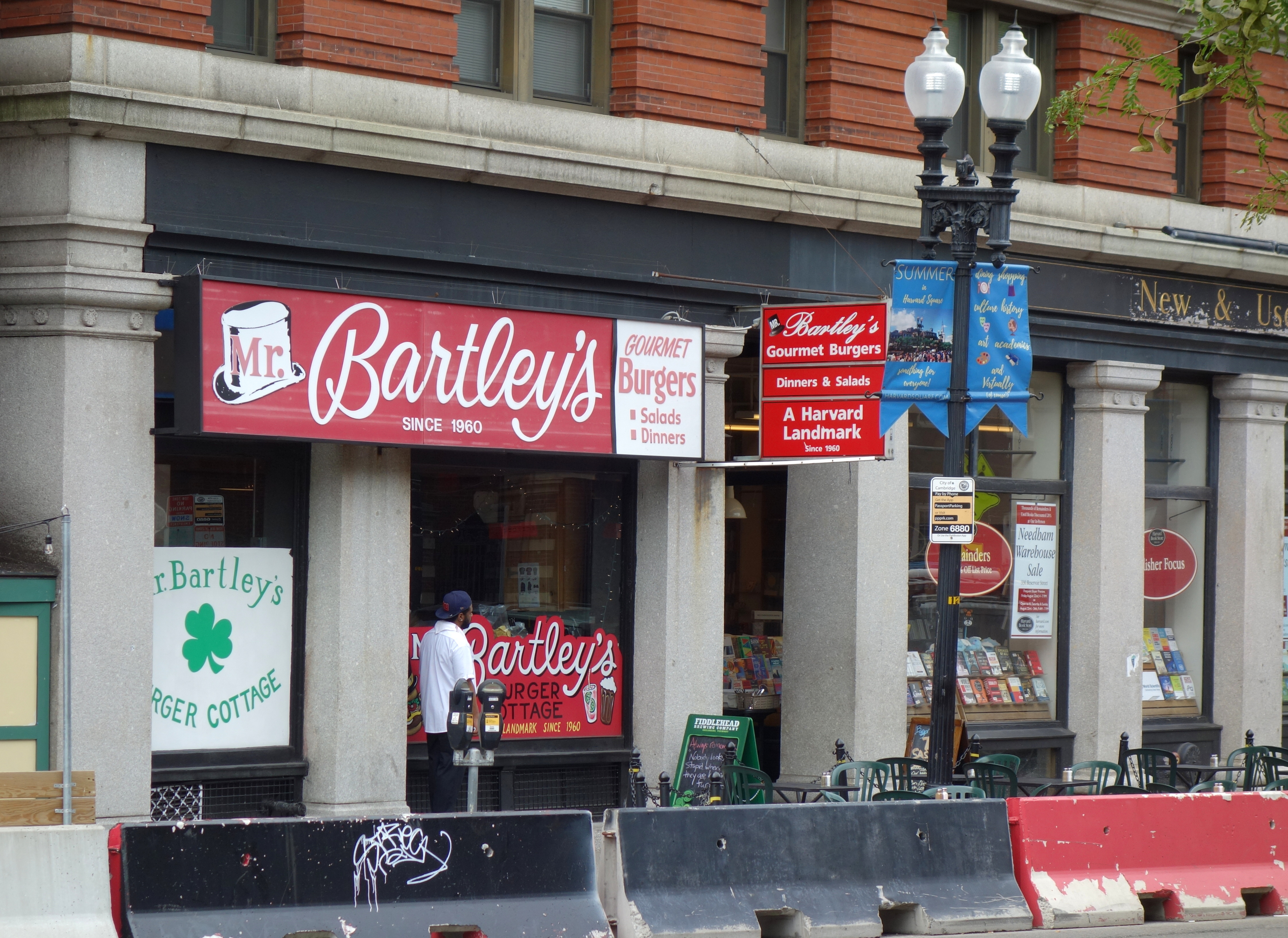
- Interactive map of Mr. Bartley’s Burger Cottage

Restaurant information
- Established: 1960
- Previous owners: Bill, Joan and Joe Bartley
- Food type: Hamburgers
- Dress code: Casual
- Location: 1246 Massachusetts Avenue, Cambridge, Massachusetts, 02138
- Website: www.mrbartley.com

Mr. Bartley's Burger Cottage (also known as Mr. & Mrs. Bartley's Burger Cottage or Bartley's) is a hamburger restaurant across the street from Harvard Yard in Cambridge, Massachusetts. It is known for the wide variety of toppings on its griddle-cooked hamburgers, each with a colorful name, and for its décor reminiscent of a "dorm room", including cheesy slogans, stolen street signs, political ephemera, and so on.

Bartley's was opened by Joseph C. Bartley, nicknamed Mr. B, and his wife Joan in 1960. The location was previously a convenience store. It was bought by Josh Huggard in 2020.

It has appeared on Food Paradise (season 17), Chowdown Countdown, and Diners, Drive-Ins and Dives (season 8, episode 1). It was also a filming location in the movies Good Will Hunting and The Social Network.

Bartley's has seating for 78 indoors and 26 on the sidewalk in good weather.

== Menu ==
Bartley's hamburgers are made of 7 ounces of ground chuck cooked on a 600° griddle.

Bartley's also offers various sandwiches, including fried chicken, turkey, and cod, and salads. The main accompaniments are French fries, sweet potato fries, and onion rings.

Each hamburger combo is named humorously for a celebrity or a topic of current interest; some current or past combos include:

- The Ted Kennedy, a plump, liberal amount of burger.
- The George Bush Jr. (‘not bad for a C student’) combines tangy cheddar and Texas barbecue sauce
- The Snoop Dogg with "Smoked" ghost pepper jack cheese and bacon and...
- The Taxachusetts topped with Boston baked beans, sriracha, bacon, and ...

Until 2023, Bartley's served only non-alcoholic beverages, notably a raspberry lime rickey. It was granted a liquor license in March 2023 and now serves cocktails and draft beer.

== History ==
Joan and Joe Bartley (1930–2018) took over the Harvard Spa in 1960 and by 1962 started focusing on hamburgers.

Customers have included Julian Edelman, Jacqueline Kennedy Onassis, Bob Dylan, Katie Couric, Stephen King, Mindy Kaling, Adam Sandler, and Al Pacino.

The restaurant's landlord is Harvard University and rent negotiations in 2019 were so difficult that they might have had to change their location. During the dispute, they temporarily named one of their hamburgers "Greedy Landlords".

The Bartley family put Bartley's on the market in 2020 so that Bill could retire. Bartley said "he's only interested in a buyer who will keep the restaurant as it is". It was bought by Josh Huggard, a chef and manager of restaurants, in 2020.

== Awards ==
Bartley's was listed as the Best Burger in Boston by Boston Magazine in 2000 (best affordable), 2003, and 2008. It was ranked 9th among the Best Burgers in the U.S.A. by Gayot.com in 2025.

== Legal issues ==
In February 2019, the restaurant and their landlord Harvard University were sued by Andres Melo, who uses a wheelchair, for violating the Americans with Disabilities Act of 1990 since he was unable to enter the restaurant with his wheelchair. Melo filed a notice of settlement on August 9 and the judge dismissed the case.
