= Blue Door Pub =

Restaurant chain in Minnesota, United States

Coordinates: 44°56′48″N 93°10′36.5″W

The Blue Door Pub

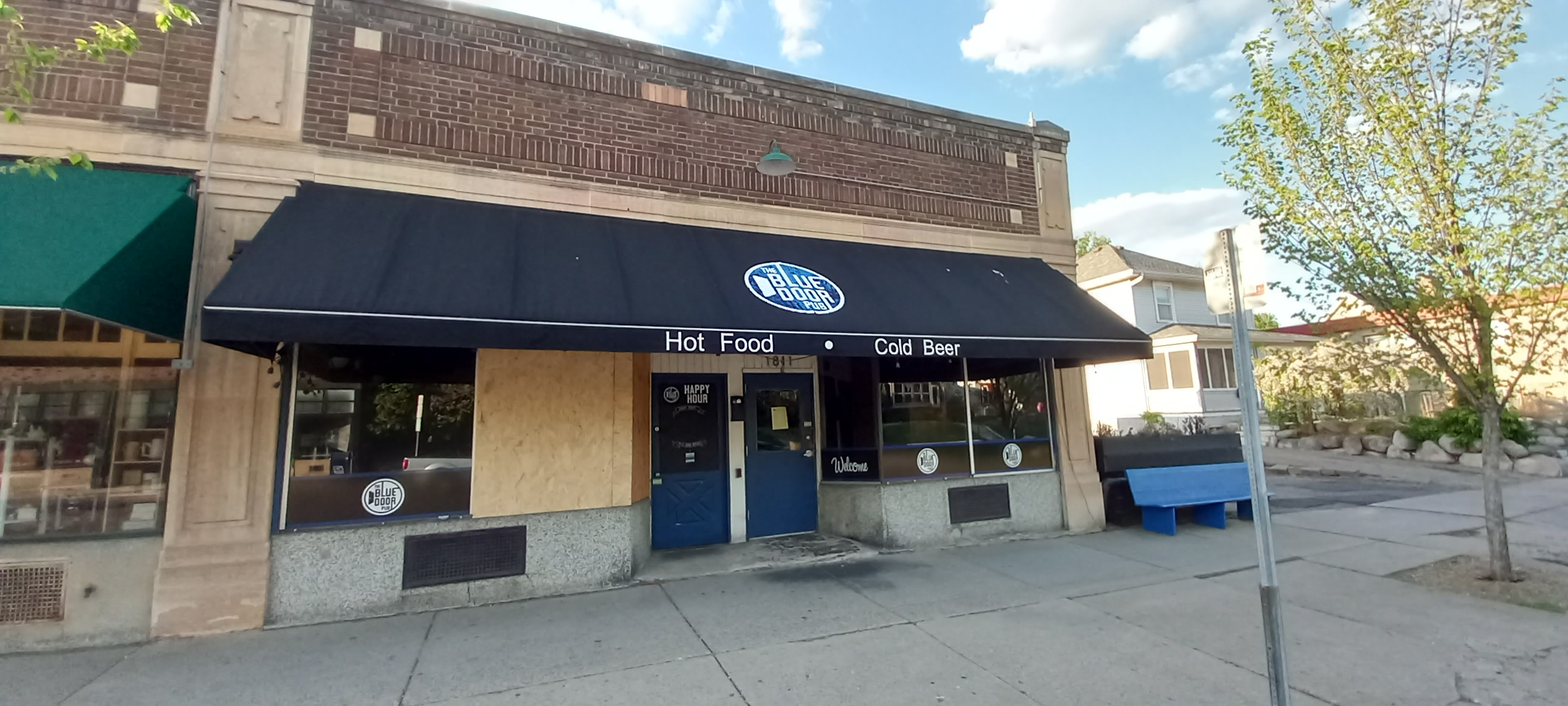
- The original Blue Door Pub at 1811 Selby Ave in May 2021
- Industry: Restaurants
- Genre: Burgers
- Number of locations: 3
- Website: https://thebdp.com

Blue Door Pub is a chain of restaurants in Minnesota. There are currently three locations

It is known for the Blucy, a variant of the Jucy Lucy. The Blue Door has been featured on Food Paradise, Man v. Food, and Diners, Drive-Ins and Dives.

Jeremy Woerner and Pat McDonough opened the first Blue Door Pub in September 2008. The other four locations opened over the next ten years, with the most recent at the airport.

The original Blue Door Pub was located in St. Paul; it closed and did not re-open amidst the COVID-19 pandemic.
