= Martha Lou Gadsden =

American chef (1930–2021)

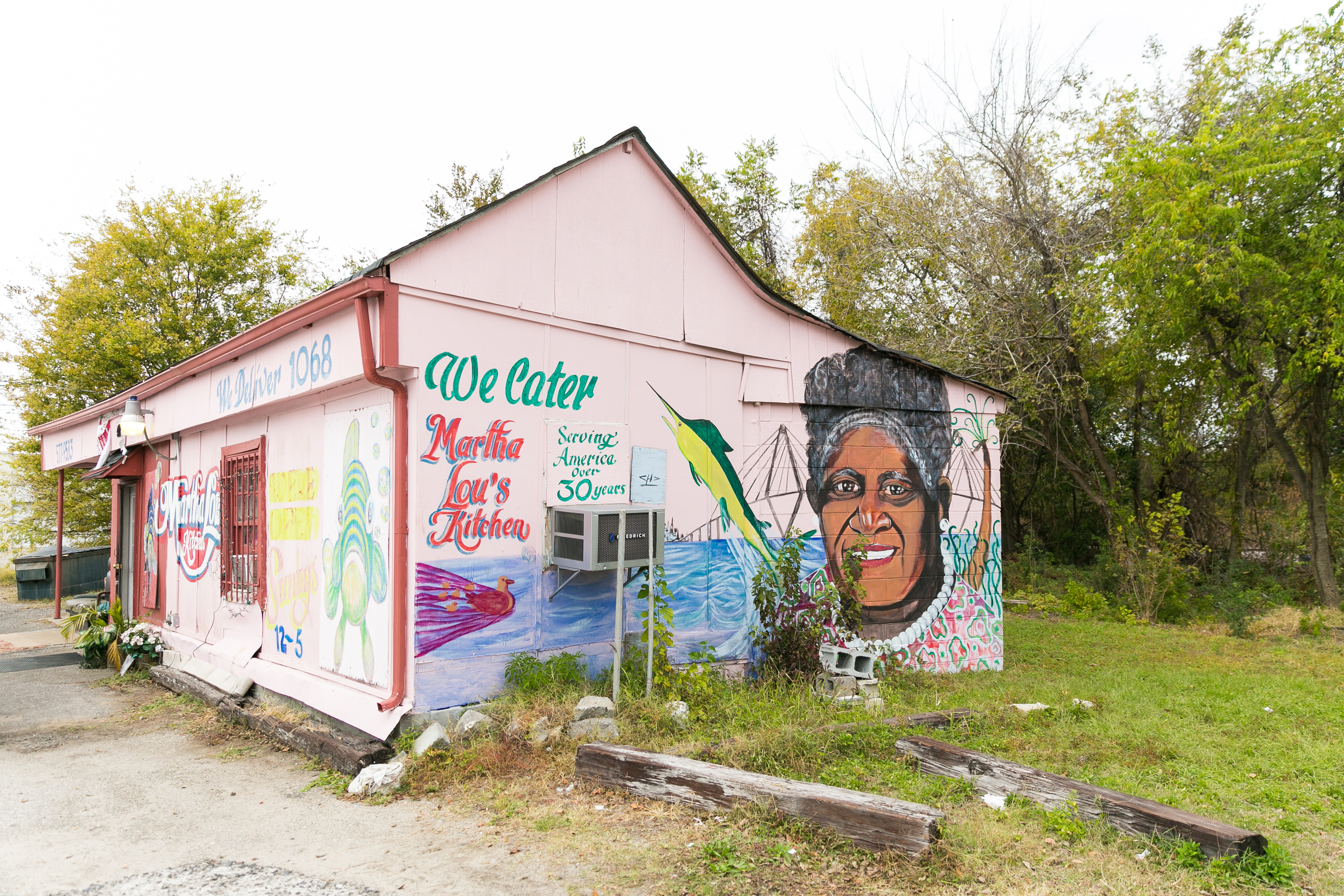
Martha Lou's Kitchen exterior, Charleston, South Carolina, November 10, 2014.

Martha Lou Gadsden (March 20, 1930 – April 1, 2021) was an American chef and restaurateur known for her soul food restaurant Martha Lou's Kitchen in Charleston, South Carolina.

== Early life ==
Gadsden was born in Charleston to Joseph and Lillie Mae Simmons. When she was five years old, her father died. Her mother sent Martha Lou and her two siblings to live with their grandparents in Manning, South Carolina, while she remained in Charleston to work. Martha Lou was introduced to cooking by her grandmother.

== Career ==
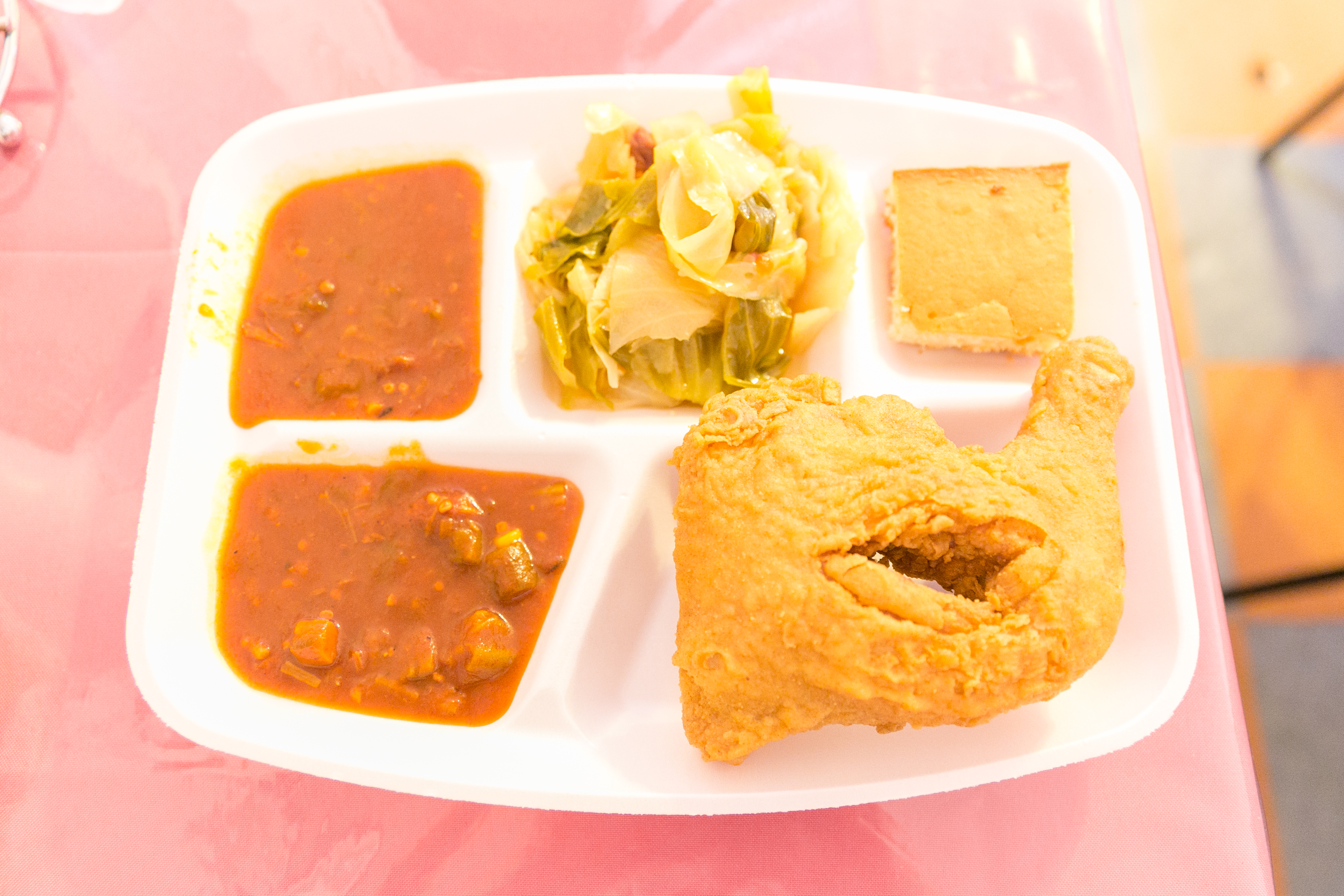
Martha Lou's Kitchen - Fried Chicken with cabbage, lima beans, corn bread, and okra soup

Gadsden opened Martha Lou's Kitchen in 1983. The restaurant operated until September 1, 2020.
