= Slinger (dish) =

American late-night dish

- A slinger, made with two hamburger patties and topped with jalapeños
- Alternative names: American Midwest
- Course: Main course
- Place of origin: United States
- Associated cuisine: United States
- Serving temperature: Hot
- Main ingredients: Two eggs, hash browns, and a hamburger patty (or any other meat) all covered in chili con carne (with or without beans) and generously topped with cheese (cheddar or American) and onions

A slinger is an American Midwest diner specialty typically consisting of two eggs, hash browns, and a ground beef (or other type of meat) patty, all covered in chili con carne (with or without beans) and generously topped with cheese (cheddar or American) and onions. The eggs can be any style. Hot sauce is usually served on the side. The slinger is considered to be a St. Louis late-night culinary original. It is described as "a hometown culinary invention" of a mishmash of meat, hash-fried potatoes, eggs, and chili, sided with a choice of ham, sausage, bacon, hamburger patties, or an entire T-bone steak.

== Variations ==
There are numerous variations of the basic slinger:

- "Top one": has a tamale served on top of the slinger.
- "Vegetarian": uses veggie burgers and veggie chili.
- "The Tobey"/"the Hoosier": slinger that has white gravy instead of chili. (Named after a customer at Tiffany's Original Diner.)
- "Ying and yang": slinger covered in half chili and half gravy. A customer favorite at Tiffany's Original Diner, and named by manager Tom Gray. (The yin and yang is both light and dark in color.)
- "The Jared": slinger with equal amounts of chili and white gravy.
- "The JP slinger": slinger with hamburger patty, extra onions and extra chili.
- "Devil's delight": slinger without the hamburgers patties at Courtesy Diner.
- "Chicago style": served with white bread toast on the side, burgers are specified as "cheeseburger patties", eggs are specified as over easy, and must contain grilled onions.

== See also ==
- Cincinnati chili, a Midwestern style of chili often served piled high
- Garbage Plate, the Rochester, New York-area style plate piled with diner type foods
- Horseshoe sandwich, Springfield, Illinois open-faced sandwich covered with fries and cheese sauce
- Hot hamburger plate, an open-faced sandwich covered with fries and gravy
- Loco moco, Hawaiian dish with many foods served on rice
- Poutine, a Quebec dish, made with French fries, topped with brown gravy and curd cheese
- Cuisine of St. Louis
- List of meat and potato dishes
