= El Tepeyac Café =

Mexican restaurant in Los Angeles, CA, US

- Interactive map of El Tepeyac Café

Restaurant information
- Established: 1942
- Location: California, United States
- Coordinates: 34°2′52″N 118°11′51.5″W

El Tepeyac Café, or simply El Tepeyac, is a longstanding Mexican restaurant in the Boyle Heights neighborhood of East Los Angeles.

== History ==
El Tepeyac Café is a Mexican food restaurant that was founded in 1942 by the Rojas family. It was originally named El Tupinamba Café and was located near downtown Los Angeles. The family later relocated to the Lincoln Heights area, just north of Boyle Heights, and opened a restaurant, La Villa Café. In 1952, the Rojas family relocated the restaurant to Boyle Heights, the current location of El Tepeyac Café.

After the death of his grandfather, Salvador Rojas, Manuel Rojas took over El Tepeyac Café.

The restaurant sells a five-pound burrito, "Manuel’s Special Burrito", as part of Manuel’s Burrito Challenge.

The restaurant's "Hollenbeck Burrito" is said that this burrito was created specifically for LAPD officers, from the local Hollenbeck Division, who often frequented El Tepeyac.

In 2009, there was concern over whether or not the restaurant would stay open due to land leasing issues.

The Rojas family opened a second location near the City of Industry in 2011.

El Tepeyac’s owner, Manuel Rojas, died of esophageal cancer on February 12, 2013 at age 79.

In September 2020, Manuel's grandson Carlos Thome opened a second El Tepeyac Cafe location in Pasadena.

== On television ==
On February 18, 2009, El Tepeyac Cafe was featured in the Travel Channel’s show Man vs. Food.

On July 24, 2014, El Tepeyac Cafe was featured on Esquire TV’s show, Best Bars in America.

On January 15, 2017, El Tepeyac Cafe was featured on the Travel Channel’s show, Food Paradise. The episode in which it was featured is called “Best Mex.”
