= Home fries =

Potato dish

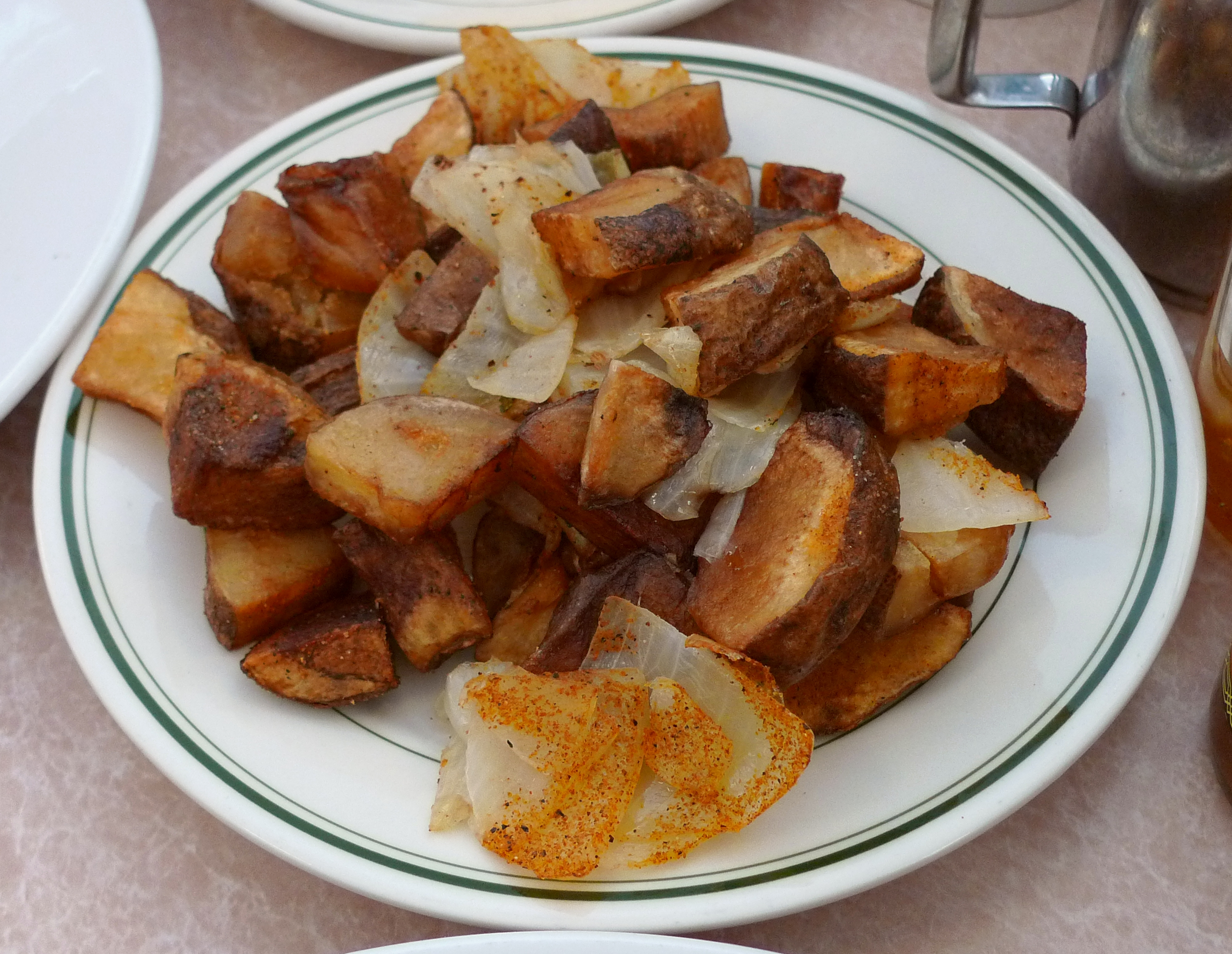
- A plate of home fried potatoes, showing the irregular size and texture of the potato dish
- Alternative names: House fries, country potatoes, sometimes American fries
- Main ingredients: Potatoes, vegetable oil or butter

Home fries (US, Canada), house fries (US), fried potatoes (UK, Canada and regional US), Bratkartoffeln (German), or bistro potatoes (southeastern US) is a type of basic potato dish made by pan- or skillet-frying chunked, sliced, wedged or diced potatoes that are sometimes unpeeled and may have been par-cooked by boiling, baking, steaming, or microwaving. They are sometimes served as a substitute for hash browns.

Home fries (or fried potatoes) are often paired with onions.

In North America, home fries are popular as a breakfast side dish.

== See also ==
- Bauernfrühstück
- Garbage Plate
- German fries
- French fries
- Hash browns
- List of deep fried foods
- List of potato dishes
- Lyonnaise potatoes
- Potatoes O'Brien
- Tater tots – grated potato formed into small cylinders and deep-fried
- Waffle fries
