= Man v. Food season 1 =

Man v. Food
- Season 1
- Season 1 DVD Cover
- No. of episodes: 18

Release
- Original network: Travel Channel
- Original release: December 3, 2008 – March 25, 2009

Season chronology
- Next → Season 2

The first season of Man v. Food, an American food reality television series hosted by Adam Richman on the Travel Channel, premiered on December 3, 2008. The series debuted with back-to-back new episodes airing for the first two weeks then settling down to a pattern of one new episode followed by one repeat episode. First-run episodes of the series aired in the United States on the Travel Channel on Wednesdays at 10:00 PM Eastern time. Man v. Food was executive produced by Matt Sharp, in association with the Travel Channel. The season contains 18 episodes and concluded airing on March 25, 2009.

The first season of Man v. Food was hosted by actor and food enthusiast Adam Richman. In each episode, Richman explores the "big food" of a different American city before facing off against a pre-existing eating challenge at a local restaurant. Over the course of the first season, the final record wound up at 11 wins for "Man" and 7 wins for "Food".

== Reception ==
=== Ratings ===
The first season of Man v. Food was initially picked up for 10 episodes and then, after initial ratings success, an additional 8 episodes were ordered. The Los Angeles Times noted that the Travel Channel received its highest-ever ratings for a new debut with Man v. Food. They highlighted the show as an example of other networks moving in on the traditional turf of the Food Network.

=== Critical reaction ===
CityPages Minneapolis/St. Paul describes the show, "...like the food version of Jackass, with host Adam Richman as its very own Steve-O". In the Star-Ledger, television critic Alan Sepinwall wrote: "It ain't deep, and it certainly ain't healthy (I could feel my arteries clog just from watching), but it's fun". Features reporter Thomas Rozwadowski of the Green Bay Press-Gazette said that "playfully eager host Adam Richman has won me over" and that "it's all in good fun".

== Episodes ==
Episode	Episode Number	Original Air Date	Winner
Amarillo, TX	01	December 3, 2008	Man
The Big Texan Steak Ranch Adam began his cross-country eating expedition as he journeyed down Route 66 to Amarillo, the beef capital of the world and home to over 1,000,000 head of cattle. He first visit was to Coyote Bluff that is known among locals as having the best burgers in town. Their best known burger in particular is the extra-spicy "Burger From Hell". They offer garlic fried mushrooms, chili cheese fries and 10 distinct burgers. All the burgers are seasoned and grilled on both sides and then cooked by Coyote Bluff's unique steaming method, covered by a bowl cap. For the Hell Burger, each 8 ounce burger is then covered in a cup of grilled jalapenos, homemade habanero sauce and spicy cayenne pepper sauce. It is covered in shredded cheddar and mozzarella cheese and everything is steamed together. To make the cheese fries two pounds of freshly cut potatoes are covered in a pound of shredded cheese and green chili sauce and put into the cheese melter. For his second visit, he ventured to Youngblood's Stockyard Café, right down the hall from the Amarillo Stockyard Auction, to try their authentic chicken fried steak. A seven ounce beef cutler is put through the beef tenderizer before being seasoned with salt and pepper. it is then soaked in a wash of 15 eggs and a gallon of buttermilk. After dredging it in simple flour, it is fried on the grill with clarified butter instead of being deep fried. It is then served with homemade mashed potatoes and country gravy. This episode's challenge was to complete the Big Texan Challenge at The Big Texan Steak Ranch. The challenge included a 72 ounce (2 kg) steak, a baked potato, a shrimp cocktail, a salad, and a dinner roll, all of which had to be eaten in under an hour. The top sirloin had been dry aged for over a week was seasoned on the grill by a proprietary blend of sea salt, garlic, black pepper, dill and other secret spices. Before the challenge begins, they are allowed one bite to make sure it is to their liking. Accompanied by members of the Route 66 Roller Derby League, Adam approached the challenge by eating the steak first where they are not required to eat the fat and gristle. That was followed by the shrimp cocktail and salad, leaving the potato and roll for last. Despite some struggles halfway, Adam completed the challenge in just 29-1/2 minutes. For the win, he was awarded a commemorative t-shirt, the price of the meal waived, and his name placed on the Wall of Fame (approximately 1 in 6 challengers finish in an hour). Local press coverage places the taping of this challenge on September 29, 2008. Post-episode update: In 2013, Youngblood's Café moved from the Stockyards to its current location after a lease dispute with its landlords, the Amarillo Livestock Auction. It also dropped the Stockyard portion of its name due to a lawsuit over the relocation and lease dispute.
Memphis, TN	02	December 3, 2008	Food
Adam traveled to Memphis for the spicy fried chicken at Gus's World Famous Fried Chicken. All of the excess fat is cut off each piece of chicken by hand. Each piece of chicken is then dipped in a 50-year-old secret blend of spices before being deep fried. Adam then tried the ribs and pulled pork at Charlie Vergos's Rendezvous. They are one of the most legendary purveyors of dry ribs in the world. Memphis is known for saucing their ribs. But, Rendezvous coats theirs with dry seasonings. Their founder, Greek immigrant Charlie Vergos, added a proprietary blend of Mediterranean spices to the dry seasonings. Each rack of ribs is broiled over charcoal for up to 14 hours. This episode's challenge was to eat the 7.5-pound Sasquatch Hamburger, which included 4 pounds of beef (equal to eight regular sized burgers), 1.5 pounds of toppings (including a whole onion, a whole tomato, 1-1/2 cups of pickles, lettuce and eight slices of cheese), and a 2-pound bun in an hour at Big Foot Lodge. Adam also became the first competitor to add bacon and mushrooms to his burger. Adam's strategy was to cut the burger into six sections and eat each one within 10 minutes. While he started strong, eating half of the burger within the first 20 minutes, the burger proved to be too much for Adam and he eventually gave up with 13 minutes to go, with a quarter of the burger still left. According to the restaurant's website, this challenge was taped on August 1, 2008. This was the first episode taped for this season. As of December 2008, only 5 people have successfully completed the challenge. Post-episode update: In mid-December, just two weeks after this episode aired, the names of Big Foot Lodge and the Sasquatch Burger were changed to Kooky Canuck and the Kookamonga, respectively.
Pittsburgh, PA	03	December 10, 2008	Man
Primanti Brothers Adam ventured to Pittsburgh and Primanti Brothers for huge sandwiches served with the fries and cole slaw inside then Deluca's Restaurant for big omelettes and plate-sized chocolate chip pancakes. This episode's challenge was to complete the Atomic Hot Wings challenge at Quaker Steak & Lube by consuming 6 "Atomic" chicken wings doused in a 150,000 Scoville unit sauce. Adam warmed himself up by eating an assortment of other wings, with progressively hotter sauces, before taking on the Atomic wings. Adam completed the challenge and was awarded a commemorative bumper sticker and a place on Quaker Steak & Lube's "Atomic Wall of Flame". The "liability waiver" Adam signed before eating the wings was dated October 19. This is the first challenge on Man v. Food not to have a time limit.
Columbus, OH	04	December 10, 2008	Man
The Thurmanator Adam went to Columbus, Ohio, to visit Schmidt's Sausage Haus for cream puffs and an all-you-can-eat sausage buffet called "The Autobahn," plus the Thurman Cafe for an enormous burger dubbed "The Thurman Burger". Mentioned, but not eaten, was the even larger "Thurmanator". This episode's challenge was to eat the 2.5-pound Dagwood Sandwich challenge and a pound of fries in 30 minutes at the Ohio Deli & Restaurant. The sandwich consisted of 21 ounces (1 pound, 5 ounces) of three different cold meats and 19 ounces (1 pound, 3 ounces) of toppings. Before facing the challenge, he psyched himself up with a fantasy sequence involving the Ohio State Buckeyes mascot and cheerleaders at Ohio Stadium. Adam completed the challenge in just 20 of the allotted 30 minutes and was awarded a commemorative t-shirt. As of December 2008, about 400 of the more than 1,000 challengers to date have completed the challenge. Post-episode update: According to news accounts, the Ohio Deli & Restaurant burned down on December 30, 2014.
Austin, TX	05	December 17, 2008	Food
Adam headed west to the Texas Hill Country to make and devour giant doughnuts at Round Rock Donuts in Round Rock and sample the meats from the open pit at The Salt Lick barbecue restaurant in Driftwood. This episode's challenge was to eat 8 of the three-quarter-pound Don Juan El Taco Grande breakfast tacos and beat the record of 7 at Juan in a Million in Austin, Texas. The tacos totaled up to 6 pounds, and each taco consisted of potatoes, eggs, cheese, and bacon all wrapped in a tortilla. This challenge had no time limit, but Adam only finished 4.25 of the tacos; however, he was nonetheless rewarded with a commemorative t-shirt and posting of his name and photo on the "Juan of Fame" as the first "Celebrity Champ" and one of the top five all-time eaters. Local press coverage puts the filming of this challenge on September 25, just before the Amarillo challenge. The date on the posted photo was September 25.
Chicago, IL	06	December 24, 2008	Man
A Gino's East deep dish pizza Adam traveled to Chicago to visit Al's Beef for Italian beef sandwiches and Gino's East for deep dish pizza. At Al's Beef, after learning the official "Italian stance" for eating such a juicy sandwich, Adam completed a double-meat, double-cheese Reuben sandwich in under 30 minutes. This episode's main challenge was to eat 3 1.5-pound overstuffed sandwiches in an hour at Lucky's Sandwich Company. Lucky's is named for "Lucky" Charlie Weeghman who once owned a part of the Chicago Cubs and built what is now called Wrigley Field although the restaurant itself is in no way connected to the descendants of Lucky Charlie Weeghman or to the Chicago Cubs. Adam completed the challenge in 25 minutes and became just the 11th person to have his photo posted on the Wall of Fame.
Atlanta, GA	07	January 7, 2009	Food
Adam traveled to Atlanta, where he went to college, to visit Gladys Knight & Ron Winans' Chicken & Waffles for homemade food, plus Vortex Bar and Grill for their famous burgers. Adam spent time in the kitchen with Gladys Knight (he described himself as a "white Pip") making a chicken and waffles plate named "The Midnight Train" in honor of the song Knight made famous. This episode's challenge was to eat a 2.5-foot, 11-pound Carnivore Challenge Pizza in one hour at Big Pie in the Sky Pizzeria (located in Kennesaw, Georgia) without having the pizza leave the body. The pizza consisted of 6 pounds of crust and sauce plus 5 pounds of pepperoni, ground beef, Italian sausage, ham, and bacon. Because the pizza is so large, the restaurant has set this as a two-person challenge. Adam recruited Drew Middlebrooks, who previously came close to beating the challenge until his partner gave up, to help him. With a $250 cash prize on the line, Adam finished most of his half of the pizza, but Drew eventually vomited most of his half pizza with 16 minutes to go, losing the challenge for them both. At the time of this episode's taping, the challenge had never been successfully completed by anyone; later in 2009, it was beaten for the first time by Erik Unger and Anthony Reganato. Post-episode update: According to news reports, Gladys Knight Chicken & Waffles changed their name to World Famous Chicken & Waffles after a legal dispute between the famous singer and her son, who owned the restaurant. The restaurants were later closed for good after the restaurants failed multiple health inspections.
Boston, MA	08	January 14, 2009	Food
Adam journeyed to Boston to visit the East Coast Grill & Raw Bar for seafood and a super-spicy feast dubbed "Hell Night" and The Barking Crab for a four-pound clambake as well as the "Fisherman's Platter" of fried seafood. This episode's challenge was to complete the Eagle's Challenge in an hour at Eagle's Deli and Restaurant. Boston magazine awarded Eagle's Deli their "Best of Boston 2006 Burger" honor and the Travel Channel named it one of the "World's Best Places to Pig Out". The challenge included a 5-pound burger with 20 slices each of bacon and cheese, 5 pounds of fries, and a giant pickle. Adam, a self-proclaimed New York Yankees fan, competed against a former Eagle's employee, Chuck Whittall, a Boston Red Sox fan (he even got help from Red Sox first baseman Kevin Youkilis). Chuck finished 6 ounces more of his burger and fries than Adam, who was forced to wear an "I Love Boston" shirt and got his picture on the Wall of Shame (had he won, Chuck would have been forced to wear an "I Love New York" shirt). Local press reports as well as a sign that can be seen at East Coast Grill & Raw Bar place the taping of this episode in late October 2008. As of January 2009, more than 1,500 have tried but no one person has successfully completed the Challenge Burger. The challenge was later completed by Furious Pete (and in his honor it was renamed as the "Furious Pete" burger). In a March 2009 interview, after the end of season one, Adam contested his loss over issues of portion size and the preparation of the burgers while noting that Chuck was "not a noble contestant". Post-episode update: According to the Boston eating guide Boston.Eater.com, East Coast Grill and Raw Bar closed for good in December 2017.
New York, NY	09	January 21, 2009	Man
Sylvia's Restaurant of Harlem Adam went home to New York City to visit Katz's Delicatessen for their famous deli sandwiches. Adam highlighted their pastrami and corned beef sandwiches. More than 6,000 pounds of pastrami are smoked there every week. After the nearly two-day smoking process Katz's adds salt, black pepper, paprika and coriander. Katz's also brines a brisket for a full month turning it into their corned beef. Adam tried a sandwich on rye bread with both meats, topping it off with swiss chees, sauerkraut and Russian dressing. Next, he went to Sylvia's Restaurant of Harlem for homemade soul food. Opened in 1962, Sylvia's is known for their fried chicken and waffles and their spicy bbq ribs. The chicken is seasoned for over 24 hours before being floured and deep fried. The ribs are marinated for over a full day and then brushed with their homemade bbq sauce and baked. This episode's challenge was to eat Spicy P'haal, claimed to be "the hottest curry in the world", at Brick Lane Curry House and be added to the restaurant's "P'hall of Fame". The owner of Brick Lane warned Adam that one time during the challenge, a contestant actually got a nosebleed, and the head chef advised Adam to wear a gas mask to watch the preparation of the curry, since it had a strong, spicy smell and consisted of 10 different chilies, including habaneros, Thai chili peppers, and white chili powder. This challenge had no time limit. Despite the pain from the curry (Adam made the mistake of wiping his face with the napkin he used to wipe his mouth), Adam finished it and was awarded a free beer, a certificate of completion, and his picture on the restaurant's website. Post-episode update: According to news reports, Brick Lane Curry House closed their Manhattan location in December 2024 after operating in the East Village for 23 years without the owners giving a reason. They did hint at a reopening with a different version of the restaurant. Their Jersey City location remains open.
New Orleans, LA	10	January 28, 2009	Man
Adam traveled to New Orleans to visit Mother's Restaurant. Opened in 1938, they are known for serving traditional Louisiana fare such as Étouffée and the gulf coast staple po' boy sandwich. He was there to try the "Ferdi Special", a sandwich filled with baked ham, roast beef and "debris" (beef cooked in stock for 13 hours, separated and then returned to its gravy to simmer until it forms a chunky, sauce like topping). The ham is baked in a coating of brown sugar, root beer and secret spices. Mayonnaise, creole mustard and yellow mustard are spread on half of a french roll before adding shredded cabbage and the debris. He then visited Deanie's Seafood, known for their seafood such as blue legged crab, crawfish and shrimp, which can be steamed or deep fried. They are most famous though for their barbecued shrimp. The jumbo gulf shrimp are sauteed in a mixture of olive oil and compound butter, flavored with garlic, sweet basil, paprika, cayenne and other spices, and onions. This episode's challenge was to eat 180 oysters in an hour at Acme Oyster House and join the "15 Dozen Club". To prep himself, Adam visited a voodoo queen, who gave Adam a bag of magic powder, telling him to sprinkle it on the oysters, and he would be able to accomplish the challenge. Acme was opened in 1910 and on average sells over 1,000 oysters a day, which can be served straight out of the shell, on a cracker, covered in cocktail sauce and be grilled or fried. Adam learned to properly shuck an oyster from Acme's master shucker. Between the 15 and 20 minute mark Adam started to struggle with the decadence of the oyster texture. But, ultimately, Adam was able to finish the challenge in 41 minutes and he became the 29th member of the "15 Dozen Club". As of the time of the taping in December, only 28 of the 150 people who had attempted this challenge had succeeded.
Portland, OR	11	February 4, 2009	Man
Adam journeyed to Portland, Oregon, to visit the historic Stepping Stone Cafe, known for their huge breakfast portions and their 13-inch pancakes known as "mancakes." They also serve a two-pound omlette known as the Bad Ass Omelet that is filled with chicken fried streak, hashbrowns, onions, jalapeno peppers and cheddar cheese inside three jumbo eggs and smothered with sausage gravy. The mancakes can be offered as whole wheat, buttermilk and pumpkin. He next visited Voodoo Doughnut which features more than 70 varieties of doughnut, including a maple bacon bar with real bacon on top and a peanut butter, chocolate and banana fritter known as Memphis Mafia. While at Voodoo Doughnut, Adam prepared their signature Voodoo doughnut (a human shaped doughnut filled with raspberry jam and covered in chocolate frosting) and witnessed a wedding held in the shop. This episode's challenge was to complete the Great Balls of Fire Challenge in 5 minutes at Salvador Molly's, which serves international far from Africa, Cuba and Indonesia. Adam had to down five habanero chili cheese fritters with a side of habanero salsa. After psyching himself up dressed as a pirate in a fantasy sequence, Adam completed the challenge and got his picture on the "Wall of Flame". At the time the episode was filmed, only 50 of the 1,000 that attempted this challenge succeeded. Adam stated in an interview that he believed he acquired habanero poisoning after the challenge was over. A press release from Salvador Molly's states the challenge was taped on December 9, 2008.
Seattle, WA	12	February 11, 2009	Food
Adam traveled to Seattle for a December 13 stop at Red Mill Burgers for a double bacon deluxe cheeseburger with mill sauce (a smoky flavored mayonaise) and onion rings that were voted best in the country,. He also tried the Verde Burger, topped with jack cheese and roasted Anaheim peppers. Then, he stopped at the Pike Place Fish Market before heading to the Crab Pot in Seattle's historic waterfront district for their signature Alaskan Seafeast of clams, mussels, shrimp, andouille sausage, corn and red potatoes plus dungeness, snow and king crab. Food is not served on plates, but overflowing bowls are dumped right on your table. The episode's challenge took place at Beth's Cafe, in which Adam went up against the "Southwestern Exposure" 12-egg omelet. The omelet, filled with chili, sour cream, salsa and cheese, weighed 5 pounds and was served on a pizza tray with a side of hashbrowns and toast. On average, only one person in 10 is able to complete the challenge and win a Beth's Cafe t-shirt. This challenge was complicated by the addition of a race against local competitor Adam Houghton, who had previously completed the challenge. In the end, "East Coast Adam" (Richman) beat out "West Coast Adam" (Houghton), although neither were able to completely finish the challenge, with Richman unable to finish the last "2-3 bites".
Los Angeles, CA	13	February 18, 2009	Man
Philippe the Original Adam traveled to Los Angeles to visit at Philippe the Original near Union Station. Considered to be the birthplace of the French dip sandwich, Philippe's offers roast beef, pork, turkey or lamb sandwiches that can be dunked in the juices of the meat. The meat is all baked on a bed of mirepoix (celery, carrots and onions) whose flavors permeate the meat. The drippings from the meat are simmered with more mirepoix and beef stock to make the au jus. Adam also helped Philippe's make a batch of their homemade mustard. He next ventured to El Tepeyac Café in Boyle Heights, where the owner greeted him with a large shot of tequila, to take on the Manuel's Special, a five pound burrito of chili verde, rice, beans, and fresh guacamole wrapped in two burritos and covered in shredded cheese and more chili verde. Their version of chili verde is a mixture of deep fried pork shoulder, onions and green chilis simmered in tomatoes. The episode's main challenge was to finish a serving of the "Special No. 2", a ramen soup consisting of six spoonfuls of a special secret spice mix and chopped jalapeño peppers, in 30 minutes at Orochon Ramen in Little Tokyo. To beat the challenge, one has to finish the whole bowl within 30 minutes. Known for their hot ramen soups, Orochon Ramen assigns one of seven heat levels to each bowl of soup. Additionally, there are two special levels that take the heat levels even higher. For motivation, Adam happens upon the fire dancers of Sirena Serpentina and joins them in their fire-dancing. For the challenge, two of the fire dancers joined Adam. He focused on consuming the contents of the ramen soup, leaving only the highly spicy broth for last, which he then drank, despite the hot pain. Adam completed the challenge (while the two fire dancers were unable to finish their bowls) and was awarded a place on the "Wall of Bravery". The Los Angeles Times reports that Adam was in town in late January.
St. Louis, MO	14	February 25, 2009	Food
Adam journeyed to "The Gateway to the West" in St. Louis, Missouri, to take on the sights and the sounds of The Show Me State. He first visited Iron Barley to try oak-roasted pork loin and a Monte Cristo hot dog. The average pork loin weighs 15-16 pounds and is so big that is roasted over oak in the back yard of the restaurant. A saw zaw is used to separate the bone from the heart of the meat. The pork loin is then split, rubbed with a secret spice blend and tied for roasting over a bed of oak wood. For the Monte Cristo dog, two hot dogs are butterflied and fried on the grill. They are then covered with two slices of swiss cheese and steamed under a pie pan with chicken stock. Strawberry jam is then spread on a pair of fried hot dog buns and then topped with the steamed hot dogs. He then tried the "Big Ben" meal at Pappy's Smokehouse which includes a full slab of ribs, brisket and pulled pork sandwiches, a quarter-chicken, and cole slaw, baked beans, sweet potato fries and deep fried corn on the cob. The restaurant uses a dry rub of 18 different spices to cover its meats which are smoked over apple and cherry wood. Pappys sells over 7,500 pounds of meat a week and closes when they sell out each day. Adam also tried a Frito Pie. It can be ordered with any meat on a bed of Fritos and Adam chose a hot link. It is then covered in chili, shredded cheese and red onions. Local press reports state this taping took place on December 18, 2008. The episode's challenge was to drink five 24-ounce malts in 30 minutes at Crown Candy Kitchen, totaling up to 7.5 pounds, a challenge offered by the restaurant since 1913 as the "5 Malt Challenge". The milkshakes, which consist of three scoops of homemade ice cream each, with the customer choosing the flavor, milk, and malt powder, were divided into 15 8-ounce glasses. Adam prepared for the "cold" challenge with some heat, first sitting in a sauna, then consuming a flaming drink, and then watching a burlesque show, before going to see how Crown Candy made their ice cream. For his choice of five ice cream flavors, Adam went with two vanilla, one coffee, one mocha (a combination of coffee and chocolate), and one eggnog. Adam started strong, but he ended up having to vomit in the provided trash can after drinking 12 out of the 15 glasses, resulting in a disqualification. Later, in the Washington D.C. episode, Adam admitted that his decision to have different flavors of ice cream for the challenge worked against him. As a result of this episode, Pappy's Smokehouse reported a spike in traffic on their website and increased business from the national exposure, even on Ash Wednesday. Pappy's added a dish to their menu named "The Adam Bomb" in his honor which was seen in the episode. Post-episode update: According to news reports, Iron Barley closed their St. Louis location in 2017 and moved to a Jefferson County location. The restaurant permanently closed in 2022 after the death of its owner and the building was filled with a new eating establishment.
San Jose, CA	15	March 4, 2009	Man
Adam traveled to San Jose, California, where he visited Iguana's Taqueria and Henry's World Famous Hi-Life. Iguana's is the home of "BurritoZilla", a 5-pound (2.3 kg), 1.5-foot (46 cm) burrito that takes three 14-inch tortillas to construct. You get your choice of meat, cheese, beans, rice, salsa, guacamole and sour cream. Competitive eating champion and San Jose native Joey Chestnut made a guest appearance at this point, eating the BurritoZilla in 3 minutes and 10 seconds. Henry's World Famous Hi-Life, opened in 1960, serves steaks, chicken, and pork chops cooked on their open pits that are fed with white oak logs. But, they are most noted for its baby back ribs. The ribs are coated in spices and brown sugar. Water is added and they are sealed with in a pan with foil and baked for two hours. They are then charred over open flames and coated with sauce. This episode's challenge was to complete the Hellfire Challenge at SmokeEaters Hot Wings. To win, Adam had to eat 12 chicken wings doused in a sauce composed of hot sauce, barbecue sauce, duck sauce, cayenne pepper and 6 ounces of habanero powder (equivalent to 6 whole habanero peppers). He had 10 minutes to eat the wings with no beverages or napkins available and then, if he succeeded, he had to lick the excess sauce off his fingers and hands, and then go through a 5-minute "afterburn" period where he remained unable to use any napkins, towels, or cooling remedies. To prep for the challenge, Adam ate some hot chili at a San Jose firehouse, before being called to answer the challenge. Adam was able to complete the challenge successfully, and was awarded a commemorative t-shirt and a spot on the Wall of Fame, but was in such pain from the sauce, that he needed ice from SmokeEaters' ice machine for relief.
Denver, CO	16	March 11, 2009	Food
Duffy's Cherry Cricket Adam ventured to Denver for burgers, steaks, and burritos. The show taped on January 20 at Duffy's Cherry Cricket where Richman had waitresses toss darts to determine which toppings he put on his special "Man v. Food Burger". The production team spent 8 hours at the restaurant. Bacon, a fried egg, guacamole, salsa, smoked cheddar, and grilled Bermuda onions were the randomly chosen toppings. The Denver Post further reported that he would be taping at The Buckhorn Exchange steakhouse on January 21 and Jack-n-Grill for New Mexican food on January 22. The Rocky Mountain News reported that Man v. Food would tape at Jack-n-Grill in Denver on January 22, as Adam faced off against a 7-pound "monster breakfast burrito". The burrito consisted of 7 diced potatoes, 12 eggs, an entire onion, and a pound each of ham, cheese, and green chili. If successful, Adam would get his picture up on the restaurant's Wall of Fame. This challenge had no time limit, but Adam was only able to finish two-thirds of the burrito before surrendering. The restaurant offers any man who can finish the burrito that the $12 price of the meal will be waived. However, any woman who can complete the challenge is offered the right to dine there "for free forever". Post-episode update: Jack-n-Grill closed its original location where the episode was taped in 2017 to help settle a divorce settlement for the owner. The other two locations were shuttered later in 2017 and 2018.
Research Triangle, North Carolina	17	March 18, 2009	Man
Adam traveled to the North Carolina Triangle, home to three of North Carolina's major universities (Duke, North Carolina, and North Carolina State), first to hand out hot dogs to several of the "Cameron Crazies" who were camping outside of Cameron Indoor Stadium in Durham, then to check out Time Out in Chapel Hill for their Chicken & Cheddar Biscuit. Time Out operates 24 hours a day and is a big stop for late night eats for the North Carolina college crowd. Vegetable shortening is combined with buttermilk and mixed into dough which is spread in a square metal tray. They are baked and brushed with butter. Slices of sharp cheddar are placed on a fried chicken and place on the buttered biscuit. He also traveled to The Pit in Raleigh where he learned to cook a whole pig with "local legend" Ed Mitchell. The pigs are cooked in the kitchen on a grill over a bed of vinegar marinated hickory wood and oak chips. The pigs are coated with salt and cooked for 14 hours. The meat is then pulled from the bones, chopped, coated with spices and mixed with apple cider vinegar and a secret sauce. This episode's challenge was also in Raleigh at The Roast Grill. He had to more hot dogs smothered with mustard and chili sauce) in an hour than the previous record of 16. If he does so, he gets his picture of the wall of fame and the privilege of renaming the challenge. Opened in 1940 by the grandparents of current owner George Poniros, The Roast Grill is noted for refusing to serve ketchup. The chili comes from a nearly 100-year-old recipe handed down from Poniros' grandparents. The hot dogs are 90 percent beef with a touch of pork flavoring and are cooked on the original 70-year-old grill. Adam wore North Carolina Tar Heels and Duke Blue Devils wristbands plus an NC State Wolfpack headband for the challenge. According to local press reports, the visit to The Pit was taped on January 28, and challenge at The Roast Grill was taped on January 30. Adam completed the challenge in about 30 minutes, and as the winner, renamed it the "Man v. Food Roast Grill Challenge".
Minneapolis, MN	18	March 25, 2009	Man
Adam traveled to Minneapolis in February to tape the season finale. In January, CityPages Minneapolis/St. Paul and fellow Travel Channel host Andrew Zimmern reported that Richman would be in town to tape the show from February 5 through 8. Richman visited "everything from Juicy Lucy joints to the brewski at local beer bars." Despite an initial press report of a rumor that taping had been cancelled, filming occurred on February 4 at Matt's Bar. At Matt's, you can only get the Juicy Lucy one way, cooked medium well with a piece of American cheese melted in the middle. On February 6 he went to the historic 5-8 Club to compare their version of the burger. Opened in 1928, The 5-8 Club allows you to choose between five different cheeses (blue cheese, Monterey jack, swiss, pepper jack and American). You can also order it as a Saucy Sally filled with thousand island dressing and sour cream. They also add more cheese in the middle than Matt's. When Adam tries to say which place has the best, and original, Juicy Lucy, a large van conveniently drives in front of him, preventing anyone from hearing him. He was escorted by Zimmern to rotisserie specialists Brasa Premium Rotisserie Restaurant to "see if he can eat everything on the steam table in one sitting". In an interview given during the taping of the North Carolina episode, Adam told the reporter: "I'm about to go to Minneapolis where a certain adorable, cuddly bald bear named Andrew Zimmern will be appearing on my show".. Opened in a former gas station, Brasa is known for their creole food and meat such as beef, pork and chicken cooked on a spit. Adam sampled their cheese grits, collared greens and slow roasted beef. Zimmern then has Adam try many different parts of an entire slow roasted tiny pig, including ear, snout and cheek. He then had Adam try ludefisk, a Scandinavian dish of dry salted cod that has been soaked in water, mixed with lye and then soaked in water again until it is ready to be baked or steamed. On February 7 at Gasthof zur Gemutlichkeit & Mario's Keller Bar for the episode's challenge, which was a giant bratwurst. Gasthof offers the Meter Bratwurst Challenge, a grilled German Bratwurst, weighing just over three pounds and measuring one meter (just over 3 feet) long and served with two side dishes of the challenger's choice. Adam chose red cabbage and potato croquettes. Anyone who completes the meal is awarded a certificate. Adam first went after just the bratwurst, cutting it into pieces to cool down faster. Adam started strong, but felt himself filling up halfway through the bratwurst. After finishing the bratwurst, he combined the red cabbage with the potato croquettes to finish the challenge and earn the certificate. Post-episode update: Gasthof zur Gemutlichkeit closed at the outset of the COVID-19 pandemic in 2020 and the building was later sold in 2021.
