= Slows Bar BQ =

- Interactive map of Slows Bar BQ

Restaurant information
- Established: 2005; 21 years ago
- Owners: Ron, Phillip, and Ryan Cooley and Dean St.Souver.
- Chef: Brian Perrone
- Food type: Barbecue
- Location: 2138 Michigan Avenue, Detroit, Michigan, 48216, United States
- Coordinates: 42.331566°N 83.075946°W
- Website: slowsbarbq.com

Slows Bar BQ is a barbecue restaurant in Detroit, Michigan, with additional locations in Ann Arbor and Berkley. The chef is Brian Perrone, and the restaurant is owned by the Cooley family. The restaurant appeared on Adam Richman's Man vs. Food, and the "Yardbird", a pulled chicken sandwich from the restaurant, competed in the first season of Adam Richman's Best Sandwich in America.

== Description ==
Slows Bar BQ is located in the Corktown Historic District in Detroit, Michigan, opposite the Michigan Central Station. It was founded by former fashion model Phillip Cooley, his father Ron, brother Ryan, and chef Brian Perrone.

In 2023 Slows was sold to founding Chef Brian Perrone, Managing Director, Terry Perrone, and Catering Director Josh Keillor.

The restaurant opened in 2005, and is seen as one of the first modern destination restaurants in Detroit. During the first year in business, the restaurant took $1.8 million. The owners also own the catering and takeaway company Slows to Go.

The premises were expanded during January 2013 into the next door property which formerly housed a real estate business. The premises had previously been used by Slows for private events, and the expansion allowed an additional bar and kitchen space to be added to the restaurant.

One of the sandwiches served at Slows is the "Yardbird": a pulled chicken breast marinated in mustard, served with mushrooms, cheddar and applewood bacon, all inside a poppy-seed bun. Adam Richman, who first visited the restaurant during Man v. Food in 2009, returned to Slows in 2012 when he selected the Yardbird to compete on the Travel Channel's Adam Richman's Best Sandwich in America. It competed in the great lakes episode. It defeated a fish taco torta in Minneapolis and a prime rib sandwich in Green Bay (and was declared best sandwich in the Great Lakes), and progressed to the finals. In the final it faced eleven other sandwiches for the inaugural title, and made it to the final round, ultimately losing out to a roast pork sandwich from Tommy DiNic's in Philadelphia. The "Yardbird" finished in the top 3 in the competition.

Another notable sandwich, one tried by Richman during his 2009 Man v. Food visit to Slows, is the "Triple Threat Pork": a 1-pound sandwich stacking together applewood-smoked bacon, pulled pork, and grilled ham, on a poppy-seed bun.

== Reception ==
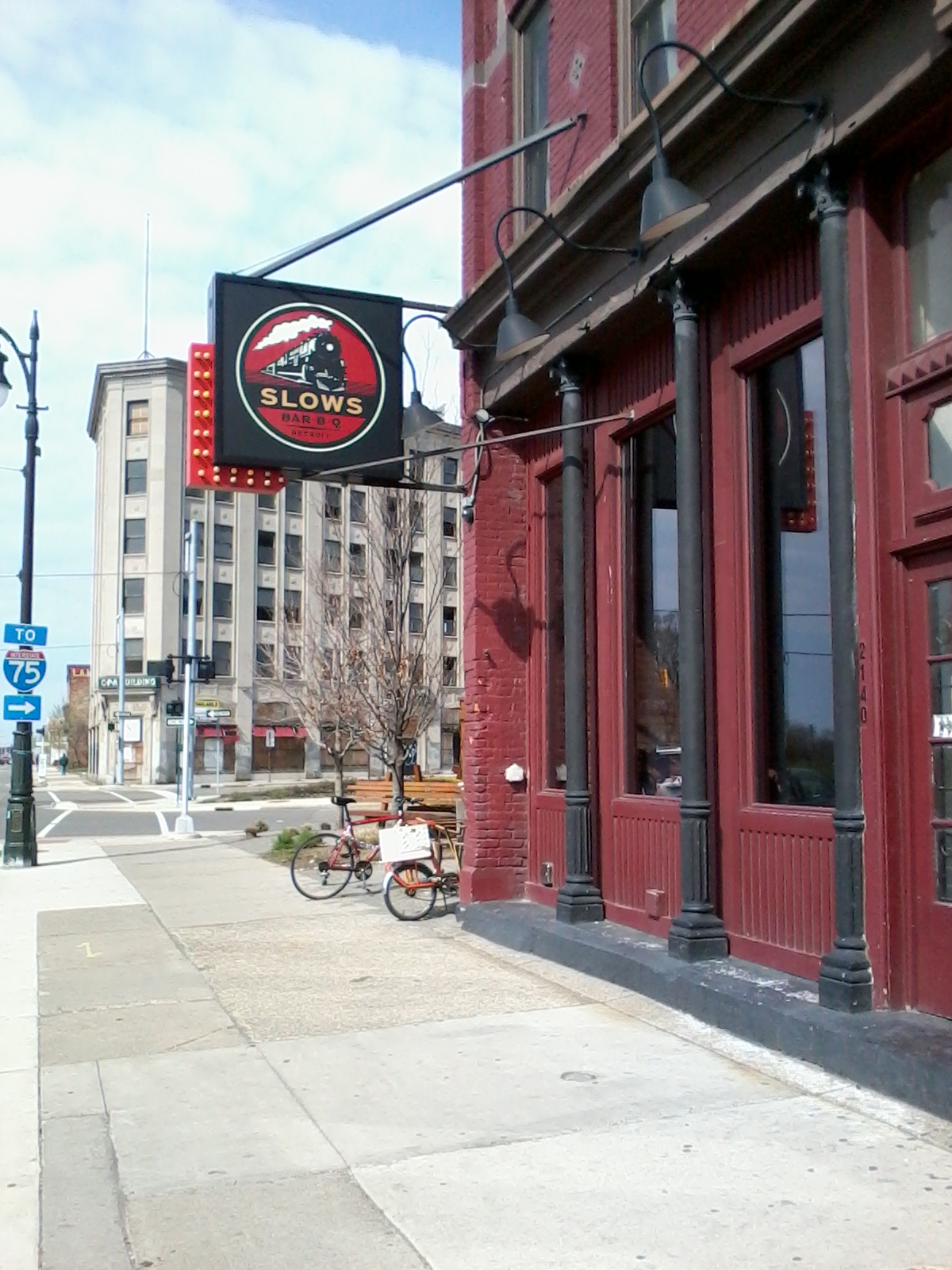
Slow's Bar BQ in Detroit, MI.

Actress Erin Cummings said of the menu "you can’t go to Slow’s and eat healthy... you have to go to Slow’s ready to knock it back". Adam Richman described the food at Slow's as "a truly life-changing experience", while trying the triple threat pork sandwich in his show Man vs. Food. Richman also described the macaroni and cheese as "transcendental", and included it on a list of five meals "not to be missed" from around the United States in a segment on NBC's The Today Show. Justine Sterling listed the mac n cheese as one of the top ten in America for Food and Wine magazine.

Raymond Sokolov of The Wall Street Journal approved of the food at Slow's while travelling around the area tasting burgers. He said that it was "my best sandwich of the day. The beef is charred. The cheese is gouda with a nice snap. The bun doesn't ooze away under finger pressure."

== See also ==
- List of barbecue restaurants
