= Round Rock Donuts =

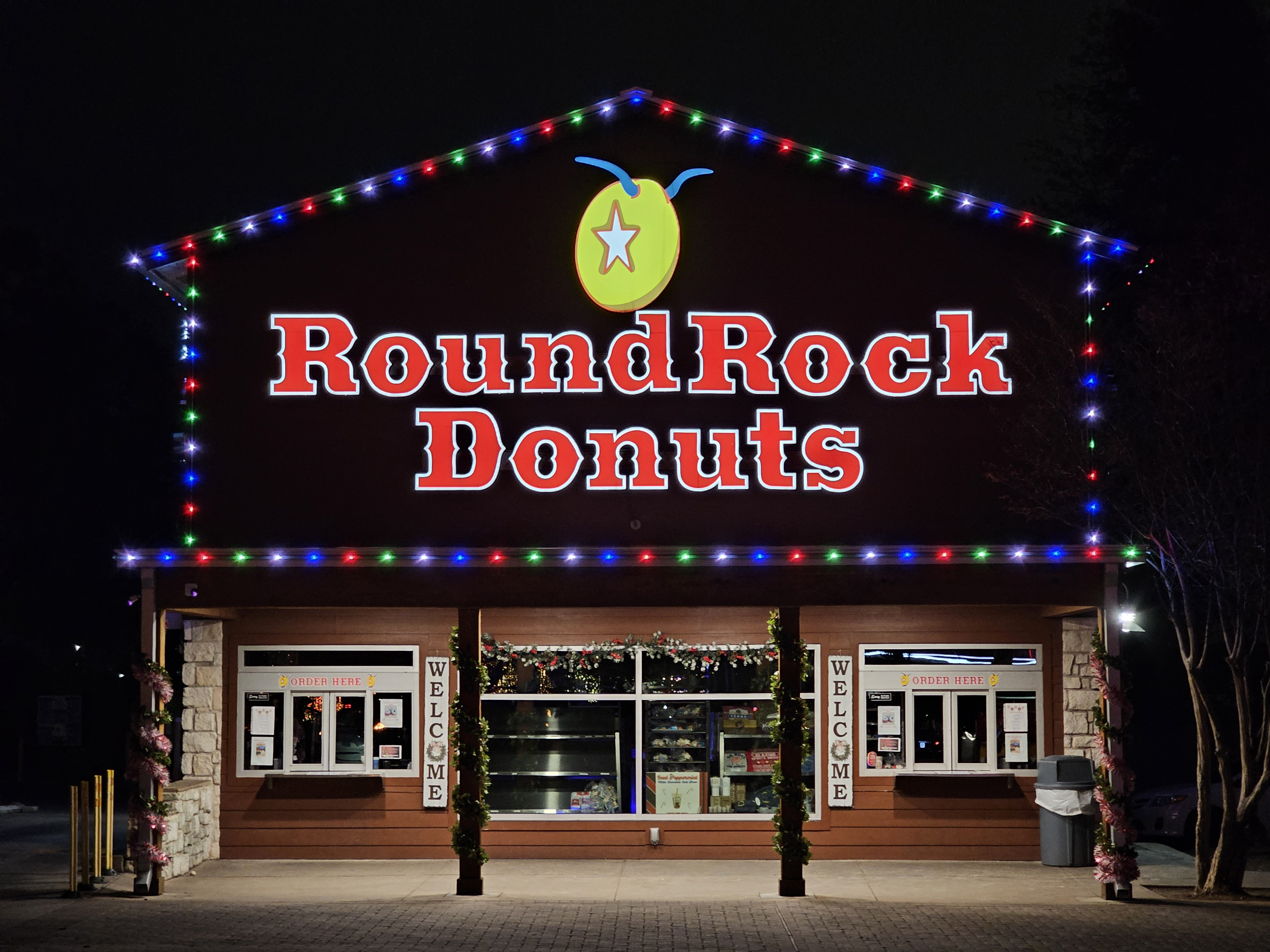
- Storefront in December 2024
- Interactive map of Round Rock Donuts

Restaurant information
- Established: 1926; 100 years ago
- Owners: Jan and Dale Cohrs
- Previous owners: Lavern and Charles Baird
- Food type: Doughnuts, kolachess, cinnamon rolls, and coffee
- Location: 106 W Liberty, Round Rock, Texas, Texas, 78665, United States
- Coordinates: 30.5092°N 97.6798°W
- Seating capacity: 0
- Reservations: No
- Other locations: 1
- Website: https://roundrockdonuts.com/

Round Rock Donuts is a doughnut shop established in 1926 in Round Rock, Texas that has appeared in numerous "best of" lists, including ones put out by Texas Monthly in 1976, Bon Appétit in 2010, The Daily Meal in 2013, Yelp in 2022, TasteAtlas in 2025, etc.

Round Rock Donuts has had a second location in Cedar Park, Texas since 2022.

== History ==
Established in 1926, Round Rock Donuts, then known as Lone Star Bakery, moved to its present location, 106 W Liberty, in Round Rock, Texas, in 1970, due to lack of parking space at their old location, at 101 East Main Street.

In January 1977, Round Rock Donuts opened up a second location in Austin, Texas at 5453 Burnet Rd.

In September 1978 Jan and Dale Cohrs purchased Round Rock Donuts from Lavern and Charles Baird, who themselves, had owned it for 13 years. The recipe that had been conveyed with the purchase was not the "real recipe", which was only re-discovered after a former employee recalled it.

In April 1985 Round Rock Donuts opened up a new second location (by this time the location off of Burnet road had closed) in Round Rock, Texas at 409 Round Rock Avenue.

In the evening of Tuesday, September 12, 2000, firefighters responded to a grease fire started by a deep fryer. Damage from the fire forced the closure of Round Rock Donuts, which would not re-open, again, until Tuesday, October 10, 2000, when a portable building was set up in the parking lot. Construction on a replacement permanent building began on September 21, 2000 and, on December 5, after about 2.5 months, the newly constructed building was opened for business for the first time. Whereas the last permanent building was one story tall this new building was two stories tall and featured new ventilation and sprinkler systems.

In March 2002 Austin Business Journal reported that Round Rock Donuts had an annual revenue of $2 million.

In October 2002 Round Rock Donuts opened up a new second location (by this time the second location in Round Rock had closed) in Pflugerville, Texas, at 1202 FM 685. At around the same time as this expansion the company became officially known as Round Rock Bakery Ltd. The name Lone Star Bakery could not be used as a company based out of San Antonio, Texas, has/had the expansion rights. "We now have all the registrations and trademarks for Round Rock Donuts and will be marketing it in the new locations" CEO Dale Cohrs told the Austin American-Statesman. This new location had closed down by at least May 2013

On February 20, 2022, Round Rock Donuts opened up a new second location in Cedar Park, Texas, at 1614 E. Whitestone Blvd.

== Doughnuts ==
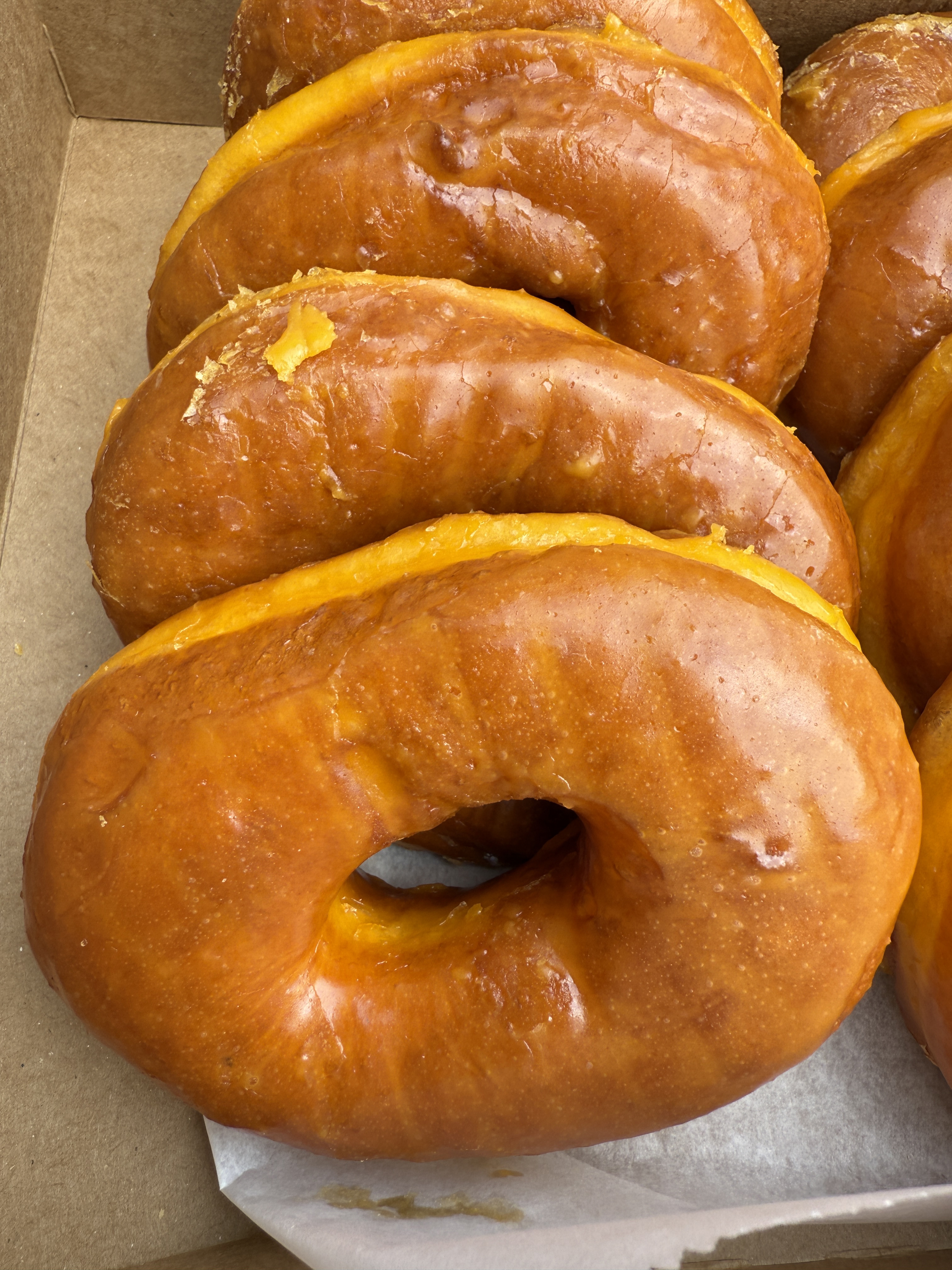
Glazed Round Rock Donuts.

Round Rock Doughnuts distinctive golden-orange tint was historically due to specialty eggs, however, in more recent times, regular eggs have been used with egg color die.

Whereas most doughnut shops use baking powder-based dough, Round Rock doughnuts use baker's yeast-based dough that is rolled, cut, fried and iced by hand.

Although the 2-pound 14-inch Texas-size doughnut is frequently noted in media coverage, the shop's top-selling varieties are (1) the classic glazed, (2) the chocolate-covered glazed and (3) the strawberry-sprinkle glazed.

== Accolades and notable media appearances ==
In 1976 Texas Monthly declared Round Rock Donuts (as Lone Star Bakery) as having the best doughnuts in Texas

In 1998 Round Rock Donuts (as Lone Star Bakery) won a Local Legends award from the City of Round Rock

In 2007 Texas Highways ran a story about Round Rock Donuts

In 2008, in the 5th episode of the first season of Man vs Food, host Adam Richman devoured giant Round Rock Donuts

In 2010 Bon Appétit included Round Rock Donuts in its list of "Top 10 Best Places for Donuts"

In 2011 Texas Country Reporter ran a segment on Round Rock Donuts

In 2013 The Daily Meal put out a list of "America's Top 25 Donuts" and Round Rock Donuts came in as #2

In 2015 The Daytripper featured Round Rock Donuts in an episode about Round Rock, Texas.

In 2022 Yelp ranked Round Rock Donuts as the #1 doughnut shop in the United States.

In 2025 TasteAtlas ranked Round Rock Donuts as #21 out of 150 of "Most Legendary [Global] Dessert Places". Of the US based businesses on that list Round Rock Donuts ranked as #4
