= Thurman Cafe =

Restaurant in Columbus, Ohio

The Thurman Cafe
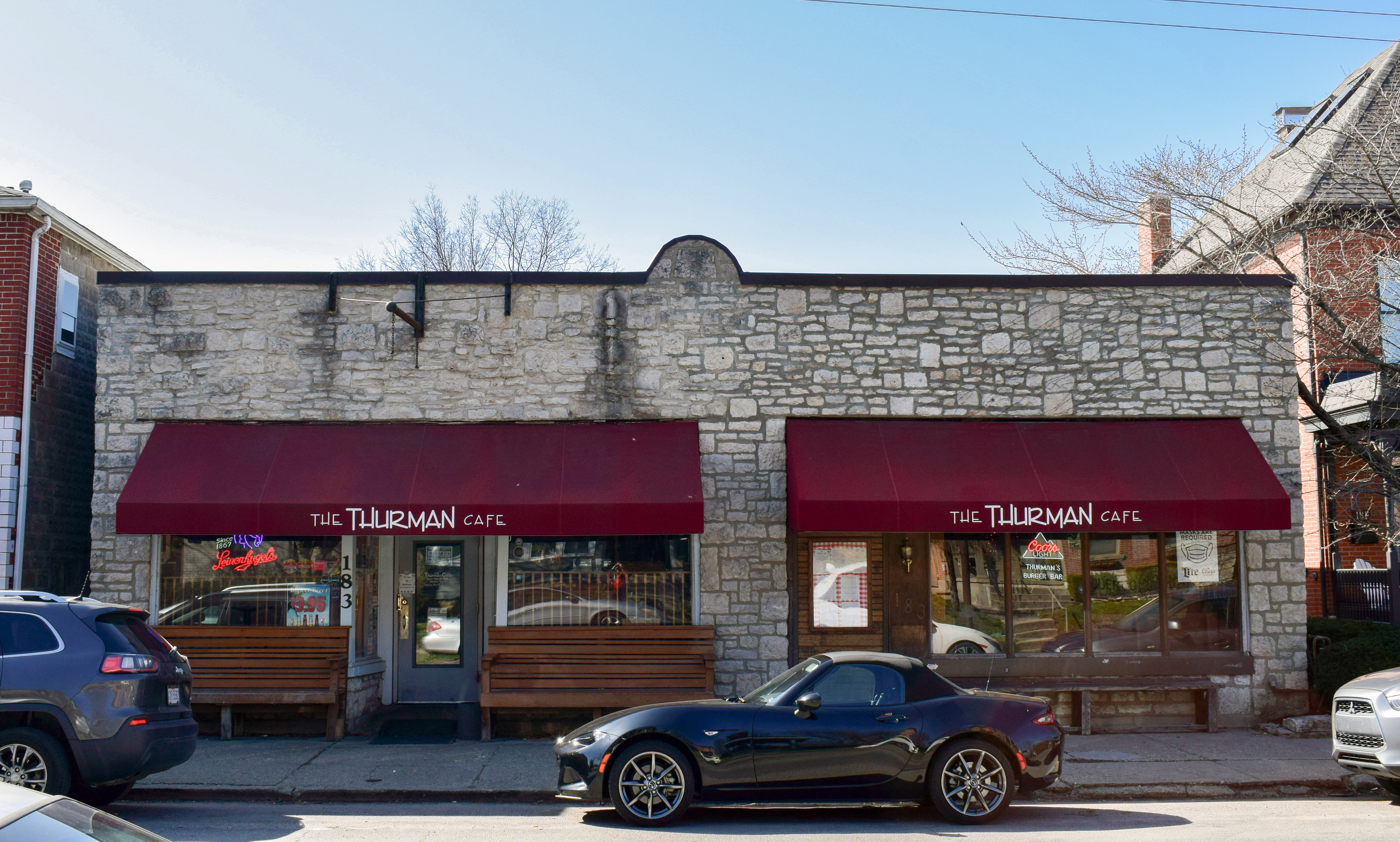
- Interactive map of The Thurman Cafe

Restaurant information
- Established: 1942; 84 years ago
- Owner: Nick Suclescy
- Location: 183 Thurman Avenue, Columbus, Ohio
- Coordinates: 39°56′22.416″N 82°59′27.97″W
- Website: thethurmancafe.com

The Thurman Cafe (or Thurman's) is a cafe and bar in the German Village district of Columbus, Ohio. It was opened in 1942 by Nick Suclescy, and has remained a family-owned establishment ever since. Thurman Cafe is considered to have one of the best hamburgers in the country. In 2014, a descendant of Sucklescy opened a similar restaurant called Son of Thurman in Delaware, Ohio.

On April 12th 2026 the restaurant sustained significant structural damage from an electrical fire that started in the rear area of the building. It remains closed indefinitely until the damage can be repaired.

== The Thurman Burger ==
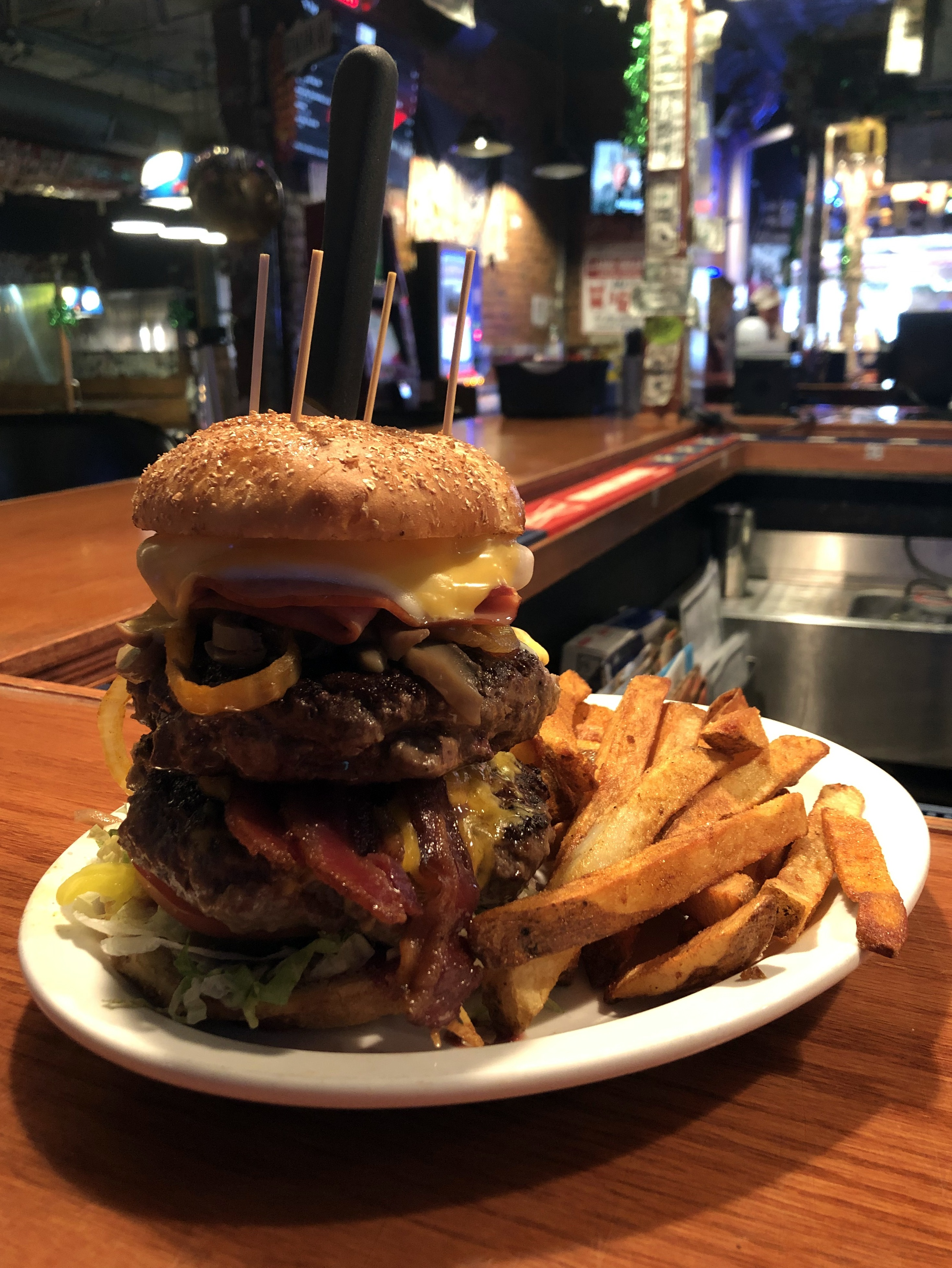
The Thurmanator

Thurman's is often associated with its famous burger known as the Thurmanator. It consists of a bun, lettuce, tomato, mayo, American cheese, provolone cheese, ham, sauteed onions, mushrooms, a 12-ounce burger, bacon, cheddar cheese, hot peppers, and another 12 ounce burger. The burger also comes with house-made kettle chips and a pickle spear.

The burger was featured on the Travel Channel's TV show Man v. Food (season 1) where the host, Adam Richman, ate a Thurman burger and was then introduced to the Thurmanator. Richman explains the Thurmanator originated as the preferred fuel for competitors in the Arnold Classic bodybuilding competition. The burger was not listed on the menu at the time of the Man v. Food taping (originally aired 10 December 2008), but has since been added.

== Awards & recognitions ==
- CitySearch's Best of CitySearch
- Food Network's Best of the Best of
