= Phil's BBQ =

Barbeque restaurant

Coordinates: 32.7504°N 117.1715°W

- Trade name: Phil's BBQ
- Native name: Phil's BBQ, Inc.
- Type: Private
- Industry: Restaurant
- Founded: 1998; 28 years ago
- Founder: Phil Pace
- Headquarters: San Diego, California, San Diego, United States
- Number of locations: 4 Stores, 1 Outlet Airport
- Key people: Kevin Sheehan, President & CEO; Nicholas Vick, COO

Phil's BBQ is a barbeque restaurant that was founded by Phil Pace. Their first location opened in 1998 in the Mission Hills neighborhood of San Diego, California. They have since expanded and now have four restaurant locations, with additional outlet in San Diego International Airport with a new location in Chandler, Arizona to be opened in 2027. The restaurants have received positive reception. Cameras were installed at each location to view wait times. It was featured on the shows Adam Richman's Best Sandwich in America and Man v. Food. Phil's BBQ was the second most commonly reviewed business in the United States on Yelp for 2013.

== History ==
Phil's BBQ was first opened in 1998 in the Mission Hills in San Diego, California, by owner Phil Pace. In 2007, it closed Missions Hills doors to relocated in Point Loma. Another location was later opened in 2010 in San Marcos.

In 2012, Phil leased approximately 7,000 square feet of land for a new location in Santee. The restaurant first opened on October 30, 2012 at the Old Trolley Square. A type of camera (called "BBQUEUE CAM") was registered with the United States Patent and Trademark Office and installed at each location so customers can gauge wait times visit on the restaurant's official website..

In 2013, San Diego International Airport open a Phil's BBQ and the restaurant had an official ribbon cutting in the newly renovated Terminal 2. Two locations were opened in Petco Park the 1st was opened in March 2013 which was named "Stadium Food King" and a second location in March 2014 near Section 113 but both locations in Petco Park have since been closed.

On April 25, 2016, an 8th location was opened in Rancho Bernardo.

Sycuan Casino opened a Phil's BBQ outlet in their "unCommons" in 2019.

During the COVID-19 pandemic in California, the San Marcos location was closed down in 2020, Pace said "The decision to close really, truly was heartfelt." On Friday July 3, 2020, a 10th location in Temecula, originally scheduled to open in March 2020, was opened. The location was originally scheduled to open in March 2020 but was rescheduled due to Riverside County being ordered by California Governor Gavin Newsom to close restaurants.

=== Future expansion ===
The restaurant is planning to open a Chandler, Arizona location in 2027. This will be the first Arizona restaurant with a full renovation of a 10,000 square foot former Mexican restaurant.

== Philanthropic activities ==
The restaurant hosted a barbeque benefit the Big Brothers Big Sisters of San Diego County for from 2008 until 2019 at .

It has also helped sponsor events for the San Diego Police Foundation Women in Blue, the San Diego Police Foundation K9 Program, and the San Diego Center for Children.

== Recognition ==
The restaurant participated in a Travel Channel television show Adam Richman's Best Sandwich in America in 2012, and its "El Toro" sandwich won the title of best sandwich on the West Coast. The sandwich was also featured on an earlier show by Richman called Man v. Food.

San Diego Magazine Readers' Picks voted the restaurant as Best Barbeque seventeen times from 2008 to 2025, and the California Restaurant Association awarded it the Gold Medallion for Best BBQ thirteen times from 2006 to 2019. The restaurant was awarded the Gold Medallion for Restaurant of the Year by the association in 2009.

The restaurant was the second most commonly reviewed business on the user-based review website Yelp in the United States for 2013.

Business Insider rated the restaurant in the top 50 Best Barbecue Joints in America in 2016.

The San Diego Airport location was named number 1 for atmosphere by USA Today's 10 Best Airport Bars and Restaurants for Atmosphere in March 2016.

In March of 2022, Yelp rated the restaurant as second in their top 50 most reviewed restaurants and eateries.

The website Decor Hint described the restaurant in a February 2026 food review as a "jaw dropping experience".

Nextdoor San Diego Midway Community voted as the 2026 "Fave" Local Go-To Restaurant.

== See also ==
- List of barbecue restaurants
