= Crown Candy Kitchen =

American fast food restaurant

Coordinates: 38.651319°N 90.197825°W

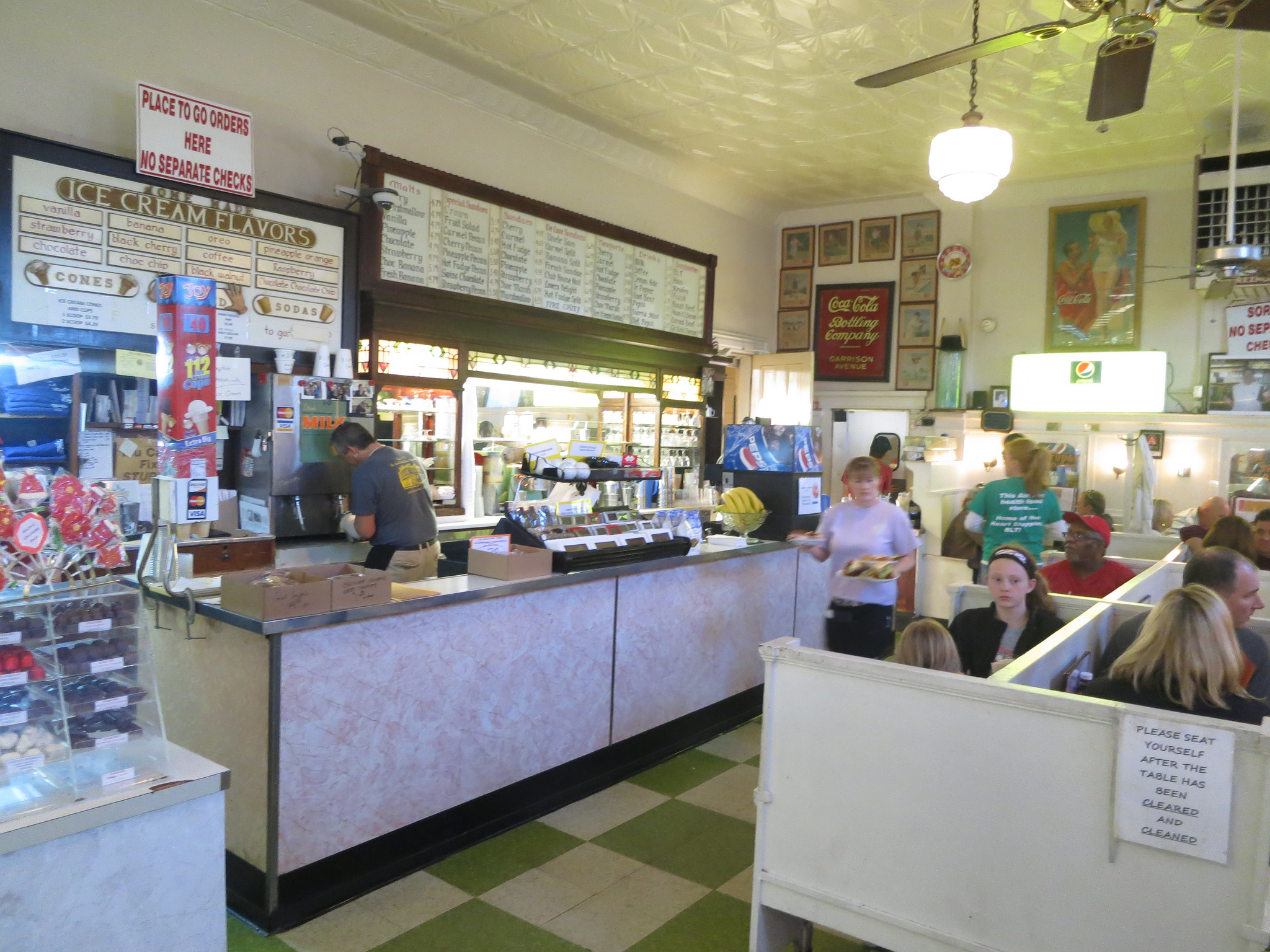
Crown Candy Kitchen. Behind the counter, proprietor Andy Karandzieff mans the milkshake machine.

Crown Candy Kitchen is a fast food restaurant, ice cream fountain, and candy store located on St. Louis Avenue in the Old North St. Louis neighborhood of St. Louis, Missouri.

This St. Louis landmark is the oldest operating soda fountain in the metropolitan area, and one of the oldest in the country. The restaurant has an old-fashioned decor with Coca-Cola memorabilia from the 1930s, an antique cash register, and four-person booths. It offers a simple menu with sandwiches, "Chili, Tamales and Other Hot Stuff" and is known for its desserts, especially its handmade malts and milkshakes. It is a popular lunch destination for office workers in downtown St. Louis. The chocolate is made from decades-old molds, some imported from Holland and Germany.

== History ==
The restaurant was founded in 1913 by two Greek immigrants, Harry Karandzieff and his friend Pete Jugaloff. It was first operated by Harry and Pete, then the former's son, George, and later George's three sons, Andy, Tommy, and Mike.

Harry and Pete opened Crown Candy in 1913.

Crown Candy has been making ice cream since 1925.

A fire caused by a space heater damaged the restaurant on December 25, 1983. Some Coca-Cola memorabilia and $2,000 of candy was destroyed.

Business was slowest in the 1970s and picked up in the 1990s.

Crown Candy switched from Coca-Cola to Pepsi in 1999.

George died in hospice on Easter Sunday of 2005 after his sons finished up their work at Crown Candy, with Easter being their busiest time of year.

== Famous treats ==
The "Heart-Stopping BLT" uses 14 pieces of crispy, kettle-cooked bacon. It was first offered to Adam Richman and later featured on Best Sandwich in America in 2012. According to Andy Karandzieff, employees gradually increased the bacon over time. Crown Candy continues to hand-make its chocolate candy.

== Crown Candy challenge ==
The restaurant offers a five-malt challenge. Participants must drink five 24-ounce malts in 30 minutes to receive them free and have their name added to a plaque.

== Recognition ==
In 2025, *Missouri Restaurant Association St. Louis * named Crown Candy Kitchen **Restauranteur of the Year**, honoring the Karandzieff family for preserving the city’s historic soda fountain culture and culinary traditions.

== In popular culture ==
The challenge appeared on the Travel Channel series Man v. Food in 2009, hosted by Adam Richman.
