= John's Roast Pork =

Restaurant in Pennsylvania, United States

Coordinates: 39.92117°N 75.14528°W

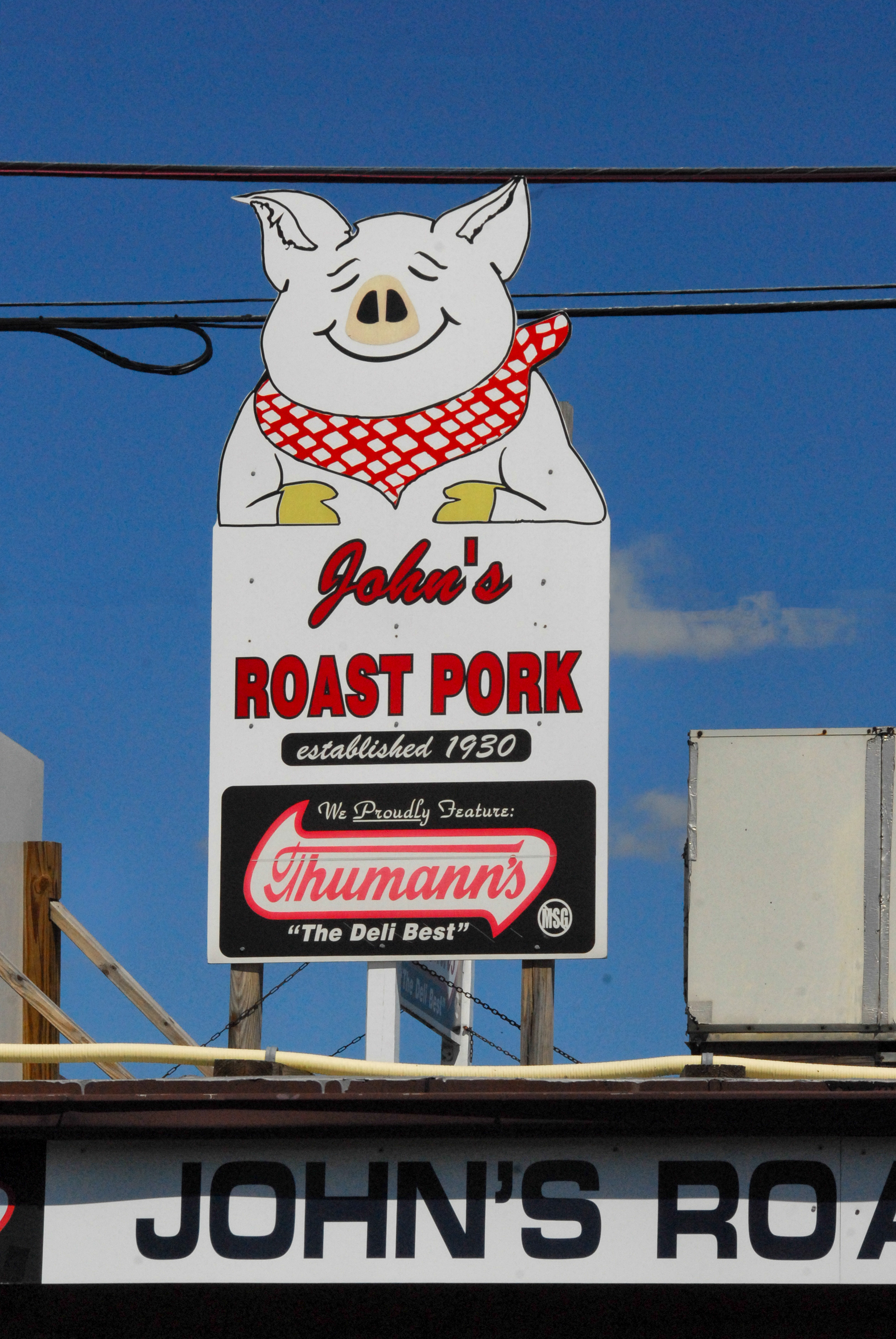
- John's Roast Pork sign
- Interactive map of John's Roast Pork

Restaurant information
- Established: 1930; 96 years ago
- Owner: John Bucci Jr.
- Food type: Roast pork sandwich, cheesesteaks and other sandwiches
- Dress code: Casual
- Location: 14 E Snyder Avenue, Philadelphia, United States, Pennsylvania, 19148
- Website: www.johnsroastpork.com

John's Roast Pork is an Italian roast pork and cheesesteak eatery in South Philadelphia that was founded in 1930 at its original location on East Snyder Avenue in Philadelphia, just outside the Pennsport and Whitman neighborhoods. The eatery is considered a favorite among South Philadelphia locals and has gained mainstream recognition for its roast pork and cheesesteaks.

== History ==
John's Roast Pork was established in 1930 and is currently being run by John Bucci Jr., the family's third generation. The restaurant is known for its short hours, historically only open from 6:45 AM to 3:00 PM. In 2013, it expanded to serving after hours at Mick Daniel's Saloon two blocks away. In 2015, John's extended its hours, opening from 7 AM to 7 PM.

Before Phillip Morris sales manager John "Butch" Gleason died, he requested to be buried with a sandwich from John's Roast Pork.

== Awards ==
John's roast pork sandwich and sharp provolone cheesesteaks were featured in the championship finale of the Travel Channel's Best Sandwich in America and has been described by food critic Andrew Zimmern as well-seasoned to the secret Bucci family recipe and deboned "right on premises".

The establishment was designated as an "American Classic" for roast pork by the James Beard Foundation in 2006.

In 2014, Niki Achitoff-Gray of Serious Eats considered John's Roast Pork, the best classic roast pork sandwich in Philadelphia as well as acknowledging them for their cheesesteaks.

== Television ==
John's Roast Pork has appeared on the television shows Adam Richman's Best Sandwich in America and on the Travel Channel.

== See also ==
- List of submarine sandwich restaurants
