= Red Mill Burgers =

American restaurant chain in Seattle, Washington

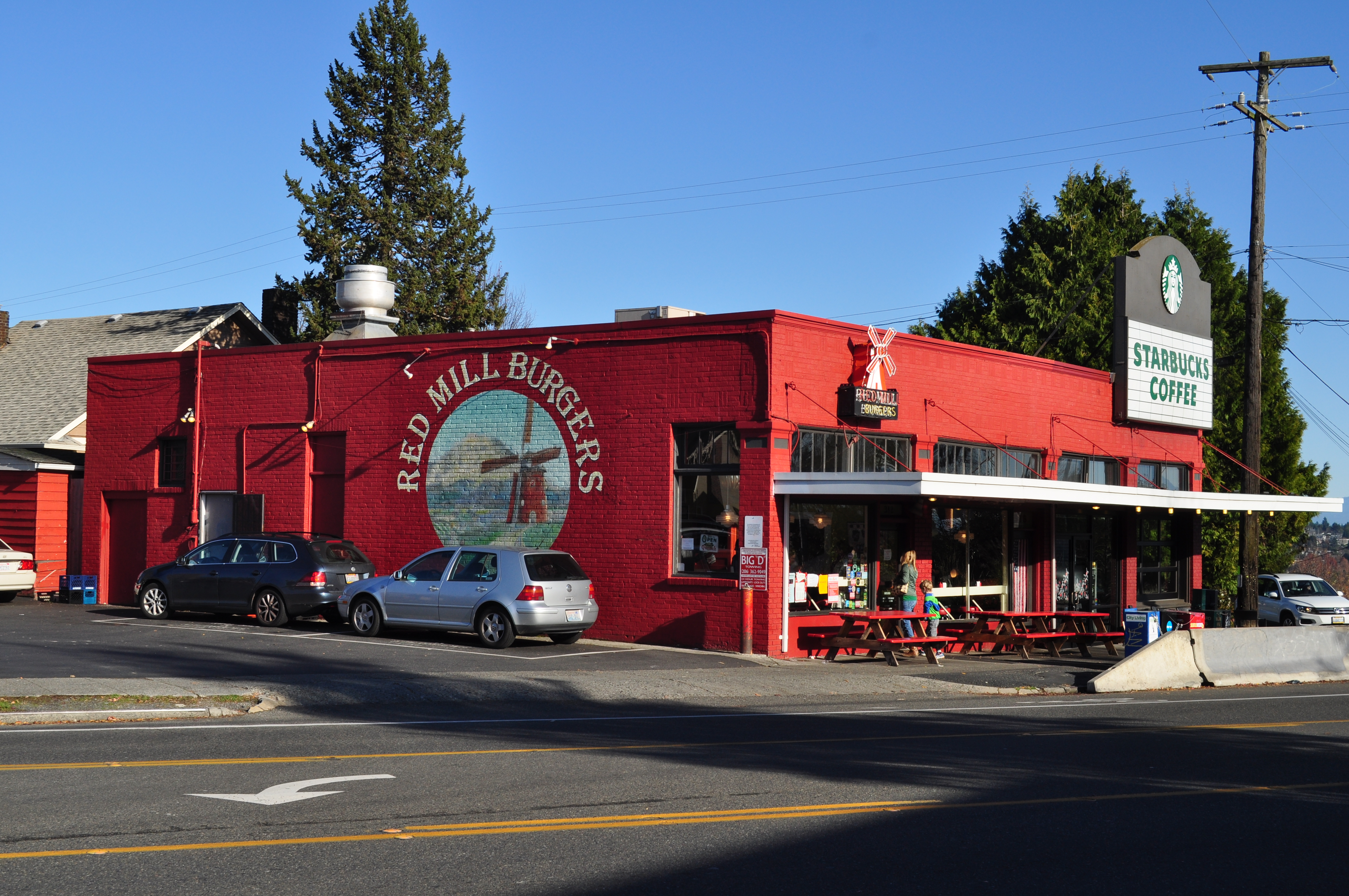
Red Mill Burgers on Phinney Ridge

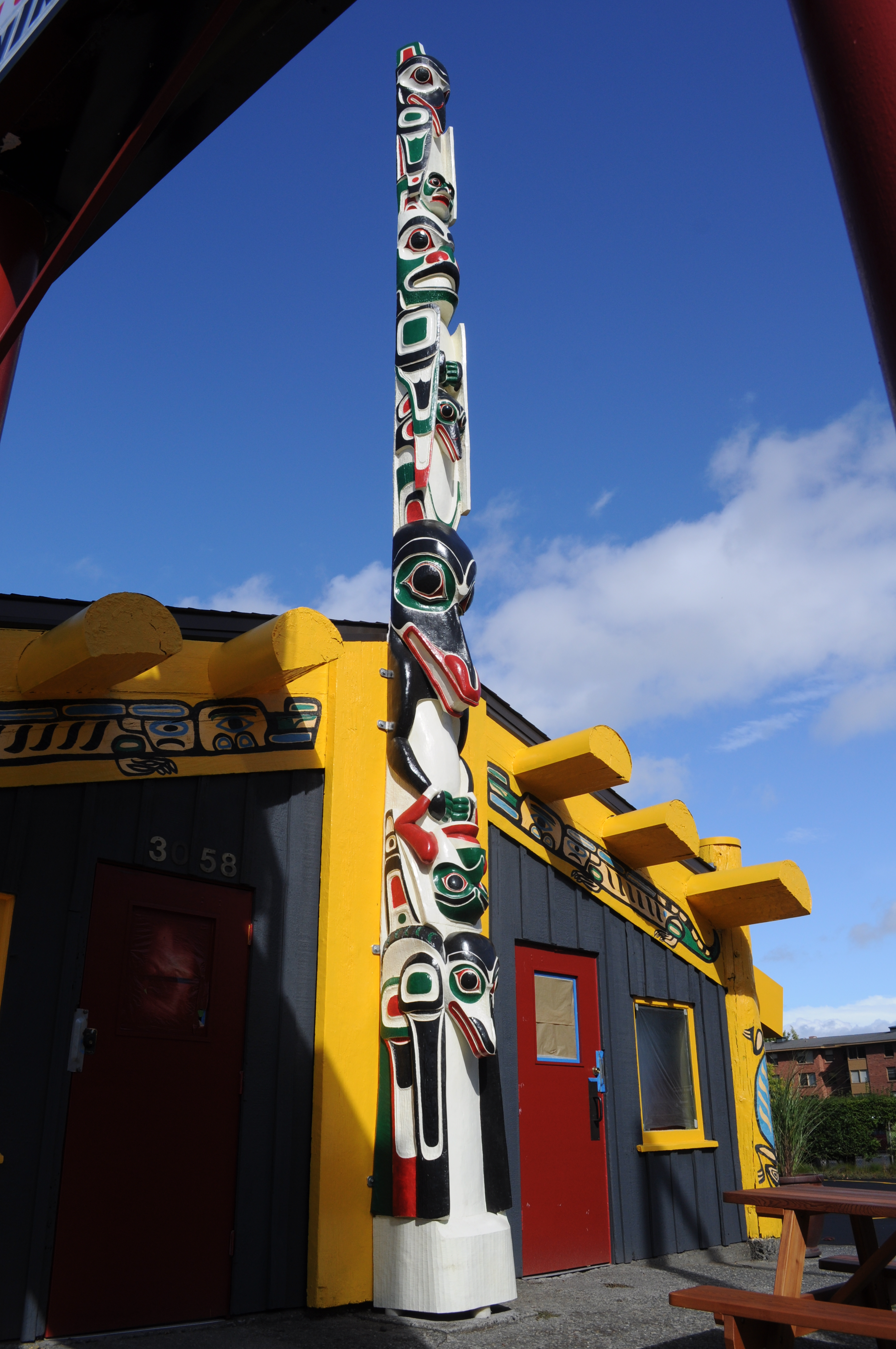
Detail of Totem House, remodeled as Red Mill Burgers' location in Ballard

Red Mill Burgers is an American restaurant in Seattle, Washington with locations in the Phinney Ridge, Interbay and Ballard neighborhoods.

== History ==
The first Red Mill opened in the Capitol Hill, Seattle neighborhood in 1937, but eventually closed down in 1967. It reopened with new owners in Phinney Ridge in 1994 and Interbay in 1998. A third location opened in Ballard near the Ballard Locks in late 2011.

== Recognition ==
Red Mill remains one of the most popular burger restaurants in Seattle, winning praise in the Seattle Weekly's Best of Seattle for ten consecutive years. It was mentioned in GQ magazine and The Oprah Winfrey Show. The restaurant was spotlighted in a February 2009 episode of Man v. Food.

In 2016, owner John Shepherd faced widespread criticism over allegedly sexist and transphobic Facebook posts. He stepped down from his position indefinitely.

== See also ==
- Grill-A-Burger
