= Barking Crab =

Seafood restaurant in Boston, MA, USA

- Exterior of the Barking Crab in Boston

- Location within Boston

Restaurant information
- Established: 1994; 32 years ago
- Dress code: casual
- Location: 88 Sleeper Street, Boston, Suffolk, Massachusetts, 02210, USA
- Coordinates: 42°21′14″N 71°02′55″W
- Reservations: no
- Other locations: Newport, Rhode Island
- Website: barkingcrab.com

The Barking Crab is a seafood restaurant in Fort Point, Boston. In 2008, they opened a location in Newport, Rhode Island. It has since closed. In 2014, under executive chef Joshua Brown, they completed phase two of their reinvention.

In November 2020, a man was arrested for breaking into the restaurant and stealing bottles of liquor. In April 2022, Steven Tyler, the frontman of Aerosmith, visited the Barking Crab.

== Popular culture ==
The Barking Crab appeared in the movie The Game Plan. They also appeared on Man v. Food season 1 where a four-pound clambake and a platter of fried seafood were featured.

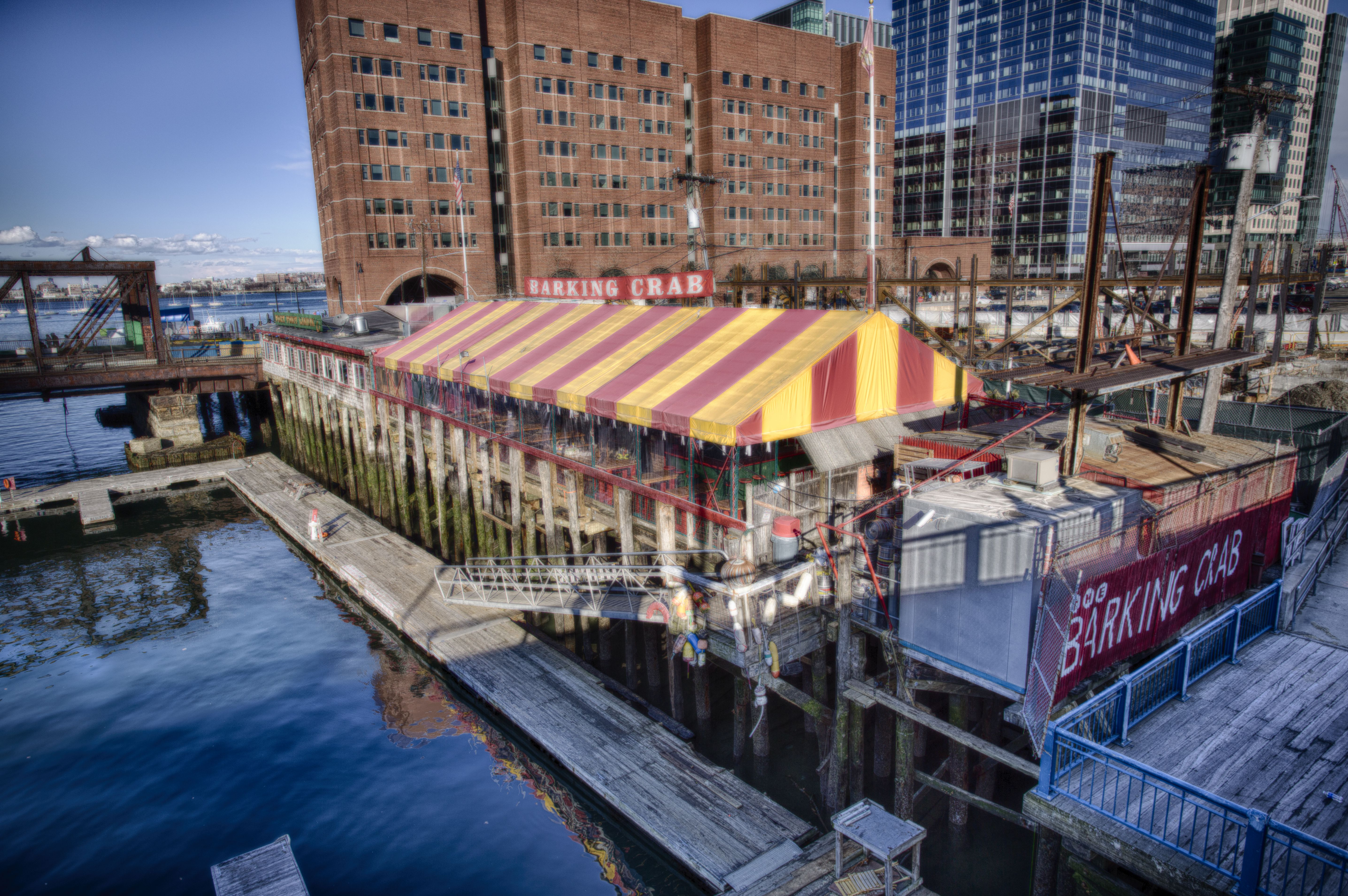
