= Adam Richman's Best Sandwich in America =

2012 American reality television series

- Genre: Food reality
- Directed by: Catherine Pappas
- Presented by: Adam Richman
- Composers: Audio Network; Pump Audio
- Country of origin: United States
- Original language: English
- No. of seasons: 1
- No. of episodes: 11

Production
- Executive producers: Matt Sharp; Dan Adler; Adam Richman
- Cinematography: Dan Akiba
- Editors: Scott Besselle; Bobby Munster; Matt Clements
- Camera setup: Multi-camera
- Running time: 21 minutes
- Production company: Sharp Entertainment

Original release
- Network: Travel Channel
- Release: June 6 – August 15, 2012

Adam Richman's Best Sandwich in America is an American food reality television series that premiered on June 6, 2012, on the Travel Channel. The program is hosted by actor and food enthusiast Adam Richman. In each episode, Richman samples what he considers to be the best sandwiches across the country, chooses a regional favorite, and then pits the winners against each other to find the nation's No. 1 sandwich.

== Premise ==
Adam Richman's Best Sandwich in America features "one man's quest"—Adam Richman—to find the best thing since "sliced bread on sliced bread". Richman will sample the three most mouthwatering sandwiches in different regions across the United States, evaluate each one with his "B.I.T.E. Scale" (Bread, Interior, Taste, and Eating Experience) and then crown one sandwich "supreme". Each episode ends with Richman adding a send-off of the regional favorite sandwiches that got left behind. The weekly series featured eleven episodes (ten half-hour episodes with a one-hour finale).

=== Opening ===
The show opens with the following quote:

"The sandwich. I've sampled countless variations of this delectable and ingenious American icon. But one question remains. Which one is the best? To find out, I'm tasting my top three sandwiches in ten U.S. regions. I'll subject each sandwich to my trademark B.I.T.E. Scale. The one who rises above the rest will win the region and move on to the national championship for a chance to be crowned Adam Richman's Best Sandwich in America".

== Celebrities ==
Every episode (save the Mid-Atlantic episode) starts off with a celebrity recommending his or her favorite sandwich in a different region.

- Kevin Pollak - Film actor/comedian (favorite sandwich in Northeast: Primanti Bros. stuffed sandwiches)
- Anthony Bourdain - Chef/food traveler (favorite sandwich in Gulf Coast: Domilise's shrimp po'boy)
- Will Hoge - Rising country music star (favorite sandwich in South: Mitchell Delicatessen Asian flank-steak sandwich)
- Curtis Granderson - Professional baseball player (favorite sandwich in Midwest: Fifty/50 "4-Courser" sandwich)
- Mario Batali - Celebrity chef (favorite sandwich in Northwest: Salumi braised oxtail sandwich)
- Jay Baruchel - Film actor (favorite sandwich in West Coast: JR's Barbeque pulled pork sandwich)
- Andrew Zimmern - Food traveler (favorite sandwich in Great Lakes: Tilia Fish Taco Torta)
- Bobby Flay - Celebrity chef (favorite sandwich in Southwest: The Salt Lick brisket jalapeño sandwich)
- Samantha Brown - Adventurer/traveler (favorite sandwich in New England: Jumpin' Jay's Fish Cafe crab-filled grilled cheese sandwich)
- G. Love - Rock musician (national championship wild card #1: John's Roast Pork cheesesteak)

== Episodes ==
No.	Title	Original release date
1	"Northeast"	June 6, 2012
Adam Richman begins his quest to find America's No. 1 sandwich. In the series premiere, Richman samples the best sandwiches in the Northeast. Featured sandwiches include: a french fry-stuffed capicola-fried egg-and-cheese sandwich from Primanti Bros. in Pittsburgh, Pennsylvania; a juicy roast pork sandwich topped with sharp provolone and sauteed broccoli rabe and drenched in pork gravy from Tommy DiNic's at the Reading Terminal Market in Philadelphia, Pennsylvania; and a pastrami-and-corned beef combo sandwich topped with Russian dressing and coleslaw on rye bread from Katz's Delicatessen in New York City. Winner: Tommy DiNic's roast pork sandwich Sandwiches that were left behind: "Beef on Weck" (The Silo, Lewiston, NY), the "Hot Beef" (Brennan & Carr, Brooklyn, NY), and the "Triple Decker" (Harold's Deli, Edison, NJ).
2	"Gulf Coast"	June 6, 2012
Richman heads to the Gulf Coast in search of the region's best sandwiches. Featured sandwiches include: a double-dipped fried shrimp po'boy with lettuce, pickles, homemade ketchup and hot sauce at Domilise's in New Orleans, Louisiana; a "medianoche" Cuban sandwich filled with boiled ham, serrano ham, slow-cooked pulled pork roasted in a sour orange and garlic mojo sauce, swiss cheese, salami, mustard, and pickles at the Aguila Sandwich Shop in Tampa, Florida; and a blackened grouper Reuben sandwich with swiss cheese, caramelized sauerkraut and thousand island dressing on grilled marble rye bread at Skipper's Smokehouse, also in Tampa. Winner: Domilise's fried shrimp po'boy Sandwiches that were left behind: "The Muffuletta" (Calypso Beach Cafe, Panama City Beach, FL) and the "Big Pulled Pork Sandwich" (The Brick Pit, Mobile, AL).
3	"South"	June 13, 2012
Richman seeks out the best sandwiches in the South. Featured sandwiches include: the Asian Flank-Steak Sandwich, a soy sauce and brown sugar-marinated grilled Angus steak topped with melted provolone cheese, an Asian-Italian giardiniera, and a slather of mayonnaise (and is only served on Mondays) from Mitchell Delicatessen in Nashville, Tennessee; the Chicken-and-Cheddar Biscuit at the "Research Triangle" of UNC, Duke and NC State at the college hangout Time-Out Restaurant in Chapel Hill, North Carolina; and the "Chicken Conquistador" sandwich, mustard-based marinated and secretly-spiced grilled sliced chicken topped with lettuce, tomato and two secret sauces on a toasted baguette at Zunzi's Express in Savannah, Georgia. Winner: Zunzi's Chicken Conquistador sandwich Sandwiches that were left behind: "The Hot Brown" (The Brown Hotel, Louisville, KY) and the "Chopped Pork Sandwich" (Mean Pig BBQ, Cabot, AR).
4	"Midwest"	June 20, 2012
Richman scopes out the tastiest sandwiches in the American Midwest. Featured sandwiches include: the "4-Courser", a unique sandwich combining jerk-rubbed pulled pork sauteed in a Béchamel sauce, fried jalapeño chips, "waffle-ized" 6-cheese macaroni and cheese, crunchy sweet potato chips, and barbecue sauce, all inside a pretzel bun, at Fifty/50 in Chicago, Illinois; the iconic Italian beef sandwich, featuring sliced roast beef in Italian bread, both drenched in hot beef gravy and topped with sweet peppers and spicy giardiniera at Al's #1 Italian Beef, also in Chicago; and the "Heart Stopping BLT", which features 14 strips of crispy kettle-cooked bacon, plus lettuce, tomato and mayonnaise, all inside toasted white bread, at Crown Candy Kitchen in St. Louis, Missouri. Winner: Al's Beef's Italian beef sandwich Sandwiches that were left behind: The "Adam Emmenecker" (Jethro's BBQ, Des Moines, IA) and "The Godfather" (Amato's, Omaha, NE).
5	"Mid-Atlantic"	June 27, 2012
Richman samples the best sandwiches in the Mid-Atlantic region. Featured sandwiches include: a saltine-encrusted lump crab cake sandwich from Faidley's Seafood at Lexington Market in Baltimore, Maryland; the deluxe double-decker chicken club (rosemary-marinated paillard chicken breast, applewood-smoked bacon, a sunny side-up egg, lettuce, tomato, mayonnaise and avocado all between sourdough toast) that's only ordered through room service at the W Hotel in Washington, D.C.; and the "C.S.S. Virginia" (named after the Civil War ironclad battleship) which is a 2-foot panko-breaded fried-chicken liver baguette "battleship" sandwich topped with an apple-cabbage-green onion slaw and remoulade from The Black Sheep in Richmond, Virginia. Winner: Black Sheep's C.S.S. Virginia battleship sandwich Sandwiches that were left behind: "The Raven" (Chaps Charcoal Restaurant, Baltimore, MD), the pit beef sandwich (Chaps Charcoal Restaurant, Baltimore, MD) and the "U.S.S. Brooklyn" battleship sandwich (The Black Sheep, Richmond, VA).
6	"Northwest"	July 11, 2012
Richman visits the Pacific Northwest to sample the region's best sandwiches. Featured sandwiches include: a braised oxtail sandwich, featuring oxtail stewed in marinara sauce with two house-made sauces (breadcrumb olive oil and parsley caper) and topped with sauteed onions and peppers at Salumi (run by Mario Batali's sister, Gina) in Seattle, Washington; the "Big-Ass Roast-Beef", a massive sandwich loaded with 1/4 lb roast beef, bacon, onions, cheddar cheese Béchamel sauce, hot sauce, and stuffed with two layers of hand-cut fries at the Big-Ass Sandwiches cart in Portland, Oregon; and the "Pork-Belly Cubano" sandwich, a non-traditional Cubano filled with Italian spiced and molasses rubbed pork belly, ham, pickles, aged swiss cheese and topped with mayo, yellow mustard and Mexican hot sauce at Bunk Sandwiches, also in Portland. Winner: Big-Ass Sandwiches' Big-Ass Roast Beef sandwich Sandwiches that were left behind: None
7	"West Coast"	July 18, 2012
Richman continues his sandwich-eating quest on the west coast of California. Featured sandwiches include: a Memphis-style 15-spice-rubbed pulled pork sandwich topped with a maple syrup-and-pineapple-sweetened coleslaw, plus piping hot barbecue sauce, all inside a grilled Brioche bun at JR's Barbeque in Los Angeles, California; the "El Toro", a sandwich of Mesquite-grilled tri-tip beef, double-grilled and doused in a sweet barbecue sauce while placed inside a fresh-baked Kaiser roll, at Phil's BBQ in San Diego, California; and a "pulled" lamb sandwich topped with pickled watermelon rind, placed inside a sweet deli roll and served with a side of red cabbage slaw and a unique watermelon vinegar sauce from Wexler's in San Francisco, California. Winner: Phil's BBQ's "El Toro" barbecue tri-tip sandwich Sandwiches that were left behind: "The Fried Chicken Benedict" (Hash House a go go, Las Vegas, NV) and the "Kryptonite" (Ike's Place, San Francisco, CA)
8	"Great Lakes"	July 25, 2012
Richman heads to the Great Lakes region to sample their best sandwiches. Featured sandwiches include: the "Fish Taco Torta", a tempura-style cornstarch-breaded/beer battered mahi-mahi filet stacked with a habanero-lime mayonnaise, pico de gallo, a cabbage-and-peppadew pepper slaw, and crispy tortilla chips, all inside a milk bread bun, at Tilia in Minneapolis, Minnesota; a flame-grilled and sliced prime rib sandwich with melted Swiss cheese, a buttery mushroom-and-pepper relish, topped with two pads of butter, all stuffed into a toasted Semolina roll and served with a side of au jus, at Kroll's West in Green Bay, Wisconsin; and "The Yardbird", a sandwich combining boneless hickory-smoked Amish chicken (cooked with sautéed mushrooms and a mustard-based barbecue sauce), shredded cheddar cheese and applewood-smoked bacon in a toasted poppy-seed bun, at Slows Bar-B-Q in Detroit, Michigan. Winner: Slows Bar-B-Q's "Yardbird" chicken sandwich Sandwiches that were left behind: The "Triple Play Reuben" (Maize & Blue Deli, Ann Arbor, MI), the "Hear-O-Israel" (Benji's Deli, Milwaukee, WI), and the "Melt Grilled Cheese" (Melt Bar and Grilled, Lakewood, OH)
9	"Southwest"	August 1, 2012
Richman travels to the American Southwest region to try their best sandwiches. Featured sandwiches include: the Bar-B-Que Brisket Jalapeño Sandwich, a creation combining a 1/2-pound of open pit-barbecued beef brisket and pickled jalapeño peppers, both drenched in a spicy Habanero sauce, at The Salt Lick in Driftwood, Texas; a seared beef tongue sandwich with garlic aioli, a red pepper relish, and smoked green onions, all between grilled fresh home-baked bread, at the Noble Pig in Austin, Texas; and a Mexican torta known as the "Torta Del Rey", which features a Telera roll stuffed with a staggering 12 ingredients (slow-roasted pork, breaded beef sirloin, ham, melted mozzarella cheese, an omelet filled with Mexican chorizo and a hot dog, tomatoes, onions, avocado, all topped with peruano beans and chipotle sauce) at Los Reyes de la Torta in Phoenix, Arizona. Winner: The Noble Pig's seared beef tongue sandwich Sandwiches that were left behind: None
10	"New England"	August 8, 2012
Richman's quest concludes in New England when he tries its best sandwiches. Featured sandwiches include: the "Crab Grilled Cheese", a sandwich featuring toasted Ciabatta bread filled with melted Vermont sharp cheddar and a mound of lump Jonah crab, with the sandwich first grilled then oven-baked, and served with a side of potato chips and tomato soup, at Jumpin' Jay's Fish Cafe in Portsmouth, New Hampshire; the "Zesty Lemon Lobster Roll", a creation packing cold Maine lobster meat with mayonnaise, Romaine lettuce, and a lemon-pepper spice topping, all squirted with lemon and placed inside a butter-grilled New England-style bun, at The Galley Restaurant & Pub in Naples, Maine; and "A Tale of Two Turkeys", sage-buttered oven-roasted turkey with swiss cheese, coleslaw, and homemade Russian dressing on onion rye batard bread at the Book Trader Cafe in the heart of the Yale campus in New Haven, Connecticut. Winner: The Galley's Zesty Lemon Lobster Roll Sandwiches that were left behind: None
11	"Championship finale"	August 15, 2012
Ten regional sandwich winners and two wild cards go head-to-head, elimination-style. In the end, only one can take the coveted title of "Adam's Richman's Best Sandwich in America". **Wild Card #1** (Recommended by G. Love): Cheesesteak with 3/4-pound sliced beef, five slices of provolone cheese, "long hots" (hot peppers), and fried onions all topped with mayo and ketchup on a sesame seed Italian roll from John's Roast Pork in Philadelphia, Pennsylvania. **Wild Card #2** (Viewer's Choice): Duck Confit Grilled Cheese with white American and gruyere cheeses and sliced green tomatoes between two slices of grilled sourdough bread from Olio Soups, Salads & Sandwiches in Jacksonville, Florida. Note: These matchups were randomly decided by a computer. And the three chefs (DiNic's, Zunzi's & Slows Bar-B-Q) of the final three sandwiches were present at the time of the winner announcement. (Winners in bold) Round 1: "El Toro" (Phil's BBQ) vs. **"Yardbird" (Slows Bar-B-Q)**; **Seared beef tongue sandwich (Noble Pig)** vs. "C.S.S. Virginia" (The Black Sheep); "Zesty Lemon Lobster Roll" (The Galley) vs. **Cheesesteak (John's Roast Pork)**; Italian beef sandwich (Al's Beef) vs. **Chicken Conquistador (Zunzi's)**; Fried shrimp po'boy (Domilise's) vs. **Roast pork sandwich (Tommy DiNic's)**; **"Big-Ass Roast Beef" (Big-Ass Sandwiches)** vs. Duck confit grilled cheese (Olio); Round 2: Cheesesteak vs. **"Yardbird"**; Seared beef tongue sandwich vs. **Chicken Conquistador**; **Roast pork sandwich** vs. "Big-Ass Roast Beef"; Final Round: Adam invites the top three restaurants' head chefs to create their signature sandwiches on the spot for one final taste test.: **Roast pork sandwich** vs. Chicken Conquistador vs. "Yardbird"; **"Adam's Richman's Best Sandwich in America" champion**: Tommy DiNic's roast pork sandwich

== Brackets ==
=== Northeast ===
Round 1
Primanti Bros.	LOSS
Tommy DiNic's	WIN
Tommy DiNic's	WIN
Katz's	LOSS

Final
Northeast Champ
Tommy DiNic's	WIN

=== Gulf Coast ===
Round 1
Domilise's	WIN
Aguila's	LOSS
Domilise's	WIN
Skipper's	LOSS

Final
Gulf Coast Champ
Domilise's	WIN

=== South ===
Round 1
Mitchell	WIN
Time-Out	LOSS
Mitchell	LOSS
Zunzi's	WIN

Final
South Champ
Zunzi's	WIN

=== Midwest ===
Round 1
Fifty/50	LOSS
Al's Beef	WIN
Al's Beef	WIN
Crown Candy	LOSS

Final
Midwest Champ
Al's Beef	WIN

=== Mid-Atlantic ===
Round 1
Faidley's	LOSS
The W	WIN
The W	LOSS
Black Sheep	WIN

Final
Mid-Atlantic Champ
Black Sheep	WIN

=== Northwest ===
Round 1
Salumi	LOSS
Big-Ass Sandwiches	WIN
Big-Ass Sandwiches	WIN
Bunk	LOSS

Final
Northwest Champ
Big-Ass Sandwiches	WIN

=== West Coast ===
Round 1
JR's Barbeque	LOSS
Phil's BBQ	WIN
Phil's BBQ	WIN
Wexler's	LOSS

Final
West Coast Champ
Phil's BBQ	WIN

=== Great Lakes ===
Round 1
Tilia	WIN
Kroll's West	LOSS
Tilia	LOSS
Slows Bar-B-Q	WIN

Final
Great Lakes Champ
Slows Bar-B-Q	WIN

=== Southwest ===
Round 1
The Salt Lick	LOSS
Noble Pig	WIN
Noble Pig	WIN
Los Reyes de la Torta	LOSS

Final
Southwest Champ
Noble Pig	WIN

=== New England ===
Round 1
Jumpin' Jay's	LOSS
The Galley	WIN
The Galley	WIN
Book Trader Cafe	LOSS

Final
New England Champ
The Galley	WIN

=== Championship finale ===
Round 1
El Toro (West Coast)	LOSS
Yardbird (Great Lakes)	WIN
Seared Beef Tongue (Southwest)	WIN
CSS Virginia (Mid-Atlantic)	LOSS
Lobster Roll (New England)	LOSS
Cheesesteak (Wild Card)	WIN
Shrimp Po'Boy (Gulf Coast)	LOSS
Roast Pork (Northeast)	WIN

Round 2
Yardbird	WIN
Cheesesteak	LOSS
Seared Beef Tongue	LOSS
Chicken Conquistador	WIN

Final
Best Sandwich in America Champ
Tommy DiNic's Roast Pork	WIN

Round 1
Chicken Conquistador (Mid-Atlantic)	WIN
Italian Beef (Midwest)	LOSS
Big-Ass Roast Beef (Northwest)	WIN
Duck Confit Grilled Cheese (Wild Card)	LOSS

Round 2
Roast Pork	WIN
Big-Ass Roast Beef	LOSS
