= The Vortex Bar & Grill =

Restaurant in Atlanta

Coordinates: 33°46′44″N 84°23′4″W

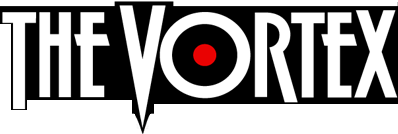
- Interactive map of The Vortex Bar & Grill

Restaurant information
- Established: 1992
- Location: Atlanta, Georgia
- Website: thevortexatl.com

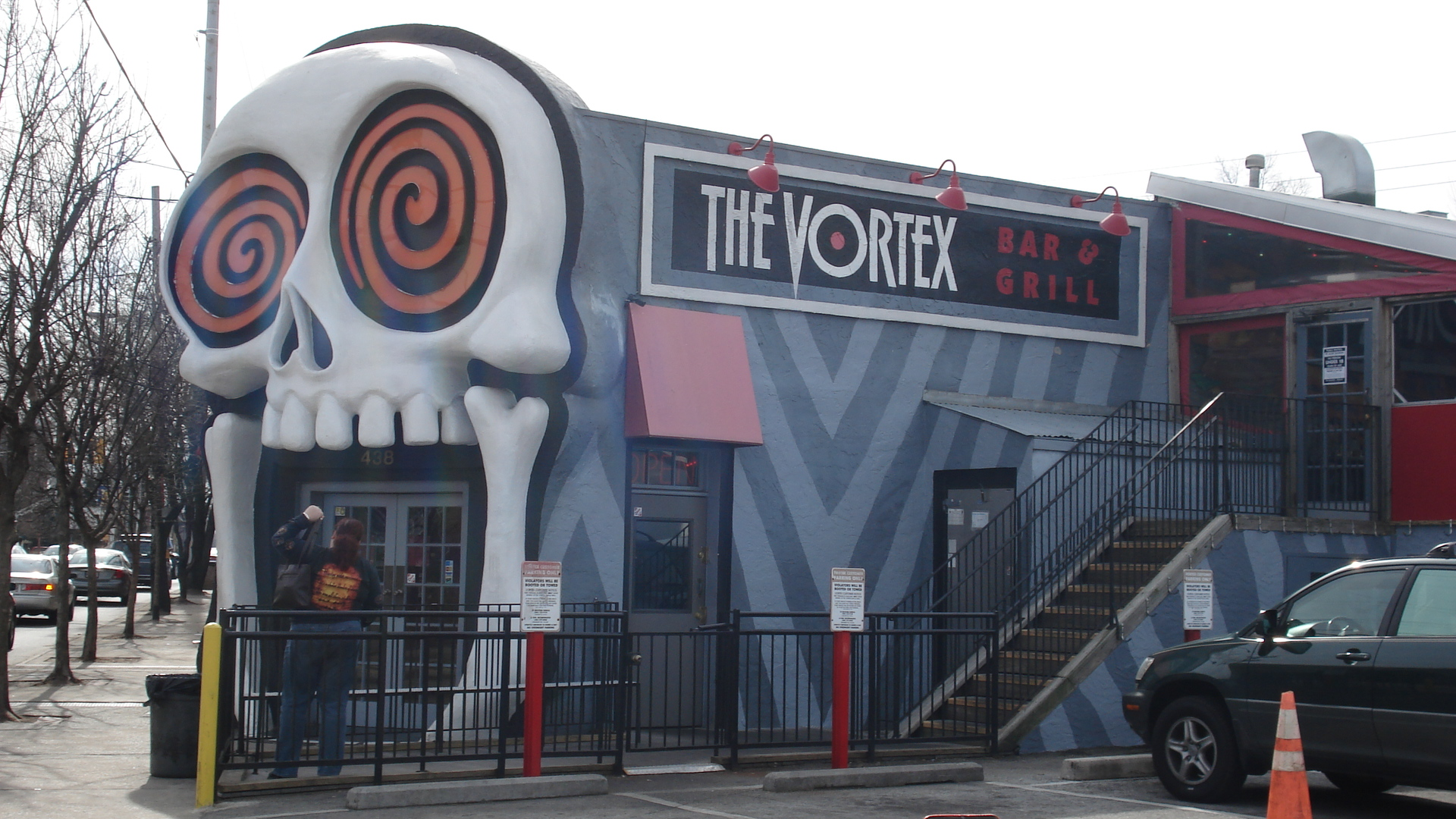
The Little Five Points Vortex

The Vortex Bar and Grill is a restaurant in Atlanta, Georgia, with two locations, in Midtown on Peachtree Street, originally opened in 1992, and Little Five Points, opened in 1996 and distinguished by the large "Laughing Skull" entrance. The restaurant is famous for its burgers and has been featured on Season 1 of the Travel Channel's Man vs. Food.

More recently, the Midtown location has also become the home of the Laughing Skull Lounge, a small comedy club and theatre.

== In Pop Culture ==
- The Little Five Points restaurant appears as a meeting place in Frost Moon by Anthony Francis.
- It also appears in Charity Langley's fictional novel Wicked Intentions as the main character's favorite restaurant.
- It also appears in the 2005 racing game Midnight Club 3 Dub Edition as landmark in Atlanta
