= Old North St. Louis =

Neighborhood of St. Louis in Missouri, US

Coordinates: 38.6492°N 90.1960°W

- Neighborhood of St. Louis
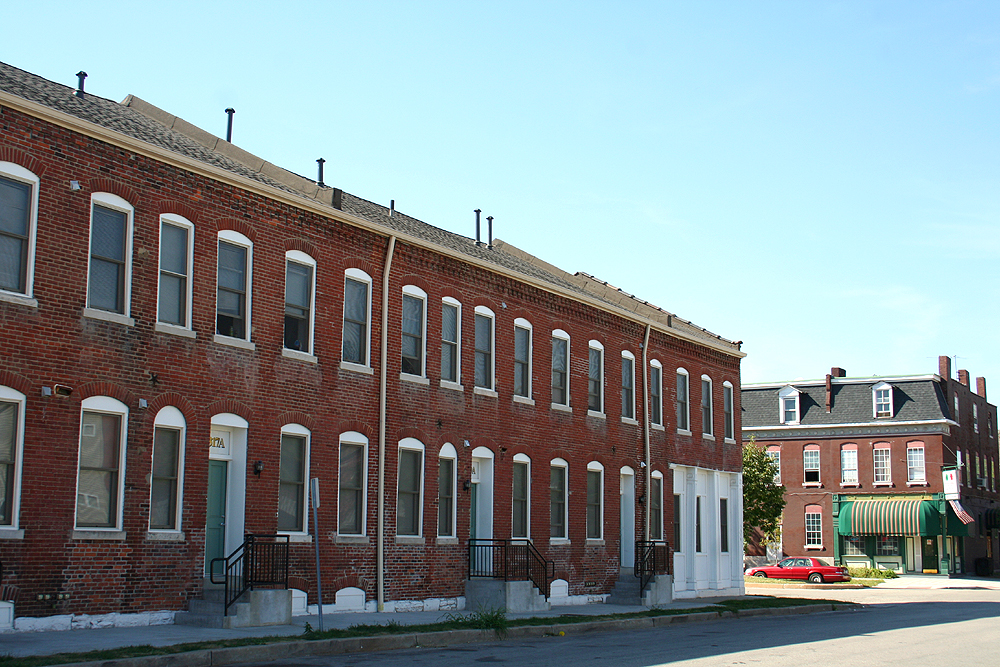
- Terraced houses in Old North St. Louis

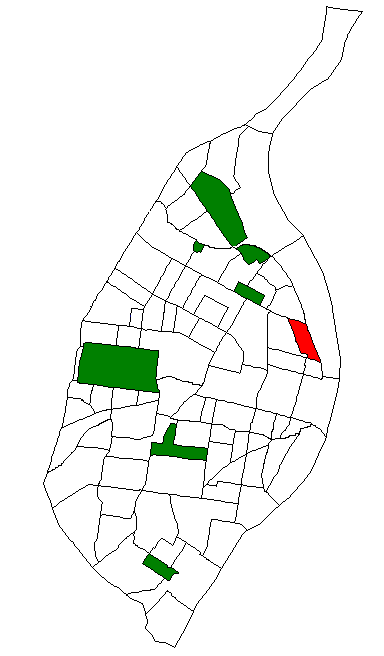
- Location (red) of Old North St. Louis within St. Louis
- Country: United States
- State: Missouri
- City: St. Louis
- Ward: 14

Government
  - Alderman: Rasheen Aldridge

Area
  - Total: 0.39 sq mi (1.0 km^{2})

Population (2020)
  - Total: 1,488
  - Density: 3,800/sq mi (1,500/km^{2})
- ZIP Codes: Part of 63106 and part of 63107
- Area code: 314
- Website: stlouis-mo.gov

Old North St. Louis is a neighborhood just north and slightly west of the downtown area of St. Louis, Missouri. It is known for Crown Candy Kitchen, historic 19th-century brick homes, and its community gardens.

== History ==
The neighborhood, now known as Old North St. Louis, was established as the independent village of North St. Louis in 1816 and was annexed by the City of St. Louis in 1841. In the mid 19th century, part of Old North St. Louis was predominantly Irish in population; that section was known as Kerry Patch. After being a densely populated neighborhood, Old North St. Louis gradually lost its population over decades and had its community housing stocks deteriorated. In the late 20th and early 21st centuries, the neighborhood was active.

Three separate National Register Historic Districts are located within the boundaries of Old North St. Louis. In the portion of the neighborhood north of St. Louis Avenue, dozens of homes have been renovated by individuals and families over the past 25 years. Along North Market Street and one block to the south along Monroe Avenue, new homes have been built. Large, formerly crumbling, historic buildings have been renovated as apartments.

A 27 building, $35 million redevelopment of the former 14th Street pedestrian mall was to be built in partnership with Old North St. Louis Restoration Group, a neighborhood association. In 2013, the project lost federal funding.

== Education ==
Schools include Ames Visual and Performing Arts magnet school and Confluence Academy charter school.

== Churches ==
The neighborhood is home to several churches, such as Saints Cyril & Methodius Polish National Catholic Church, Fourth Baptist Church, Greater Leonard Missionary Baptist, True Gospel Temple, Revival Center Church of God in Christ, and Parrish Temple CME.

== Mullanphy Emigrant Home ==
Among the neighborhood's landmark structures was the Mullanphy Emigrant Home building, constructed in 1867 using funds from the estate of mayor Bryan Mullanphy to provide temporary shelter and supportive services to the thousands of immigrants who settled in St. Louis during the years after the Civil War. The home burned to the ground on September 14, 2023.

== Demographics ==
According to the 2020 census, the neighborhood's population was 82.5% Black, 12.8% White, 0.1% Native American, 0.1% Asian, 4.3% two or more races, and 0.3% other races. 1.1% of the population was of Hispanic and/or Latino origin.

Historical population
Year	Pop.	±%
1990	2,388	—
2000	1,654	−30.7%
2010	1,916	+15.8%
2020	1,488	−22.3%

== Sources ==
- "NRHP Nomination Form - Murphy-Blair District" (PDF). Missouri Department of Natural Resources.
- "NRHP Nomination Form - Mullanphy Historic District" (PDF). Missouri Department of Natural Resources.
