= Ed Mitchell (pitmaster) =

American pitmaster and businessman

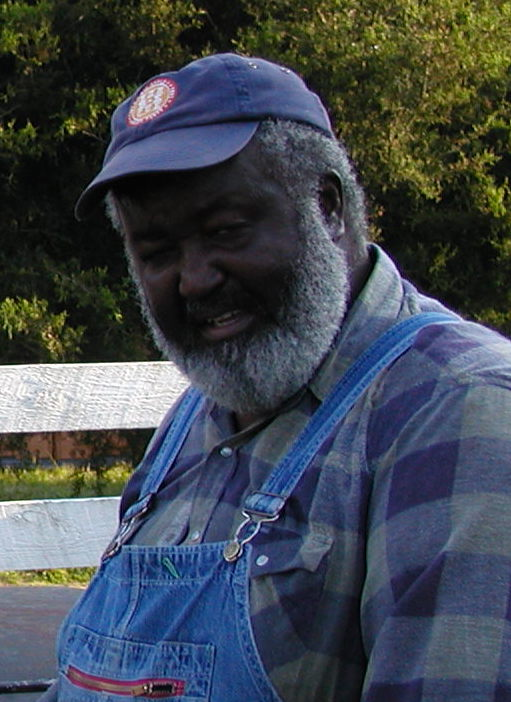
- Ed Mitchell in 2008
- Born: 1948 or 1949 (age 77–78); North Carolina, U.S.
- Citizenship: United States
- Occupation: Pitmaster
- Website: www.thepitmasteredmitchell.com

Ed Mitchell (born 1948 or 1949) is an American pitmaster and businessman. Mitchell's frequent media appearances and advocacy for the use of heritage breed pork has earned him the title of the most "famous pitmaster" in North Carolina. Mitchell has appeared in Bon Appetit and on Throwdown! with Bobby Flay, Man v. Food, and National Geographic.

== Early life ==
Ed Mitchell grew up in Wilson, North Carolina. He learned about barbecue from his family, who frequently held large family gatherings.

When Mitchell was 14 or 15 years old, he attended a family barbecue. It was attended by his father, uncles, grandfather and other male relatives. The family passed around moonshine and eventually, the adults fell asleep. Mitchell began tending to the barbecue fire. His grandfather woke up and saw a cooked pig in the barbecue and when he asked who cooked it. Mitchell acknowledged he did. Mitchell thought he was going to be chastised by his grandfather. Instead, his grandfather grabbed the bottle of moonshine and gave Mitchell a glass to celebrate - it was his first alcoholic beverage and his first time barbecuing.

== Cuisine ==
Mitchell specializes in whole hog barbecue. Mitchell uses traditional techniques for his barbecue, including using oak and hickory logs, in addition to charcoal briquettes. His rub comprises salt, black pepper, red pepper, and onion powder. His barbecue sauce comprises apple cider vinegar, crushed red pepper, salt, sugar and black pepper. He cooks "hot and fast" with a bank of coals surrounding the hog. He closes the barbecue vents and will let the hog smoke overnight. He will smoke a hog starting at 500 degrees, lowering the temperature to 250 gradually.

Mitchell prefers whole hog because it allows one to taste "all the different parts." For example, to prepare a pulled pork sandwich, Mitchell will smoke a whole hog, believing that a proper pulled pork sandwich requires a blend of shoulder, ham, and belly meat.

== Career ==
In the 1990s, he started selling his barbecue at his family's grocery store in Wilson. In 2004, the business closed after Mitchell was accused of failing to pay state taxes for the store.

Mitchell co-founded The Pit in Raleigh. He left The Pit in 2011. In 2014, he opened Que in the American Tobacco Campus in Durham. Que closed in 2015 after less than one year of operation. Mitchell said the space did not enable him to barbecue more than one hog a day, which did not provide him the opportunity to maximize restaurant and catering sales. In 2019, Mitchell announced he would open a new restaurant, The Preserve, in Raleigh in partnership with his son Ryan Mitchell and LM Restaurants. The restaurant is slated to focus on the history of barbecue in North Carolina and will use pigs raised specifically for barbecue. He also operates a food truck called Q on Wheels. In 2018, he started selling his barbecue through Goldbelly. The barbecue is prepared at a smokehouse in Micro, North Carolina.

In 2020, Mitchell created three barbecue sauces for True Made Foods.
