= Grill-A-Burger =

Restaurant in Palm Desert, California, U.S.

- Interactive map of Grill-A-Burger

Restaurant information
- Location: Palm Desert, California, United States
- Coordinates: 33°45′25.7″N 116°23′24.7″W

Grill-A-Burger is a hamburger restaurant in Palm Desert, California, United States. The business was featured on the Food Network's Diners, Drive-Ins & Dives in 2017. The interior decor has a jungle theme and features gorillas. In addition to burgers, the menu has included hot dogs and avocado fries.
