= Adam Richman =

American actor and television host

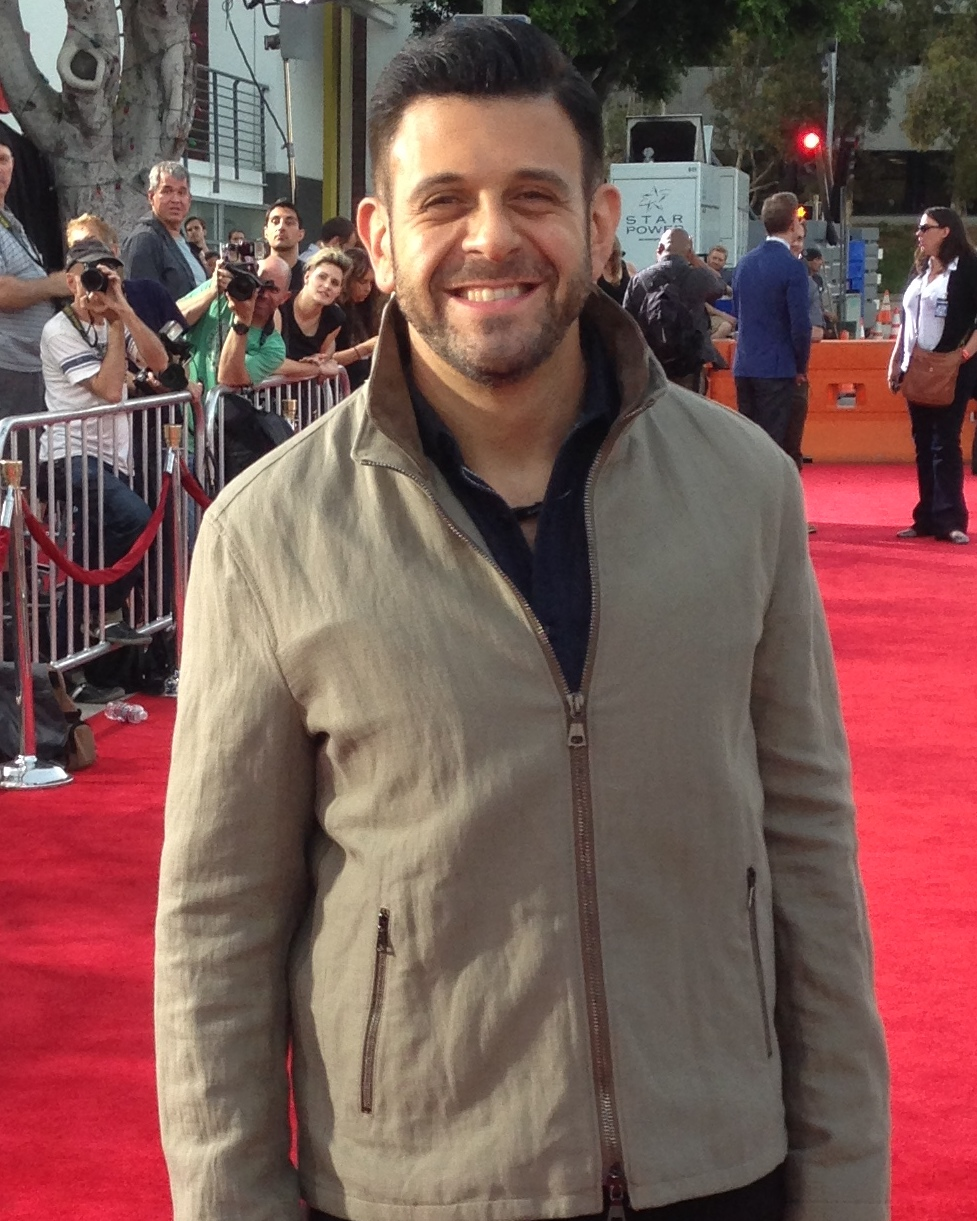
- Richman in 2014
- Born: Adam Montgomery Richman; New York City, U.S.
- Education: Emory University (BA); Yale University (MFA)
- Occupations: Actor, television host
- Years active: 1995–present

Adam Montgomery Richman is an American actor and television host. He has hosted various dining and eating-challenge programs on the Travel Channel, History Channel, and Discovery+.

== Early life and education ==
Richman, an only child, was born into a Jewish family in the New York City borough of Brooklyn, and raised in the Sheepshead Bay neighborhood. He attended "a Solomon Schechter school through eighth grade and then a Talmud Torah high school", ultimately graduating from Midwood High School. He completed his undergraduate degree in international studies at Emory University, and earned a master's degree from the Yale School of Drama. While attending Emory, Richman was a member of Alpha Epsilon Pi fraternity.

== Career ==
=== Early acting career ===
Richman's acting career has included guest roles on Guiding Light, All My Children, Law & Order: Trial by Jury, and he portrayed God as a butcher on Joan of Arcadia in 2004. In addition to appearing in regional theater productions throughout the United States, he was also seen in several national television commercials.

=== Food expertise and travel journal ===
As a self-educated food expert and trained sushi chef, Richman has kept a travel journal that includes every restaurant he has visited since 1995.

=== Man v. Food (2008–2012) ===
Richman began as a TV host in 2008, with the Travel Channel show Man v. Food, which shows Richman visiting various cities and taking part in eating challenges there. Richman's tenure on the show lasted for four seasons, until 2012. (It was revived in 2017 with a new host, Casey Webb.) To maintain his health while taping the show, Richman would exercise twice a day. When the schedule permitted, he would not eat the day before a challenge. He also tried to stay hydrated by drinking a lot of water or club soda and forgoing coffee and soft drinks. For the show's fourth season, it was re-titled Man v. Food Nation, and Richman did not engage in the eating challenges himself, but rather coached others to do so. He stated at the time that this change was not done because he wanted to avoid eating large amounts of food, but rather in order to keep the show interesting.

Richman wrote the book America the Edible: A Hungry History from Sea to Dining Sea, which was released on November 9, 2010, by Rodale Publishing.

On January 23, 2011, Richman appeared on Food Network's Iron Chef America as a judge for a battle with Gruyère as the theme ingredient.

Richman hosted Travel Channel's The Traveler's Guide to Life, which debuted on January 26, 2011, and Amazing Eats, a spin-off of his popular series Man v. Food and Man v. Food Nation, which premiered on January 11, 2012.

=== Post Man v. Food (2012–2014) ===
During his time as a competitive eater, Richman gained a considerable amount of weight and became depressed. After retiring from competitive eating, he lost 60 pounds (27 kg). Richman was a paid spokesman for Zantac during Season 3 of Man v. Food.

=== Adam Richman's Best Sandwich in America (2012) ===
Richman also hosted the TV series Adam Richman's Best Sandwich in America which premiered June 6, 2012. This 11-episode weekly series documented Richman's "nationwide quest to find the best thing since sliced bread 'on' sliced bread." He ultimately declared the roast-pork sandwich from Tommy DiNic's in Philadelphia's Reading Terminal Market his "Best Sandwich in America".

=== Fandemonium and Food Fighters (2013–2015) ===
Richman hosted the Travel Channel's Adam Richman's Fandemonium, which ran for one season in 2013; the series showed him taking part in various fan events around the United States, such as sporting competitions. He hosted the NBC cooking competition show Food Fighters, which ran for two seasons from 2014 to 2015.

=== Instagram controversy and vegan diet (2014–2015) ===
In June 2014, Richman posted a photo of his newly svelte physique on Instagram and boasted about his 70-pound weight loss, adding the hashtag "#thinspiration". The post caused controversy because this hashtag was said to be linked to eating disorders. Some Instagram users responded with criticism of the hashtag, and Richman responded to some of them with insults, referring to them as "haters" and telling one to "grab a razor blade & draw a bath". He later apologized, but the Travel Channel postponed Richman's series Man Finds Food, which was meant to begin airing in July 2014, until April 2015. In 2015, Richman told The Independent that he eats a vegan diet when training for soccer. Also in 2015, Richman was a judge on the British television series BBQ Champ, hosted by Myleene Klass and broadcast on ITV.

=== Recent work (2019–present) ===
Richman is a leading contributor on the History network's The Food That Built America, which began airing in 2019. In February 2021, he began hosting the History series Modern Marvels and the next year began hosting Adam Eats the 80s.

In March 2024, Adam Richman Eats Britain premiered on Discovery+ in the UK.

In October 2024, Richman started a collaboration with First We Feast called Pro Moves on their YouTube channel.

== Filmography ==
Year	Title	Role	Notes
2004	Joan of Arcadia	Butcher God	CBS (USA)
2004	All My Children	Andy	ABC (USA)
2006	My Ex Life	Cafe Patron	uncredited
2006	Law & Order: Trial by Jury	Officer Marty Cataldo	NBC (USA)
2006	Guiding Light	Lurker	CBS (USA)
2008–2012	Man v. Food	Himself/host	Travel Channel (USA)
2009	The Tonight Show with Conan O'Brien	Himself	NBC (USA)
2011	Iron Chef America	Himself/ICA Judge	Food Network (USA)
2011	The Traveler's Guide to Life	Himself/host	Travel Channel (USA)
2011	Man v. Food Nation	Himself/host	Travel Channel (USA)
2012	Amazing Eats	Himself/host	Travel Channel (USA)
2012	Adam Richman's Best Sandwich in America	Himself/host	Travel Channel (USA)
2013	Epic Meal Time	Himself/guest	YouTube
2013	Adam Richman's Fandemonium	Himself/host	Travel Channel (USA)
2013	Last Call with Carson Daly	Himself	NBC (USA)
2014	The Trip: 2014	Himself/host	Travel Channel (USA)
2014	Sunday Brunch	Himself/guest	Channel 4 (UK)
2014–2015	Food Fighters	Himself/host	NBC (USA)
2014–2017	Man Finds Food	Himself/host	Travel Channel (USA)
2015	BBQ Champ	Himself/judge	ITV (UK)
2015	Celebrity Juice	Himself/guest	ITV (UK)
2021–2024	The Food That Built America (seasons 2–5)	Himself/guest	History Channel (USA)
2021-2023	The Toys That Built America	Himself	History Channel (USA)
2021	Modern Marvels	Himself/host	History Channel (USA)
2022	Adam Eats the 80s	Himself/host	History Channel (USA)
2023-2024	The Mega-Brands That Built America	Himself/host	History Channel (USA)
2024–present	Adam Richman Eats Britain	Himself/host	Discovery+ (UK), Cooking Channel (USA)
2024	James Martin's Saturday Morning	Himself/guest	1 episode, ITV (UK)
2024	Adam Richman Eats Football	Himself/host	Discovery+ (UK)
2026	Adam Richman Eats Italy	Himself/host	Travel Channel (USA)

== Personal life ==
Richman is a fan of the baseball team New York Yankees, soccer teams Tottenham Hotspur and Grimsby Town, and American football team Miami Dolphins (especially its Hall of Fame quarterback, Dan Marino).

On June 8, 2014, Richman represented the "Rest of the World" team in the annual Soccer Aid match against England at Old Trafford, Manchester, in a game that combined former professional players and celebrities. Richman was quoted as saying that he lost 30 kilograms (66 lb) for the game, and cried when he was asked to take part.

=== Ties to United Kingdom ===
Richman has a large fan base in the UK and has been appearing on shows in the region for the past 10 years. In 2024, he remarked: "I think globally British food is largely misunderstood and maybe unfairly maligned… We acknowledge Spain's impact on food, Japan's impact on food, Italy's impact on food – all of which are profound – but people slag off Britain. Then you stop and you go, the sandwich has roots here, Cheddar has roots here, Angus beef has roots in Britain."

==== English football ====
In June 2020 Richman became a shareholder in English football club Grimsby Town; he had also previously put money into the club via a fan fundraising scheme called "Operation Promotion".

==== Theft ====
On October 23, 2024, while filming the second series of Adam Richman Eats Britain for Discovery+, Richman's belongings were stolen from a vehicle at the London Gateway Services on the M1 in Barnet. After wrapping up filming on November 14 in Tottenham, North London, Richman received a notification via the Tile tracker app that his keys were nearby, around Muswell Hill Playing Fields. After three hours, with the help of a bodyguard, they were able to recover the items Richman valued most, including a book from his mother and a birthday card from his deceased father. Richman commented on the incident, noting the presence of both negative and positive elements in the situation.
