= Cuisine of Minnesota =

Cuisine of the state of Minnesota

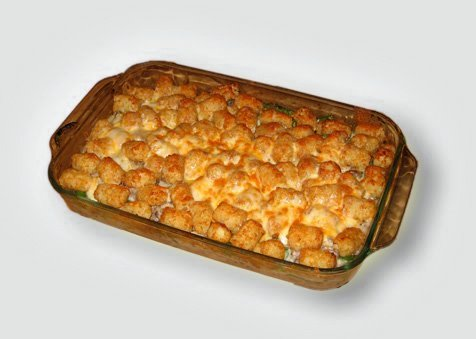
A tater tot hotdish

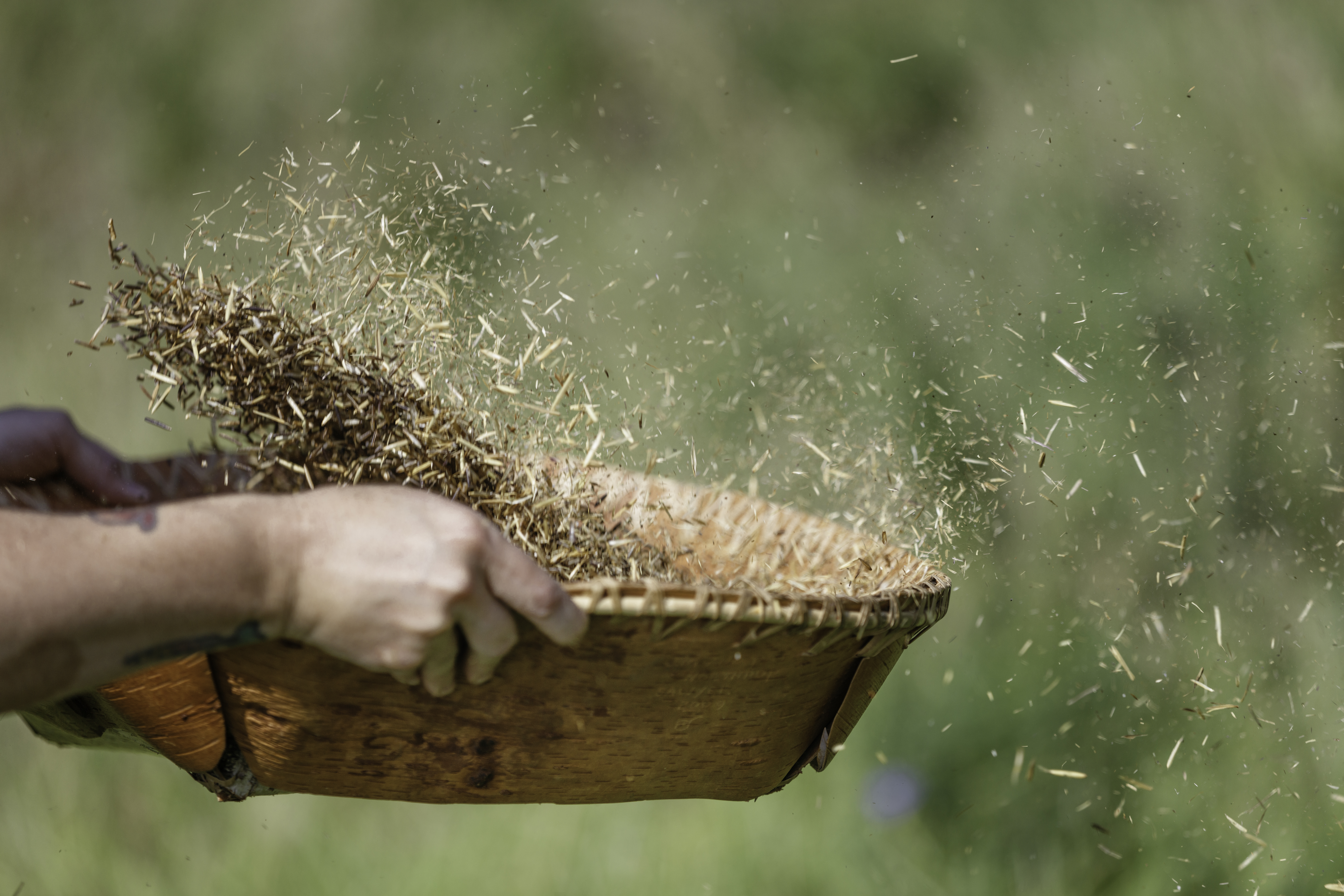
Wild rice, a staple grain and the state grain of Minnesota

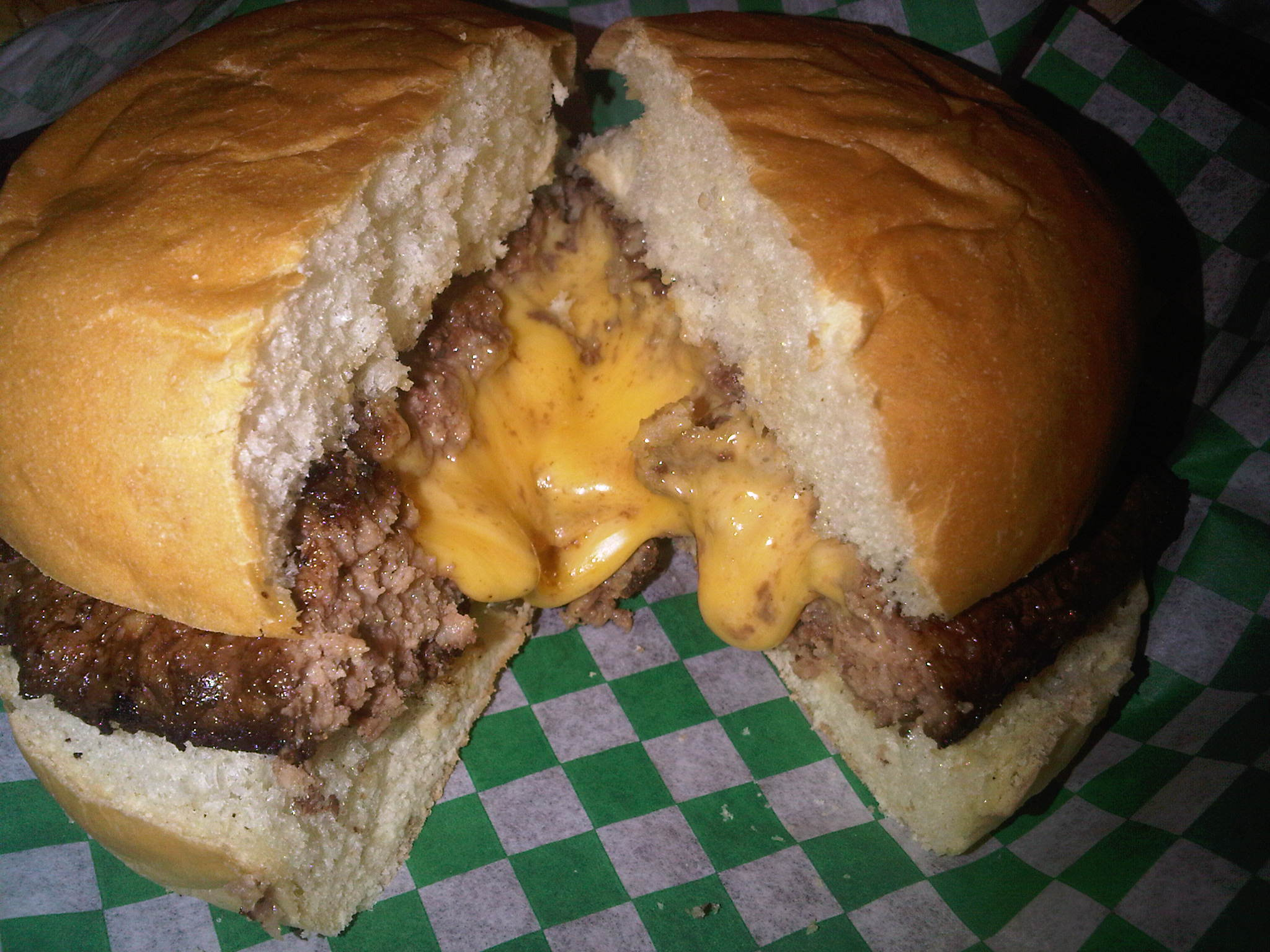
A Jucy Lucy, invented in Minneapolis

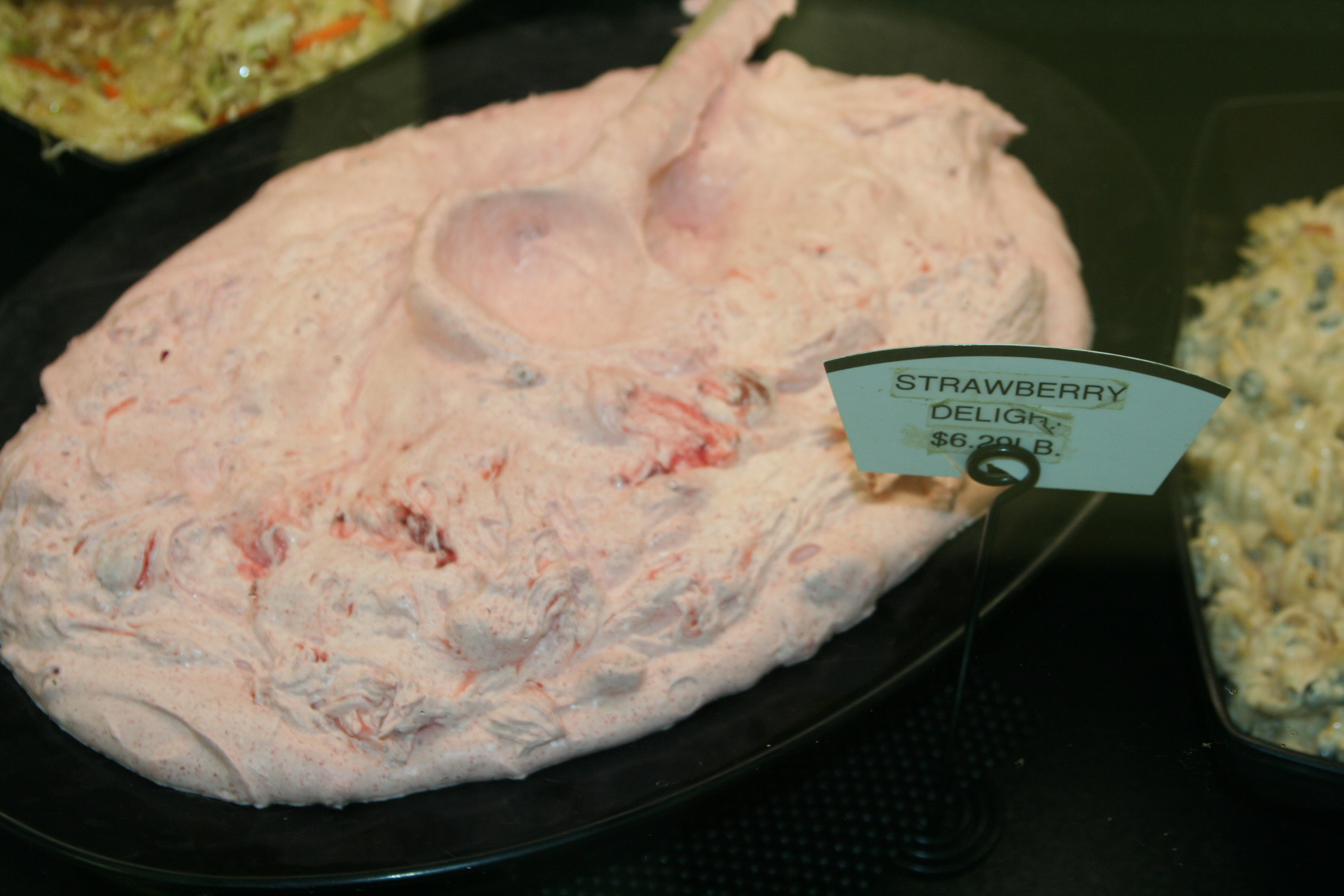
Strawberry delight, a dessert salad common in Minnesota

The cuisine of Minnesota refers to the food traditions, cooking techniques, dishes, and ingredients found throughout the state of Minnesota. It is a unique type of Midwestern cuisine, made distinct by its heavy Nordic influence.

Typical Minnesota cuisine is based on 19th-century Norwegian and Swedish cuisine, with influence from German, Czech, Cornish, Italian, and Polish cuisine and minor Native American influences (mainly seen through the use of wild rice). Since the 1960s, food developed, produced, and sold in the Minneapolis–Saint Paul area, known as the "Twin Cities", has been influenced by the cuisines of immigrant and refugee groups that have settled in Minnesota; immigrant cuisines common in Minnesota include Thai, Hmong, Vietnamese, and Laotian cuisine. Minnesotan cuisine also has regional variations, such as fusion cuisine and New Nordic cuisine in the Twin Cities, which is home to the inventions of the Jucy Lucy and the Bundt cake. Italian-inspired dishes and Cornish pasties are common in the Iron Range, along with Eastern European and Scandinavian dishes. German influence is more prevalent on the western prairies. Lake fish is most common on the North Shore.

Dishes uniquely associated with Minnesota cuisine include hotdish, fried walleye, Jucy Lucys, wild rice soup, lutefisk, lefse, and desserts such as scotcheroos, dessert salads, kransekake, and baked apples. Minnesota is the namesake of Minnesota sushi, Minnesota goulash, and Minnesota-style pizza. Regionally, porketta, potica, and pasties are well-known dishes of the Iron Range.

Foods typical in Minnesota cuisine are generally affordable, filling, and hearty, befitting Minnesota's long, cold winters. The majority of dishes are comfort foods. Minnesotan foods are also rarely spicy. Though not typical Minnesota cuisine, archetypal fair foods are offered at the Minnesota State Fair, including dozens of foods offered "on a stick", such as Pronto Pups and deep-fried candy bars.

== Relation to Scandinavian cuisine ==
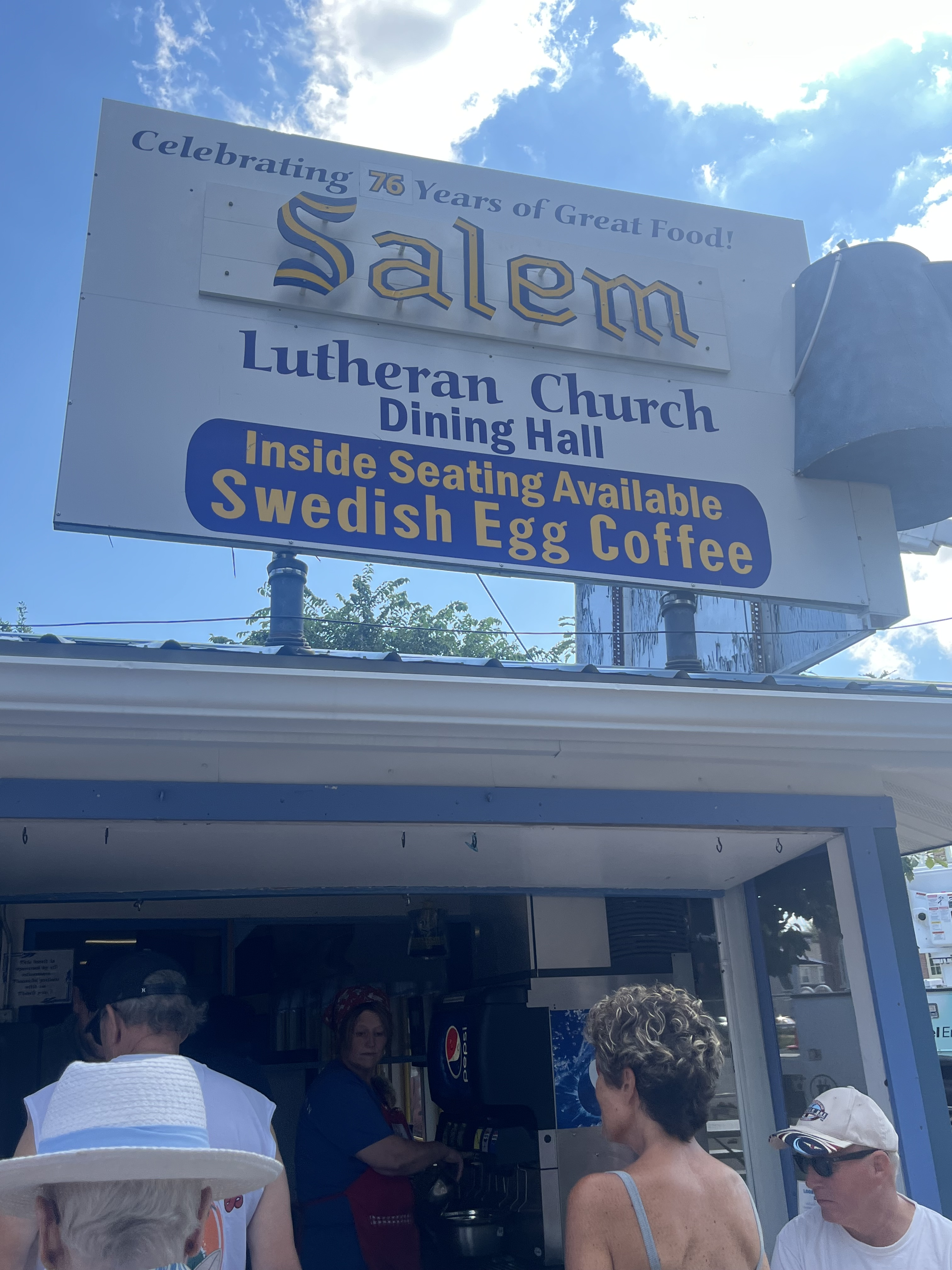
Swedish egg coffee served at the 2025 Minnesota State Fair

While Minnesotan cuisine and the cuisines of Scandinavian countries are quite similar, with the former being based upon the latter, there are several differences.

The aspects of Minnesotan cuisine that are of Scandinavian origin have remained largely unchanged over the centuries, leading to stark differences between modern Scandinavian cooking and Minnesotan cuisine. Dishes common in 19th-century Scandinavia such as lutefisk and egg coffee have either substantially decreased in popularity or have entirely disappeared from Scandinavia, while remaining common in Minnesota.

Extremely regional dishes in Scandinavia often get associated with the entirety, despite being relatively unknown. This is the case with potatiskorv, Swedish potato sausage, which comes from a specific region of Sweden, but is seen as representative of all of Sweden. Additionally, Some Swedish and Norwegian foodways have, by wide acceptance, become part of the local cuisine to a degree that they have shed most cultural associations with specific immigrant groups.

== History ==
=== 19th century ===
Letters and household accounts of Minnesota residents give details of mid-19th century frontier cuisine. A farmer's wife writes to her cousin about harvest in Rochester, Minnesota "My hand is so tired perhaps you'll excuse penciling", explaining she woke before four to skim milk, churn butter and bake "6 loaves of bread & seven pumpkin pies". In the 1850s, supplies could not keep pace with settlement, though steamboats regularly brought in sugar-cured hams, oysters, herring, sardines, alcohol, salt pork and other supplies. At that time, a full multi-course meal served for special occasions would have started with a typical soup, followed by a choice of local fish and so-called "boiled dishes", like chicken with egg sauce, ham or corned beef. Entrees were followed by assorted roast meats served with cranberry sauce. Early Minnesotans used cranberries in pies, molded desserts and frozen confections.

Dining in 19th century, Minnesota mainly revolved around boiled potatoes and meats. However, there was some variety; the Old Napoleon restaurant in St. Paul served beefsteaks, oysters, tripe, venison, and pigs' feet. Bakeries in Minneapolis such as Eagle Bakery offered fruitcake, pound cake and something called "Fancy cake" for the holidays. Asian cuisine was initially dominated by Chinese Cantonese immigrants that served Americanized offerings. In 1883 Woo Yee Sing and his younger brother, Woo Du Sing, opened the Canton Cafe in Minneapolis, the first Chinese restaurant in Minnesota.

Scandinavian settlers dominated migration in the late 1800s, bringing some of the state's most iconic dishes, lefse and lutefisk. In Norway, lefse has several regional varieties. In Minnesota, only potato lefse is widely consumed. This was caused by successful potato harvests by early Norwegian Minnesotan settlers. Potato lefse dominates so much in Minnesota it is sometimes referred to as Minnesota lefse.

Immigrants from Eastern Europe, arriving in the 19th century, opened delicatessens, bakeries and restaurants, and introduced dishes like varenyky, krakowska, poppy seed roll, kluski, kolaches and stuffed cabbage rolls to Minnesota. German immigrants brought kohlrabi with them. Slovenian and Croatian immigrants brought the honey-nut bread called potica to the Iron Range region, which is also known for Cornish pasties. Porketta, a pork roast seasoned with fennel and garlic and served with either sliced or shredded like a pulled pork sandwich was invented in Minnesota, specifically the Iron Range region by Italian immigrants.

=== 20th century ===
In the 1930s, there were four Jewish bakeries within a few blocks of each other in North Minneapolis baking bagels and other fresh breads. Jewish families purchased challah loaves for their Sabbath meal at the North Side Bakery. There were two kosher meat markets and four Jewish delicatessens, one of which began distribution for what would become Sara Lee frozen cheesecakes. The delis sold sandwiches like corned beef and salami.

German-Americans are by far the state's largest ethnic group. During early settlement, Minnesota's German-Americans were divided between secular Forty-Eighters and religiously active Germans, who included Roman Catholics, Lutherans, Jews, Mennonites, and Amish. But like their compatriots throughout the United States, Minnesota's German-Americans overwhelmingly chose to assimilate in response to persecution during World War I and, later, horror and shame over Nazi war crimes. This allowed Scandinavian culture and food to dominate in Minnesota.

Authentic Chinese offerings began at the influential Nankin Cafe which opened in 1919, and many new Chinese immigrants soon took this cuisine throughout the Twin Cities and to the suburbs. The cuisine of Japan has been present since the opening of the area's very first Japanese restaurant, Fuji Ya in 1959. Modern dining options include phở noodle shops, bánh mi and Thai curry restaurants. Local ingredients are often integrated into Asian offerings, for example Chinese steamed walleye and Nepalese curried bison.

In the 20th century, wild rice was an expensive ingredient, as such wild rice soup was created in order to use any leftover wild rice. The Jucy Lucy burger, a burger with a core of melted cheese, was invented in the 1950s.

==== The Great Depression ====
The Great Depression had profound effects on Minnesota food culture. The scarcity of ingredients led to a number of Minnesota's unique dishes to be created. Desserts such as dessert salads were invented around this time, along with jello salad. Most notably, hotdish was invented in the 1930s in Mankato. This dish secured its popularity during the Great Depression, when grocery budgets required creative preparations for cheap foods, and the popularity continued into the rationing during World War II. It was likely preceded by an American dish known as "hot pot."

=== 21st century ===
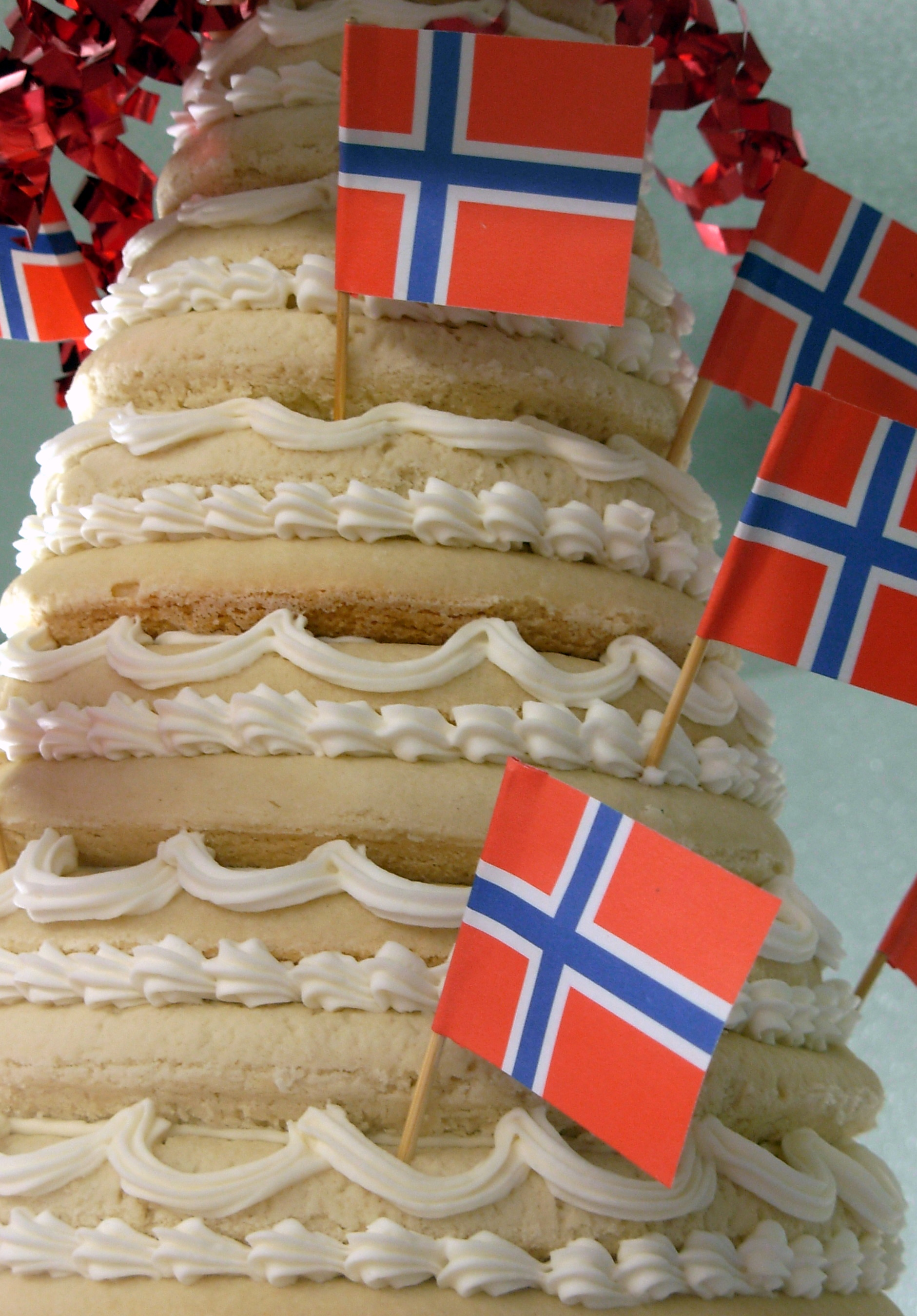
Kransekake cake decorated with small flags of Norway at the Olmsted County Fair in Rochester, Minnesota.

The 21st century saw increased diversity of Minnesota's food scene, particularly in the Twin Cities. This was driven by the plethora of immigrant groups that emigrated. American restaurants in the Twin Cities supply a wide spectrum of choices and styles that range from small diners, sports bars and decades-old supper clubs to high-end steakhouses and eateries that serve new American cuisine using locally grown ingredients. Minnesota barbecue was a food movement blending various styles of barbecue from around the United States. The Twin Cities saw a large influx of Southeast Asian immigrants from Cambodia, Laos, Thailand and Vietnam, the largest of these groups was the Hmong people. They brought the tradition of Hmong sausage to Minnesota, along with establishing the Hmongtown Marketplace. Scandinavian dining was revitalized through the New Nordic Cuisine movement. Despite the new culinary influences on Minnesota, its base of Swedish and Norwegian home cooking remains strong.

== Dishes ==
=== Appetizers and side dishes ===
Mashed potatoes and gravy, asparagus, and green beans are Minnesota staples, often eaten at Thanksgiving or large dinners. Typical sides include pickles, locally grown boiled new potatoes seasoned with fresh herbs or horseradish, baked beans, corn on the cob, sauerkraut, and vegetables such as buttered peas, and carrots. Preferred to rice or pasta, potatoes are often served alongside buttered rolls and homemade strawberry jam. Potatoes are also served as tater tots, home fries, or mashed. Mashed rutabaga is common preparation of rutabaga brought from Scandinavia. European dumplings such as kluski, spätzle, halušky, potato dumplings and pierogis remain somewhat popular. Wild rice is commonly served as a pilaf.

- Minnesota-style cheese curds – served battered and deep fried.
- Gravlax
- Minnesota sushi – an appetizer that contains a pickle, covered in cream cheese and wrapped in ham, and cut into slices like sushi.
- Basil wings – dry-rubbed chicken wings made with tempura-fried basil and numerous spices. Basil wings are a fusion dish originating in the Twin Cities.
- Salad varieties: Jello salad, potato salad, pasta salad, macaroni salad and wild rice salad
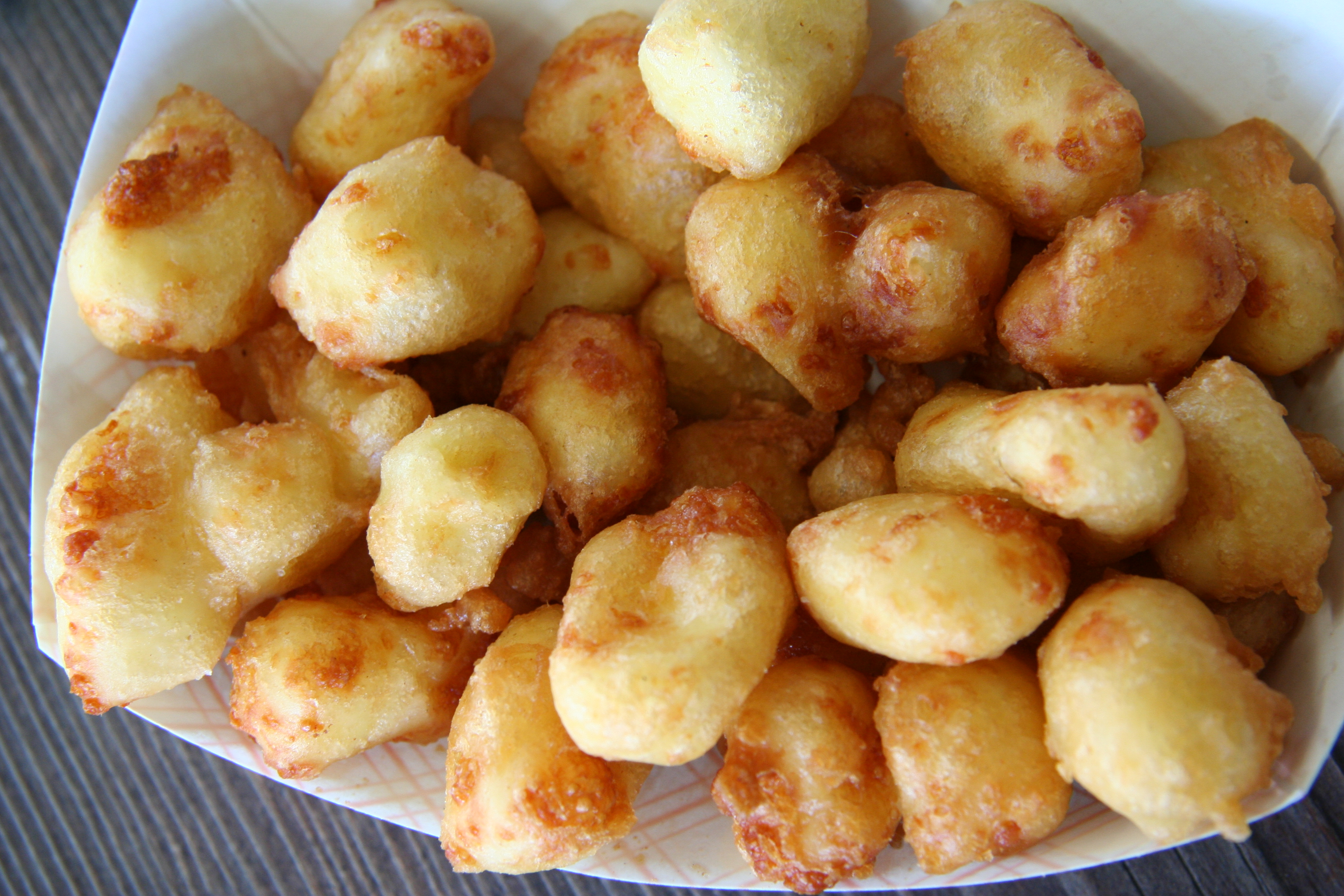
Fried cheese curds

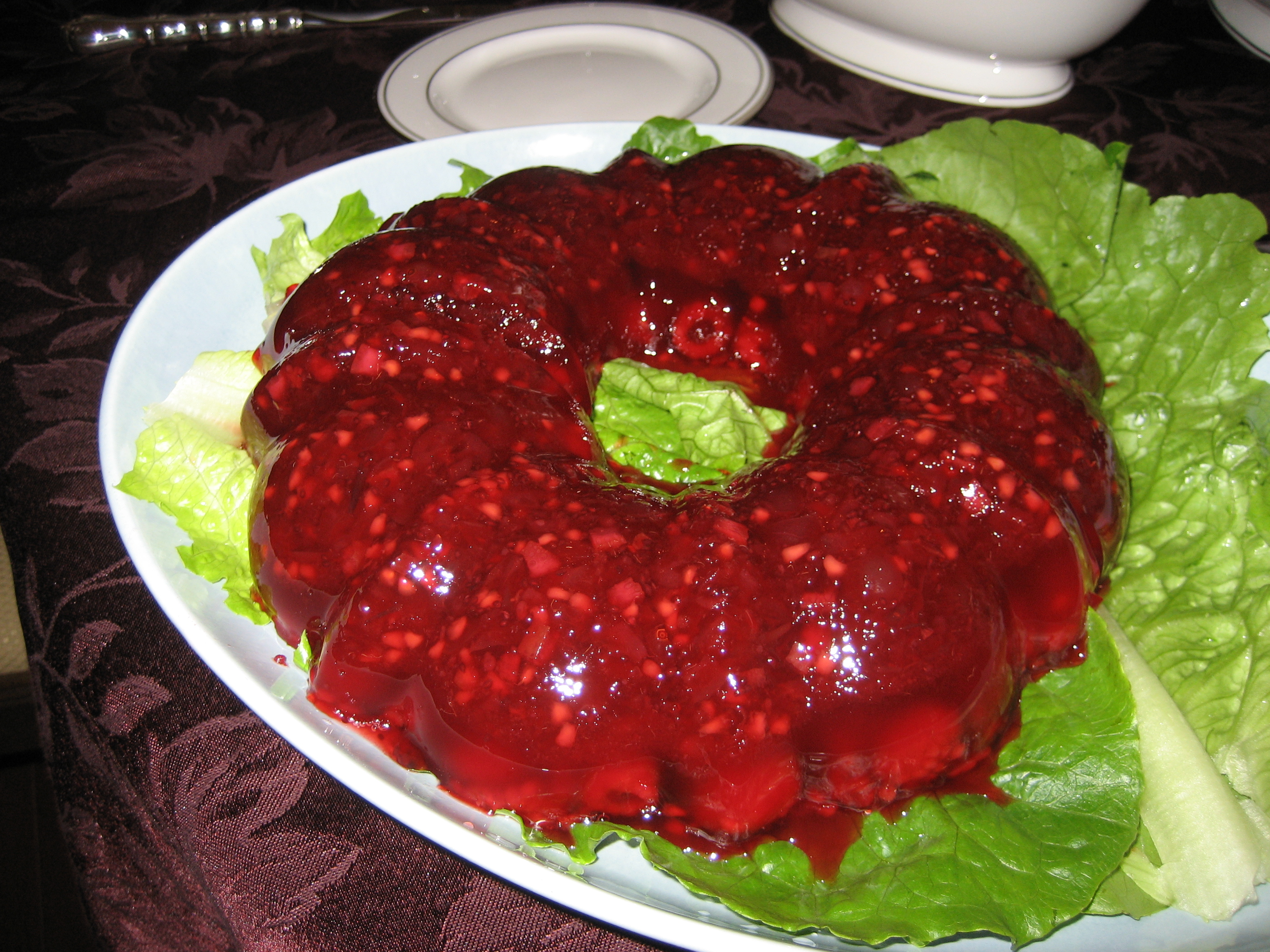
Cranberry Jello salad in a ring mold

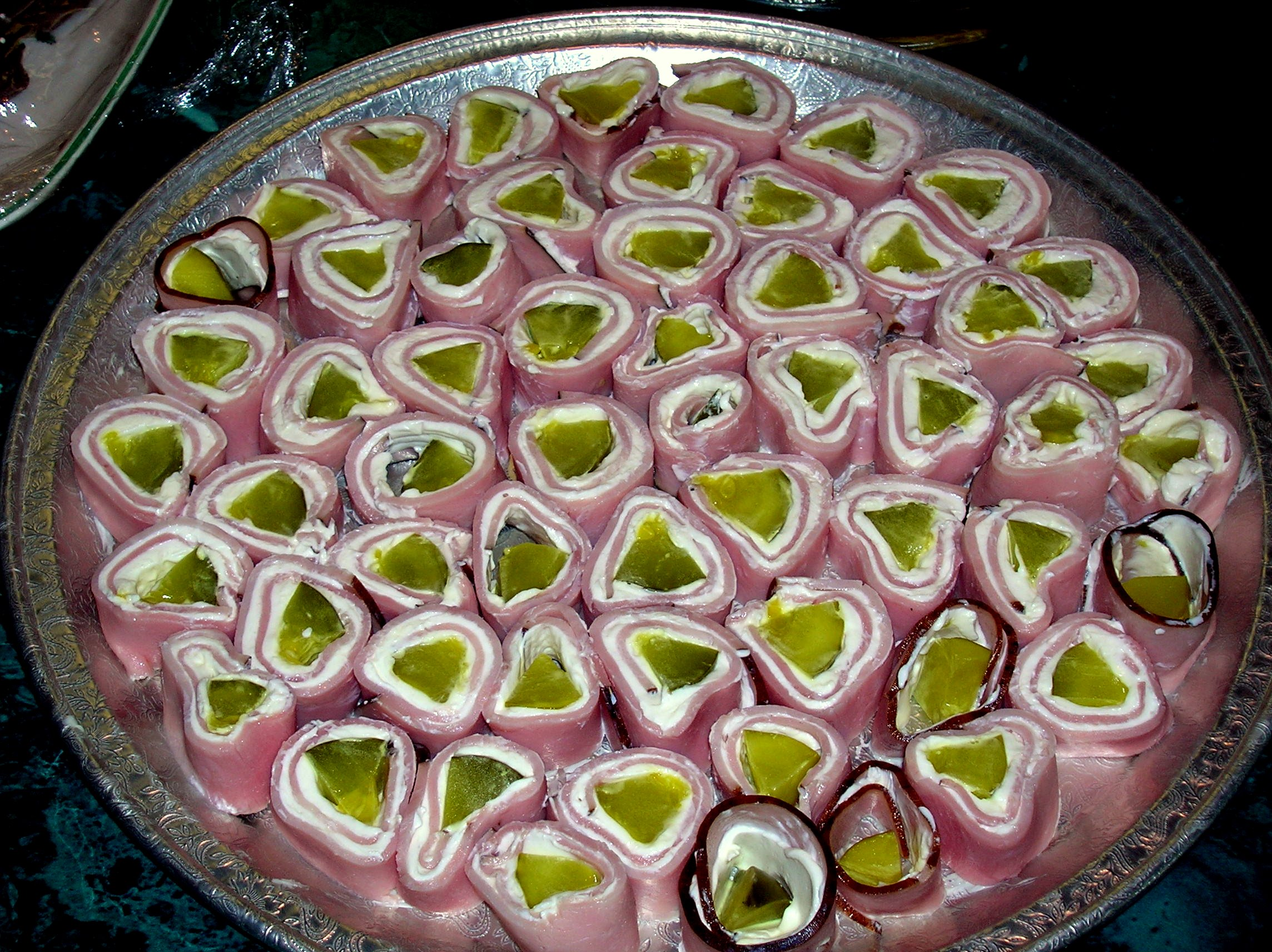
A tray of Minnesota sushi

=== Entrees ===
- Soup varieties: knoephla stew, booyah stew, wild rice soup, Lapskaus, and walleye chowder
- Pizza varieties: Minnesota-style pizza, Pizza rolls, and pickle pizza
- Sandwich varieties: the porketta sandwich, hot beef commercial, hot turkey commercial, fried walleye sandwich, hot dago, South American, Scandinavian open-faced sandwiches (smørrebrød), and the Jucy Lucy
- Lutefisk – dried whitefish, traditionally served with boiled potatoes, mashed green peas, melted butter and small pieces of fried bacon. Madison, Minnesota has dubbed itself the "lutefisk capital of the world".
- Swedish meatballs – traditionally served with gravy, boiled or mashed potatoes, lingonberry jam, and sometimes pickled cucumber. This dish was brought to Minnesota by Swedish immigrants.
- Walleye fingers – pieces of cut-up walleye that are deep-fried; popular in Minnesota because they are the state fish. It can also be served as a sandwich in Minnesota's pubs. Deep-fried walleye on a stick is a Minnesota State Fair food.
- Hotdish – a casserole dish that typically contains a starch, a meat, and a canned or frozen vegetable mixed with canned soup that must be served hot or warm. The most popular varieties in Minnesota are tater tot, tuna, chicken, hamburger, and wild rice hotdish.
  - Tater tot hotdish – made with ground beef, topped with tater tots, and flavored with thick condensed cream of mushroom soup sauce; some versions in Minnesota use the official state grain—wild rice—or even macaroni, in place of the potatoes. Tater tot hotdish is considered the "national dish" of Minnesota.
  - Sarma hotdish – a fusion hotdish made with layers of filling, sauerkraut, and cabbage leaves. The filling is usually a mix of tomato soup, ground beef, and rice. This dish is based on sarma and is eaten in Northern Minnesota.
- Minnesota goulash
- Egg bake – a baked dish similar to a strata. The dish consists of eggs, and other breakfast ingredients, but also can include bread. It can also be called a breakfast hotdish.
- Manoomin porridge – a porridge dish containing wild rice.
- Rømmegrøt – a thick and rich porridge made with sour cream, whole milk, wheat flour, butter, and salt; brought to Minnesota by Norwegian immigrants.
- Pasty – Pasties are made by placing an uncooked filling, typically meat and vegetables, in the middle of a flat shortcrust pastry circle. A popular in the iron range of Minnesota, especially as a lunch for iron miners.
- Minnesota-style chow mein – made with celery, bean sprouts, ground pork, and topped with processed chicken.
- Walleye cakes – fish cakes made with walleye meat.
- Funeral bread – cinnamon bread topped with Cheez Whiz and green olives. Particularly popular in Roseau.
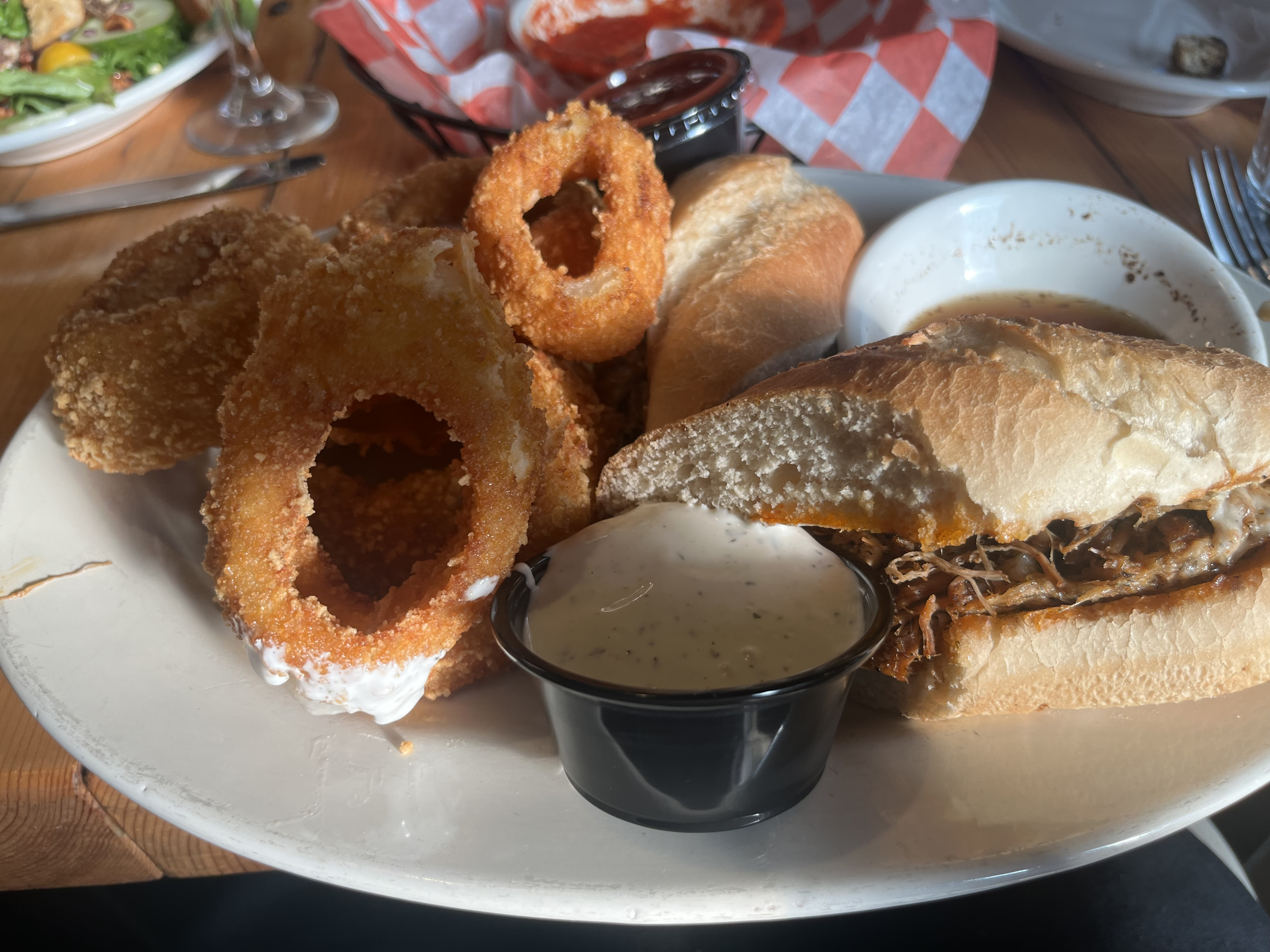
  Porketta sandwich served with onion rings and ranch
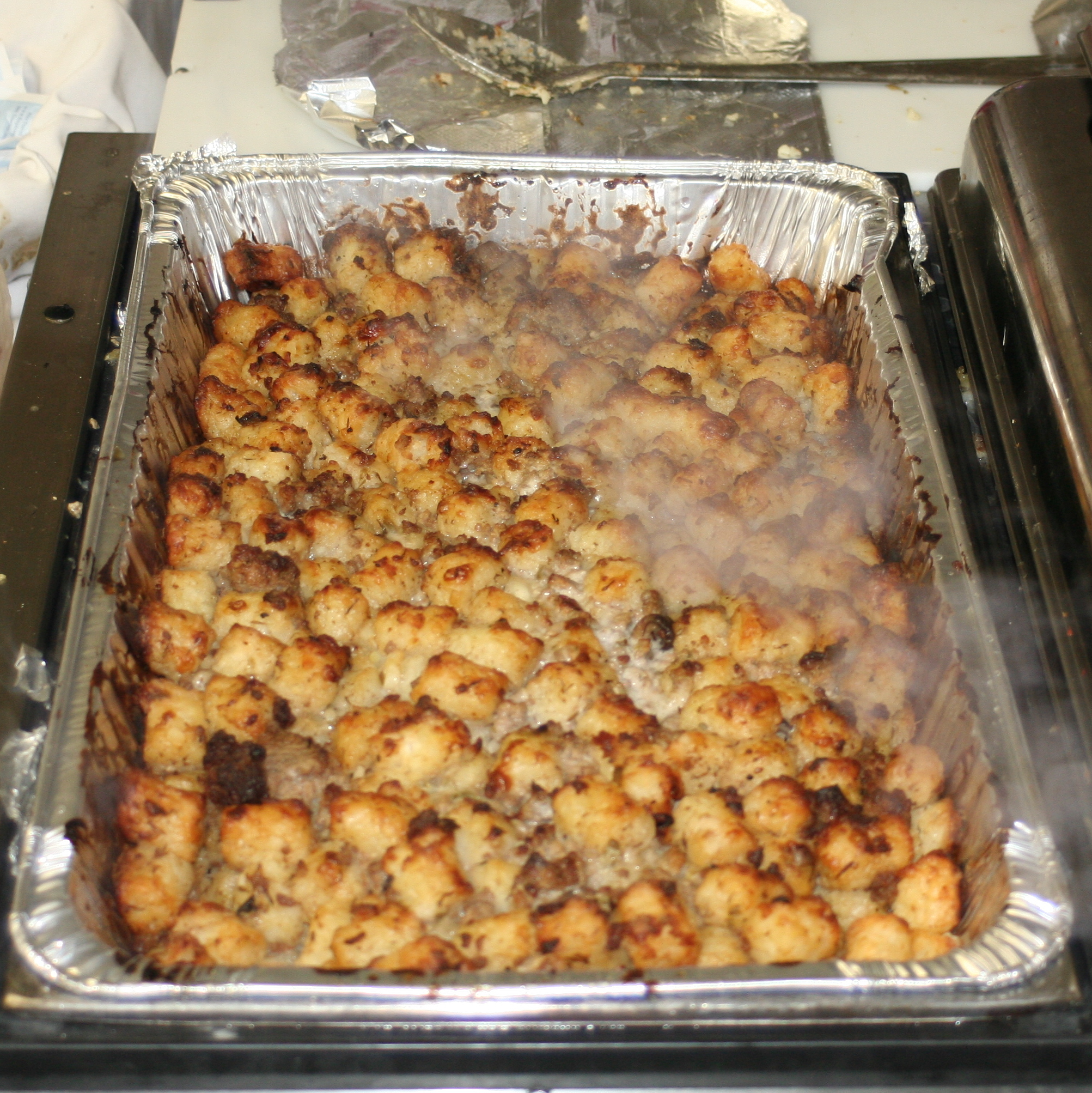
  Tater tot hotdish at the 2008 Winter Carnival
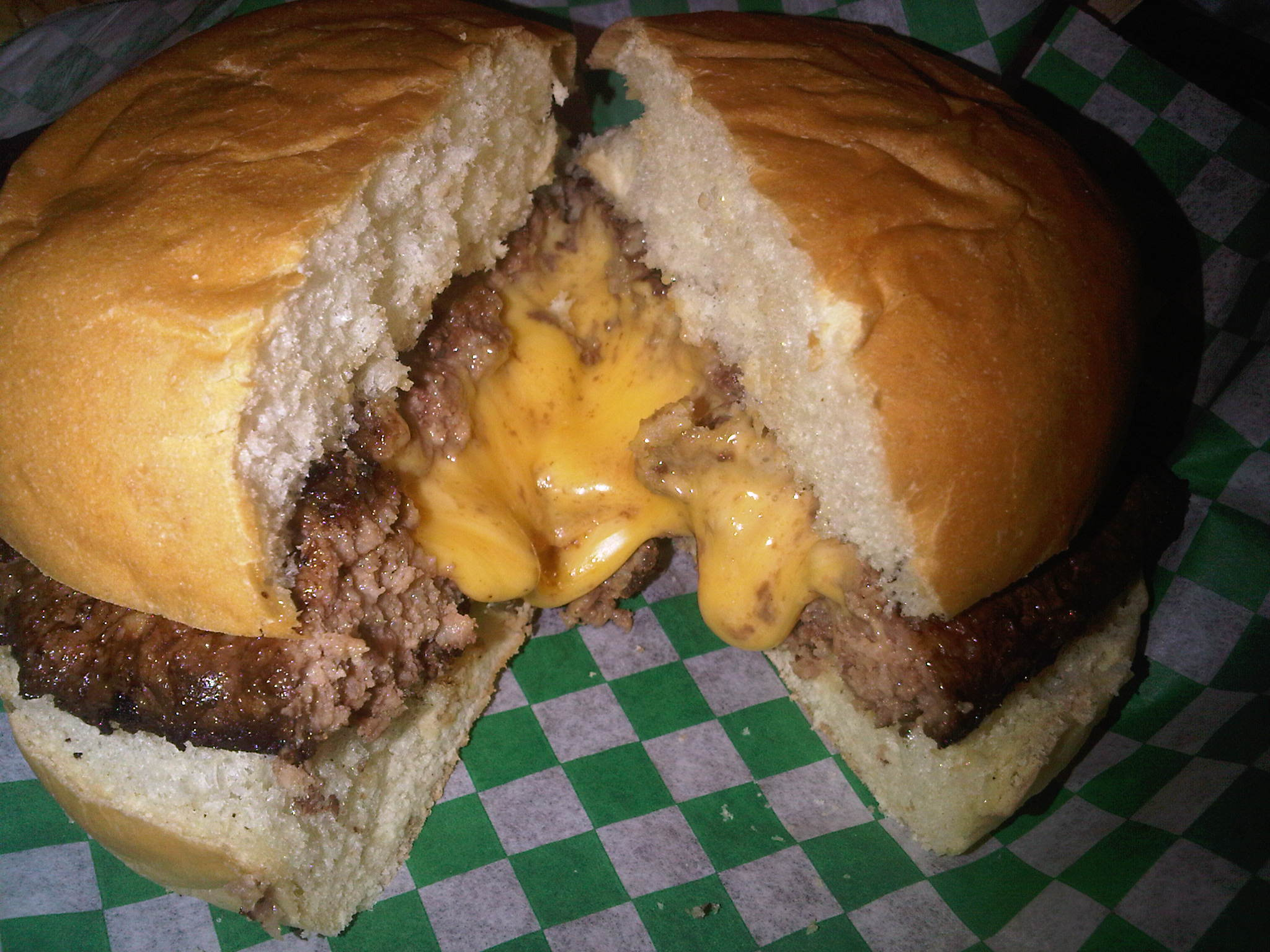
  Jucy lucy burger
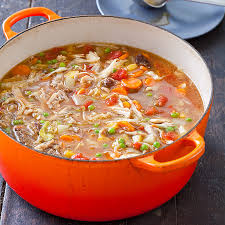
  A pot of booyah stew
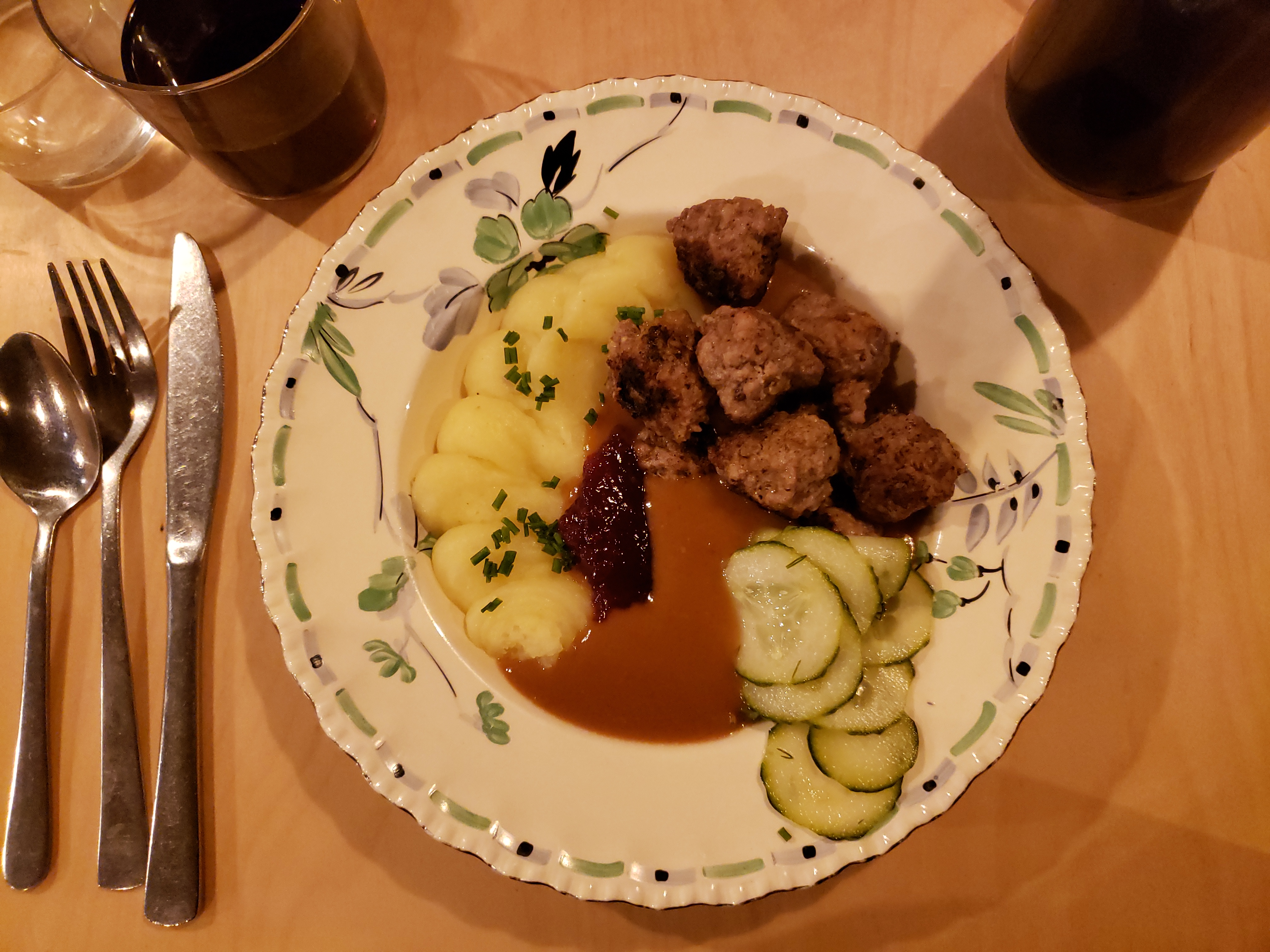
  Swedish meatballs with pickles, lingonberry jam, mashed potatoes, and gravy
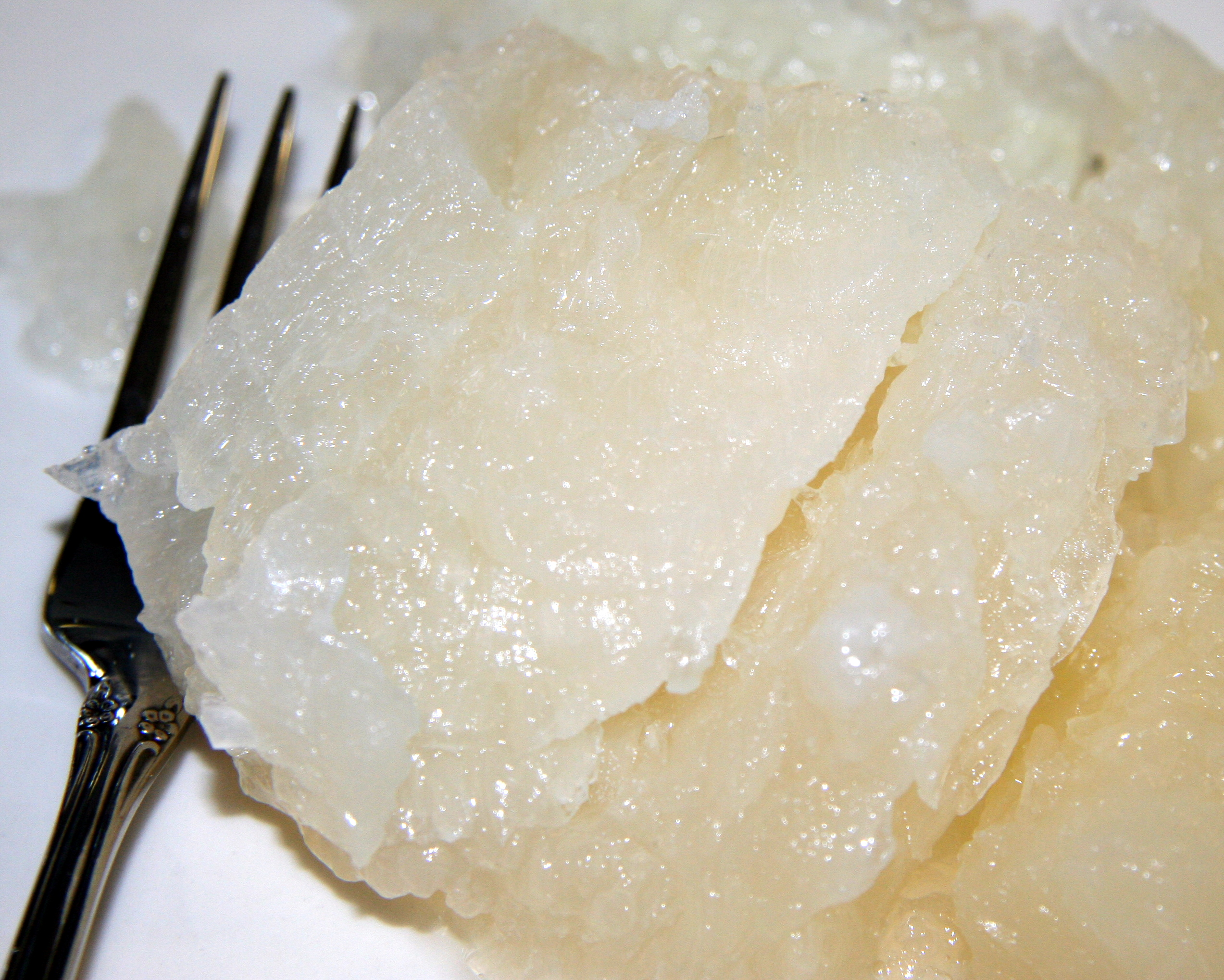
  Lutefisk

=== Desserts ===
- Dessert salads – cookie salad, watergate salad, Snickers salad, strawberry delight, and glorified rice
- Krumkake
- Dessert bars
- Scotcharoos – a variety of dessert bar popular in Minnesota
- Bundt cakes – a donut-shaped cake, invented in Minneapolis
- Kransekake
- German baked apples
- Pie à la Mode – pie served with ice cream, claimed to have been invented in Duluth
- Sweetened rice pudding

==== Pastries ====
- Blueberry muffin – state muffin of Minnesota
- Kolaches – made with cream cheese, jam, Nutella, or poppyseed filling in Minnesota
- Potica – a rolled pastry made of leavened paper-thin dough filled with any of a great variety of fillings, but most often with walnut filling
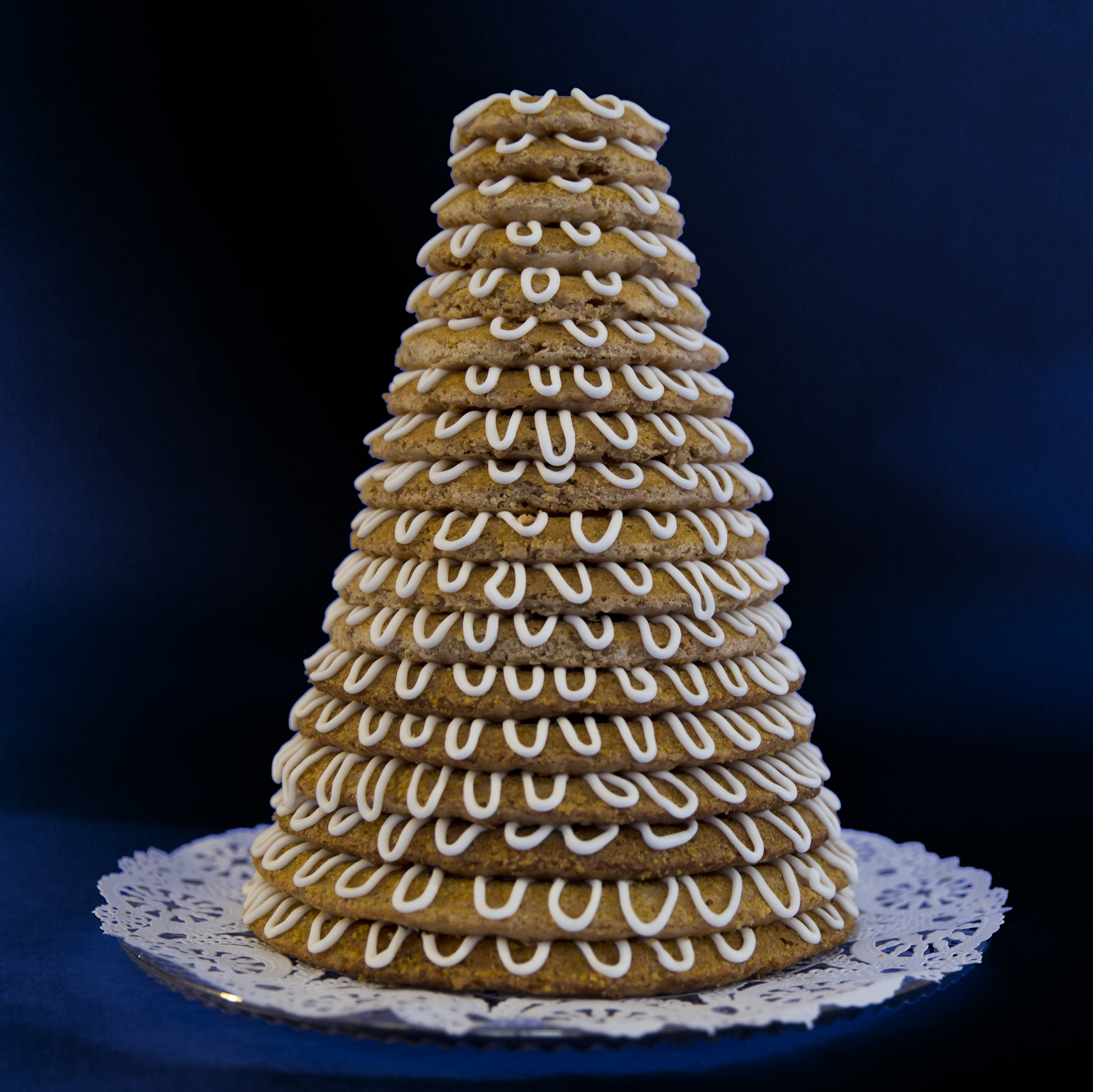
An 18-layer kransekake

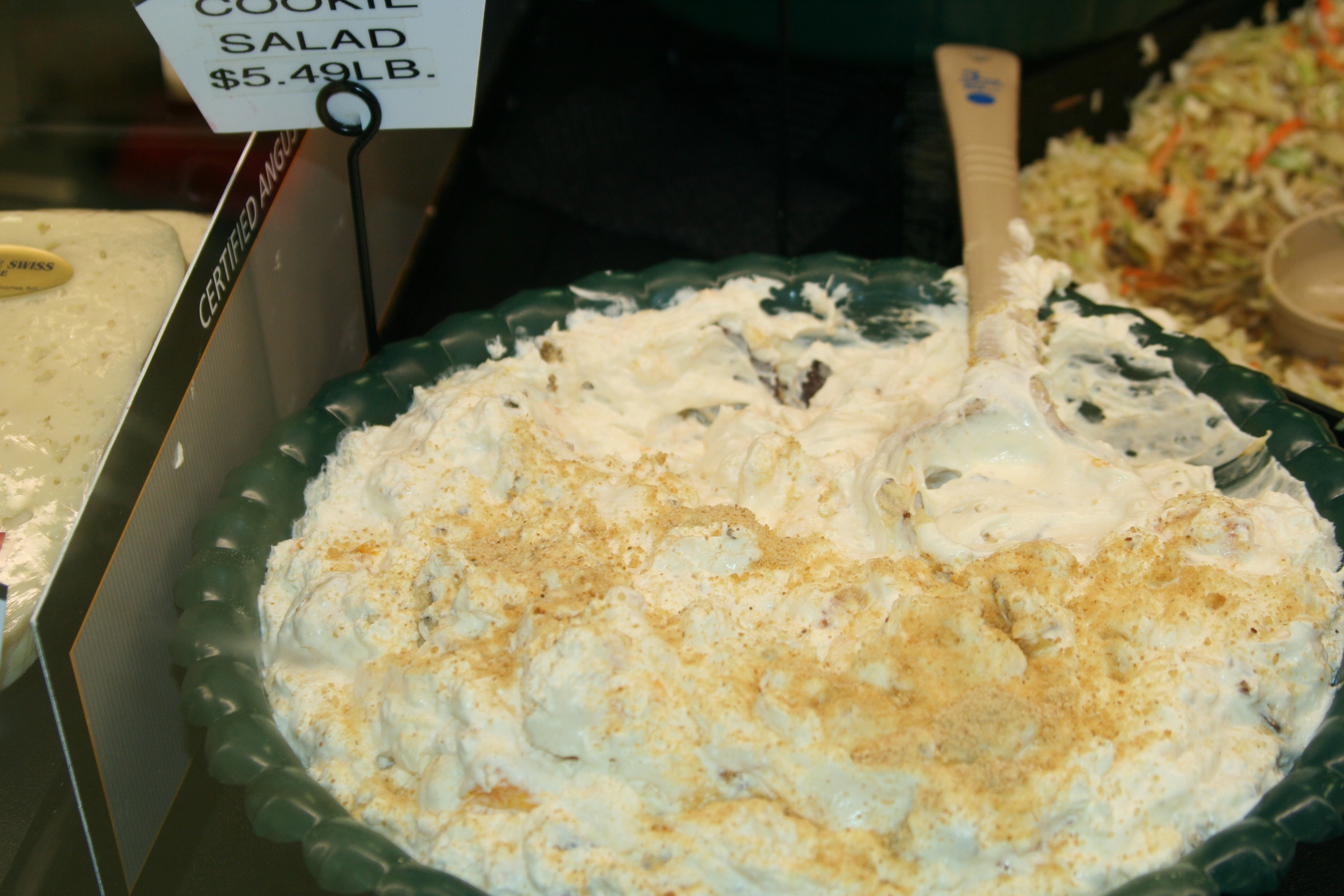
A cookie salad in a Minnesota supermarket

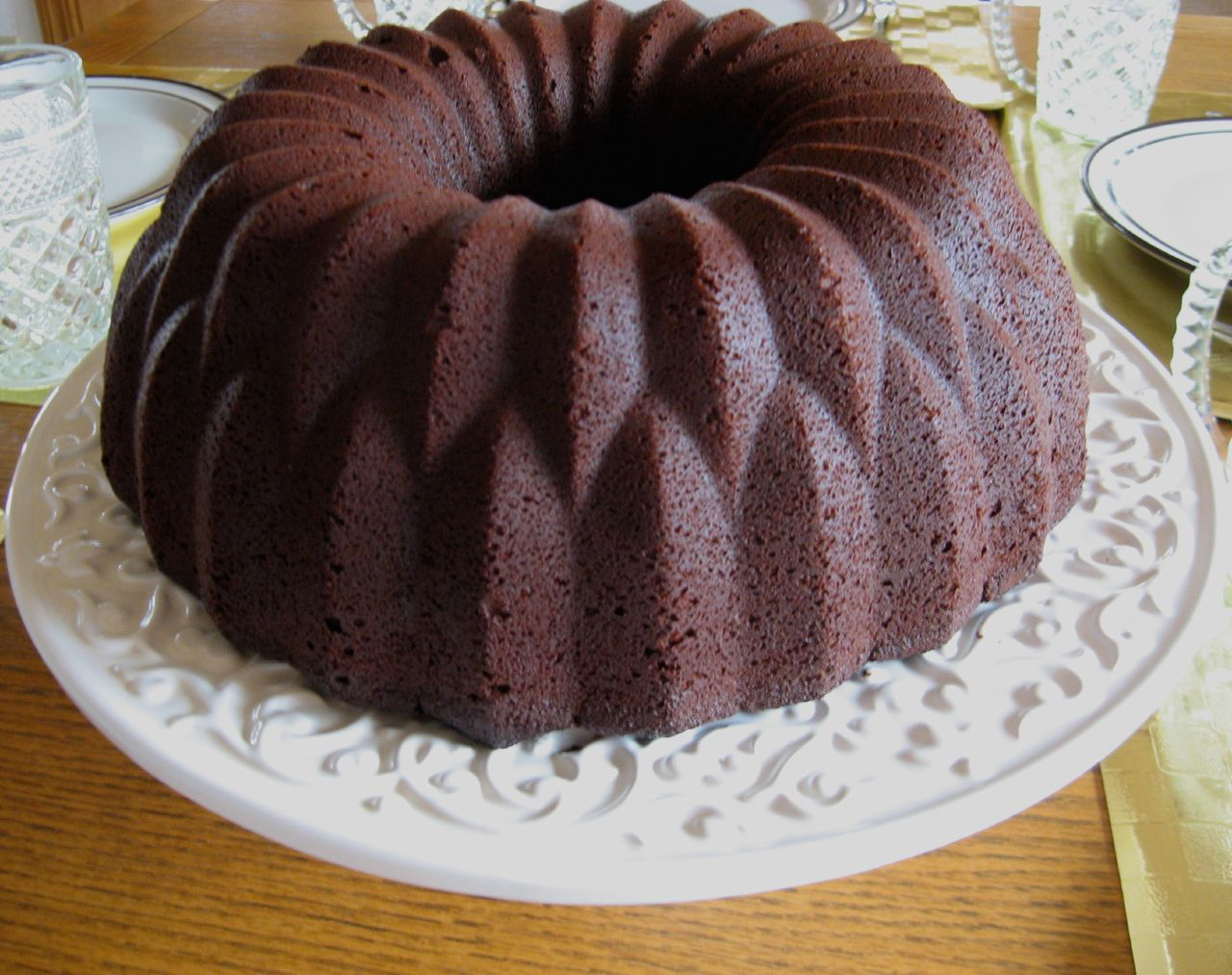
Chocolate Bundt cake

=== Lefse ===
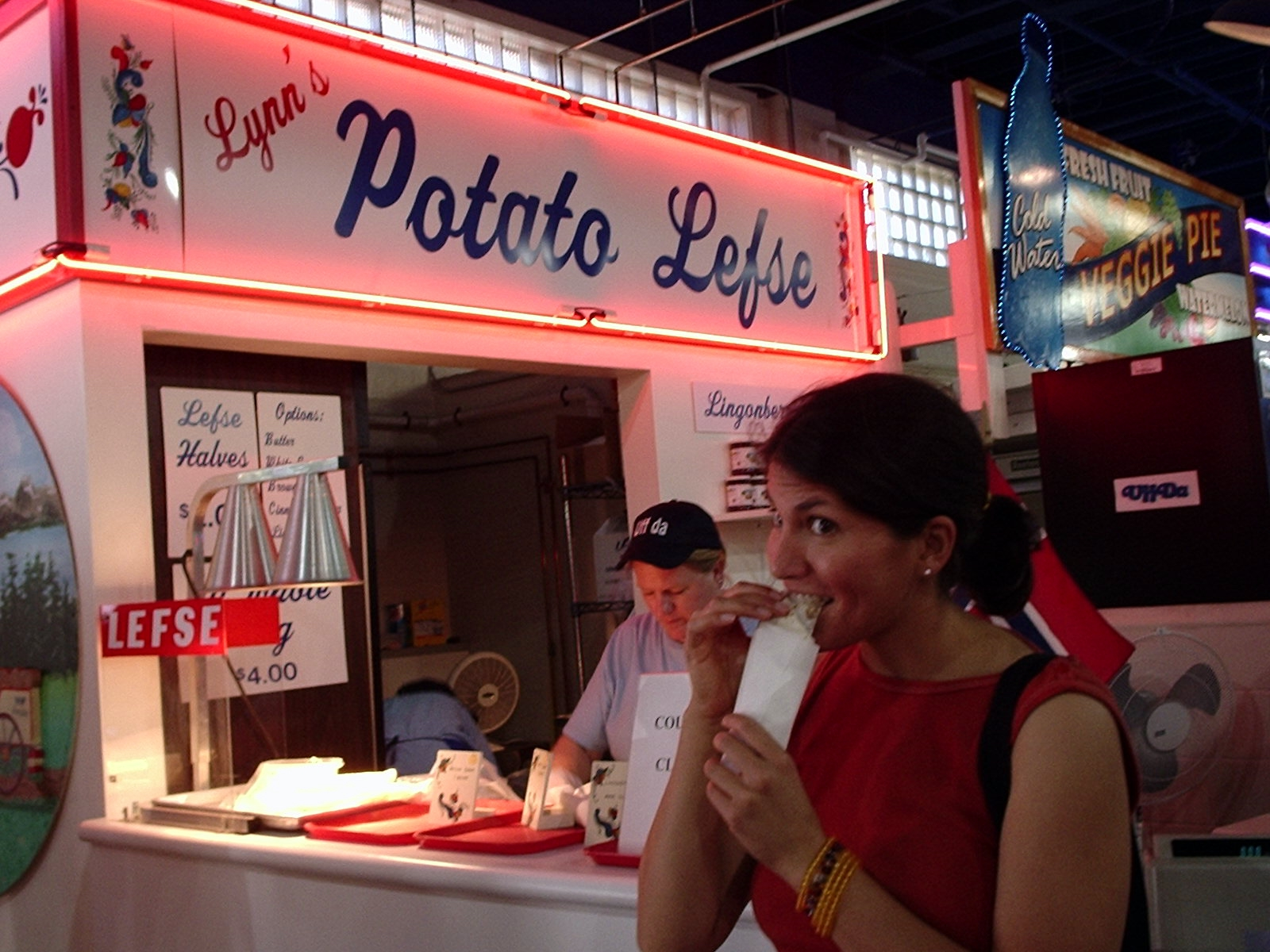
Lefse at the Minnesota State Fair

Lefse is a Norwegian flatbread made with riced potatoes, can include all purpose (wheat) flour, and includes butter, and milk, cream, or lard. It is cooked on a large, flat griddle. In Minnesota it is typically made with potatoes, due to early success with potato crops. It is comparable to a tortilla. Lefse is a traditional accompaniment to lutefisk, and the fish is often rolled up in the lefse. It is eaten plain or filled. Lefse is a significant cultural food in Minnesota and a source of pride for locals.

Within Minnesota, lefse is eaten in a number of ways: including with jelly, or lingonberries as a breakfast meal, or with ham and eggs. Lefse as a dessert is often consumed with butter and white sugar, brown sugar, or corn syrup, and optionally cinnamon, peanut butter can also be included. Savory options can include cold cuts, mustard, smoked fish, and hotdogs.

Lefse is common in several dishes in Minnesota. Lefse buss is a dish consisting of meatballs wrapped in a lefse, sometimes with gravy drizzled on top. This dish can be served with mashed potatoes or french fries. Lefse wraps are simply wraps using lefse instead of a tortilla. Lefse melts are a lefse filled with meat and melting cheese that is folded, and toasted until the cheese melts, which is similar to a melt sandwich.

== Beverages ==
=== Non-alcoholic ===
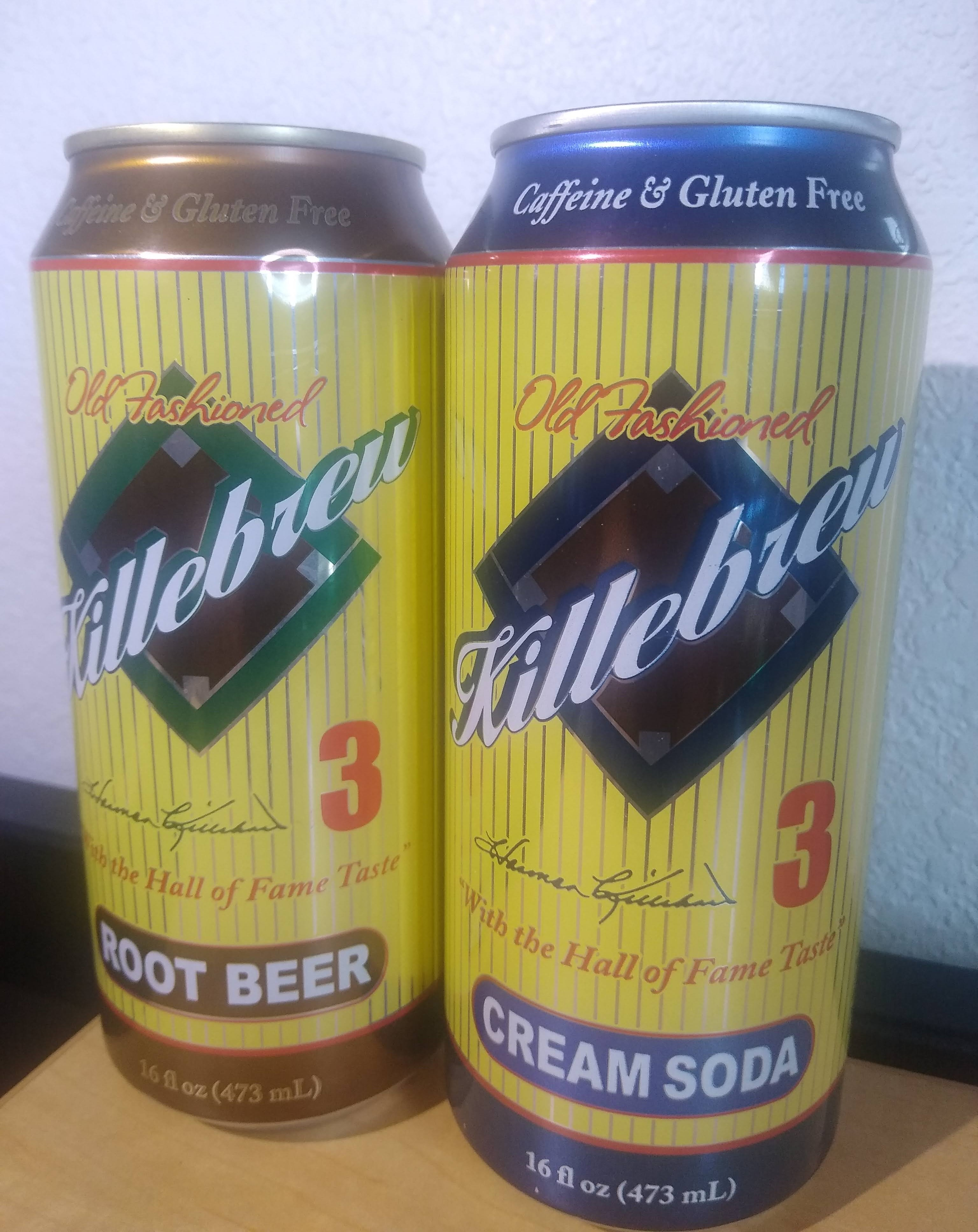
Two cans of Killebrew root beer

Craft root beer is popular in Minnesota and there are many brands in Minnesota such as Killebrew, 1919, Lift Bridge, and Northern Craft Root beer. Milk is very important for making cheeses. It is also the state beverage of Minnesota. Swedish egg coffee is a drink made with coffee grounds mixed with and egg in boiling water. It is popular consumed at meal gatherings at churches and at the state fair. Adding cubes of butter to coffee is also common.

=== Cocktails ===
The Bootlegger cocktail was invented in Minnesota and remains popular today. The cocktail is made with bootleg mix (a mix of water, sugar, and lime juice), vodka, club soda, and mint leaves and lime wedges for garnish. Akvavit was brought from Scandinavia by immigrants and is produced in numerous distilleries, it is used in some cocktail recipes. The Minnesota Slammer, a popular cocktail in Minnesota, is made with cherry brandy, bitters, peach and sour apple schnapps, and lemon-lime soda. A Minnesota Martini is a glass of light beer with olives. As with the rest of the Upper Midwest, a Bloody Mary is often served with a sidecar of beer.

=== Beer ===
Minnesota is also home to several breweries, including Hamm's, Summit Brewing Company, Surly Brewing Company, and August Schell Brewing Company, which also produces Grain Belt.

=== Wine ===
Minnesota also produces Minnesota wines. The Minnesota Grape Growers Association (MGGA) is a statewide organization that promotes grape growing and winemaking in the state and also in cold-hardy climates. Minnesota is home to the International Cold Climate Wine Competition (ICCWC) hosted annually in partnership between MGGA and University of Minnesota. This is the only wine competition solely dedicated to the promotion of quality wines made mainly from cold-hardy grape varieties.

Ice wine is also produced in Minnesota at several wineries.

== Meat specialties ==
=== Porketta ===
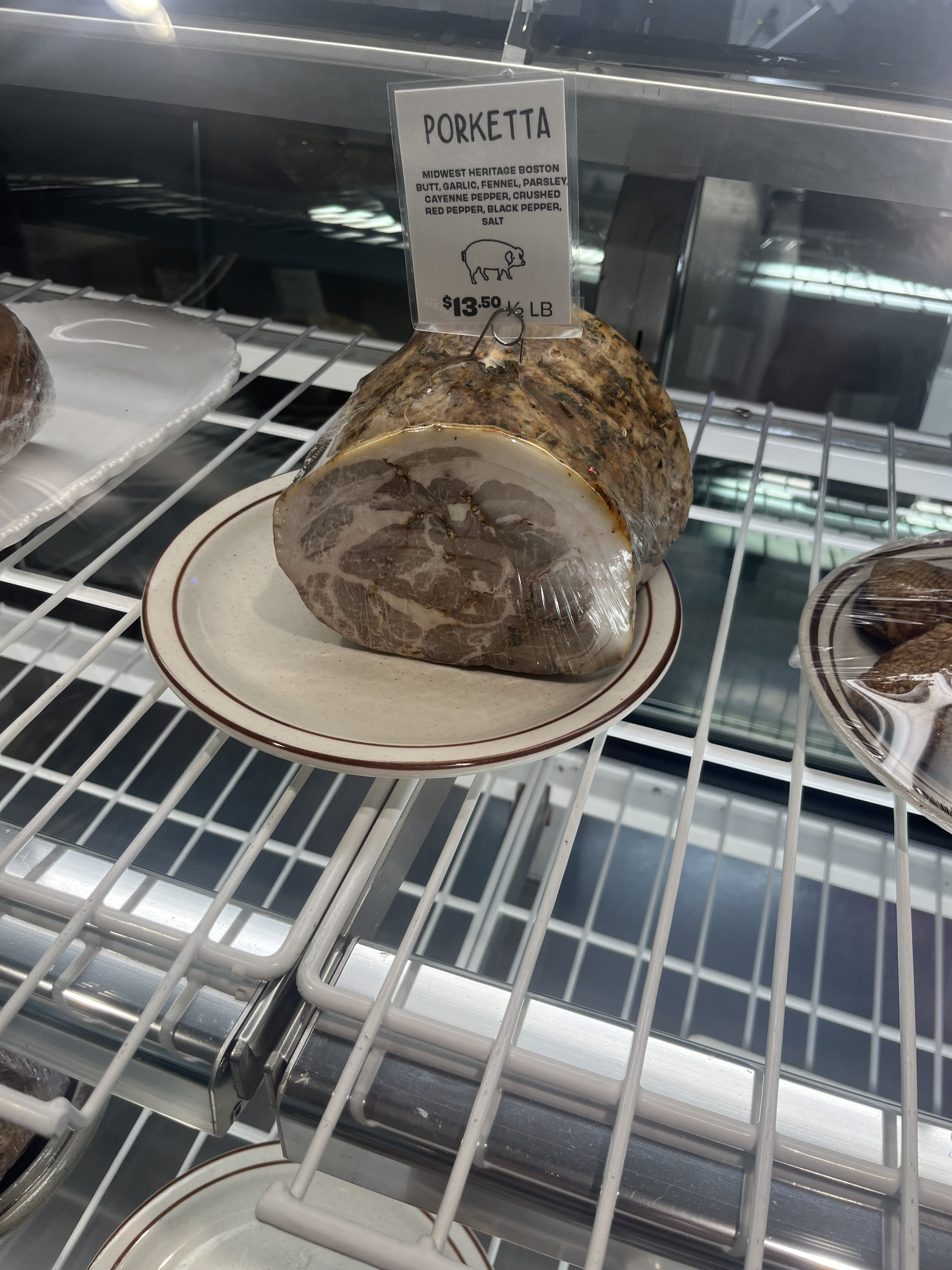
A pre-prepared porketta for sale in Duluth

Porketta is a unique version of porchetta, an Italian roast made with pork belly. Porketta was invented by Italian immigrants in the Iron Range of Minnesota as a cheaper alternative. This dish is made with pork shoulder or pork butt, and seasoned with garlic and fennel. It is produced in the Iron Range by suppliers such as Fraboni Sausage.

=== Smoked lake fish ===
On the north shore of Lake Superior, the tradition of smoking and curing lake fish is common. This tradition originated with Scandinavian immigrants around the 18th century and can be found in coastal towns throughout the Upper Midwest. Commonly smoked fish include rainbow smelt, lake trout, salmon, and lake herring.

=== Pickled herring ===
The tradition of pickled herring came from Scandinavia.

== Barbecue ==
Barbecue is a relatively new development in Minnesota, due to the lack of migration of African American migrants from the South during the Great Migration. As with the rest of the Upper Midwest and Northeast, barbecue in Minnesota has consisted of grilling bratwurst or hamburgers. This trend is now changing, because pitmasters are moving to Minnesota, particularly the Twin Cities and bringing barbecue traditions from Kansas City, Texas, and the Carolinas. This is a relatively new development as the first barbecue restaurants began appearing in the 1980s; Minnesota-style barbecue thus does not differ greatly from its Southern counterparts, leading some pitmasters to dispute its status as a unique barbecue style. One difference is the use of sugar maple instead of pecan or hickory at some establishments. The meats used are mostly standard, such as short ribs, chicken, pulled pork, and brisket; unusual meat selections include wild game sausage and fish such as salmon. Another idiosyncratic factor is the influence of Scandinavian cuisines on this style; horseradish is used, as opposed to chiles, as a seasoning to suit the Minnesotan palate, and jams are used in the barbecue sauces, resulting in creations such as lingonberry-infused barbecue sauce. Lefse may be served as a side dish. Often, Minnesotan barbecue emphasizes locally sourced livestock, meat, and produce.

Side dishes served with Minnesotan barbecue include traditional coleslaw, French fries, and baked macaroni and cheese, but other accompaniments idiosyncratic to the state include lefse, pickles, Ranch dressing, and broccoli salad.

Minnesota-style barbecue was started by OMC Smokehouse in Duluth, Erik the Red and Minnesota BBQ co. in the Twin Cities, and Neighbor's BBQ in Biwabik.

Minnesota also has Hmong-style barbecue particularly in the Hmongtown Marketplace; this style uses Hmong sausage, pork, and chicken, along with sticky rice and spicy dipping sauces.

== Ingredients ==
In northern Minnesota, along the North Shore of Lake Superior, commercial fishing has been practiced for generations. Settlers were used to the cold, rugged work as many of these immigrants came directly from the coastal fishing villages of Norway. Ciscoes (also known as lake herring), lake trout, lake whitefish, and rainbow smelt are still commercially fished today. Smoked or sugar-cured trout is prepared from local fish in areas along the North Shore like Duluth. Barbecue in Duluth typically consists of smoked lake fish, such as salmon. Grains such as corn, wild rice, and wheat are used. Canned fruits and vegetables are commonly used in several dishes as a result of the cold climate demanding the use of canning as a preservation method. Minnesotan cuisine is notable for the common use of wild and foraged foods, including wild rice, blueberry, raspberry, blackberry, chokecherry, morels, hazelnuts, and pecan truffles.

Minnesotan cuisine is notable for its use of kohlrabi and rutabaga. Minnesotan food is also rarely seasoned with hot peppers, instead spices, mustard, and horseradish are used.

=== Pickling ===
Pickling is an important tradition in Minnesota, especially since it is an excellent way to preserve produce in winter. Pickles can be found as snacks around the state and are served on-a-stick at the state fair. Several dishes in Minnesota cuisine also used pickles, such as Minnesota sushi and fried pickles. Fruits and vegetables are often pickled such as cucumbers and beets, along with fish such as pickled lake herring and Northern pike.

The Pickle-off is an annual pickling competition hosted in Minneapolis.

=== Sauces ===
While not invented in Minnesota, ranch is a very popular condiment. Lingonberry jam is also quite popular as a dipping sauce for lefse and lutefisk. Lingonberry-infused barbecue sauce is used in some Nordic barbecue restaurants. Cream sauce, a white sauce similar to bechamel but made with cream and seasoned with black pepper, allspice, and nutmeg, is served with lutefisk. White gravy and brown gravy are served with meatballs.

=== Produce ===
The Minnesota Agricultural Experiment Station's Horticultural Research Center at the University of Minnesota has developed three new apple varieties, the Haralson, Honeycrisp, and the Sweetango. These fare well in the harsh Minnesota climate and are popular fruit. Morel mushrooms are the state mushroom, and very popular among Minnesotan chefs. Wild rice is a popular appetizer in Minnesota. It can be eaten in several "ways" such as in a soup or hotdish. Lingonberries are used to accompany lefse and lutefisk. The berry can also be eaten plain as a snack. Lingonberries are also used to make jam. The Minnesota midget melon is a small muskmelon cultivar invented by the University of Minnesota.

=== Cheese ===
Minnesota is known for its dairy industry. Cheeses in Minnesota are made with cow, sheep, or goat milk. Caves of Faribault and Shepherd's Way Farms are among the Minnesota businesses that produce artisan cheese. Caves of Faribault has produced cave-aged cheeses in Faribault since 2001. Shepherd's Way, which began producing cheese in 1998. Minnesota produces numerous cheeses such as cheddar, brie, Swiss, and gouda.

- Morcella – a sheep cheese which is sprinkled with morel mushrooms
- Big Woods Blue – a blue cheese made with sheep milk
- Amablu – a blue cheese produced in the Caves of Faribault
- Fresh cheese curds

=== Meats ===
Meats, specifically from livestock and poultry, are similar to what is found throughout the United States. Typical meats include turkey, chicken, beef (particularly ground beef), bison, and pork. Minnesota is home to a large pork and turkey industry, ranked second nationally for pork, and first for turkey. Minnesota also has a bison-ranching industry in Western and Central Minnesota. Spam is salty processed canned pork and ham. It is made and was invented in Austin, Minnesota. It can be eaten in many ways, but also plain as a snack.

==== Fish ====
Minnesota is home to over eleven thousand lakes, which provides its citizens with numerous pan fish to angle, including lake herring, whitefish, walleye, salmon, trout, perch, and bluegill. These are often eaten in a "shore lunch". Walleye is considered a delicacy in Minnesota and is the most prized by far. Fish are often eaten fried and breaded in Minnesota. While not caught in Minnesota, cod is a common fish used in Friday fish fries.

== Sausages ==
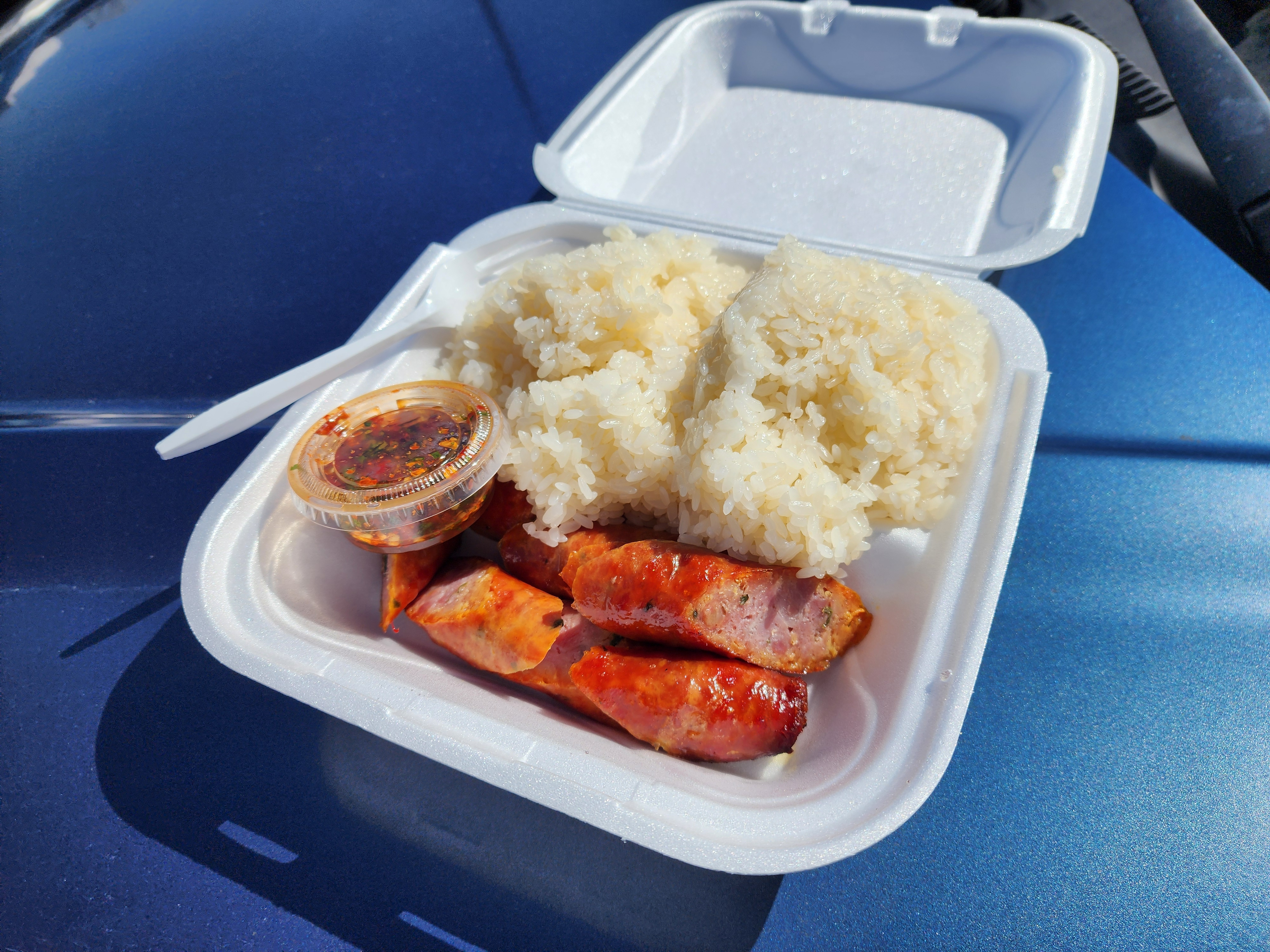
Hmong sausage with rice in the Hmongtown Marketplace of St. Paul

Sausage making is an important aspect of Minnesotan immigrant culture, with many European varieties becoming popular, along with Hmong sausage.

- Polish sausage – is very popular served cold as cold cuts on a platter, usually for an appetizer. It is also a common snack served with beer or plain vodka.
  - Krakowska – a type of Polish sausage
- New Ulm Summer sausage – a summer sausage containing mustard seeds and spices, and produced in New Ulm. They are typically smoked over hardwood.
- Bratwursts – are eaten in hotdog buns or as corndogs
- Hmong sausage – is a long thick pork sausage from Hmong culture seasoned with herbs. These are mainly found in the Twin Cities.
- Swedish potato sausage (Potatiskorv)
- Wild rice sausage – a sausage stuffed with wild rice

== Regional cuisine ==
Due to Minnesota's ethnic diversity in its various regions and differing landscape, Minnesota has attained numerous regional cuisines. Every region has slight differences in its respective cuisine.

=== Iron Range cuisine ===
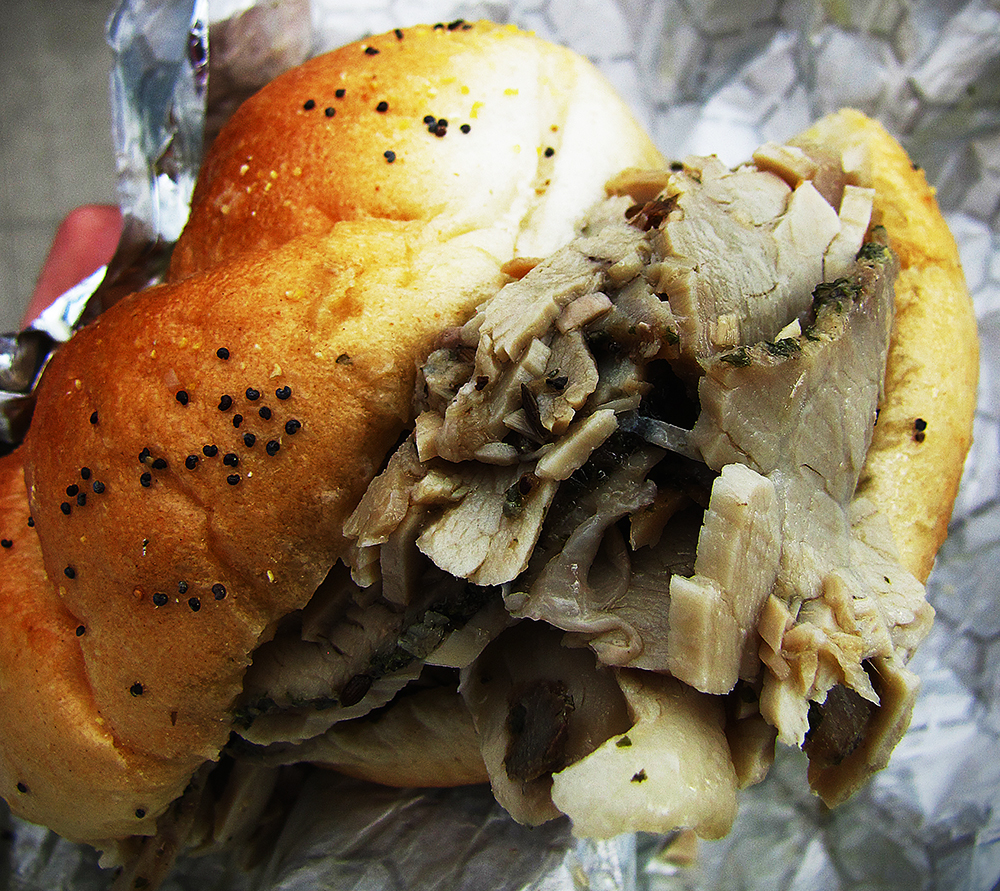
A Porketta sandwich, one of the most well known Iron Range dishes.

Iron Range cuisine encompasses the cooking traditions and dishes of the Arrowhead Region and Iron Range of Minnesota. Iron Range cuisine is based on Italian, Cornish, Scandinavian, and Slovenian cuisine. The three most notable dishes from the Iron Range include; pasties from Cornwall, potica from Slovenia, and the local porketta. These are collectively known as the Three Ps of Iron Range Cuisine. Many of the dishes were brought by immigrants. Other dishes were invented by the iron mine workers because they needed nourishing foods that they could bring on the go.

==== Dishes of the Iron Range ====
- Iron Range pot roast – Pot roast made with porketta or pork, potatoes, and seasonings
- Porketta – Porchetta variation made with pork shoulder or pork butt, and seasoned with garlic and fennel, produced in the Iron Range
- Porketta sandwich – Sandwich consisting of slow-roasted, seasoned pork, served on a sandwich with greens (rapini or spinach) and provolone cheese. Porketta remains a popular local dish in towns such as Hibbing with distributors such as Fraboni Sausage.
- South American sandwich – Bar snack invented in the Iron Range, made with several kinds of minced meat, onions, tomatoes, peppers, celery and other leftovers between two slices of bread
- Walleye chowder – Creamy soup made with walleye
- Baklava – Layered filo pastry dessert
- Cabbage rolls – Cooked cabbage leaves stuffed with a variety of fillings; sarma, which uses a meat stuffing, is one such variant.
- Lasagna – Flat pasta and stacked pasta dishes
- Pasties – Savory pastries made by placing an uncooked filling, typically meat and vegetables, in the middle of a flat shortcrust pastry circle, bringing the edges together in the middle, and crimping over the top to form a seal before baking. They are popular in the Iron Range of Minnesota, especially as a lunch for iron miners.
- Potica – Rolled pastries made of leavened paper-thin dough and a filling, but most often with walnut filling
- Sauerbraten – German roast meat entree

=== Twin Cities cuisine ===
Twin Cities cuisine differs greatly from the rest of Minnesota due to its ethnically diverse population. Fusion cuisine is quite prevalent in the Twin Cities. Major influences include German, Somali, Hmong, American indigenous, Mexican, Indian, Vietnamese, Korean, Ethiopian, Burmese, Laotian, and Liberian cuisine.

Twin Cities cuisine includes more high-end elements than its rural counterparts, such as the hautedish, a gourmet version of the hotdish and cheese curds made with brie. Of Minnesota's 16 winners of a James Beard Award for restaurant or chef, 14 are in the Twin Cities. Most recently, Christina Nguyen of Vietnamese restaurant Hai Hai won Best Chef Midwest in 2025 and Owamni, a new indigenous restaurant, won Best New Restaurant in 2022.

==== Dishes of the Twin Cities ====
- Basil wings – Spicy Lao-inspired chicken wings
- Bundt cake – Donut-shaped cake
- Hot dago – Italian-American sausage sandwich topped with marinara sauce
- Jucy Lucy – Hamburger with cheese inside the patty
- Ke'Ke – Stew made with strips of chapati, invented in Minneapolis by Somali immigrants.
- Minnesota-style pizza – Style of pizza with square cuts (known as Minneapolis-style pizza in the Twin Cities)
- Wild rice pancake – A pancake variation that incorporates wild rice
- Hmong sausage – Long thick pork sausage seasoned with herbs, of Hmong origin
- Sambusa – Fried savory dumplings similar to samosas
- Bánh mi – A baguette filled with vegetables and meats originating from Vietnam
- Pho – a soup dish consisting of broth, rice noodles, herbs, and meat usually beef, and sometimes chicken. It is very popular in Minnesota and can be found in eateries around the Twin Cities.

=== Western Minnesota ===
While Minnesota is not known for bison, buffalo burgers and bison steaks are becoming increasingly common due to the bison ranching industry in Western and Central Minnesota. Bison meat can be found in supermarkets and on restaurant menus around the state. Western Minnesota is also known for commercial sandwiches, such as the hot beef commercial. Khoephla soup is also a popular dish from the region.

=== North Shore ===
On the North Shore, fish is consumed more commonly due to the proximity to Lake Superior, which has a commercial fishing industry. One common food is pickled lake herring. The tradition of smoking and curing fish can be found in Duluth and along the coast. Commonly consumed fish include trout, lake whitefish, salmon, smelt, and lake herring.

== Holiday cuisine ==
Minnesota has many food traditions for holidays, including Christmas, Lent, and Thanksgiving.

During Lent, Catholics forgo eating all meat on Fridays except for fish. This led to the tradition of the fish fry, in which churches and restaurants serve fried fish on Fridays.

Minnesota food traditions associated with Christmas notably include the consumption of lutefisk, which is often served with meatballs, potatoes, lefse, and other accompaniments. Some churches offer lutefisk dinners at Christmastime. Bakeries offer special items around Christmas such as rosettes, sandbakelse, lebkuchen, German Christmas bread, gingerbread, and potica. Rømmegrøt is also occasionally eaten during the holidays.

Thanksgiving in Minnesota includes American dishes such as turkey and mashed potatoes, but Minnesotan dishes are eaten as well, such as hotdish, lefse, wild rice, pickled herring, hot turkey commercials, and Jello salad.

While not a holiday, restaurants around Minnesota celebrate the state fair by offering specials on-a-stick, and foods commonly found at the state fair such as fried cheese curds.

== Food as an event ==
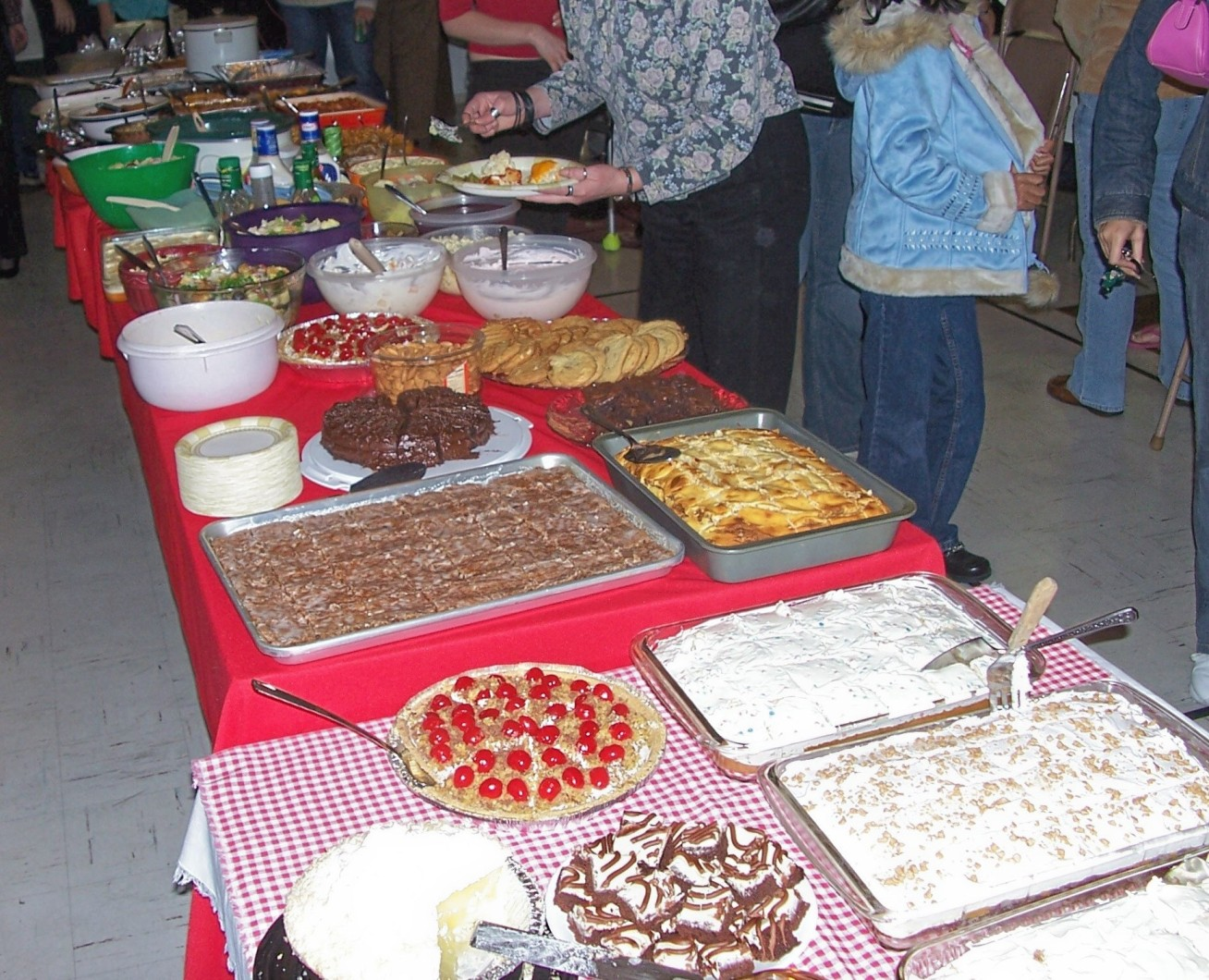
Minnesota potluck

=== Potlucks ===
Minnesota is known for its church potlucks, which is a social event where each participant brings food to share. hotdish is often served at potlucks. Hotdish is any of a variety of casseroles, which are popular throughout the United States, although the term "hotdish" is used mainly in Minnesota, Wisconsin, North Dakota, and South Dakota. Hotdishes are filling comfort foods that are convenient and easy to make. Tater tot hotdish is popular, as is wild rice hotdish; Minnesota is one of the leading producers of wild rice. Dessert bars are also common at Minnesota potlucks. Other dishes include glorified rice, German baked apples and cookie salad.

=== Fish fry ===
The Friday night fish fry, often battered and fried perch or walleye, is traditional throughout Minnesota. It usually also includes french fries, coleslaw, macaroni salad, lemon slices, tartar sauce, hot sauce, malt vinegar and dessert. Some Native American versions are cooked by coating fish with semolina and egg yolk. Fish is often served on Friday nights during Lent, the Christian season of repentance, as a restaurant special or through church fundraisers.

=== Booyah ===
A booyah is a large gathering in which booyah stew is served, typically outdoors. The annual booyah cook off is held in St. Paul.

=== Smorgasbord ===
Smorgasbord is a buffet-style meal of Swedish origin. It is served with various hot and cold dishes. In Minnesota it is served with kolaches, potica, halušky and pierogis.

=== Lutefisk Dinner ===
Lutefisk dinners are large gatherings, typically around Christmas, but also from October to February were lutefisk and other dishes are served. They are often held by churches. The lutefisk is often accompanied with lefse, mashed potatoes, mashed rutabaga, rice pudding, mashed peas, lingonberry jam, cream sauce, and Swedish meatballs.
