= Manoomin porridge =

Wild rice breakfast porridge

Wild rice porridge
- Alternative names: Manoomin porridge, Mahnomin porridge
- Course: Main course
- Place of origin: Minnesota
- Region or state: Minneapolis
- Serving temperature: Hot
- Main ingredients: wild rice, cream

Manoomin porridge, also known as wild rice porridge, is a breakfast dish in Minnesotan cuisine. It was inspired by Native American foodways, as seen with the usage of wild rice (manoomin). The dish is a porridge with wild rice, dairy (or dairy alternatives), dried fruits, nuts, and maple syrup. The dish was invented at Hell's Kitchen restaurant in Minneapolis, but can be found at restaurants around the state.
