= Amablu =

Minnesota blue cheese

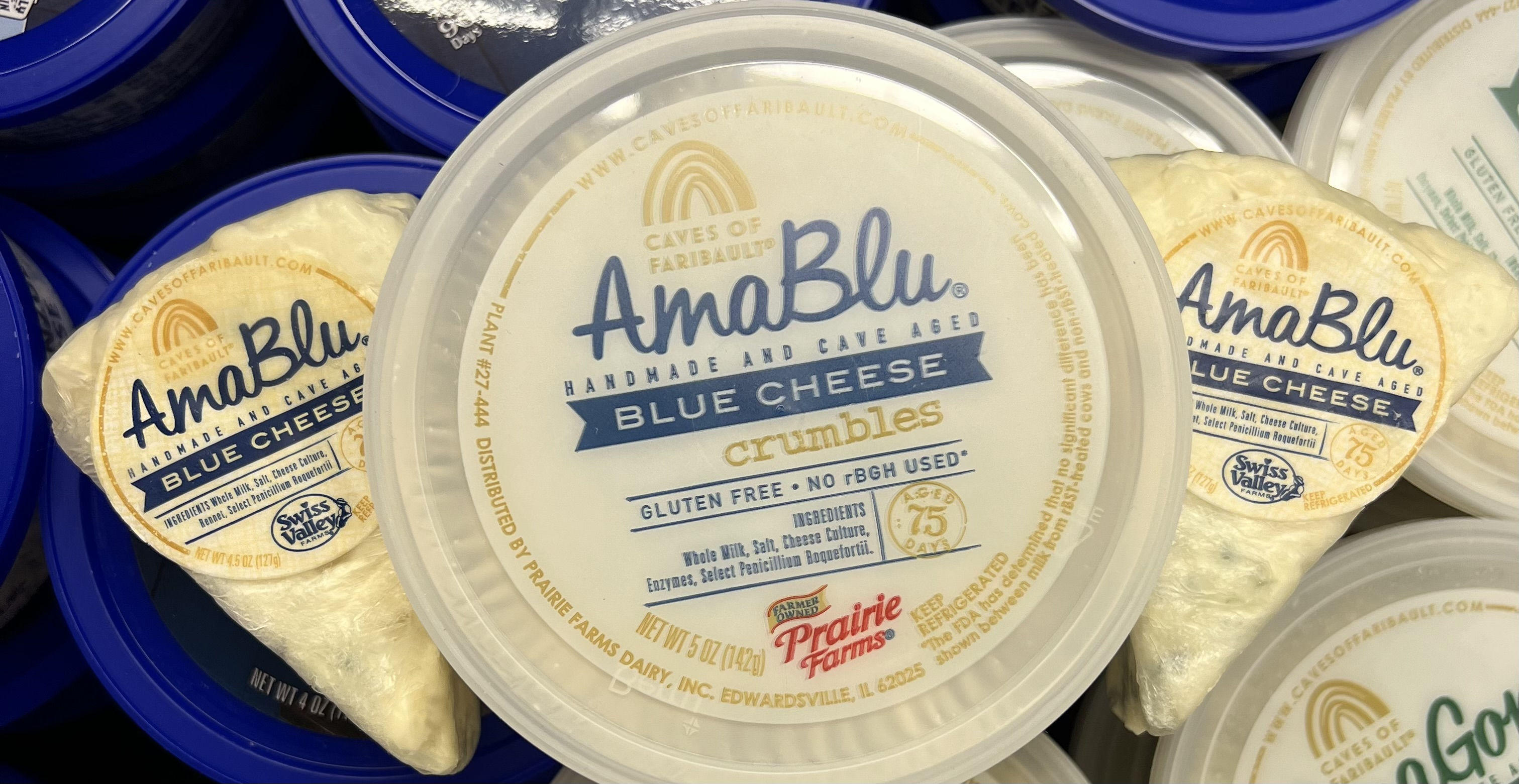
- Country of origin: United States
- Region: Minnesota
- Town: Faribault
- Source of milk: cow's milk
- Pasteurized: no
- Aging time: 75 days

AmaBlu, also known as Treasure Cave Blue Cheese, is an artisan blue cheese, made with unpasteurized cow milk. It is produced by the Caves of Fairbault, an artisanal cheese company in southern Minnesota. AmaBlu was the first blue cheese to be made in the United States, in 1936. It was originally called Treasure Cave Blue Cheese. The cheese is aged in a number of man-made and natural sandstone caves. The cheese is made from raw milk that is locally produced and tested to insure quality and safety. The unique geological characteristics of the sandstone contribute to the aroma and flavor of the cheese. The cheese is creamy, and must be aged for a minimum of 75 days.

== History ==
In 1936, the Treasure Cave Cheese Company, the first commercial manufacturer of blue cheese in the United States, opened in Faribault. The company took advantage of natural and man-made riverbank sandstone caves to mature its products. Their first product, then known as Treasure Cave Blue Cheese, was first made in 1936, making it the oldest blue cheese in The United States. During World War II, Minnesota became an important blue cheese center, so much so that St. Paul, Minnesota's capital, became known as the "Blue Cheese Capital of the World". Although it thrived, the company experienced a series of corporate sales and mergers beginning in 1965 that culminated in 1990 when ConAgra purchased the business and then closed the plant.

In 2001, Jeff Jirik and two former ConAgra employees, incorporated Faribault Dairy Company, Inc., re-opened the plant, and in 2002 brought back the original Treasure Cave blue cheese, now named AmaBlu, making it commercially available for the first time in 21 years.

In 2010, Swiss Valley Farms, an Iowa cooperative of over 640 dairy farm families, purchased Faribault Dairy, renamed it the Caves of Faribault, and Jirik became Vice President of Blue Cheese Operations. The plant now processes about 180,000 pounds of milk a week, yielding approximately 20,000 pounds of cheese.

== Varieties ==
AmaBlu cheese can be bought in numerous forms, including wedges and crumbles, which are often added to jucy lucys and steaks. It can also be purchased in the form of whole 6 lb. wheels.

There are two specialty AmaBlu varieties. St. Pete's Select is cave-aged for at least 100 days and is said to have a complex, complicated, and creamy flavor. AmaGorg is a variety of Gorgonzola cheese, aged at least 90 days.

== Awards ==
In 2010, AmaBlu won the "Best of Class" in the World Championship Cheese Contest hosted in Madison, Wisconsin. Since 2001, the company has received numerous state, national, and international awards and recognitions, including a Good Food Award for the St. Pete's variety in 2014.

== See also ==
- Cuisine of Minnesota
