= Pickle pizza =

Variety of pizza

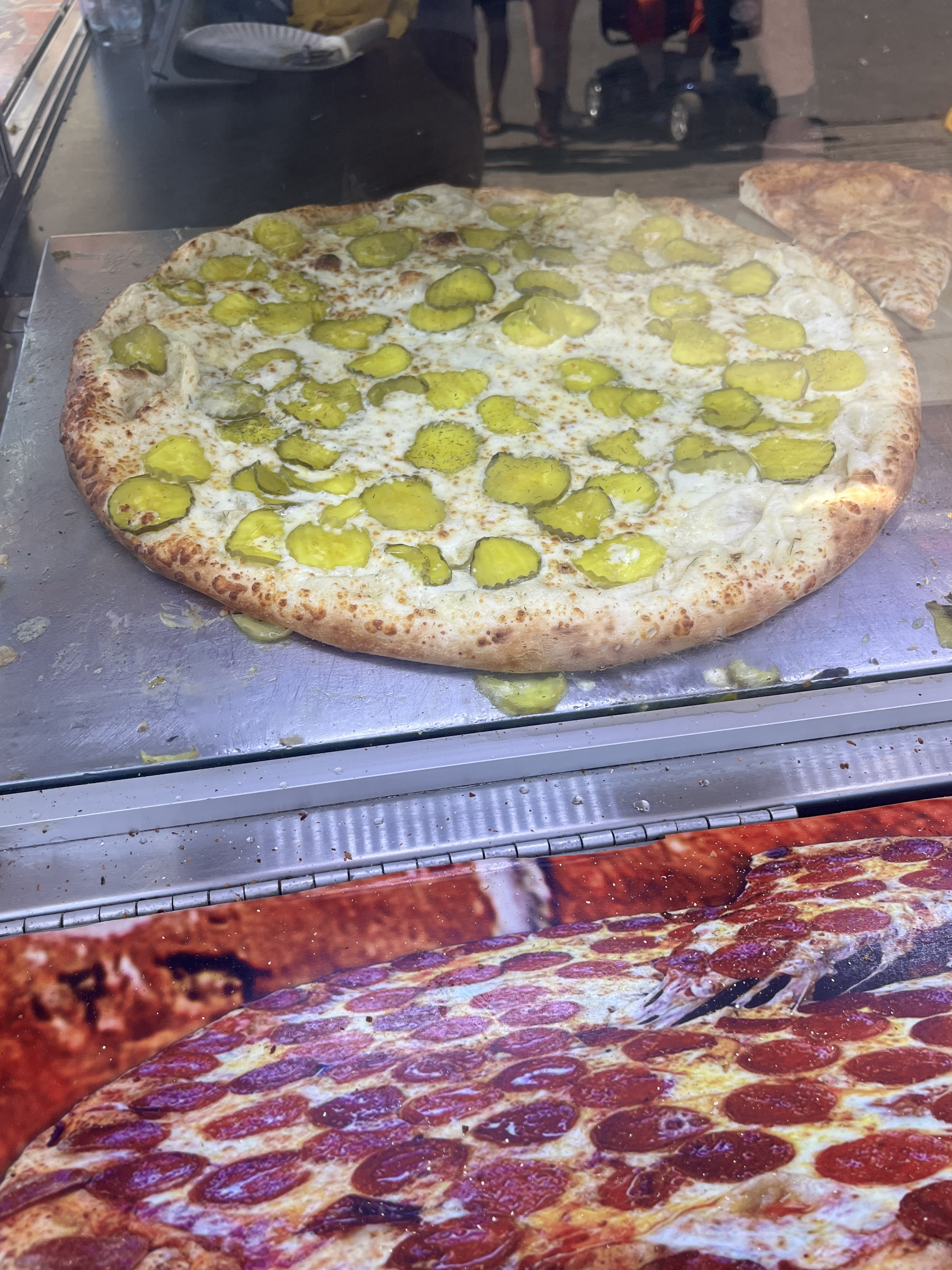
- Type: pizza
- Course: Main course
- Place of origin: disputed
- Serving temperature: hot
- Main ingredients: pickles, pizza dough, mozzarella, and white sauce

Pickle pizza is a variety of pizza consisting of pickles, mozzarella, dill, and white sauce, usually ranch or a garlic sauce. This is a dish popular in Minnesotan cuisine. It can also include Canadian bacon. The pizza became popular at the Minnesota state fair in 2019, and can be found at restaurants around the state. The pizza may be based on Minnesota sushi. This style is also popular at the Indiana state fair.

== Origins ==
This style of pizza may have originated in Sweden, Minnesota, or New York. QC Pizza in Minnesota claims to have invented the pickle pizza similar to the one found in New York around the same time. Rhino's pizzeria in Rochester, New York claims to have invented the pie in 2018. Their version includes dill weed, mozzarella, garlic sauce, and dill pickles. A restaurant in Finland serves a thin crust pizza with sour cream, pickles, mushrooms, metwurst, and capers.
