= Wild rice soup =

Soup in Minnesotan cuisine

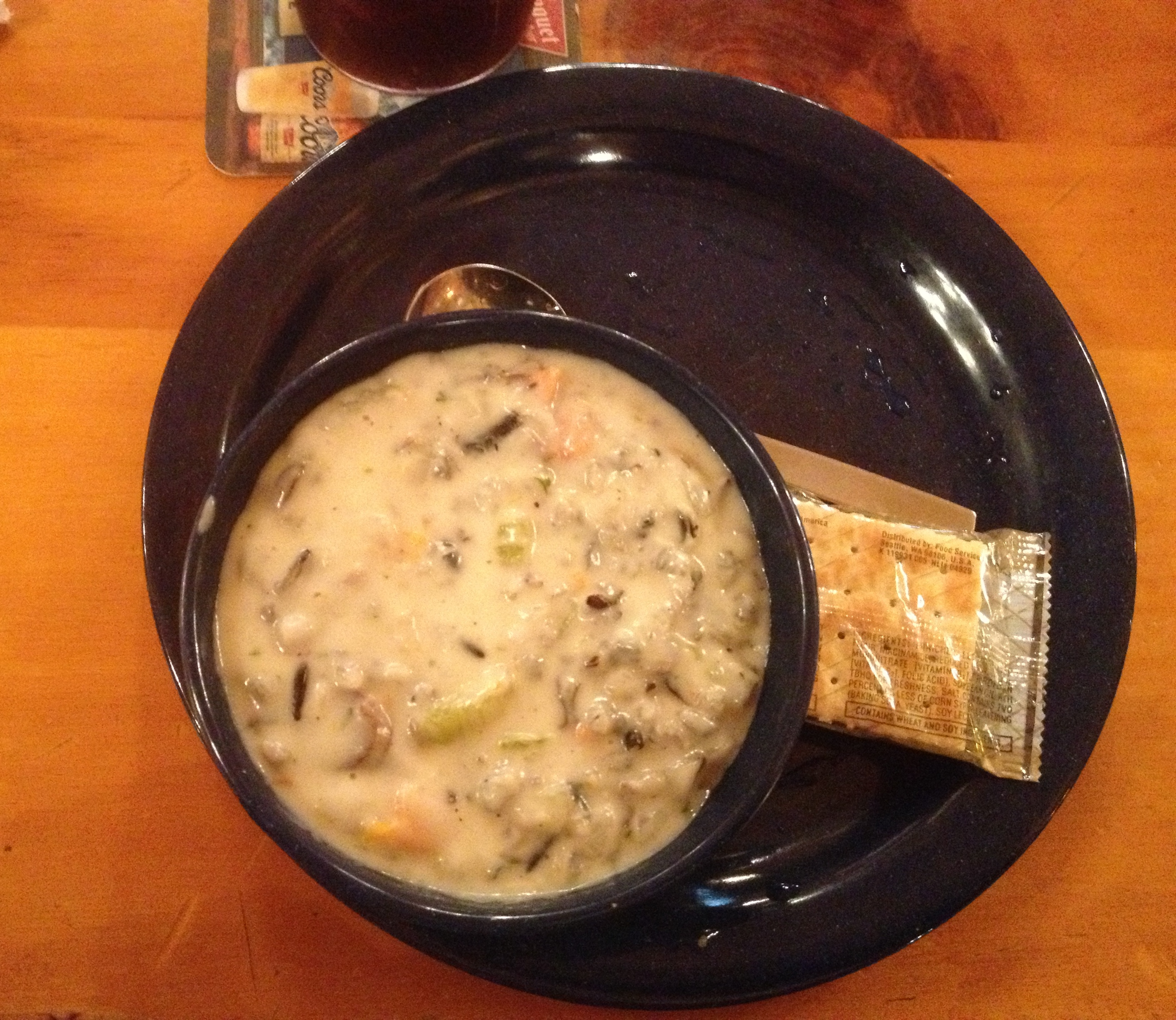
- Course: Main course
- Place of origin: Minnesota
- Region or state: Minneapolis
- Created by: Keith Kersten
- Serving temperature: Hot
- Main ingredients: Wild rice, broth, cream

Wild rice soup is a soup found in Minnesotan cuisine. It is made with a light broth (vegetable or chicken), cream, carrots, celery, and wild rice. The soup also usually contains chicken or ham. It is often considered to be one of Minnesota's most famous dishes, despite only appearing around the 1970s. It was invented by Keith Kersten at the Orion Room in Minneapolis, as a way to use up leftover wild rice, which was quite expensive at the time. the original recipe was a béchamel sauce combined with wild rice and ham.
