= Wild rice pancake =

Type of American food

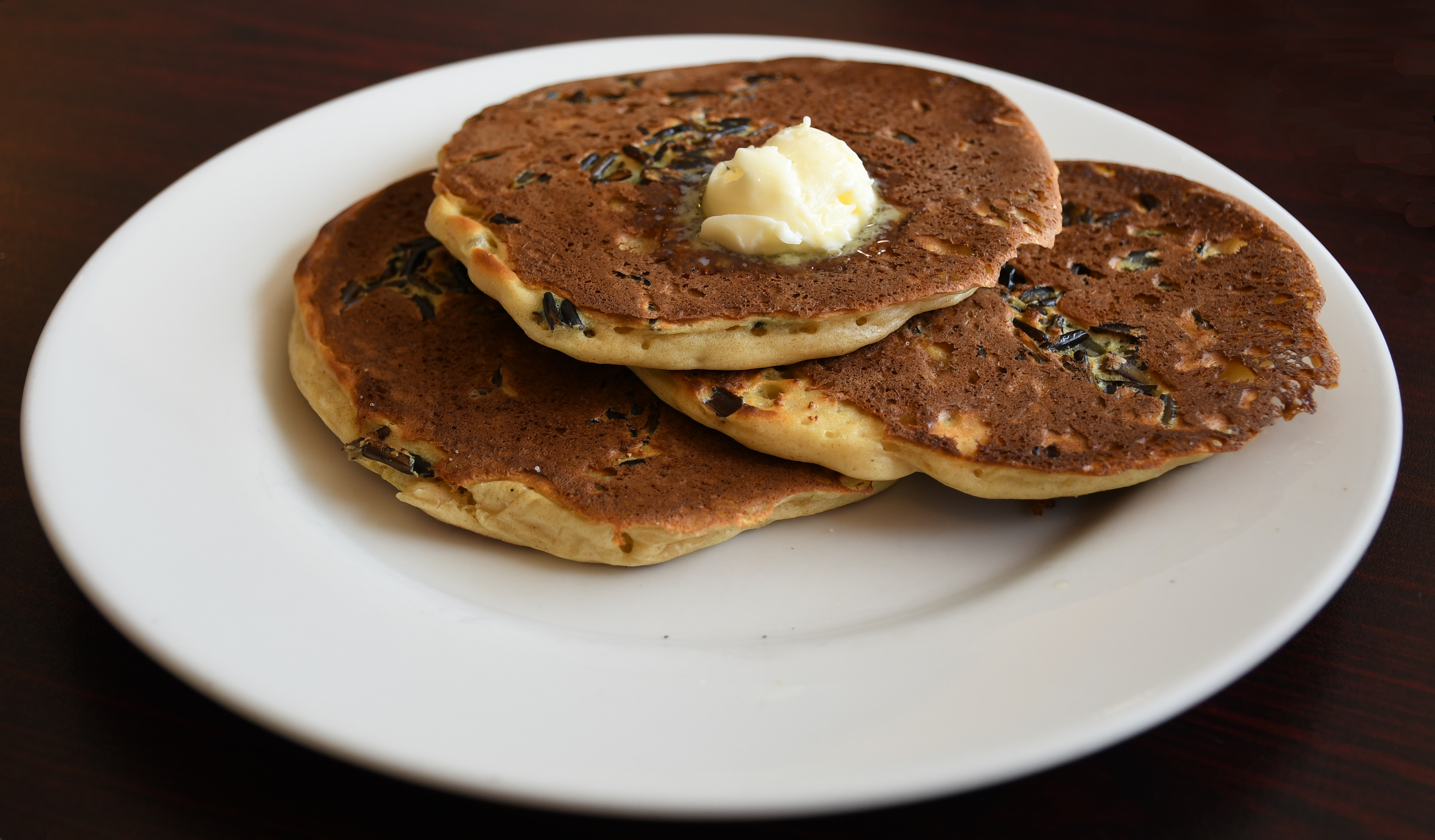
A plate of wild rice pancakes

A wild rice pancake is pancake variation that incorporates wild rice in the batter. This breakfast dish is part of Minnesotan cuisine and can be found at restaurants around the state. The dish takes inspiration from Native American cuisine. This dish can also be found at the Wild Rice Festival in Roseville, Minnesota.

Variations of the wild rice pancake include the addition of oatmeal, dried fruit, walnuts, or blueberries.
