= Hot beef commercial =

Roast beef sandwich

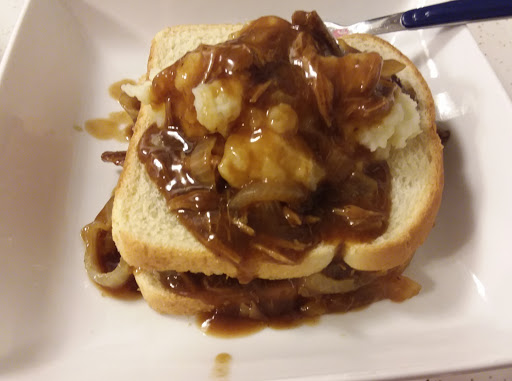
- Course: Main course
- Place of origin: Minnesota, US
- Region or state: Western Minnesota
- Serving temperature: Hot
- Main ingredients: Beef
- Variations: turkey, pulled pork

A hot beef commercial, also known as a roast beef commercial or hot beef sandwich is an open-faced sandwich, hailing from Minnesotan cuisine. It is made with white bread, brown gravy, mashed potatoes, and pot roast. The sandwich is popular café food in rural Western Minnesota and can even be found in the Twin Cities.

While the origin of the name commercial is unclear, it likely came from the target demographic for the sandwich, that being salesmen (commercial workers) who needed food that could be quickly prepared. Alternately it could be referencing the fact that the sandwich often uses commercial grade beef or commercial white bread.

The most notable variation is the hot turkey commercial, which is made with white bread, turkey gravy, mashed potatoes, and roasted turkey. This variation is typically eaten after Thanksgiving as a way to use up leftovers. Other variations include substituting beef with chicken or pulled pork.
