= South American (sandwich) =

Minced meat sandwich

- Course: Main course
- Place of origin: Minnesota, US
- Region or state: Iron Range
- Created by: Mike Giacomo
- Serving temperature: Hot
- Main ingredients: minced meats
- Variations: pepperoni

The South American is a sandwich from Minnesotan cuisine. It is similar to a sloppy joe, and originated in the Iron Range of Minnesota. The sandwich is a bar snack made of several kinds of minced meat, onions, tomatoes, peppers, and celery. An Italian variation includes chopped pepperoni.

== Origin and name ==
The sandwich was invented at the Spaghetti Inn in Gilbert, Minnesota, by Mike Giacomo, who created the sandwich from leftovers when a drunk resident turned up at the inn and demanded a meal. The etymology of the name is unknown; however, it could possibly be due to the perceived exotic nature of South America.
