= Fried walleye =

Fried fish dish

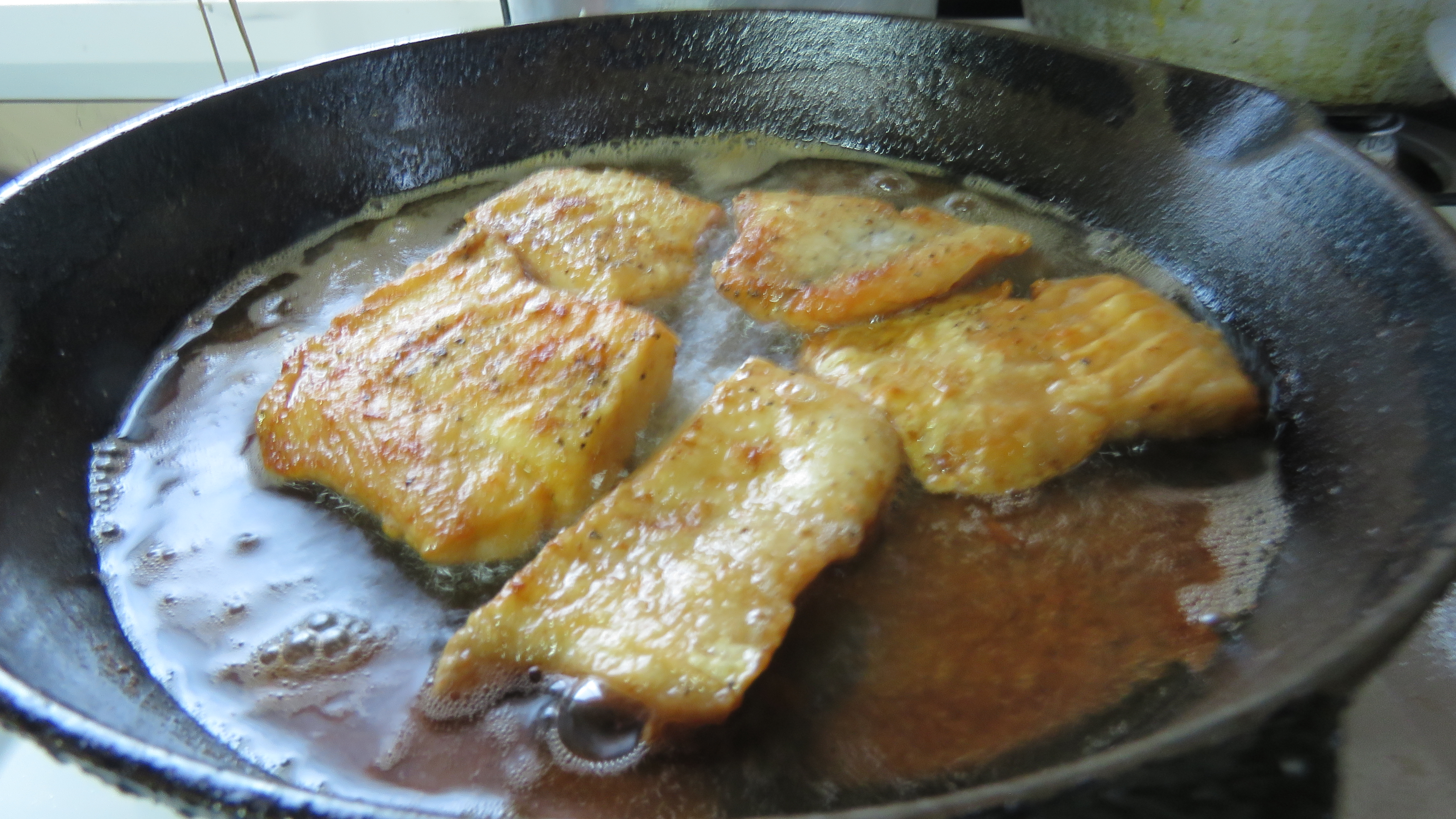
- Course: Main course, Appetizer
- Place of origin: Minnesota, Canada
- Serving temperature: Hot
- Main ingredients: Breading, walleye
- Variations: Walleye tacos, fingers, sandwiches, and on-a-stick

Fried walleye refers to several dishes made with walleye, a freshwater fish from North America. deep-frying breaded or battered walleye along with pan-frying are a popular methods of preparation, and are considered cultural foods in both Canadian and Minnesotan cuisines. One of the most common methods of preparation is cutting the filet of the walleye in strips, battering, and deep frying, these are known as walleye fingers. Battered walleye is often featured in fish frys.

== Walleye sandwich ==
A walleye sandwich is typically made with a fried walleye filet on a hard roll or burger bun, can be topped with tartar sauce, mayonnaise, lettuce, and tomato. This dish was invented in Minnesota.

== Shore lunch ==
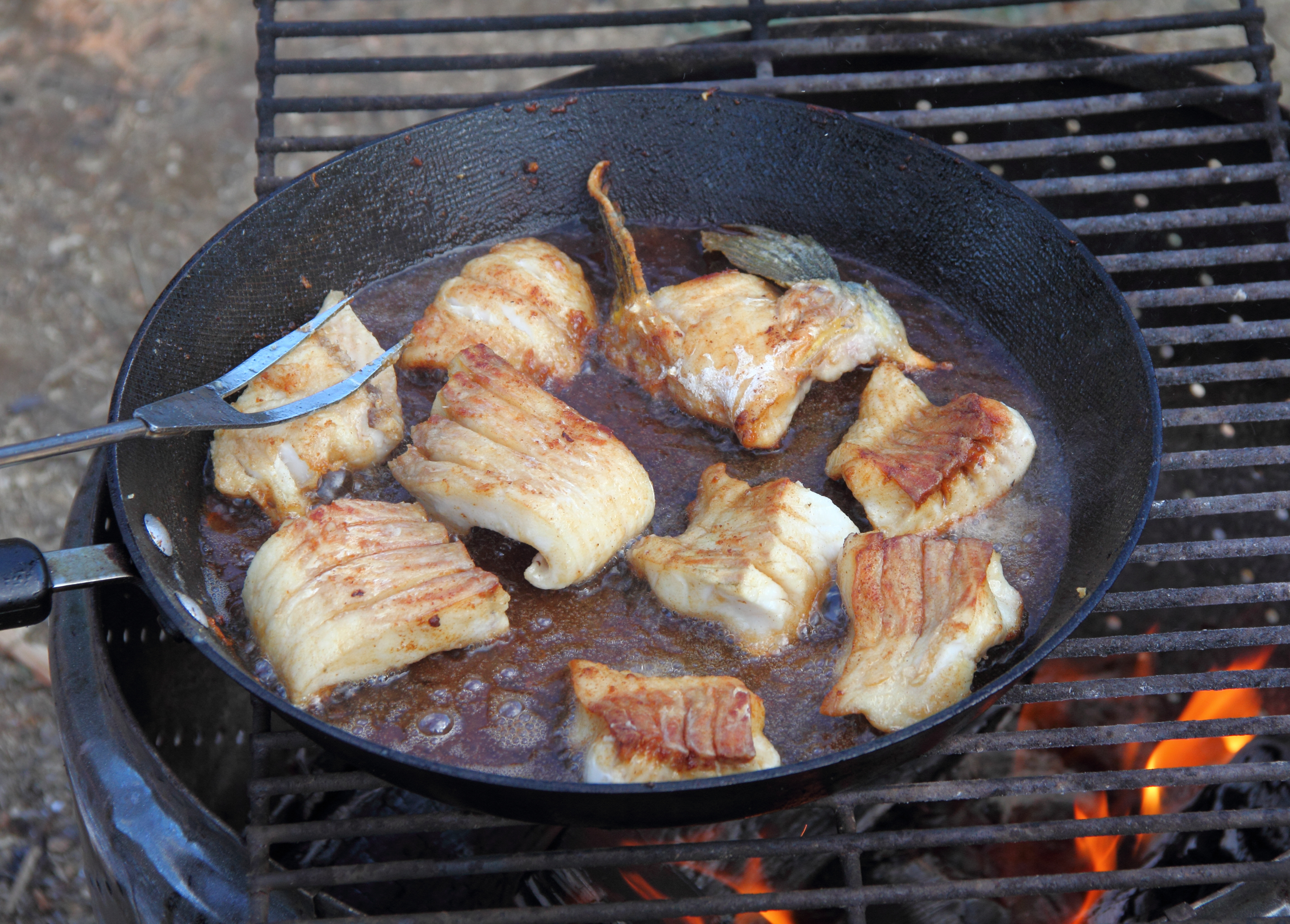
A shore lunch with walleye

While a shore lunch can be made with any palatable fish, walleye is a popular choice. Shore lunches are mainly found in the Upper Midwest and Ontario. They consist of a pan fried fish, usually cooked over an open fire, It can be served with fried potatoes, beans, bread, onion, diced bacon and some form of dessert. The fish is usually caught in a lake or river and cooked on shore, hence the name "shore lunch".

== Other ==
Deep fried walleye fish tacos are common at restaurants around the state of Minnesota. Deep-fried walleye on-a-stick is popular at the state fair of Minnesota.
