= Wild rice salad =

Cold salad in Minnesotan cuisine

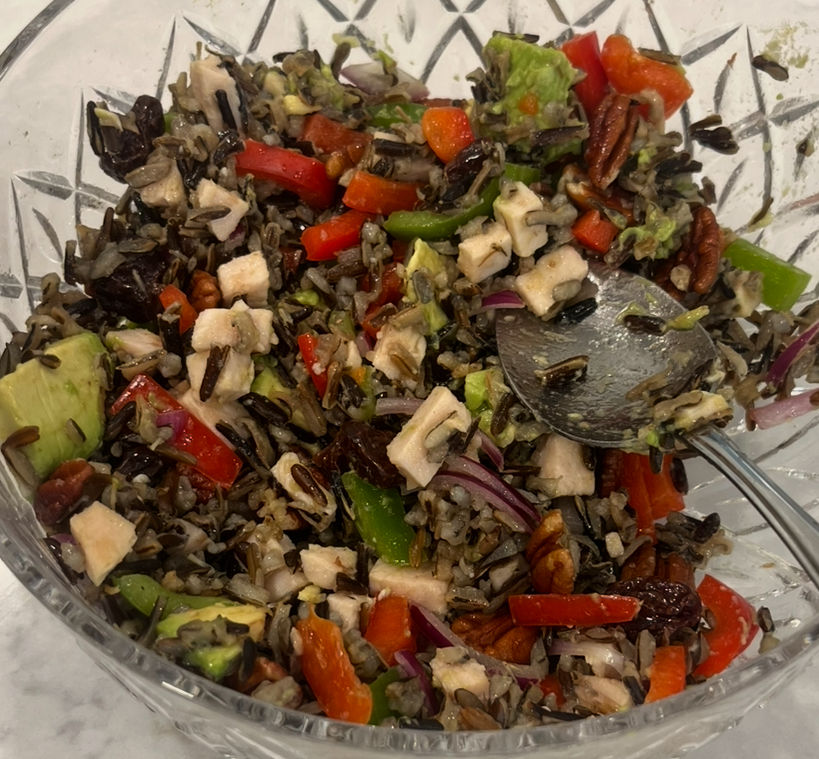
- Type: salad
- Course: Side dish, salad
- Place of origin: likely Minnesota, U.S.
- Serving temperature: cold
- Main ingredients: wild rice, dried fruits, vegetables

A wild rice salad is a cold salad from Minnesotan cuisine. It has a base of cooked wild rice, along with dried fruit, nuts, and vegetables such as red onion and carrot. It can also contain feta, diced chicken, broth, mayonnaise, herbs, and/or a light salad dressing. The salad is commonly found at holiday gatherings and potlucks.
