= Morcella =

Cheese from Minnesota, US

Morcella is a soft ripened cheese, made with pasteurized sheep milk that was produced during Spring or Summer. It is sprinkled with morel mushrooms, which is the state mushroom of Minnesota, that are harvested in Minnesota. Morcella is a semi-soft cheese with a creamy texture, strong aroma, and an earthy flavor. It is made by Shepherd's Way farms, which is located in Southern Minnesota. It is sold in grocery stores located in Minnesota such as Kowalski's, and Lunds and Byerlys. It is also sold in the Mill City farmers market and St. Paul farmers market. It is a seasonal cheese that can only be purchased during the season of September. Morcella often gets overwhelming to its strong aromas and should only be eaten with crusty bread.
