= Minnesota Grape Growers Association =

Minnesota Grape Growers Association Logo

The Minnesota Grape Growers Association (MGGA) was established in 1976 to further the art and science of growing grapes in cold climates. The association sponsors workshops, tours, tastings of locally produced wines and sponsors an important annual conference on cold climate viticulture.

In August 2013, in partnership with the University of Minnesota, the MGGA held the 5th International Cold Climate Wine Competition. This event featured over 300 different wines and was judged by a panel of 21 judges including Food and Wine writers, oenologists, wine marketers and other expert tasters. This year's winners can be found on the competition website, International Cold Climate Wine Competition.

In February 2014, the MGGA hosted the 10th Annual Cold Climate Grape & Wine Conference. This conference covers timely subject matter for growers and winemakers dealing with cold climate viticulture. It features speakers from the U.S., Canada, and Europe. It includes a wine stroll, giving a tasting of the Region's Best Cold Climate Wines. This conference is held every February in Minneapolis, Minnesota, United States of America.

In 2009, the MGGA, in partnership with the University of Minnesota and the Minnesota State Fair, established the International Cold Climate Wine Competition, to highlight wines made from cold climate grapes. Winning wines are displayed at the Minnesota State Fair, following the competition.

In 2008, the MGGA sponsored a large study in collaboration with the University of Minnesota, titled "The Economic Contribution of Grape Growers and Wineries to the State of Minnesota". The study examines the contribution that Minnesota's grape growers and wine producers made to the state's economy in 2007.
