= Big Woods Blue =

American blue cheese made with sheep milk

Big Woods Blue is an artisan blue cheese made with pasteurized sheep milk. It is creamy, firm, and has a complex, spicy flavor. It is aged 6–8 months. It is made by Shepherd's Way farms, which is located in Southern Minnesota. It is sold in grocery stores located in Minnesota such as Kowalski's, and Lunds and Byerlys. It is also sold in the Mill City farmers market and St. Paul farmers market. It was named after Big Woods state park, Minnesota.
