= Potatiskorv =

Swedish sausage

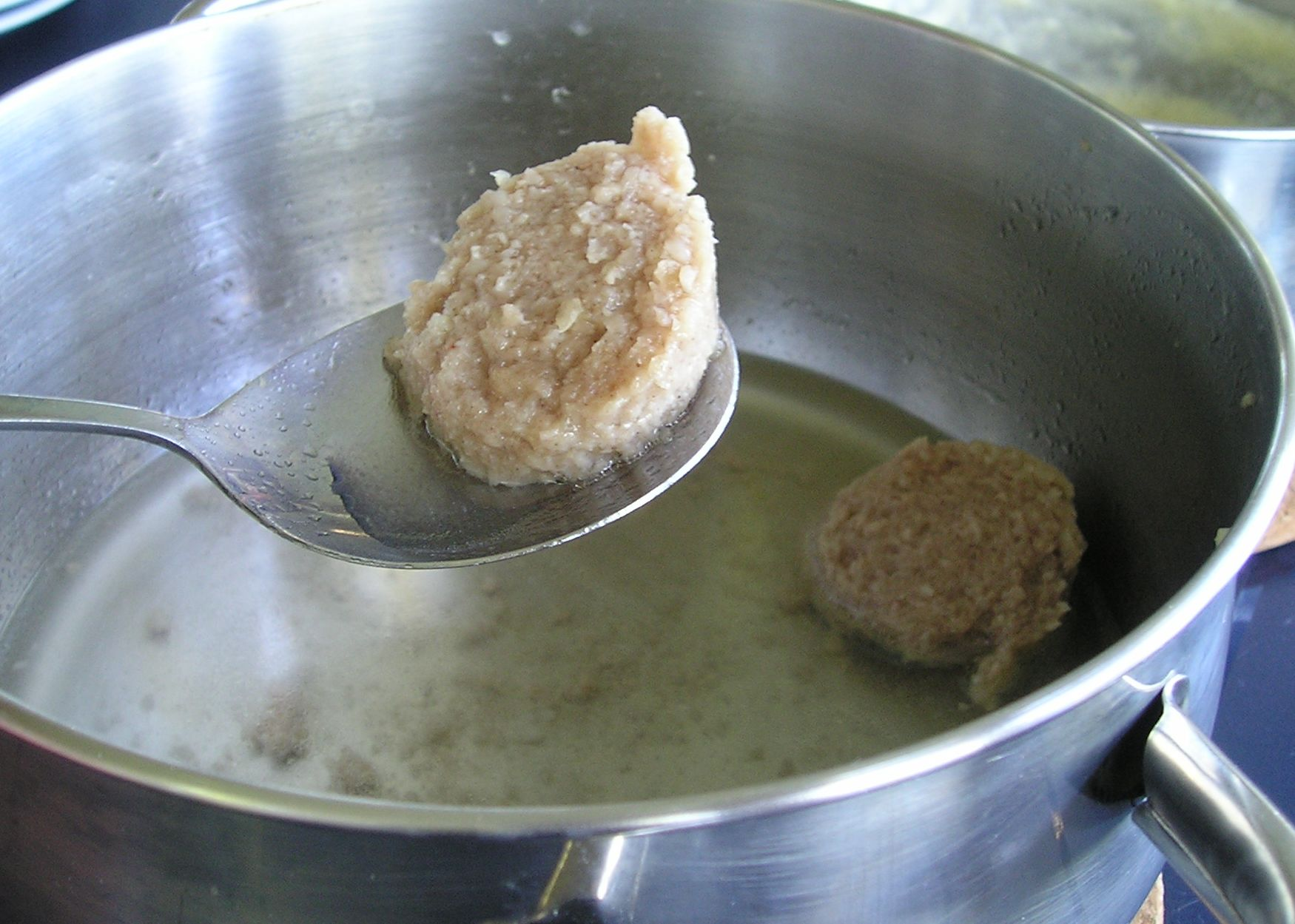
A slice of potatiskorv, which in Sweden is better known as Värmlandskorv.

Potatiskorv (more commonly known as Värmlandskorv in Sweden) is a regional Swedish sausage from Värmland, made with ground pork, beef, onions, and potatoes. Potatiskorv is traditionally served hot at Christmas in Värmland but often served hot or cold throughout the year. Potatiskorv is what this sausage is called in parts of Värmland. In most parts of Sweden, the word potatiskorv is unknown, while Värmlandskorv is well known and sold commercially around Christmas throughout the country, for the benefit of people from Värmland. In the United States, potatiskorv (usually written potatis korv) is the name that has stuck among people with Swedish roots.

There is also a local sausage in parts of Småland known as potatiskorv, mentioned in the Emil children's books by Astrid Lindgren. However, that sausage contains no beef, only potatoes and pork.

== See also ==
- List of sausages
