= Walleye (disambiguation) =

Walleye is a freshwater fish native to most of Canada and the northern United States.

Walleye may also refer to:

- Blue walleye, a subspecies of walleye that became extinct in the 1970s
- AGM-62 Walleye, a television-guided glide bomb used during the 1960s
- Wisconsin Walleye War, a 1987–1991 episode of civil unrest over the hunting and fishing rights of Chippewas outside of their reservation
- Toledo Walleye, a professional ice hockey team based in Toledo, Ohio
- Conditions relating to eyes
  - Strabismus, in which the two eyes do not point in the same direction
  - a variety of heterochromia, in which one eye has a white or blue-ish white iris
  - eyeshine, as of the walleye fish
- Wall eye, one name for a horse's blue eye
- Wall Eyes, supernatural phenomena in Araki's Jojolion
