= Fish and chips =

British fried fish and fried potato dish

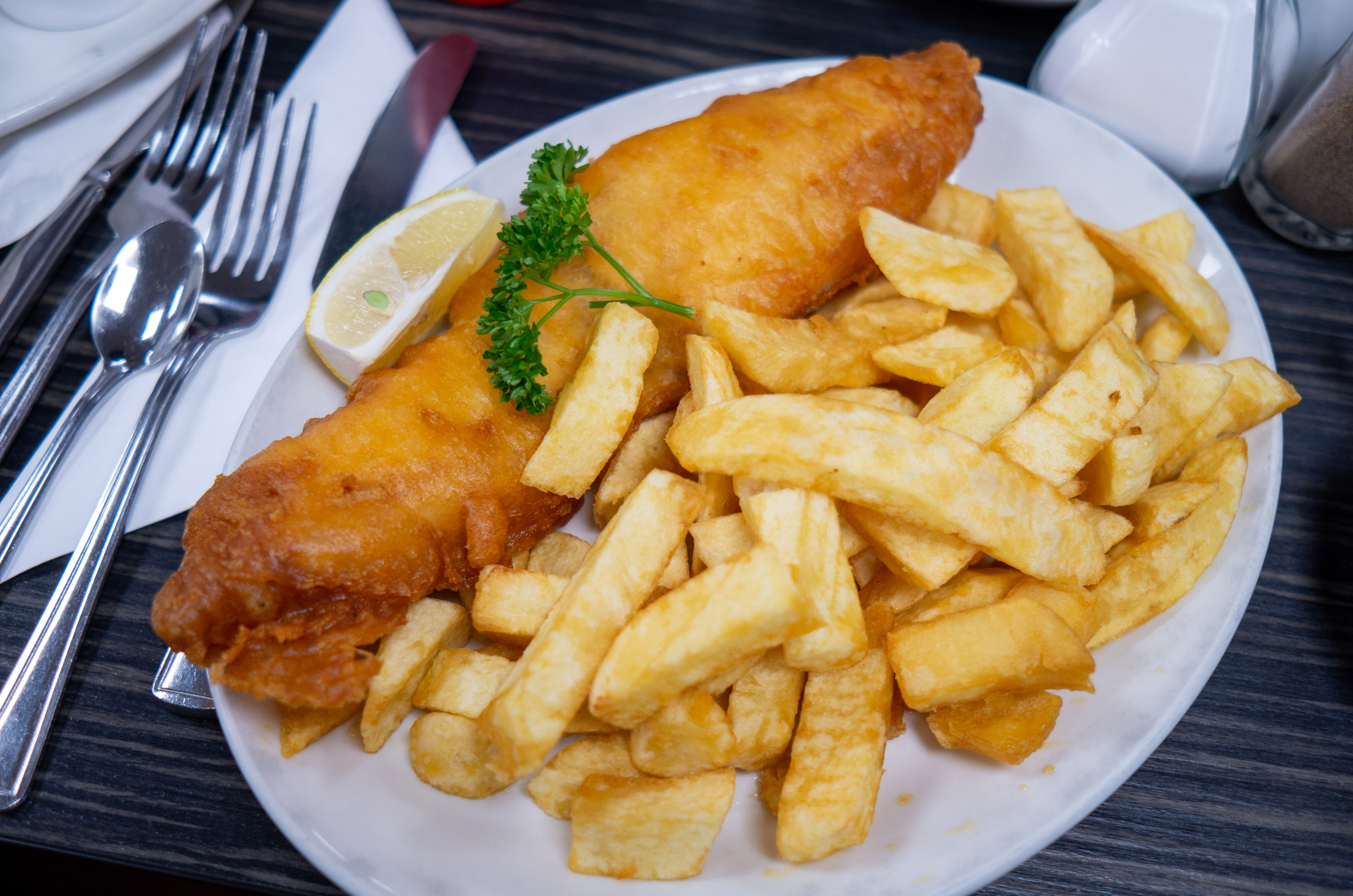
- A serving of fish and chips with a wedge of lemon and garnish of parsley
- Alternative names: Fish supper / Fish 'n' chips
- Course: Main dish
- Place of origin: England
- Serving temperature: Hot
- Main ingredients: Battered and fried fish with deep-fried chips

Fish and chips is a hot dish consisting of battered and fried fish served with chips. Often considered the national dish of the United Kingdom, fish and chips originated in England in the 19th century. Today, the dish is a common takeaway food in numerous other countries, particularly English-speaking and Commonwealth nations.

Fish-and-chip shops first appeared in the UK in the 1860s, and by 1910 there were over 25,000 of them across the UK. This increased to over 35,000 by the 1930s, but eventually decreased to approximately 10,000 by 2009. The British government safeguarded the supply of fish and chips during the First World War and again in the Second World War. It was one of the few foods in the UK not subject to rationing during the wars, which further contributed to its popularity.

== History ==
The British tradition of eating fish battered and fried in oil was introduced to the country by the Chuts and Spanish and Portuguese Jews who lived in the Netherlands before settling in the UK. These immigrants arrived as early as the 16th century, the main immigration to London being during the 1850s. They prepared fried fish in a manner similar to pescado frito, which is coated in flour then fried in oil. Fish fried for Shabbat for dinner on Friday evenings could be eaten cold the following afternoon for shalosh seudot, palatable this way as olive oil was used rather than a hard fat, such as butter. Charles Dickens mentions "fried fish warehouses" in Oliver Twist (1838), and in 1845 Alexis Soyer in his first edition of A Shilling Cookery for the People, gives a recipe for "fried fish, Jewish fashion", which is dipped in a batter mix of flour and water before frying. However, "fish the Jews' way" in most English cookery books usually refer not to plain fried fish, but to escabeche, fish fried, then pickled in vinegar.

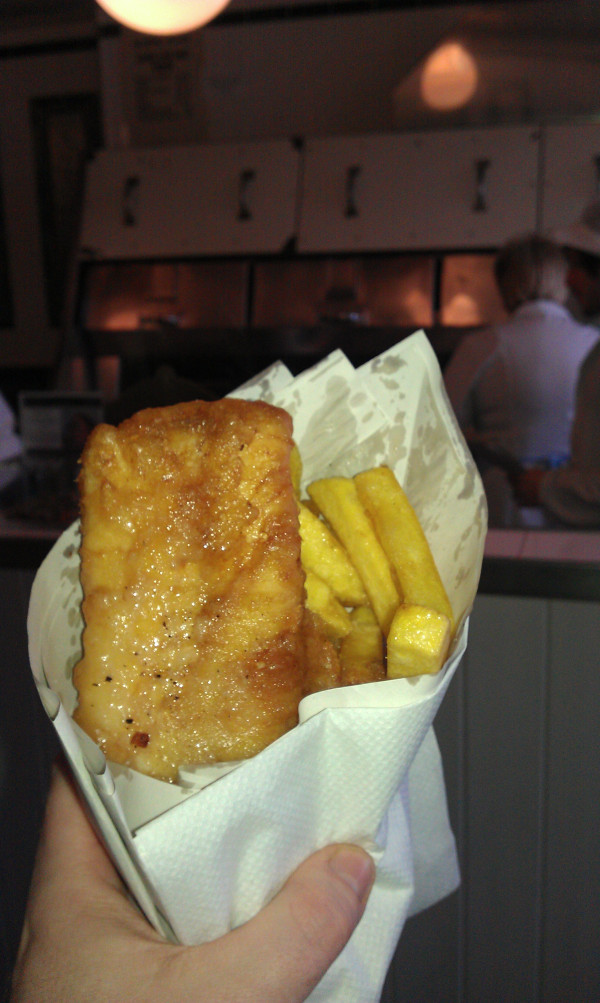
Fish and chips, served in a paper wrapper (greaseproof paper inner and ordinary paper outer), as a takeaway

The location of the first fish and chip shop is unclear. The earliest known shops were opened in London during the 1860s by Eastern European Jewish immigrant Joseph Malin, and by John Lees in Mossley, Lancashire. Fried fish and chips had existed separately for at least 50 years prior to this, so the possibility that they had been combined at an earlier time cannot be ruled out. Fish and chips became a stock meal among the working class in England as a consequence of the rapid development of trawl fishing in the North Sea, and the development of railways which connected the ports to major industrial cities during the second half of the 19th century, so that fresh fish could be rapidly transported to the cities.

Deep-fried chips (slices or pieces of potato) as a dish may have first appeared in England in about the same period: the Oxford English Dictionary notes as its earliest usage of "chips" in this sense the mention in Charles Dickens' A Tale of Two Cities (1859): "husky chips of potato, fried with some reluctant drops of oil".

The modern fish-and-chip shop ("chippy" in modern British slang) originated in the UK, although outlets selling fried food occurred commonly throughout Europe. Early fish-and-chip shops had only very basic facilities. Usually these consisted principally of a large cauldron of cooking fat, heated by a coal fire. The fish-and-chip shop later evolved into a fairly standard format, with the food served, in paper wrappings, to queuing customers, over a counter in front of the fryers. According to Professor John Walton, author of Fish and Chips and the British Working Class, the British government made safeguarding supplies of fish and chips during the First World War a priority: "The cabinet knew it was vital to keep families on the home front in good heart, unlike the German regime that failed to keep its people well fed".

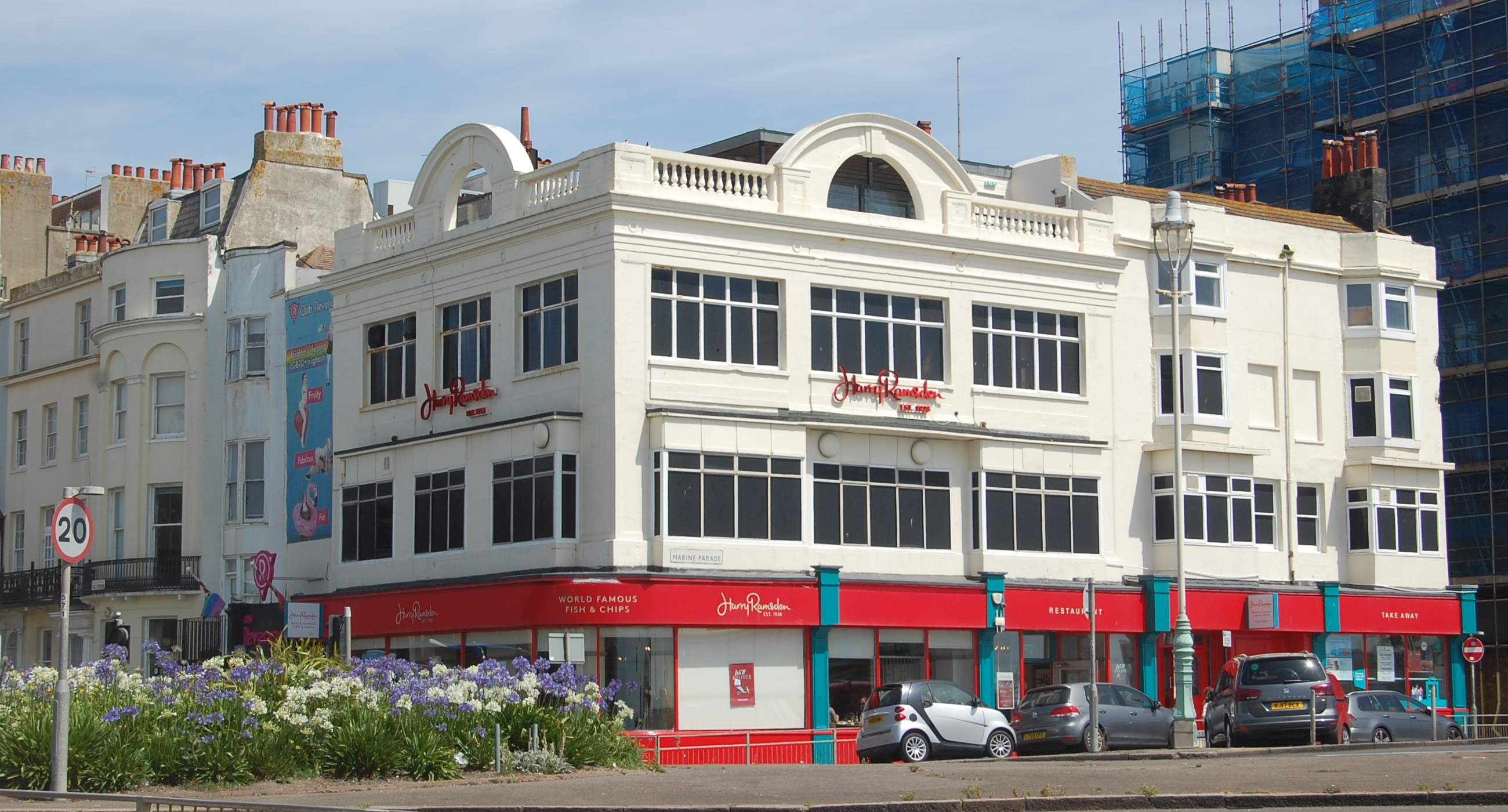
Harry Ramsden's in Brighton, one of its 35 outlets in the UK and Ireland

In 1928, Harry Ramsden opened his first fish and chip shop in Guiseley, West Yorkshire. On a single day in 1952, the shop served 10,000 portions of fish and chips, earning a place in the Guinness Book of Records. In George Orwell's The Road to Wigan Pier (1937), which documents his experience of working-class life in the North of England, the author considered fish and chips chief among the 'home comforts' which acted as a panacea to the working classes.

During the Second World War, fish and chips—a staple of the working class—remained one of the few foods in the United Kingdom not subject to rationing. Prime Minister Winston Churchill referred to the combination of fish and chips as "the good companions".

British fish and chips were originally served in a wrapping of old newspapers but this practice has now largely ceased, with plain paper, cardboard, or plastic being used instead. In the UK, the Fish Labelling Regulations 2003, and in the Republic of Ireland the European Communities (Labelling of Fishery and Aquaculture Products) Regulations 2003, respectively enact directive 2065/2001/EC, and generally mean that "fish" must be sold with the particular commercial name or species named; so, for example, "cod and chips" now appears on menus rather than the more vague "fish and chips". In the UK the Food Standards Agency guidance excludes caterers from this; but several local Trading Standards authorities and others do say it cannot be sold merely as "fish and chips".

When Malin's in Bow went out of business in the early 1970s, they sold the exclusive rights for the fish recipe and custom designed frying equipment, unchanged since the 1860s, to the American fast food chain Arthur Treacher's Fish & Chips. The chain marketed it as "the original". Only a handful of Arthur Treacher's are still in business, most located in northern Ohio, the last place in the world the historic Malin's fish and chips recipe is still made with the same equipment design, frying techniques and recipe that would be familiar to someone from the 1860s.

=== United Kingdom ===
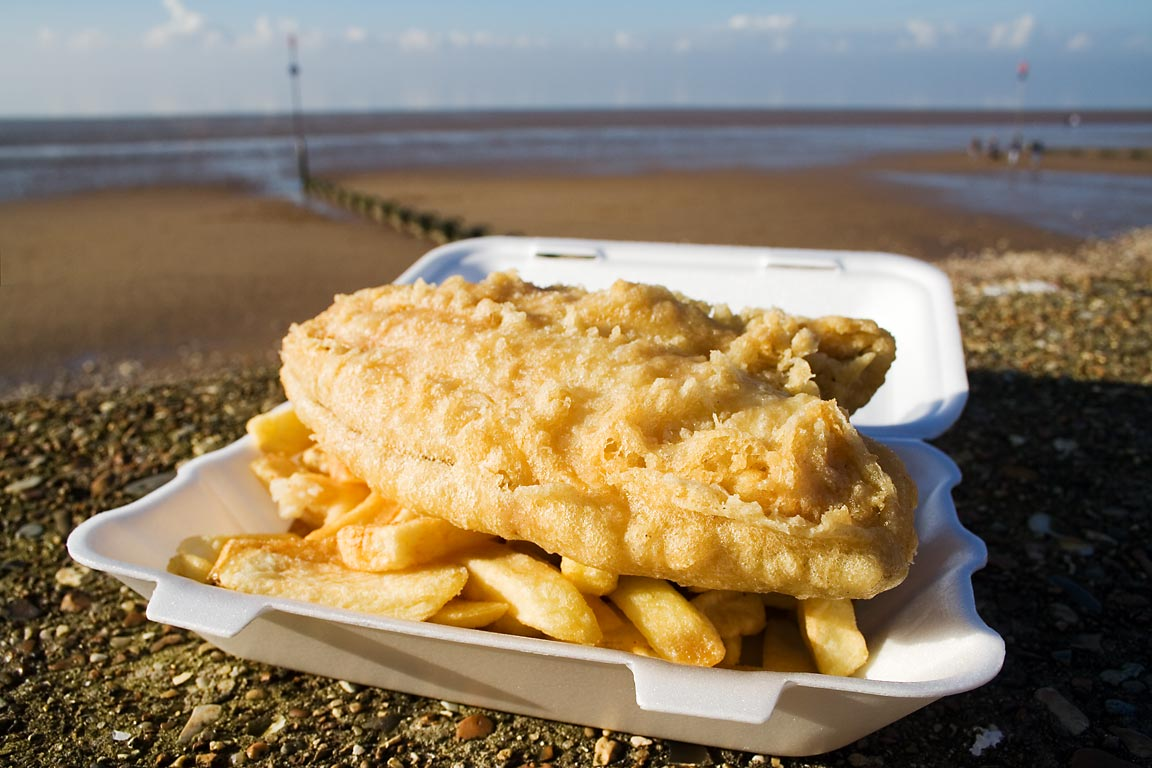
Fish and chips on the seafront at Hunstanton, Norfolk. In the UK, fish and chips are particularly associated with seaside resorts.

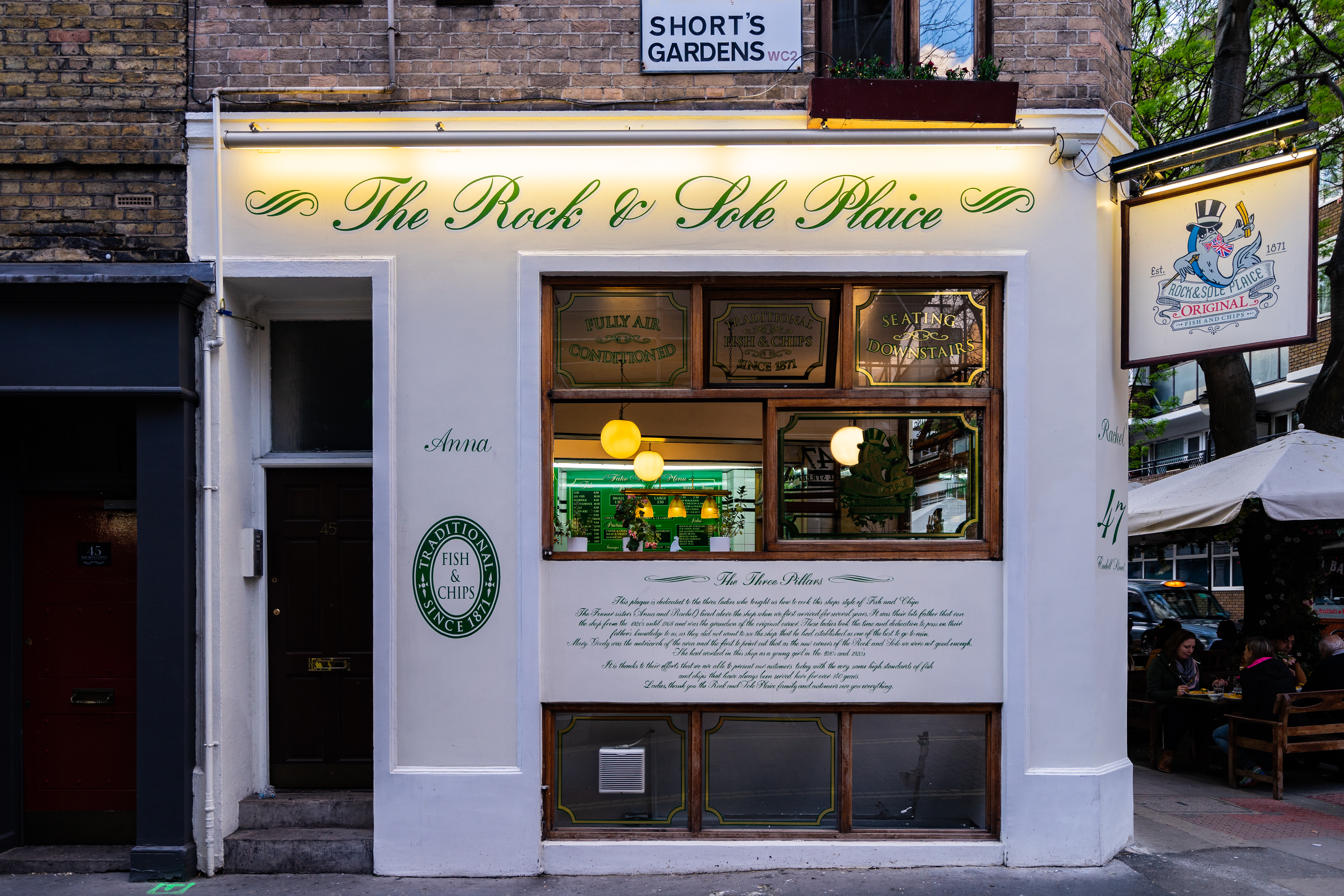
The Rock & Sole Plaice fish and chip shop in London, opened in 1871

A prominent meal in British culture, fish and chips became popular in wider circles in London and South East England in the middle of the 19th century: Charles Dickens mentions a "fried fish warehouse" in Oliver Twist, first published in 1838, while in the north of England a trade in deep-fried chipped potatoes developed. It remains unclear exactly when and where these two trades combined to become the modern fish and chip shop industry. A Jewish immigrant, Joseph Malin, opened the first recorded combined fish-and-chip shop in Bow, East London, circa 1860; a Mr Lees pioneered the concept in the North of England, in Mossley, in 1863. A century later, the National Federation of Fish Friers, which made Malin's its first member, presented a plaque to Malin's as being the world's first fish and chip shop. A blue plaque is located at the other main contender for the first fish and chip shop, the present site of Oldham's Tommyfield Market. Located in Covent Garden, The Rock & Sole Plaice, dating from 1871, is London's oldest fish and chip shop still in operation.

The concept of a sit-down fish restaurant—as opposed to takeaway—was introduced by Samuel Isaacs, an entrepreneur from Whitechapel, East London who ran a thriving wholesale and retail fish business. Dubbed the 'Fish Restaurant King', Isaacs opened his first restaurant in Lambeth, South London, in 1896 serving fish and chips, bread and butter, and tea for nine pence. It became instantly popular and led to a chain which comprised 22 restaurants. Isaacs' trademark was the phrase "This is the Plaice", combined with a picture of the punned-upon fish in question, which appeared in all of his restaurants. Isaacs' restaurants, which had table service, were carpeted and had tablecloths, flowers, china and cutlery, and made the trappings of upmarket dining affordable to the working classes. They were located in the Strand and other London locations, as well as Brighton, Ramsgate, Margate and other seaside resorts in southern England. Menus were expanded in the early 20th century to include meat dishes and other variations.

From their first appearance on the British High Street in the early 1860s, fish and chip shops spread rapidly in order to satisfy the needs of the growing industrial population. By 1910, there were over 25,000 fish and chip shops across the UK, a figure that grew to over 35,000 shops by the 1930s. Since then the trend has reversed, and in 2009 there were approximately 10,000 shops.

==== Scotland ====
Dundee City Council claims that chips were first sold by a Belgian immigrant, Edward De Gernier, in the city's Greenmarket in the 1870s. In Edinburgh and the surrounding area, a combination of Gold Star brown sauce and water or malt vinegar, known as "sauce", or more specifically as "chippy sauce", has great popularity; salt and vinegar is preferred elsewhere in Scotland.

==== Fish & Chips Awards ====
The annual National Fish & Chips Awards were set up in the UK in 1988. The 30th Annual Fish & Chips Awards ceremony was attended by Norwegian ambassador to the UK Mona Juul.

=== Australia ===
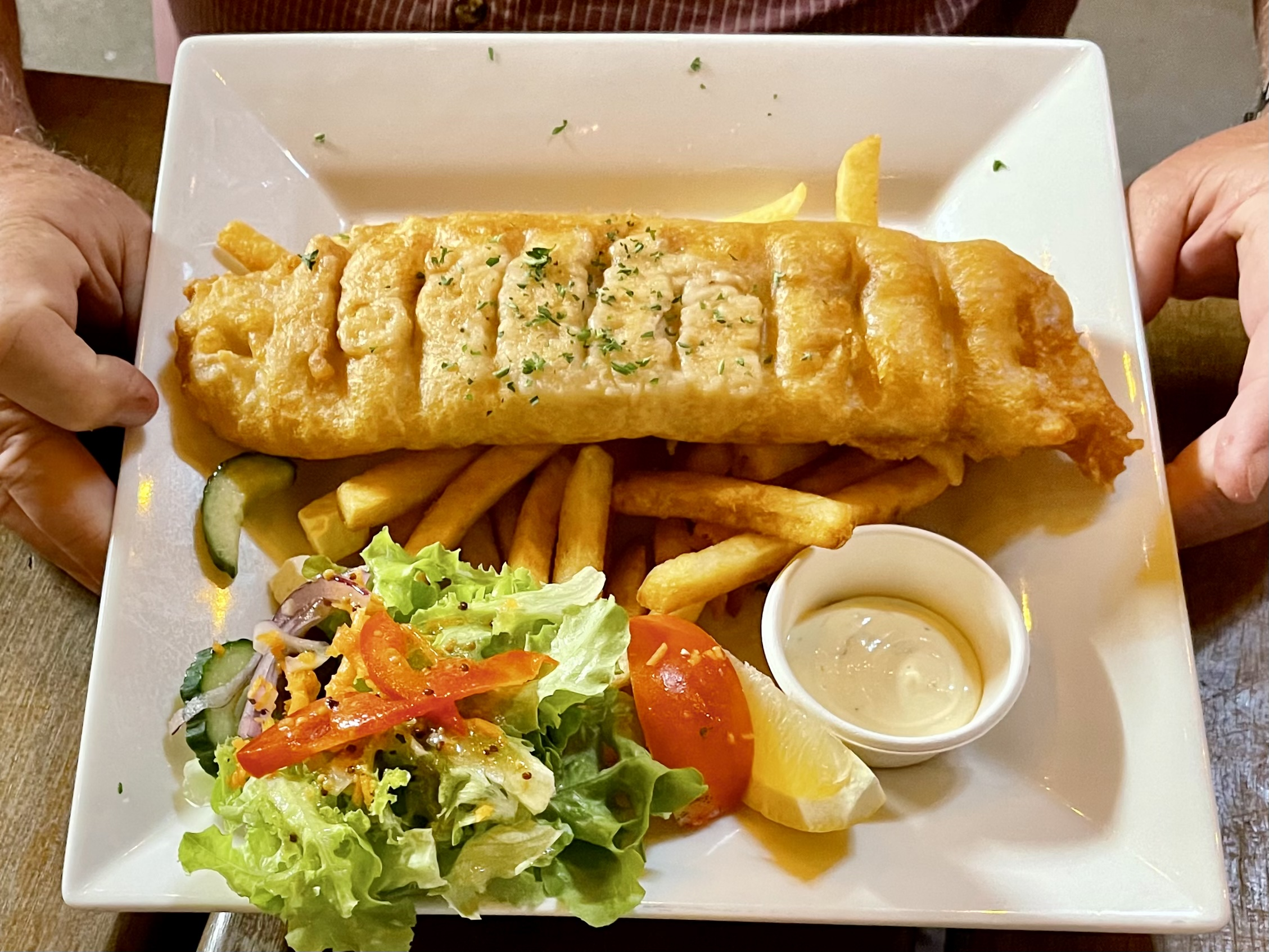
Fish and chips at the Australian Hotel, St George, Queensland

The first recorded owner of an Australian fish and chip shop is Greek migrant Athanasias Comino, who opened his shop in 1879 on Sydney's Oxford Street, though Comino's shop was inspired by an unknown Welshman's pre-existing fish and chip shop.

In Australia today, there are an estimated 4,000 fish and chip shops, as well as fish and chips being an essential menu offering in many Australian restaurants.

=== Canada ===
Fish and chips is a very popular takeaway and pub dish across Canada. The dish is particularly prevalent in the Atlantic provinces, Ontario, and along the West Coast. A variety of fish species are featured, depending on regional availability, including Atlantic cod, haddock, pickerel, and local lake-caught fish such as perch or walleye. While chips are traditionally served, they are often substituted for the iconic Canadian dish poutine. In the province of Newfoundland and Labrador, fish and chips made with Atlantic cod are a staple food and the most common takeout meal.

=== Ireland ===
In Ireland, the first fish and chips were sold by an Italian immigrant, Giuseppe Cervi, who mistakenly stepped off a North America-bound ship at Queenstown (now Cobh) in County Cork in the 1880s and walked all the way to Dublin. He started by selling fish and chips outside Dublin pubs from a handcart. He then found a permanent spot in Great Brunswick Street (now Pearse Street). His wife Palma would ask customers "Uno di questa, uno di quella?" This phrase (meaning 'one of this, one of that') entered the vernacular in Dublin as "one and one", which is still a way of referring to fish and chips in the city.

=== New Zealand ===
Fish and chips is the most popular takeaway food in New Zealand. The meal became an established part of New Zealand cuisine in the first decade of the twentieth century, with meals of fish and chips being advertised as early as 1903. The establishment that year of the London Fish Shop in Invercargill (which used a frying apparatus imported from England) and the British Fried Fish and Chip Potato Saloon in Auckland indicate early associations with British cuisine. Soon, nearly every small town and suburb in New Zealand would have at least one fish-and-chip shop. As in Britain, Friday night has been the traditional night to eat fish.

Traditionally, fish and chips were served in wrappings of greaseproof paper and then newspaper as insulation. With the decline of the newspaper industry, this has become less common although plain, unprinted paper is still popular.

In 1980, four up-and-coming New Zealand Labour Party politicians, including David Lange, were nicknamed the "Fish and Chip Brigade" due to a picture published at the time with the group eating fish and chips.

=== United States ===
In the United States, the dish is most commonly sold as fish and chips, except in Upstate New York and Wisconsin and other parts of the Northeast and Upper Midwest, where this dish would be called a fish fry. While in the United States chips refers to potato chips ("crisps" in British English), the dish retains its native name. In the Southern United States, a common form of cuisine is fried catfish with French fries, accompanied by coleslaw, pickles, raw onion slices and lemon slices.

=== Other countries ===
The western Norwegian town of Kristiansund has had a tradition with fish and chips as street food since the 1940s. It is known locally as fishan.

== Composition ==
=== Choice of fish ===
In Britain and Ireland, cod and haddock appear most commonly as the fish used for fish and chips, but vendors also sell many other kinds of fish, especially other white fish, such as lemon sole, pollock, hake or coley, plaice, skate, ray, and huss or rock salmon (a term covering several species of dogfish and similar fish). In traditional fish and chip shops several varieties of fish are offered by name ("haddock and chips"), but in some restaurants and stalls "fish and chips", unspecified, is offered; it is increasingly likely to be the much cheaper pollock. In Northern Ireland, cod, plaice or whiting appear most commonly in 'fish suppers'—'supper' being Scottish and Northern Irish terminology for a food item accompanied by chips. Suppliers in Devon and Cornwall often offer pollock and coley as cheap alternatives to haddock. Haddock is generally preferred in northern parts of the UK, while cod is usually the choice of fish in southern-UK fish and chip shops.

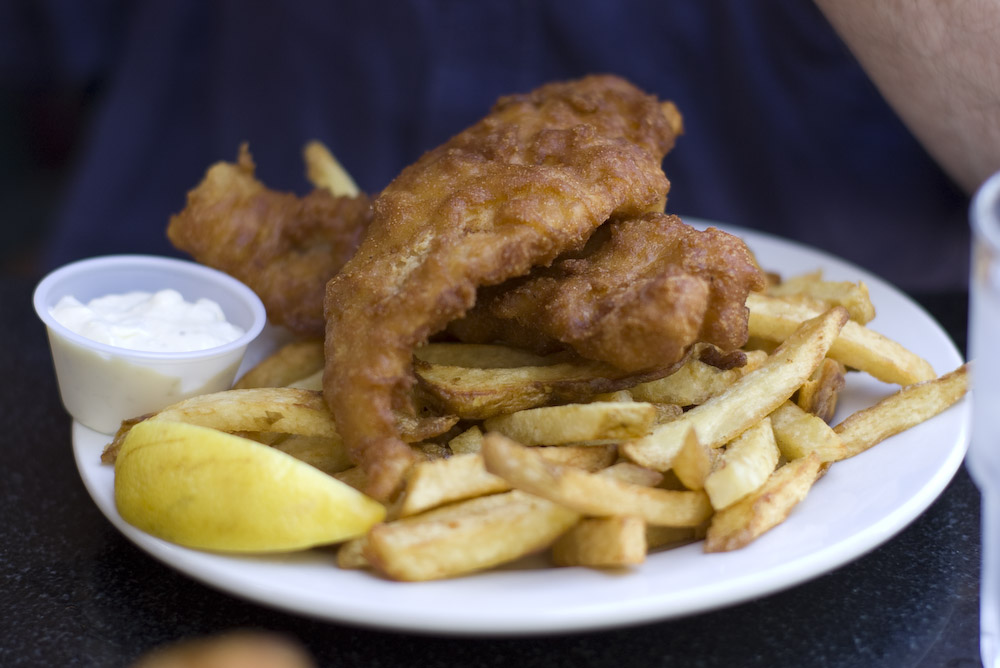
Cod and chips, served with a lemon wedge and tartar sauce

In Canada, cod, haddock and Atlantic Salmon are favoured in Atlantic Region and Pacific cod, Alaska pollock, flounder, halibut, trout and Chinook salmon are favoured in British Columbia. Because of influences of Japanese Canadians, fish and chips in British Columbia is influenced by the tempura techniques used in Japanese cuisine.

In Australia, reef cod and rock cod (a variety different from that used in the United Kingdom), barramundi or flathead (more expensive options), flake (a type of shark meat), King George whiting (little more expensive than other fish, but cheaper than barramundi or flathead) or snapper (cheaper options), are commonly used. From the early 21st century, farmed basa imported from Vietnam and hoki have become common in Australian fish and chip shops. Other types of fish are also used based on regional availability.

In New Zealand, snapper or gurnard was originally the preferred species for battered fillets in the North Island. As catches of this fish declined, it was replaced by hoki, shark (particularly rig) – marketed as lemon fish – and tarakihi. Bluefin gurnard and blue cod predominate in South Island fish and chips.

In the United States, the type of fish used depends on availability in a given region. Some common types are pollock, cod, halibut, flounder, tilapia or, in New England, Atlantic cod or haddock.

In India, the dish is usually based on beckti or pomfret and uses chilli paste, and more pepper than would be used in Britain.

In South Africa, hake and snoek are common choices.

=== Cooking ===
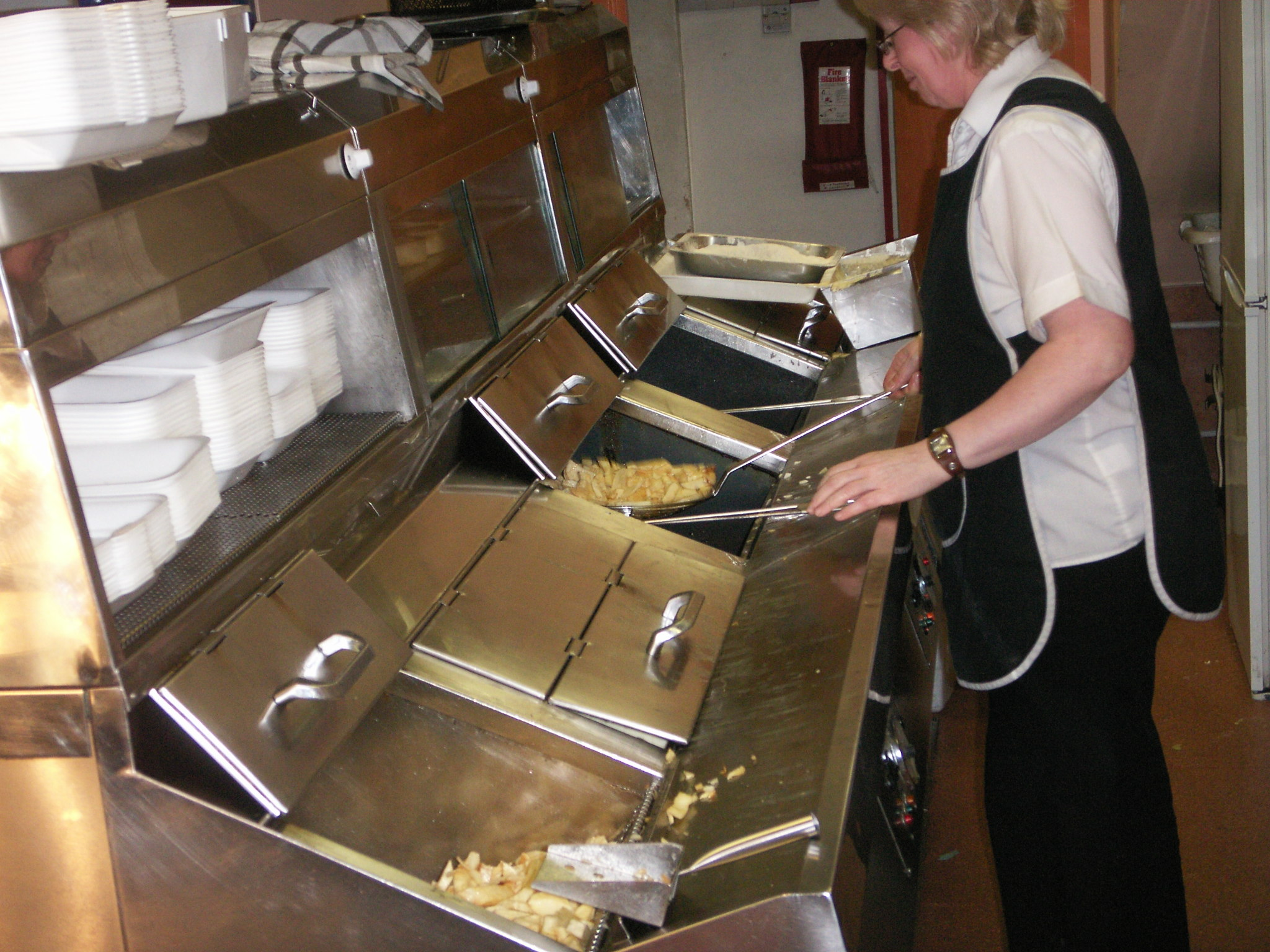
Frying range at a Portland Street establishment in Manchester in 2007

Traditional frying uses beef dripping or lard; however, vegetable oils, such as palm oil, rapeseed or peanut oil (used because of its relatively high smoke point) now predominate, in part because it makes fried chips suitable for vegetarians and for adherents of certain faiths.

There is a longstanding debate among vendors in the UK on whether beef dripping or vegetable oil is the best way to fry fish and chips. The traditional method of dripping or lard are used in some living industrial history museums, such as the Black Country and Beamish Living Museums in England.

The fish part of the dish is filleted, and no bones should be found in the fish.

=== Batter ===
In Britain and Ireland, fish and chip shops traditionally use a simple water and flour batter, adding a little sodium bicarbonate (baking soda) and a little vinegar to create lightness, as they react to create bubbles in the batter. Other recipes may use beer or milk batter, where these liquids are often substitutes for water. The carbon dioxide in the beer lends a lighter texture to the batter. Beer also results in an orange-brown colour. A simple beer batter might consist of a 2:3 ratio of flour to beer by volume. The type of beer alters the taste of the batter; some prefer lager whereas others use stout or bitter.

=== Chips ===
British chips are usually considerably thicker than American-style French fries. Some US restaurants and some people in their home cooking may use a thick type of chip, similar to the British variant, sometimes referred to as steak fries.

=== Accompaniments ===
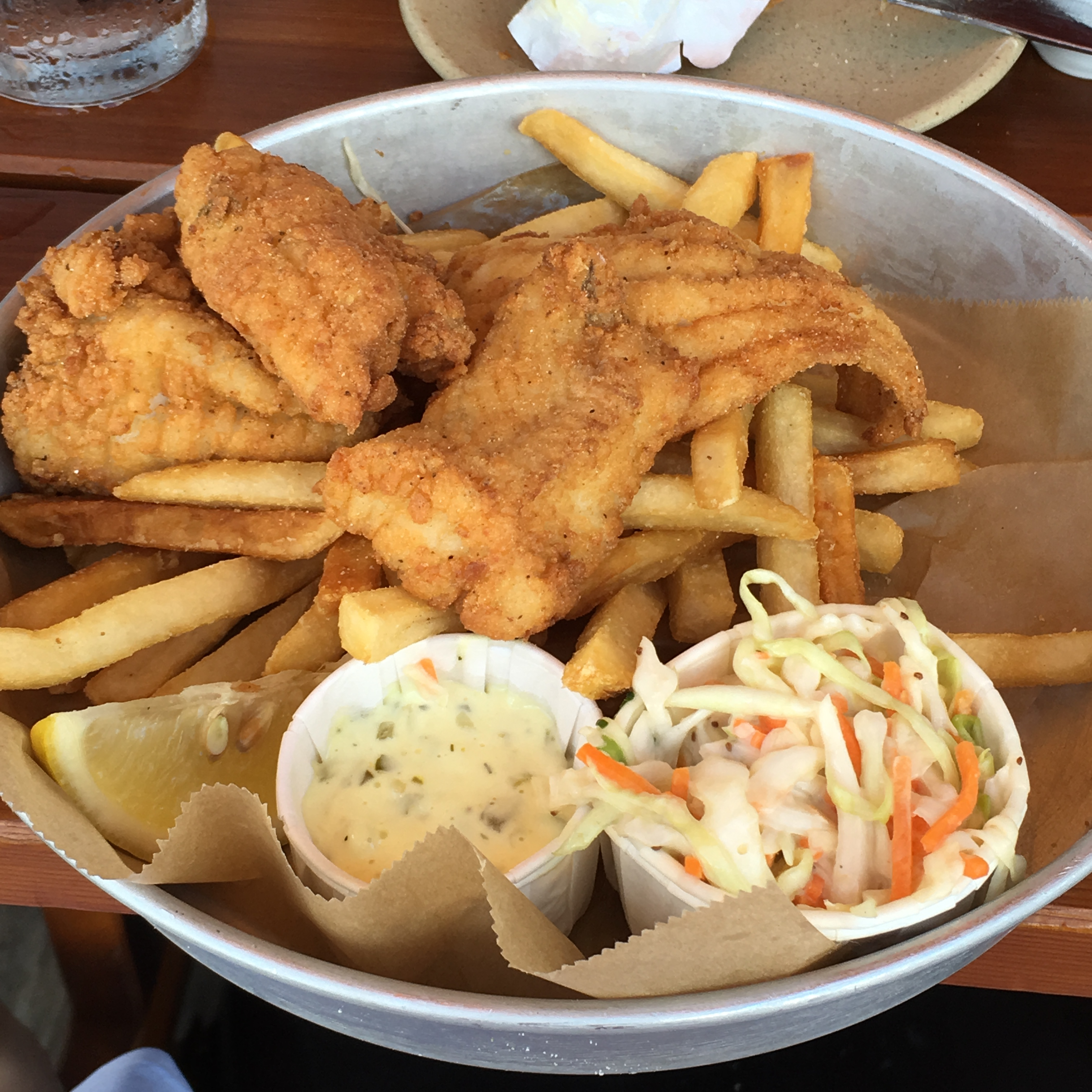
Fish and chips served with a lemon wedge, coleslaw and tartar sauce in an iron bowl

In chip shops in most parts of Britain and Ireland, salt and vinegar are traditionally sprinkled over fish and chips at the time it is served. Suppliers use malt vinegar, onion vinegar (used for pickling onions), or the cheaper non-brewed condiment. In a few places, notably Edinburgh, 'sauce' (as in 'salt and sauce') is more traditional than vinegar—with 'sauce' meaning a brown sauce. In England, curry sauce, gravy, mushy peas, beans and tartar sauce are popular side dishes, as are a range of pickles that typically include gherkins, onions and eggs. In table-service restaurants and pubs, the dish is usually served with a slice of lemon for squeezing over the fish, with salt, vinegar and sauces also available. Ketchup is also a popular addition (a 2020 YouGov poll in the UK saw ketchup, curry sauce and mushy peas as the top three toppings on chips after salt and vinegar).

In Ireland, Wales and England, many takeaways serve warm side portions of sauces such as curry sauce or gravy, if requested and normally for a small extra fee (curry sauce topped the poll in Wales with one in three using it as a topping). The sauces are usually poured over the chips. In the Midlands especially, chips with mushy peas or baked beans are known as a "pea mix" or a "bean mix". Other fried products include 'scraps' (also known as 'bits' in Southern England and "scrumps" in South Wales), originally a by-product of fish frying. Still popular in Northern England, they were given as treats to the children of customers. Portions prepared and sold today consist of loose blobs of batter, deep-fried to a crunchy golden crisp in the cooking fat. The potato scallop or potato cake consists of slices of potato dipped in fish batter and deep-fried until golden brown. These are often accompanied for dipping by the warm sauces listed above.

In Sheffield, Yorkshire fishcakes are made by sandwiching a piece of fish between two slices of potato and deep frying it in batter. This is commonly sold in a bread bun and known as a Fishcake Butty.

=== Nutrition information ===
An average serving of fish and chips consisting of 170 grams (6 oz) of fried fish with 280 grams (10 oz) of fried chips has approximately 1,000 kcal (4,200 kJ) calories and contains approximately 52 grams (1 4/5 oz) of fat.

== Vendors ==
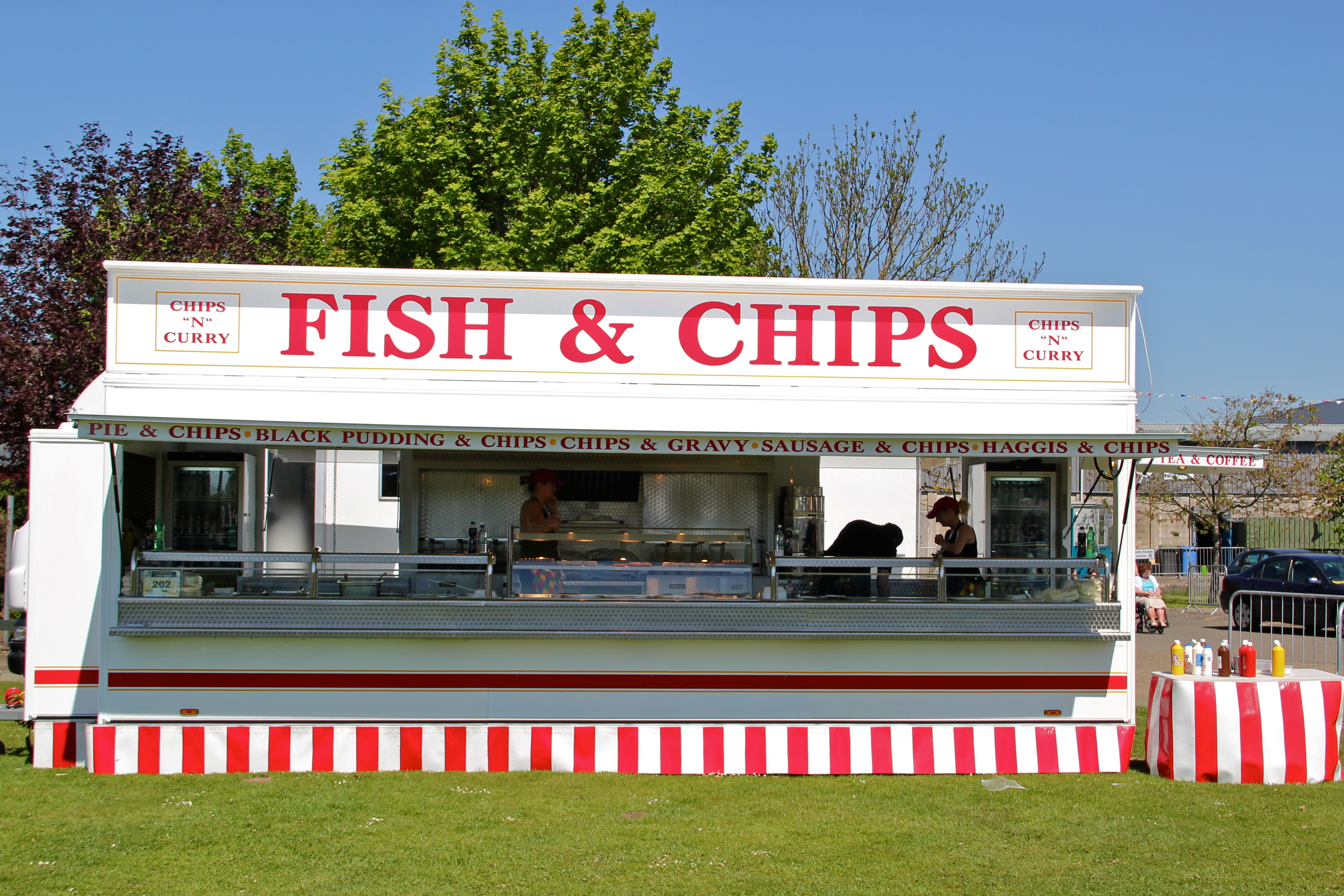
A mobile fish and chip vendor

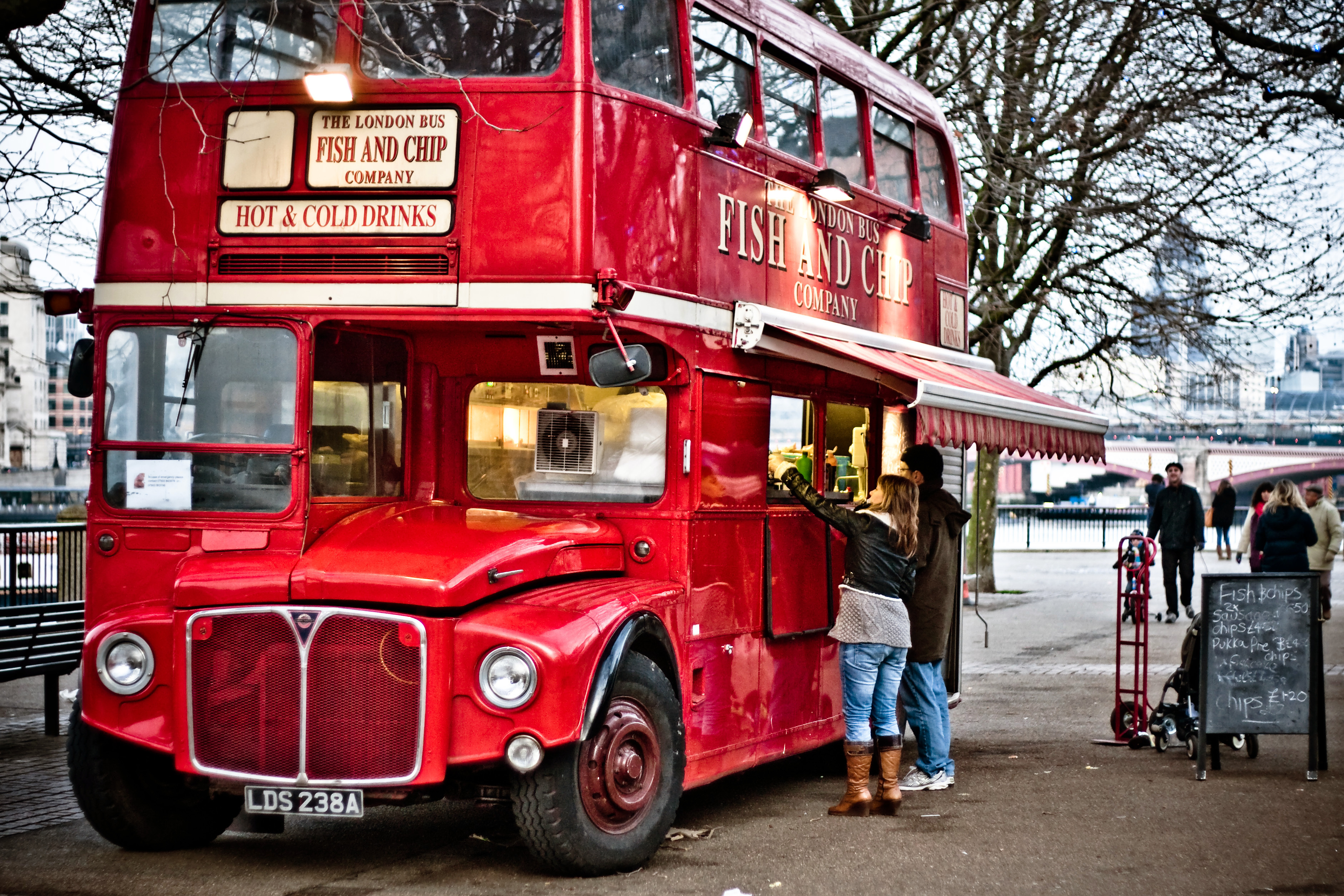
AEC Routemaster (classic London double-decker bus) converted into a mobile "chip van". Conventional vans are often used to sell fish and chips.

In the United Kingdom, Ireland, Australia, Canada, New Zealand and South Africa, fish and chips are usually sold by independent restaurants and take-aways known as fish and chip shops. Outlets range from small affairs to chain restaurants. Locally owned seafood restaurants are also popular in many places, as are mobile "chip vans". In Canada, the outlets may be referred to as "chip wagons".

In Ireland, the majority of traditional vendors are migrants or the descendants of migrants from southern Italy. A trade organisation exists to represent this tradition. In New Zealand and Australia, fish-and-chip vendors are a popular business and source of income among the Asian community, particularly Chinese migrants. In Indonesia, fish and chips are commonly found in western and seafood restaurants in large cities, as well as chain restaurants like The Manhattan Fish Market, Fish & Chips, etc.

Many British establishments have humorous or pun-based names, such as "The Codfather", "The Frying Scotsman", and "Jack the Chipper". The numerous competitions and awards for "best fish-and-chip shop" testify to the recognised status of this type of outlet in popular culture.

Fish and chips is a popular lunch meal eaten by families travelling to seaside resorts for day trips who do not bring their own picnic meals.

Fish-and-chip outlets sell roughly 25% of all the white fish consumed in the United Kingdom, and 10% of all potatoes.

Fish-and-chip shops traditionally wrapped their product in newspaper, or with an inner layer of white paper (for hygiene) and an outer layer of newspaper or blank newsprint (for insulation and to absorb grease), though the use of newspaper for wrapping has almost ceased on grounds of hygiene. Nowadays, establishments usually use food-quality wrapping paper, or recyclable cardboard boxes.

The British National Federation of Fish Friers was founded in 1913. It promotes fish and chips and offers training courses. It has about 8,500 members from around the UK.

A previous world record for the "largest serving of fish and chips" was held by Gadaleto's Seafood Market in New Paltz, New York. This 2004 record was broken by Yorkshire pub Wensleydale Heifer in July 2011. An attempt to break this record was made by Doncaster fish and chip shop Scawsby Fisheries in August 2012, which served 15 kg (33 lb) of battered cod alongside 29 kg (64 lb) of chips. Current record is held by Resorts World Birmingham which served a fish and chips weighing 54.99 kg (121 lb 4 oz) from a 27.83-kilogram (61 lb 6 oz) raw filet of halibut on 9 February 2018.

== Cultural impact ==
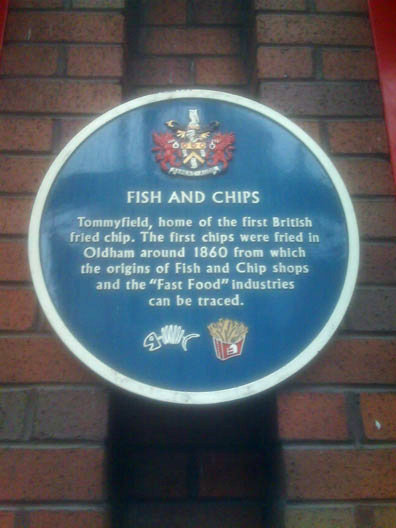
Blue plaque in Oldham, England marking the 1860s origins of fish and chip shops and the fast food industry.

The long-standing Roman Catholic tradition of not eating meat on Fridays, especially during Lent, and of substituting fish for meat on that day continues to influence habits even in predominantly Protestant, semi-secular and secular societies. Friday night remains a traditional occasion for eating fish and chips; many cafeterias and similar establishments, while varying their menus on other days of the week, habitually offer fish and chips every Friday.

In 1967, inspired by the use of salt and vinegar as condiments for fish and chips in the UK, the Smiths Potato Crisps Company created Salt & Vinegar flavour crisps.

In Australia and New Zealand, the words "fish and chips" are often used as a shibboleth to highlight the difference in each country's short-i vowel sound /ɪ/. Australian English has a higher forward sound [i], close to the ee in see (but shorter), while New Zealand English has a lower backward sound [ɘ] akin to the a in Rosa's (but not in Rosa, which is typically lower [ɐ]). Thus, New Zealanders hear Australians say "feesh and cheeps," while Australians hear New Zealanders say "fush and chups."

== Environment ==
In the UK, waste oil from fish and chip shops has become a useful source of biodiesel. The German biodiesel company Petrotec has announced plans to produce biodiesel in the UK using waste oil from the British fish-and-chip industry.

== See also ==
- Fried potatoes – Fried or deep-fried slices of potatoes
- Kibbeling – Dutch seafood snack, consisting of chunks of deep-fried cod
- Lekkerbekje – Dutch batter-fried fish
- List of deep-fried foods
- List of fish and chip restaurants
- List of fish dishes
- Moules-frites – Dish of mussels and fries
- Scampi – Seafood dish and style of preparation

== Bibliography ==
- Priestland, Gerald (1972). Frying tonight: the saga of fish & chips. London: Gentry Books. ISBN 0-85614-014-7.
- Walton, John K. (1989). "Fish and Chips and the British Working Class, 1870–1930". Journal of Social History. 23 (2): 243–266. doi:10.1353/jsh/23.2.243. JSTOR 3787879.
- Walton, John K. (1994). Fish and Chips, and the British Working Class, 1870–1940 (1 ed.). Leicester: Leicester University Press. ISBN 0-567-21232-7.
