= Pescadito =

Traditional Mexican dish

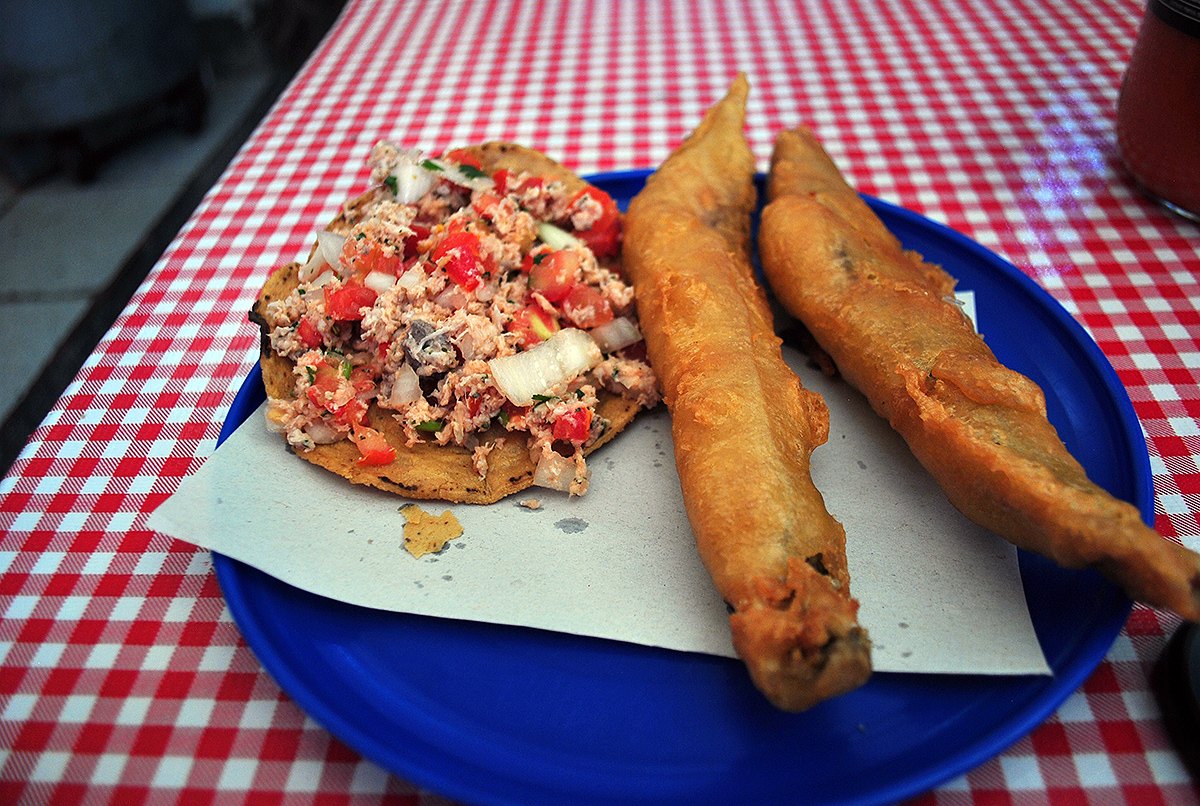
Tostada and pescadito rebozado

Pescadito is a type of food in Mexico, with similar counterparts in other parts of the world, consisting of a strip of battered fish meat. The preparation for the batter consists of wheat flour, salt, egg, corn starch and water. The strip is immersed in it and is introduced in hot oil. It is served with lemon and hot sauce.

== See also ==
- Pescaíto frito, Spain
- Fish and chips, UK
