= Fried fish =

Any fish or shellfish that has been prepared by frying

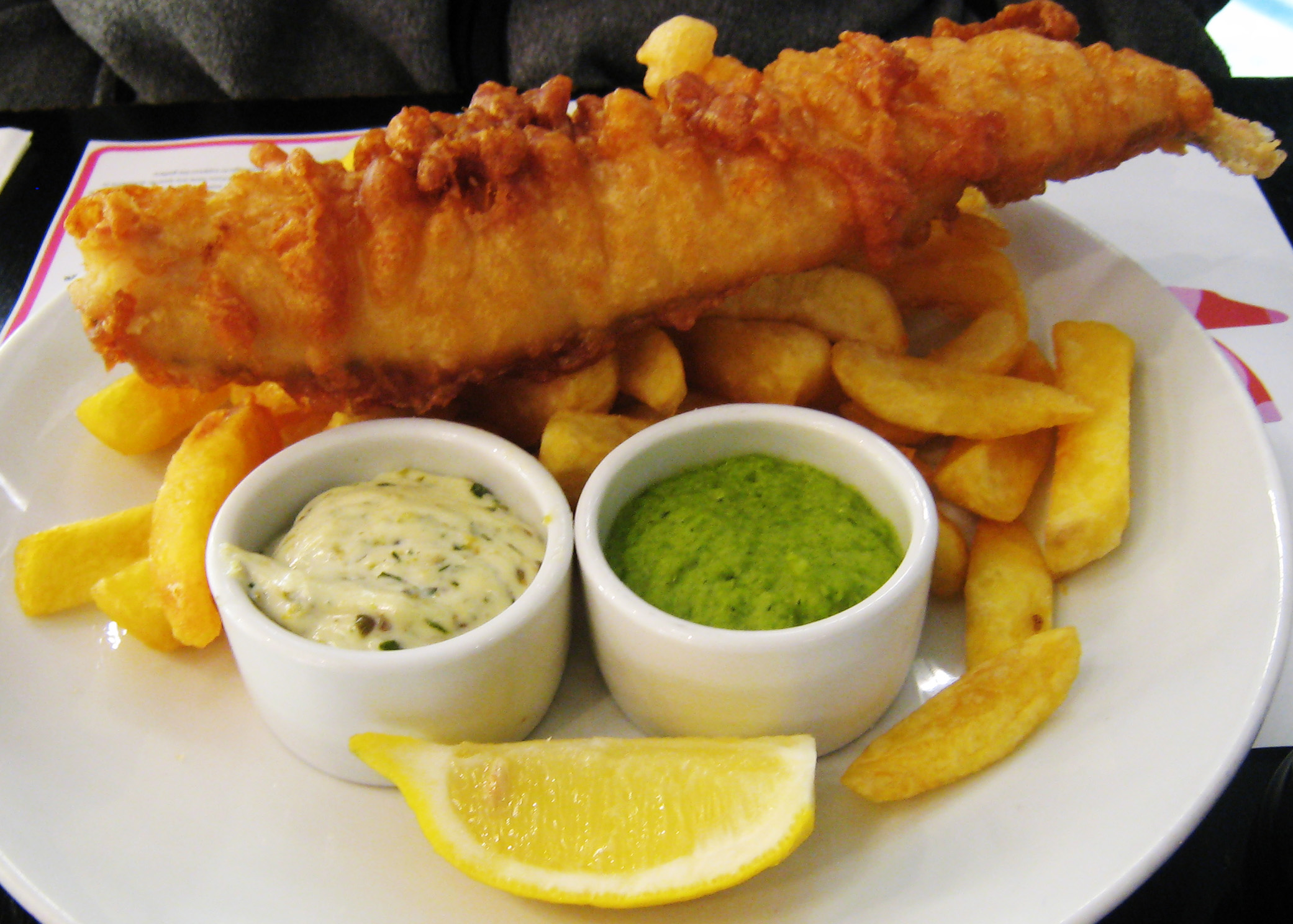
Fried fish and chips with lemon, ketchup, tartar sauce and mushy peas, as served in London

Fried fish is any fish or shellfish that has been prepared by frying. Often, the fish is covered in batter, egg and breadcrumbs, flour, or herbs and spices before being fried and served, often with a slice of lemon.

Fish is fried in many parts of the world, and fried fish is an important food in many cuisines. For many cultures, fried fish is historically derived from pescado frito, and the traditional fish and chips dish of England which it may have inspired. The latter remains a staple take-out dish of the UK and its former and present colonies. Fried fishcakes made of cod (and other white fish, such as haddock, halibut or whiting) are widely available in the frozen food sections of U.S. grocery stores. Long John Silver's, Skippers, Captain D's, and Arthur Treacher's are well-known North American chain restaurants that serve fried fish as their main food offering. Catfish are also a prevalent farm-raised type of fish that is often served fried throughout the world. A classic fried fish recipe from France is sole meunière.

== Fish fries ==
Community fish fries are popular in the southern region of the United States. These social gatherings may center around a church, a civic organization or serve as a fundraiser for a club, volunteer fire department, a school or other organization. In the U.S., especially the Upper Midwest, the New England states, and the Mid-Atlantic states, community fish fries are somewhat popular, sometimes held in church basements or lots in observation of Lent. A fish fry is generally informal. A "shore lunch" is a tradition in the northern U.S. and Canada, where outdoor enthusiasts cook their catch on the shores of the ocean, or lake where the fish was caught.

== Health effects ==
Fried fish is associated with an increased risk of cardiovascular disease. The American Food and Drug Administration and British National Health Service have suggested that broiled or steamed fish is a healthier option than frying.

Frying fish results in higher losses of docosahexaenoic acid (DHA) and eicosapentaenoic acid (EPA) compared to other cooking methods.

== Fried fish dishes ==
Name	Image	Description
Kani cream croquette		Kani cream croquette, or Kani cream korokke, a Japanese take on the French croquette, consists of a creamy filling of crabmeat and béchamel sauce, coated in panko breadcrumbs and deep-fried, often made with imitation crab meat.
Fish and chips		Battered fish which is deep-fried and served with chips. A popular take-away food in the United Kingdom, Ireland, Australia, New Zealand, Canada and South Africa.
Fishcake		A fishcake or fish cake consists of filleted fish and potato, sometimes coated in breadcrumbs or batter, and fried. They are similar to croquettes, and are often served in British fish and chip shops.
Fish finger		A processed food made using a whitefish, such as cod, haddock or pollock, which has been battered or breaded. They are known as fish sticks in North America.
Fish fry		Contains battered or breaded fried fish. It is usually accompanied with french fries, coleslaw, hushpuppies, lemon slices, tartar sauce, and malt vinegar.
Fried prawn		Popular in Japan where it also used as a component in bento.
Fried shrimp		Batter-coated and deep-fried shrimp, usually cooked in vegetable oil
Fried rui		Fried rui served in Dhaka, Bangladesh.
Fried stuffed fish (pomfret)		Fried stuffed/recheado pomfret served in Goa, India. The stuffed spicy combination paste/masala is a mixture of green/verde (cilantro/green chillies) or red/vermelho (dried red chillies). Traditionally fried in coconut oil. Served in Goa and Portugal. An alternative is to stuff smaller fish such as mackerel with longitudinally sliced fresh green chillies (jalapeño or serrano).
Fried walleye		Fried walleye is a common dish in Minnesotan cuisine and Canadian cuisine. Often either battered or breaded and deep fried, or placed on a sandwich
Lekkerbekje		Dutch fish fried in batter, often served with fried potatoes
Ikan goreng		An Indonesia and Malaysian dish of seasoned and deep-fried fish. Usually served with sambal chili paste or kecap manis (sweet soy sauce). Popular fish used include gourami, carp, milkfish, and red snapper.
Machh bhaja		Machh bhaja is fish fried in mustard oil. It is a traditional Bengali and Oriya dish often eaten along with rice and other dishes. "Machh" means "fish" and "bhaja" means "fry" in Bengali/Oriya.
Pescado frito		An Andalusian dish, made by coating the fish (blue or white fish) in flour and deep-frying in olive oil. The fish is then sprinkled with salt as the only seasoning. Spanish Jews brought the recipe to England during the 17th Century, helping the eventual development of fish and chips.
Satsuma age		Satsuma age (薩摩揚げ) is a deep-fried fishcake from Kagoshima, Japan. Surimi and flour are mixed to make a compact paste that is solidified through frying. It is a specialty of the Satsuma region. It is known as chikiagi in Okinawa.
Tempura		Japanese dish of seafood or vegetables that have been battered and deep-fried.
Whitebait fritter		Whitebait is a collective term for the small fry of fish. These are tender and edible, and can be regarded as a delicacy. The entire fish is eaten including head, fins and gut. Some species are more desired than others, and the particular species marketed as "whitebait" varies in different parts of the world. In New Zealand, whitebait fritters are popular. Whitebait is combined with eggs or egg white, and cooked as an omelette is cooked.

== See also ==
- List of fish dishes
