= NFFF =

NFFF may refer to:

- National Fantasy Fan Federation, science fiction fan organization founded in 1941
- National Federation of Fish Friers, British trade association
- National Fallen Firefighters Foundation, American organization
