= Giuseppe Cervi =

Italian fryer

- Born: 11 March 1860; Picinisco, Frosinone Italy
- Died: 3 January 1927 (aged 66); Dublin, Ireland
- Resting place: Glasnevin Cemetery
- Known for: Introducing the Fish and Chip cuisine to Ireland
- Children: 2

Giuseppe Cervi was an Italian fryer, best known for bringing the fish and chip cuisine to Ireland and opening the first chipper in the country.

== Early life ==
Cervi was born on March 11, 1860, in Picinisco to Lorenzo Cervi and Angela Margiotta. Cervi ended up in Ireland by mistake. He accidentally got off a boat that was headed to America at the final stop at Queenstown now called Cobh.

== Career ==
When Cervi reached Dublin he began work as a labourer until he could afford to buy a coal-fired cooker which he used to sell chips outside of various pubs. Cervi opened the first chipper in Ireland at 22 Great Brunswick Street now the location of the Dublin Fire Brigade headquarters. The chipper was named simply Giuseppe Cervi.

Cervi died on January 3, 1927, at the age of 67. He was interred in Glasnevin Cemetery.
