= Lekkerbekje =

Dutch batter-fried fish

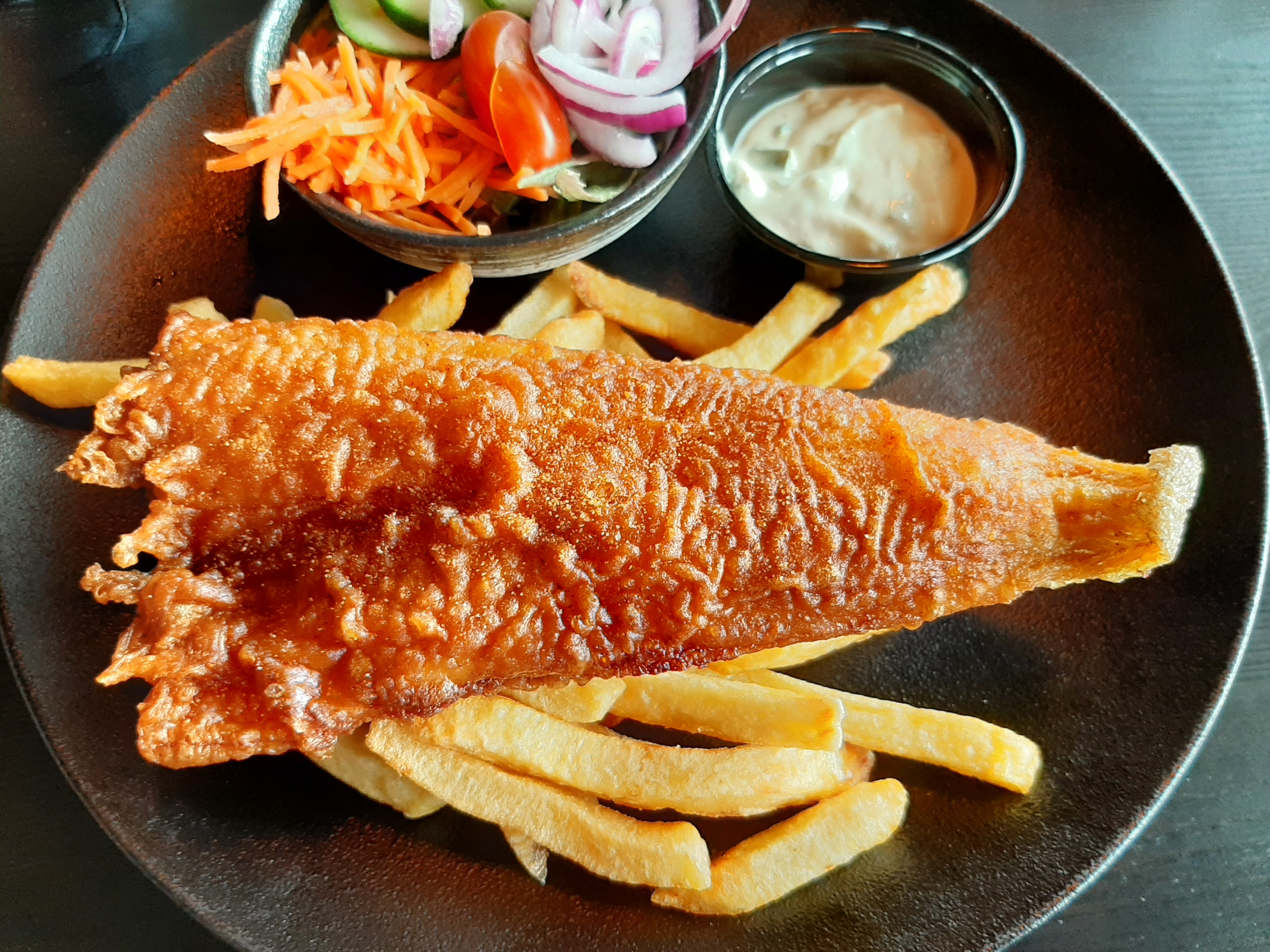
Lekkerbekje with fries, salad and tartar sauce

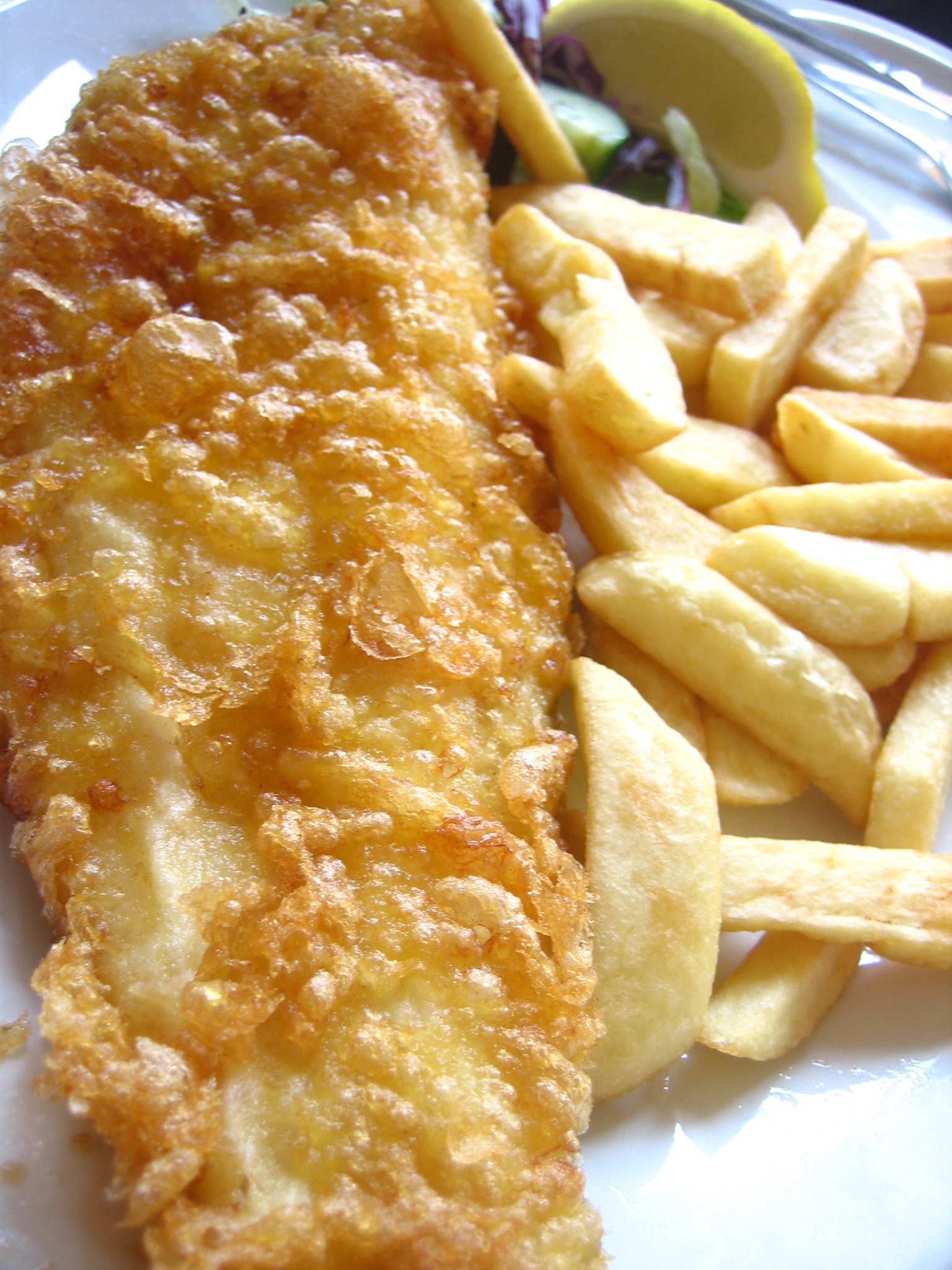
Lekkerbekje and fries

Lekkerbekje is a Dutch fried fish dish. It consists of a fish fried in batter and deep fried. It is sometimes called the Dutch version of fish and chips, though it is not always served with chips.

The name "lekkerbekje" is a diminutive of lekkerbek meaning gourmand.

Lekkerbekje may have originated in the town of IJmuiden, although this is uncertain. Originally lekkerbekje only used whiting, however now it includes a variety of white fish such as cod, pangasius and pollock.

Lekkerbekje is often served with tartar sauce.

== See also ==
- Kibbeling
- Fish and chips
