= Walleye sandwich =

Fried fish sandwich

- Type: sandwich
- Course: Main course
- Place of origin: Minnesota, US
- Serving temperature: Hot
- Main ingredients: breaded and fried walleye

The walleye sandwich is an important part of Minnesotan and Canadian cuisine. It consists of a fried walleye fillet, on a burger bun or hard roll, it can also include lettuce, tomato, red onions, mayonnaise or tartar sauce. The sandwich originated in Minnesota, but is now popular throughout the Upper Midwest and Eastern Canada. Walleye sandwiches are offered across the state of Minnesota.

== Cultural significance ==
The walleye is considered a cultural food in both Canada and Minnesota, and is considered one of the most popular sandwiches in Minnesota and is often consumed for Lent. Additionally, the sandwich is found on 29% of menus within Minnesota.

The sandwich is even offered at Culver's.
