= Machh bhaja =

Machh baja is a crispy, spice-marinated deep-fried fish dish

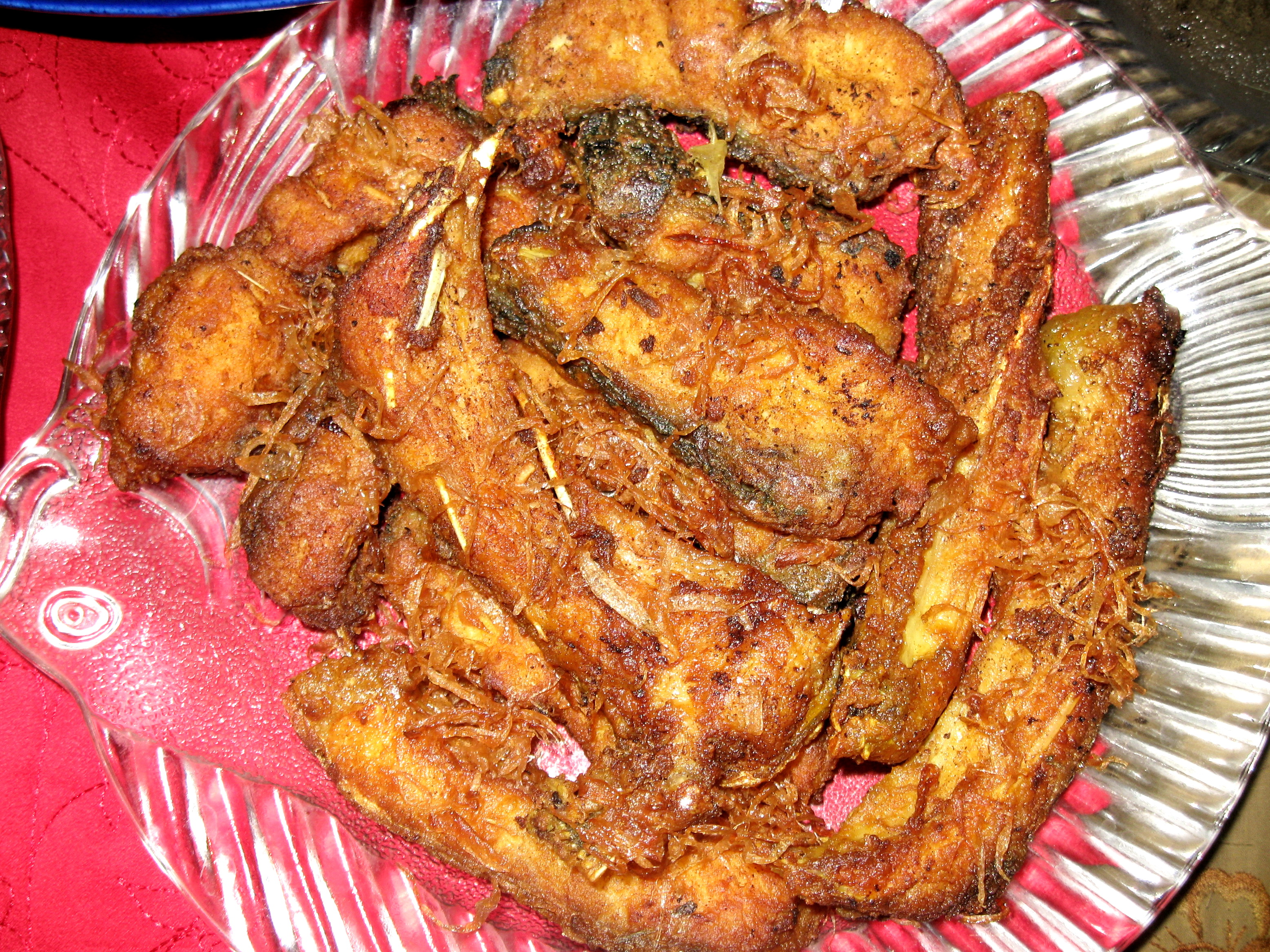
- Fried Rohu served in Dhaka, Bangladesh

In West Bengal, Odisha, Assam and Bangladesh, fried fish or māchh bhājā is a common delicacy. Riverine fish like bhetki, topshey, aarh and pābdā (Ompok pābdā), and anadromous fish such as hilsa are commonly fried in Bengali cuisine, Odia cuisine and Assamese cuisine.

In the process of frying it in oil, a hilsa will release additional oil. The oil mixture is valued as a flavouring agent for rice or vegetables.
