= National Federation of Fish Friers =

British trade association

- Abbreviation: NFFF
- Formation: 1913
- Legal status: Non-profit organisation
- Purpose: Fish and chip shops in the UK
- Location: 4 Greenwood Mount, Meanwood, Leeds, England
- Region served: UK
- Members: 10,500 fish and chip shops
- NFFF President: Andrew Crook
- Main organ: NFFF Board of Directors
- Affiliations: Seafish
- Website: nfff.co.uk

The National Federation of Fish Friers (NFFF) is a British trade association for the fish and chips trade.

== Structure ==
Its headquarters are in Leeds, West Yorkshire. Standard membership for one shop is, as of 2026, £215 a year. It has 12 regions.

== History ==
It was founded in 1913 and has about 8,500 members.

== Function ==
It runs training courses and speaks for the trade. It runs the Customer Service Skills and Fish Frying Skills qualifications for the Seafish authority.

=== Awards ===
It runs the Young Fish Frier of the Year Award.

=== Publications ===
Its monthly magazine The Fish Friers Review (no apostrophe) was founded as The National Fish Caterers’ Review in 1925.

== See also ==
- List of fish and chip restaurants
- Seafish
- British Potato Council
