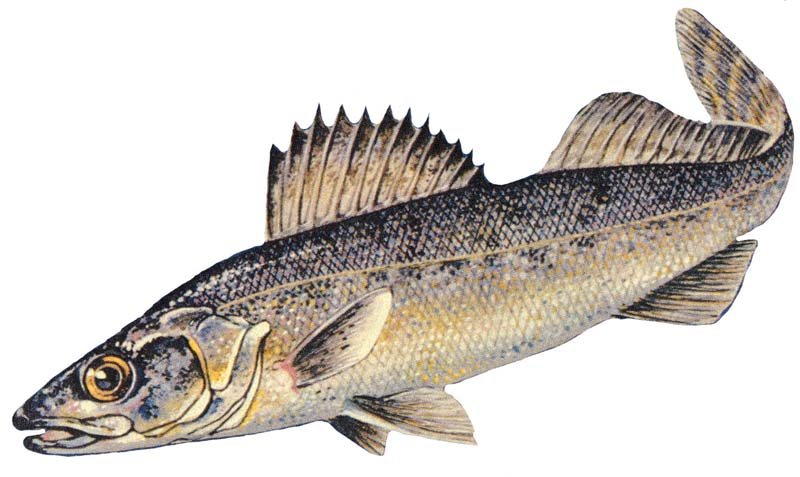

Conservation status
- Extinct (1983)

Scientific classification (invalid taxon)
- Kingdom: Animalia
- Phylum: Chordata
- Class: Actinopterygii
- Division: Teleostei
- Order: Perciformes
- Family: Percidae
- Subfamily: Luciopercinae
- Genus: Sander
- Species: S. vitreus
- Subspecies: †S. v. glaucus

Trinomial name
- †Sander vitreus glaucus (Hubbs, 1926)

Synonyms
- Stizostedion glaucum Hubbs, 1926; Stizostedion vitreum glaucum Trautman, 1981; Sander glaucus Hubbs, 1926

= Blue walleye =

Extinct variety of fish

The blue walleye (Sander vitreus var. glaucus), also called the blue pike, was a unique color morph (formerly considered a subspecies) of walleye which was endemic to the Great Lakes of North America. Morphometric studies led biologists to classify the blue walleye as a separate species in 1926, although it was later downgraded to a subspecies. Listed as an endangered species by the United States in 1967, it was declared extinct in 1983.

Genetic analyses conducted in the 21st century show that the blue walleye was not genetically different from the yellow walleye (Sander vitreus), rendering the taxon invalid.

== Species controversy ==
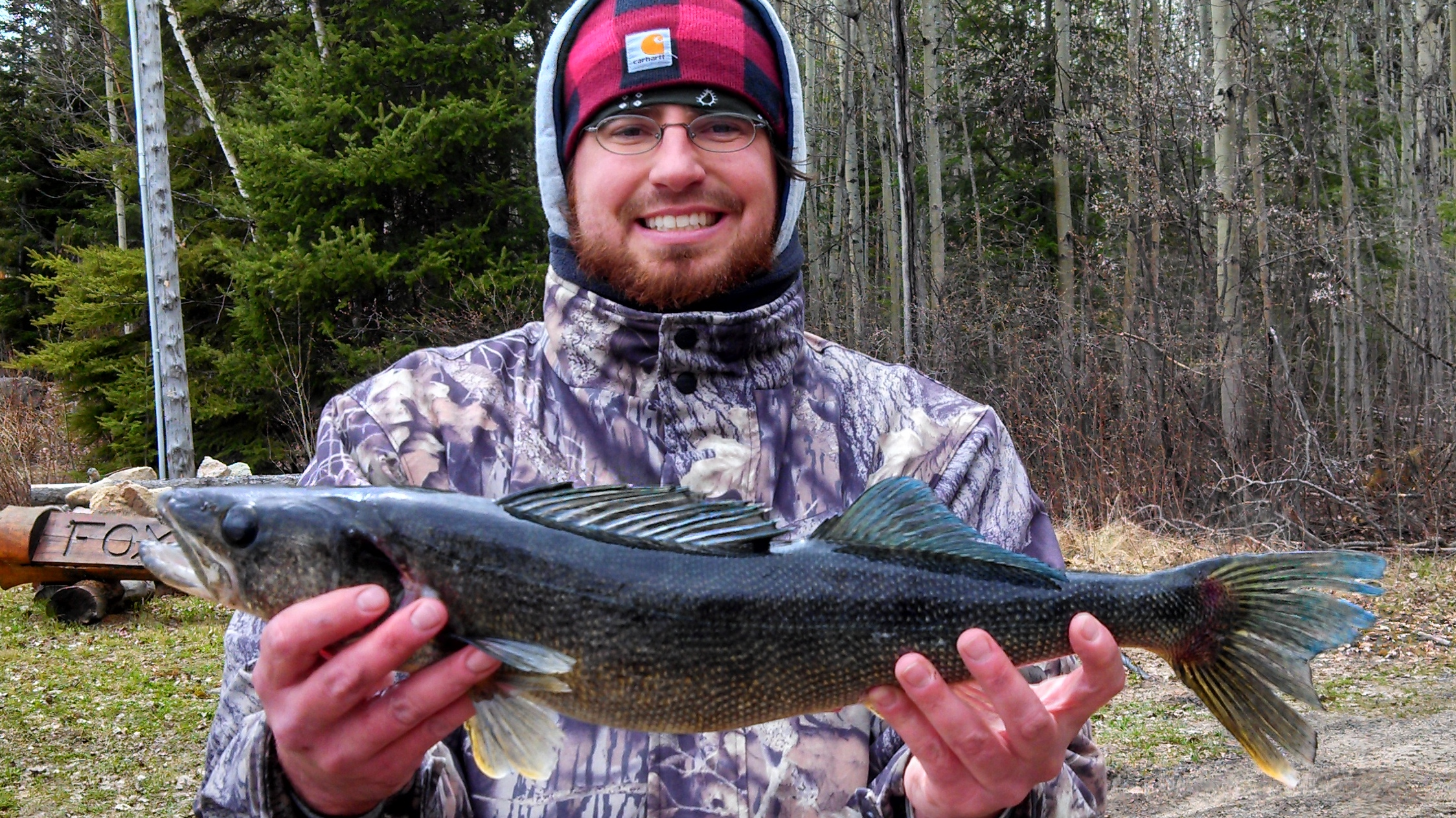
Blue color variant of the yellow walleye

The blue walleye was long considered to be different from the yellow walleye. Based on morphological study, Carl Leavitt Hubbs declared the blue walleye to be a separate species in 1926. The species was later downgraded to a subspecies.

The blue walleye was a commercially valuable fish in the Great Lakes. Populations appeared to collapse quickly in the 1950s. Between 1950 and 1957, catches in the U.S. and Canada fluctuated between 2,000,000 pounds (910,000 kg) and 26,000,000 pounds (12,000,000 kg) a year. In 1959, however, just 79,000 pounds (36,000 kg) were caught, and in 1964 only 200 pounds (91 kg). The United States declared blue walleye an endangered species in 1967, and extinct in 1983.

A 2014 genetic study of 1,181 preserved "historic" walleye (70 to 90 years old), blue walleye/blue pike, and modern walleye found no evidence for concluding that blue walleye/blue pike were genetically distinct from other walleye. This rendered the taxon invalid.

Occasionally, grey-blue or steel-blue walleye are caught in Lake Erie, Lake Ontario, and the Ohio River drainage. Dark blue yellow perch are also sometimes caught in the same areas.

A turquoise-colored walleye exists in some waters of the Canadian Shield. A mucosal pigment, named "sandercyanin", was hypothesized to be the source of the color, but this has not been confirmed. This fish was also thought to be a separate subspecies of walleye, but genetic testing showed there is no difference between the turquoise walleye and yellow walleye.

== Description ==
Sander vitreus "glaucus" also known as the "blue pike" is endemic to Lakes Erie and Ontario and co-occurred with Sander vitreus vitreus. It is compared to the walleye in many aspects however, the "blue pike" inhabits the deeper and cooler areas of Lake Erie but was also seen in shallow and warmer areas alongside the walleye. In comparison to the walleye the "blue pike" has a steel blue color, larger eyes placed bit higher than the walleyes eye placement, and the eye distance is smaller as well.
