= Edward De Gernier =

Belgian fryer & shoemaker

- Born: 18 May 1847; Molenbeek-Saint-Jean, Brussels, Belgium
- Died: 3 March 1926 (aged 78); Dundee, Scotland
- Other name: Frenchie
- Known for: Introducing chips to Scotland
- Spouse: Julia Stephanie Morant

Edward De Gernier was a Belgian fryer and shoemaker, best known for introducing chips to Scotland.

== Early life ==
De Gernier was born in Brussels in 1847. In April 1869, he married Julia Stephanie Morant of Armentières, France. They moved to Scotland from Armentières eventually settling in Dundee.

== Career ==
After arriving in Dundee, De Gernier noticed a gap in the market for a Belgian-style chip stall. His wife's combination of chips and peas with vinegar, nicknamed the Dundee Buster, was a huge success with the locals. He set up a shop in the no longer existing Grassmarket area, which was famous for its street markets. De Gernier’s influence laid the foundation for Dundee’s long-standing relationship with the chippy, a meal that is still enjoyed today.

When Julia passed away in 1902, Edward retired from the chipper business and opened a shoe repair shop in Lochee, which he worked at until his death in 1926 at the age of 79.
