= Pescado frito =

Fried fish dish

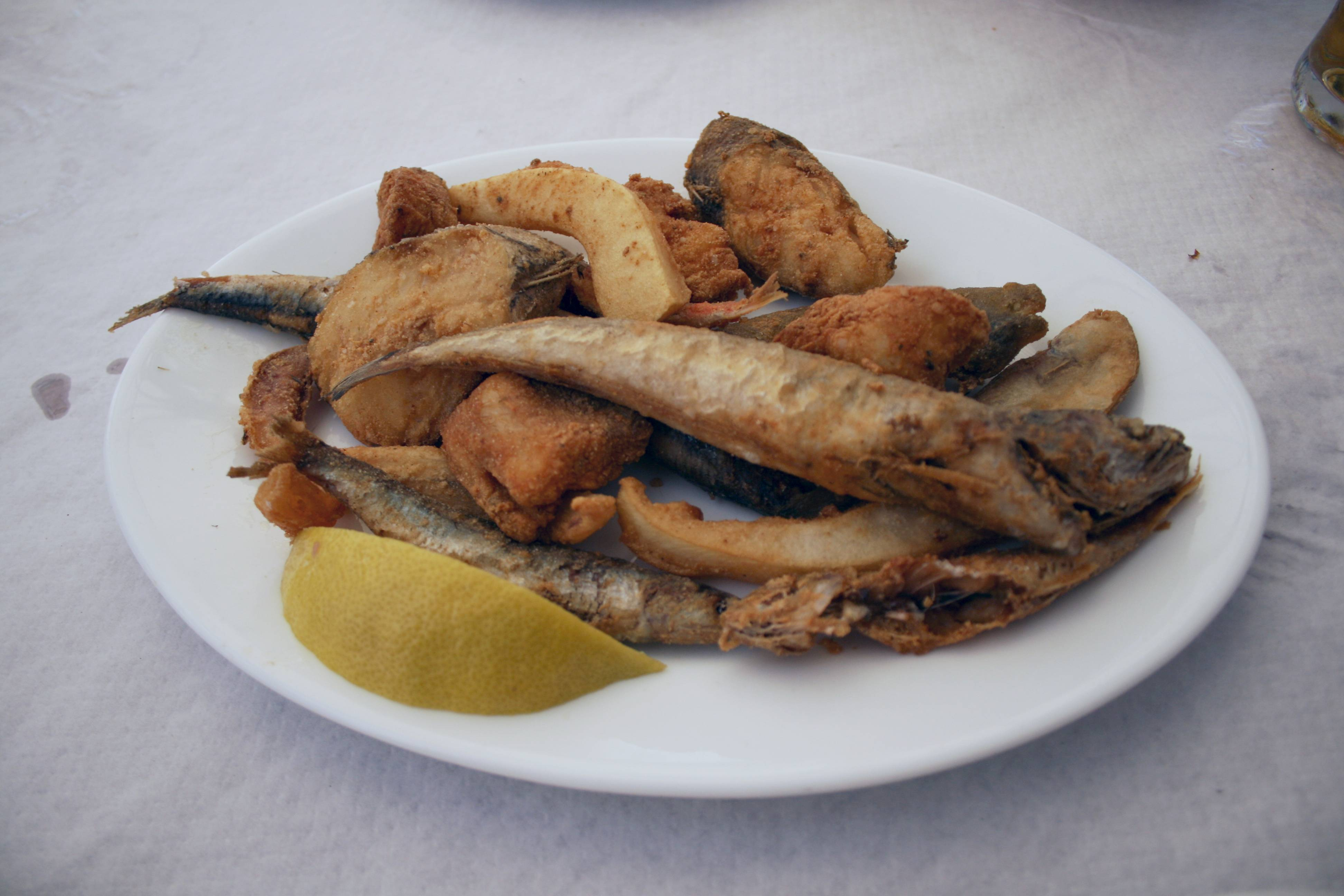
Pescado frito

Pescado frito (lit. 'fried fish' in Spanish), also called pescaíto frito (lit. 'fried little fish' in Andalusian dialect), is a traditional dish from the Southern coast of Spain, typically found in Andalusia, but also in Catalonia, Valencia, the Canary Islands and the Balearic Islands.

Pescado frito is also consumed in inland Spain, being very common in the inland Andalusian provinces of Seville and Córdoba. It is also very common throughout the Mediterranean Basin and is found in Provence and Roussillon, France and in the coastal regions of Italy (where the most common variant using salt cod fillets is known as filetto di baccalà) and Greece (where various fish like Mediterranean sand smelt, European anchovy, cod, common sole, greater amberjack and picarel are used). It was also eaten by the Romans in ancient Rome.

It is made by coating the fish (usually a white fish) in flour and deep-frying it in olive oil, then sprinkling it with salt as the only seasoning. It is usually served hot, freshly fried, and can be eaten as an appetizer (for example, with a beer or wine), or as the main course. Usually, it is served with fresh lemon, which is squeezed over the fish or occasionally in escabeche.

== Sephardic Jew ==
It was also a traditional Shabbat fish dish (usually cod) for the 16th century Andalusian Jews of Spain and Portugal. The deep-frying of the fish in vegetable oil makes it crisp and light even when eaten cold, and it is a favourite dish for the late breakfast or lunch after synagogue services on Saturday morning.

There is a general belief that pescado frito was possibly an inspiration for the English fish and chips, brought to England by Spanish Jews; Sephardim began to settle in England in small numbers after Oliver Cromwell lifted the formal ban in the 1650s. Thomas Jefferson described the traditional dish as 'fish in the Jewish fashion".

== See also ==
- Fish fry
- Fried fish
