= Tommyfield Market =

Retail markets in Oldham, Greater Manchester

Tommyfield Market is in Oldham. Its main claim to fame is that it is said to be the origin of the fish and chip shop in Britain, and there is a blue plaque to celebrate this disputed distinction.

There has been a market in the town centre since 1788. The first indoor market, called Victoria Market, was built in 1880, but it burnt down in 1974. The current Tommyfield Market was built in the 1990s.

Oldham Council are moving the market to the redeveloped The Spindles shopping centre in 2026. It will open on 28th March.

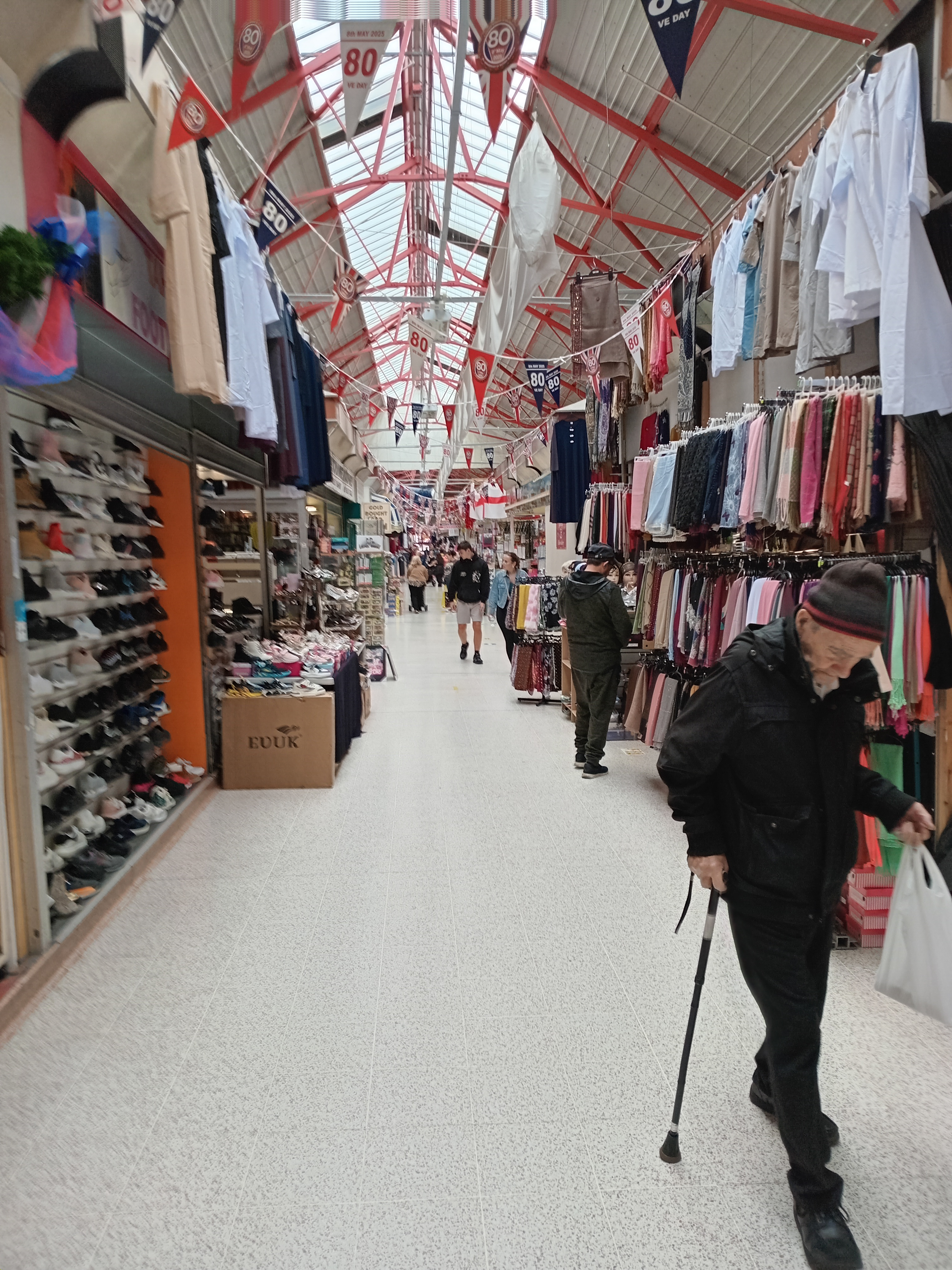
Broad view of the stalls

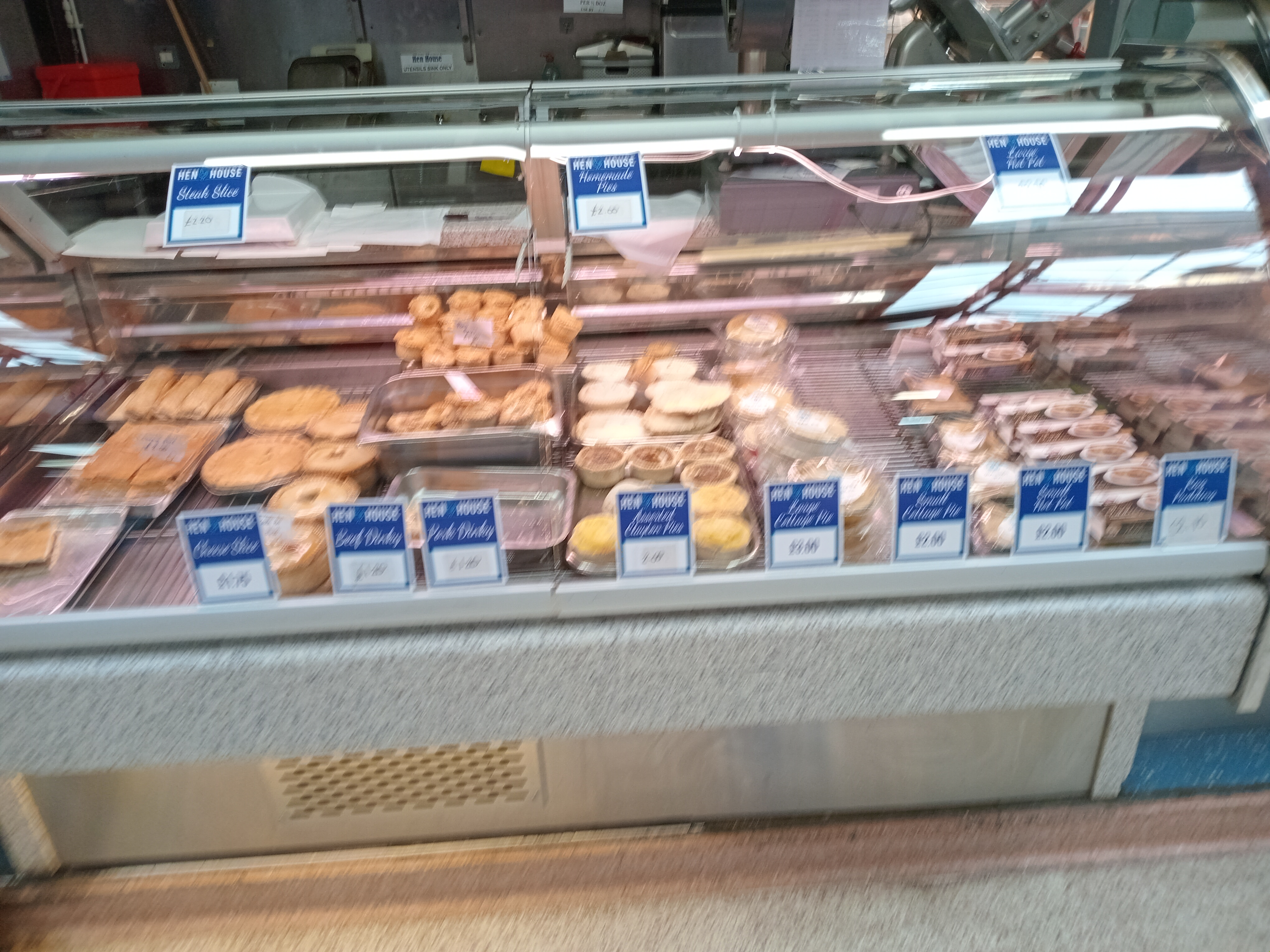
counter of a meat stall

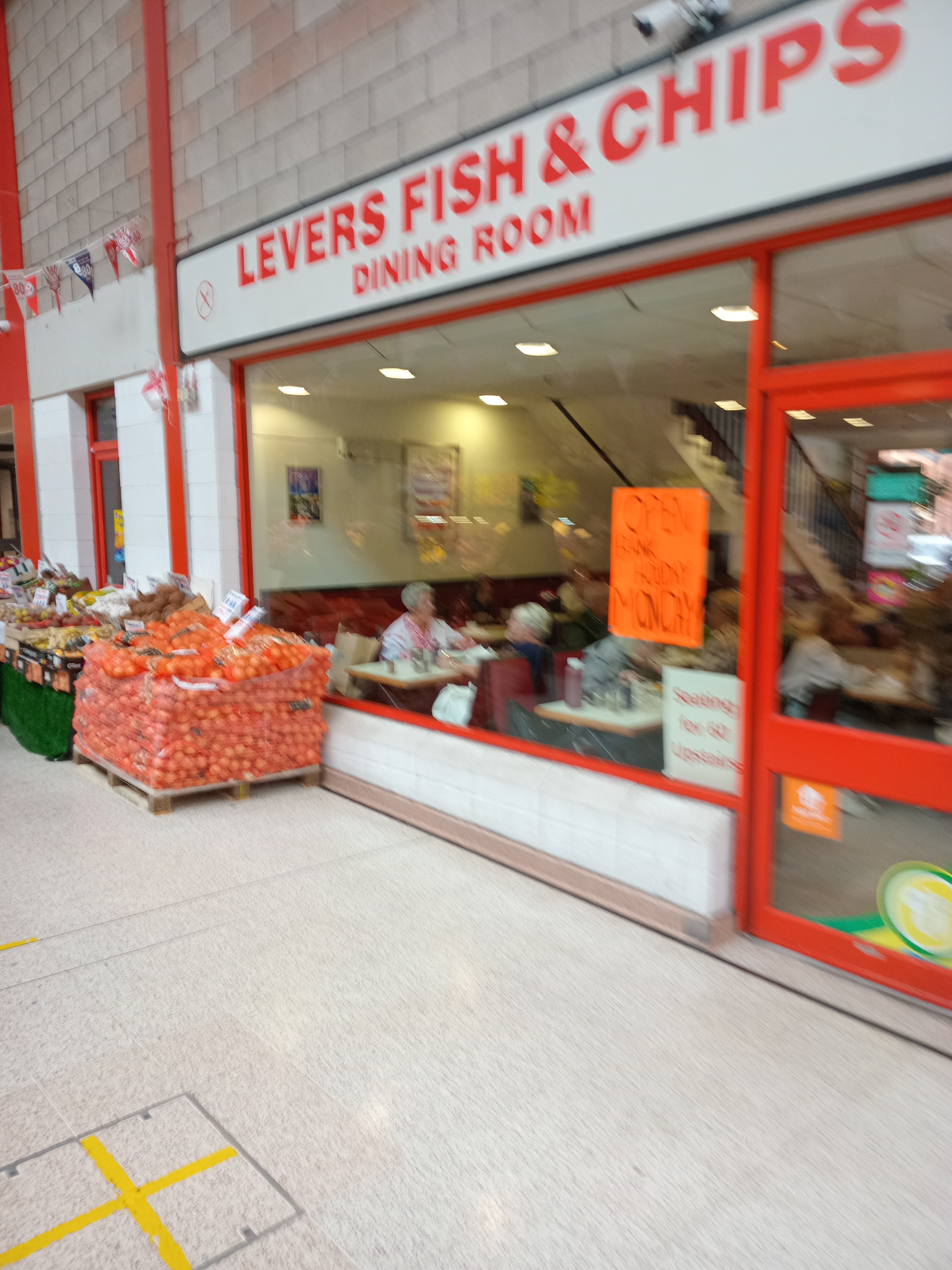
Fish and chip shop

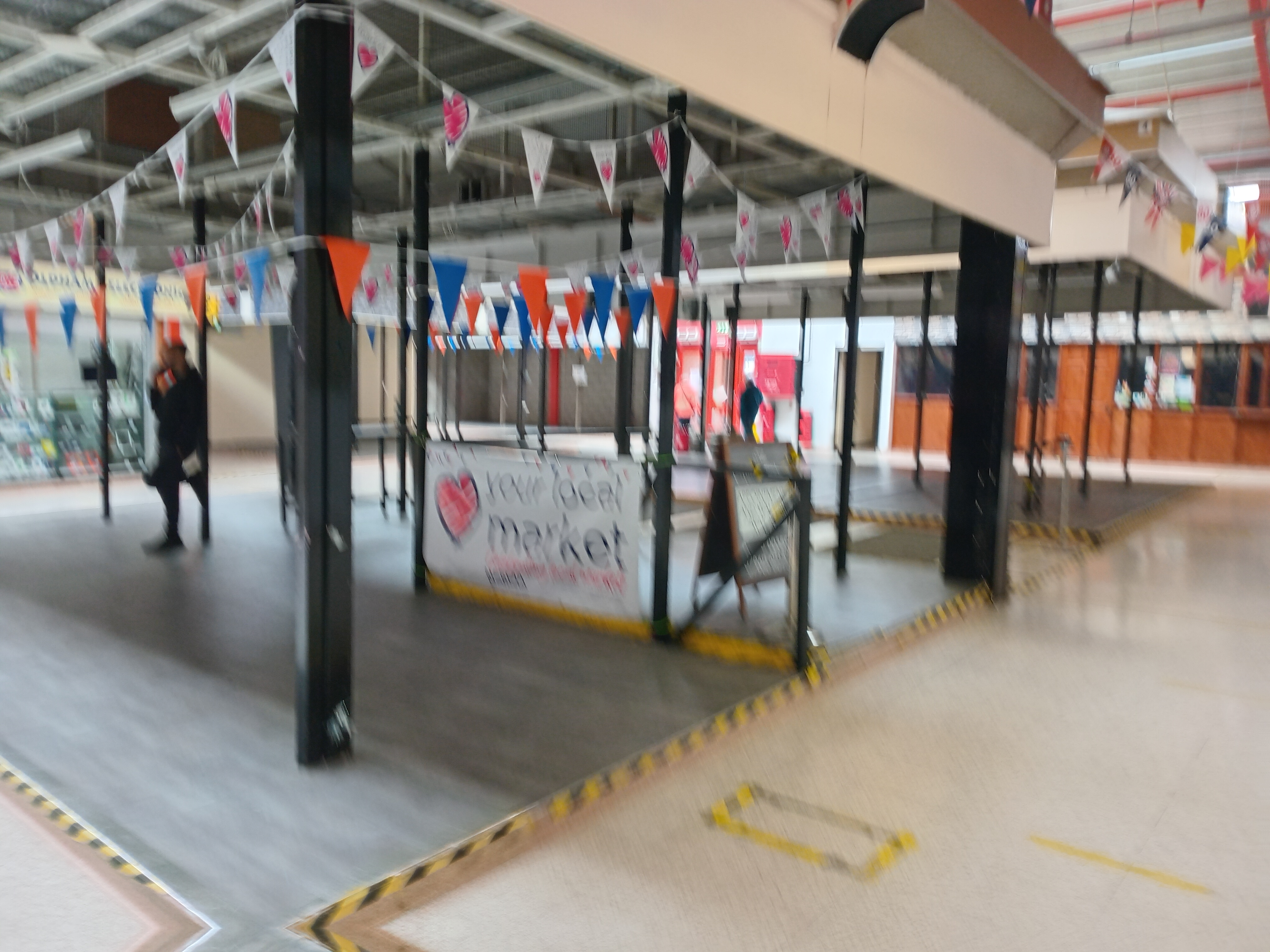
Empty stalls

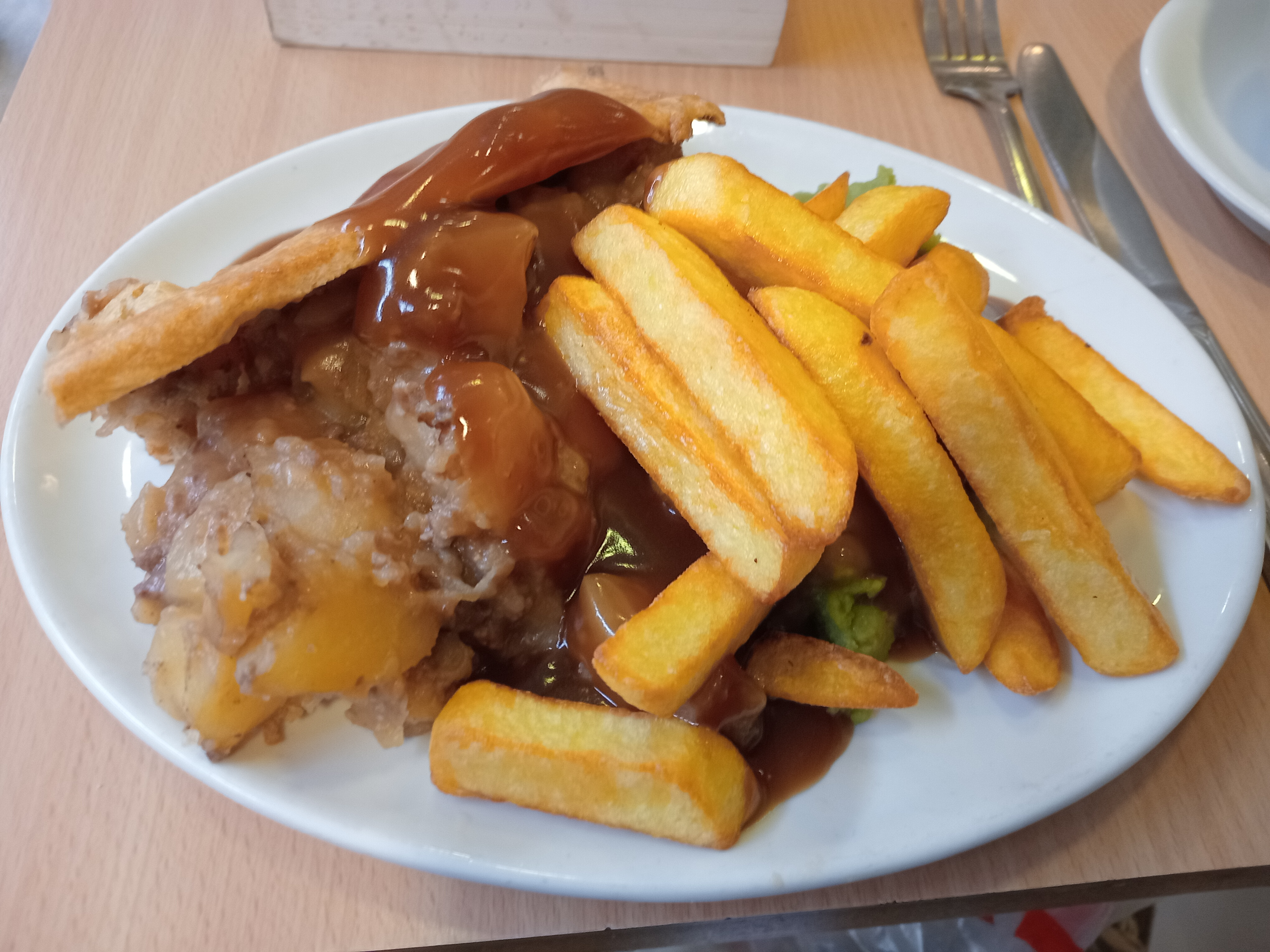
Oldham market lunch 2025
