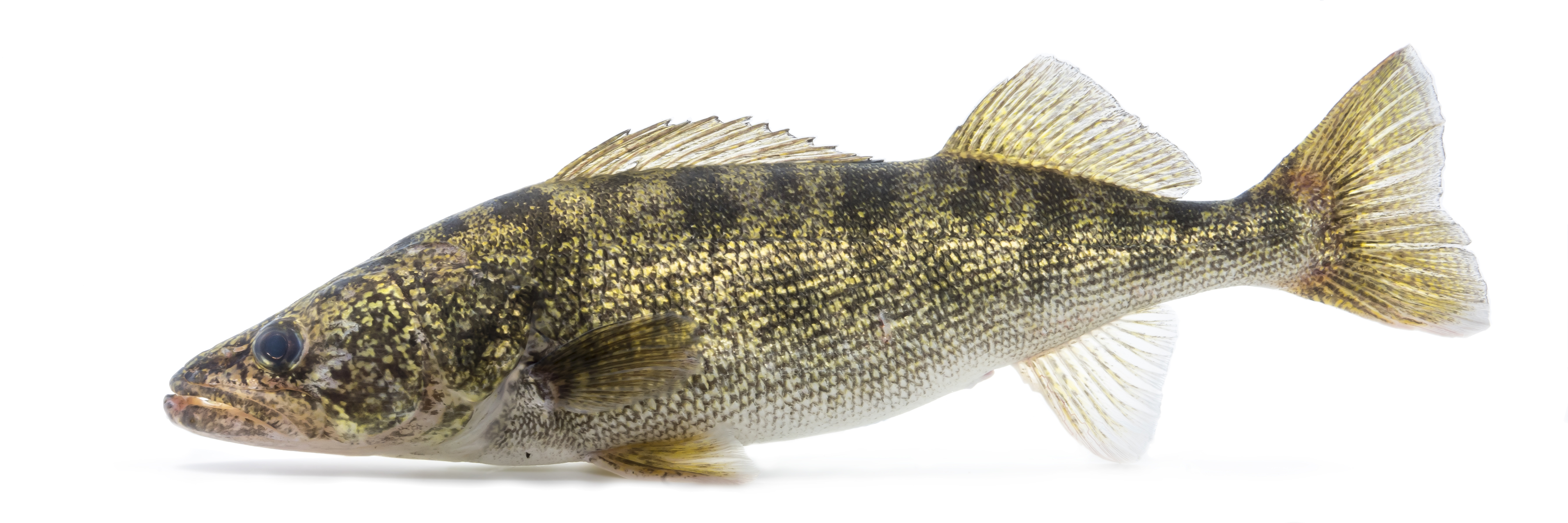

Conservation status
- Least Concern (IUCN 3.1)

Scientific classification
- Kingdom: Animalia
- Phylum: Chordata
- Class: Actinopterygii
- Division: Teleostei
- Order: Perciformes
- Family: Percidae
- Subfamily: Luciopercinae
- Genus: Sander
- Species: S. vitreus

Binomial name
- Sander vitreus (Mitchill, 1818)

Synonyms
- List: Perca vitrea Mitchill, 1818; Stizostedion vitreum (Mitchill, 1818); Lucioperca americana Cuvier, 1828; Lucioperca grisea DeKay, 1842; Stizostedion glaucum Hubbs, 1926

= Walleye =

Species of fish

The walleye (Sander vitreus, synonym Stizostedion vitreum), also called the walleyed pike, yellow pike, yellow pikeperch or yellow pickerel, is a freshwater perciform fish native to most of Canada and to the Northern United States. It is a North American close relative of the European zander, also known as the pikeperch. The walleye is sometimes called the yellow walleye to distinguish it from the blue walleye, which is a color morph that was once found in the southern Ontario and Quebec regions, but is now presumed extinct. However, recent genetic analysis of a preserved (frozen) 'blue walleye' sample suggests that the blue and yellow walleye were simply phenotypes within the same species and do not merit separate taxonomic classification.

In parts of its range in English-speaking Canada, the walleye is known as a pickerel, though the fish is not related to the true pickerels, which are members of the family Esocidae. It is also sometimes called a dory in British English (and its common name in French is the similar doré—meaning golden or gilded), although this name is also used for various other species.

Walleyes show a fair amount of variation across watersheds. In general, fish within a watershed are quite similar and are genetically distinct from those of nearby watersheds. The species has been artificially propagated for over a century and has been planted on top of existing populations or introduced into waters naturally devoid of the species, sometimes reducing the overall genetic distinctiveness of populations.

== Etymology ==
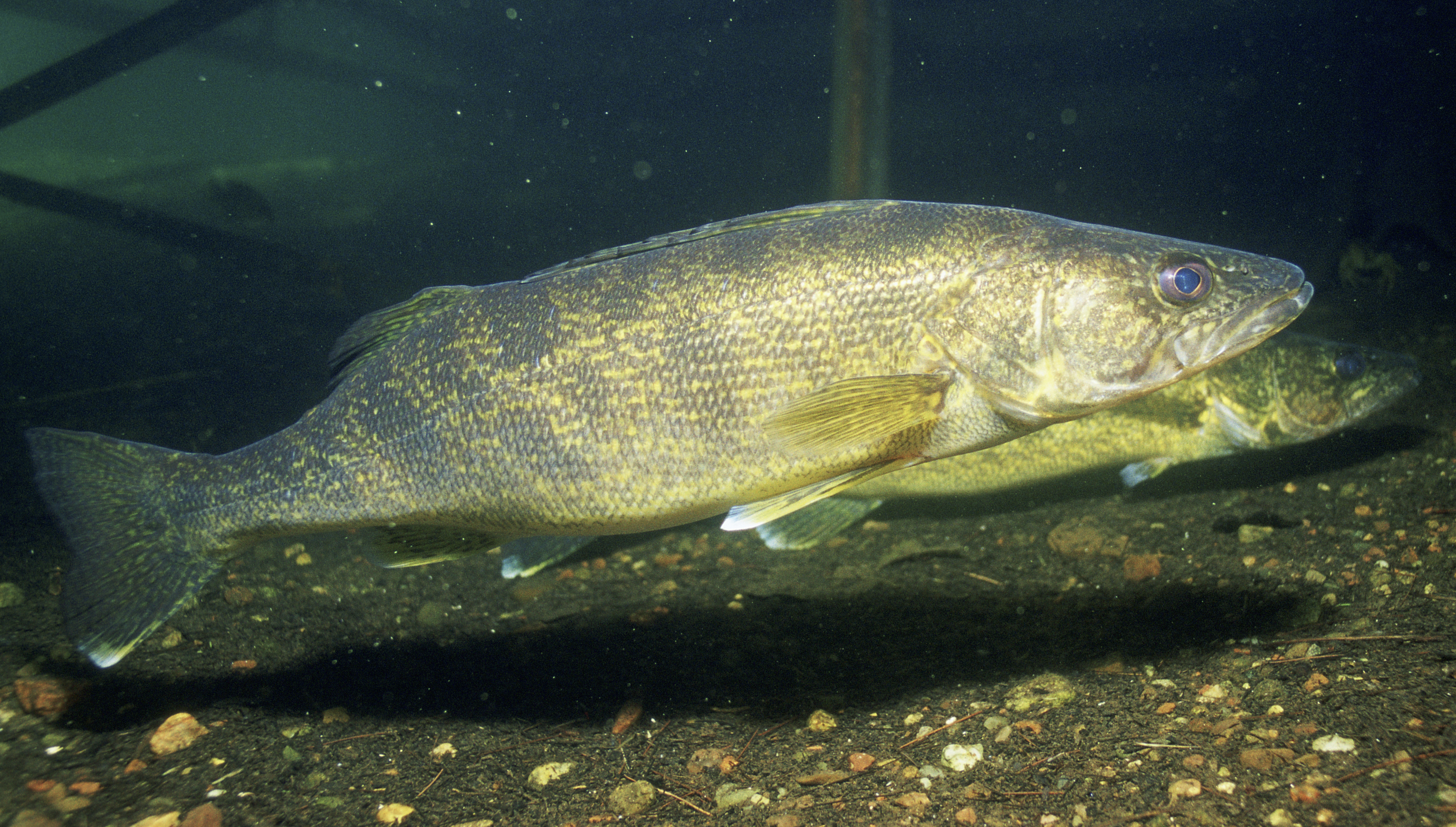
Walleye (Sander vitreus)

The name "walleye" comes from its pearlescent eyes caused by the reflective tapetum lucidum which, in addition to allowing the fish to see well in low-light conditions, gives its eyes an opaque appearance. Their vision affects their behavior. They avoid bright light and feed in low light on fish that cannot see as well as they do. Many anglers look for walleyes at night since this is when major feeding efforts occur. The fish's eyes also allow them to see well in turbid waters (stained or rough, breaking waters), which gives them an advantage over their prey. Thus, walleye anglers commonly look for locations where a good "walleye chop" (i.e., rough water) occurs. Their vision also allows the fish to populate the deeper regions in a lake, and they can often be found in deeper water, particularly during the warmest part of the summer and at night.

== Taxonomy ==
The walleye is part of the North American clade within the genus Sander, alongside the sauger (S. canadensis). Hubbs described a taxon called the blue walleye (S. glaucus) from the Great Lakes but subsequent taxonomic work showed no consistent differences between this form and the "yellow" walleye and the blue walleye is now considered to be a synonym and color variant of the walleye. The walleye was first formally described by the American naturalist Samuel Latham Mitchill (1764–1831) with the type locality given as Cayuga Lake near Ithaca, New York.

== Description ==
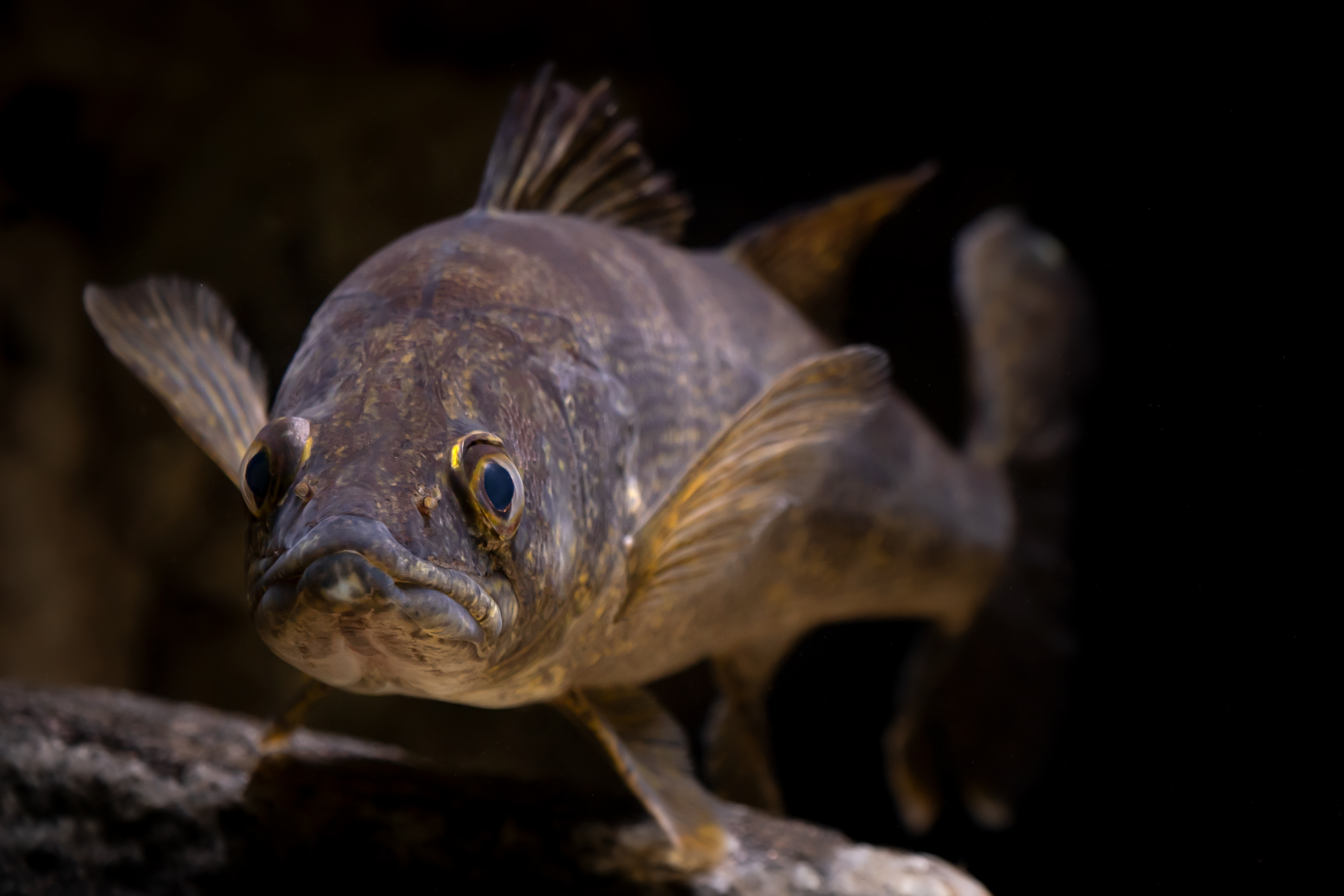
Front view

Walleyes are largely olive and gold in color (hence the French common name: doré—golden). The dorsal side of a walleye is olive, grading into a golden hue on the flanks. The olive/gold pattern is broken up by five darker saddles that extend to the upper sides. The color shades to white on the belly. The mouth of a walleye is large and is armed with many sharp teeth. The first dorsal and anal fins are spinous, as is the operculum. Walleyes are distinguished from their close relative the sauger by the white coloration on the lower lobe of the caudal fin, which is absent on the sauger. In addition, the two dorsals and the caudal fin of the sauger are marked with distinctive rows of black dots which are absent from or indistinct on the same fins of walleyes.

=== Length and weight ===
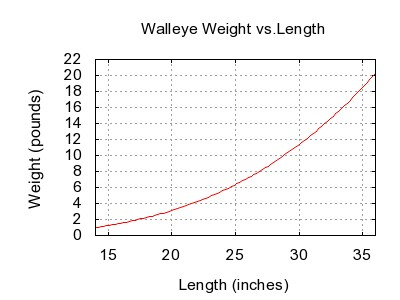
Weight and length of walleyes

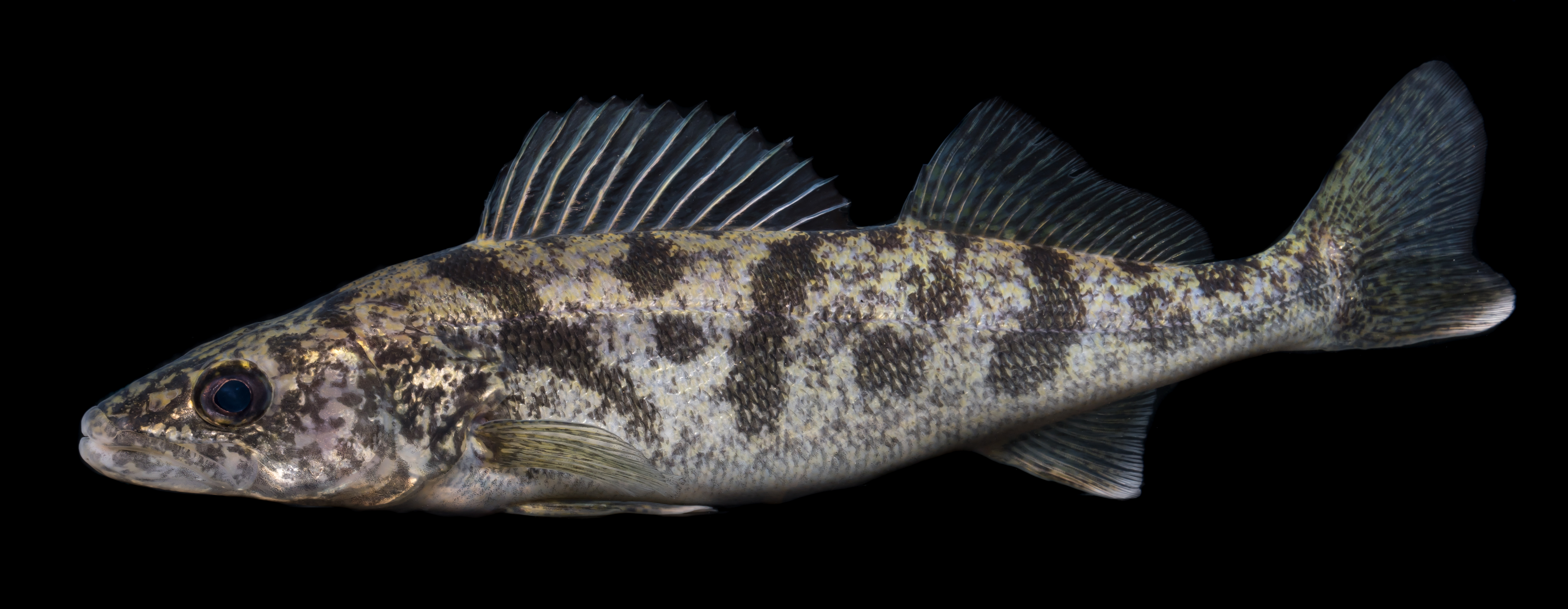
Juvenile, at Gavins Point National Fish Hatchery

Walleyes grow to about 80 cm (31 in) in length, and weigh up to about 9 kg (20 lb). The maximum recorded size for the fish is 107 cm (42 in) in length and 13 kg (29 lb) in weight. The rate depends partly on where in their range they occur, with southern populations often growing faster and larger. In general, females grow larger than males. Walleyes may live for decades; the maximum recorded age is 29 years. In heavily fished populations, however, few walleye older than five or six years of age are encountered. In North America, where they are highly prized, their typical size when caught is on the order of 30 to 50 cm (12 to 20 in), substantially below their potential size.

As walleye grow longer, they increase in weight. The relationship between total length (L) and total weight (W) for nearly all species of fish can be expressed by an equation of the form

$$W = cL^b \,$$

Invariably, b is close to 3.0 for all species, and c is a constant that varies among species. For walleye, b = 3.180 and c = 0.000228 (with units in inches and pounds) or b = 3.180 and c = 0.000005337 (with units in cm and kg).

This relationship suggests a 50 cm (20 in) walleye will weigh about 1.5 kg (3.3 lb), while a 60 cm (24 in) walleye will likely weigh about 2.5 kg (5.5 lb).

== Population dynamics ==
The Garrison Dam National Fish Hatchery at Garrison Dam, North Dakota, is the largest walleye hatchery in the world. Although they are in high demand for fishing and consumption in North Dakota, elsewhere they are considered a nuisance. For that reason GDNFH is also researching hormonal population control to provide control options to other areas.

== Reproduction ==
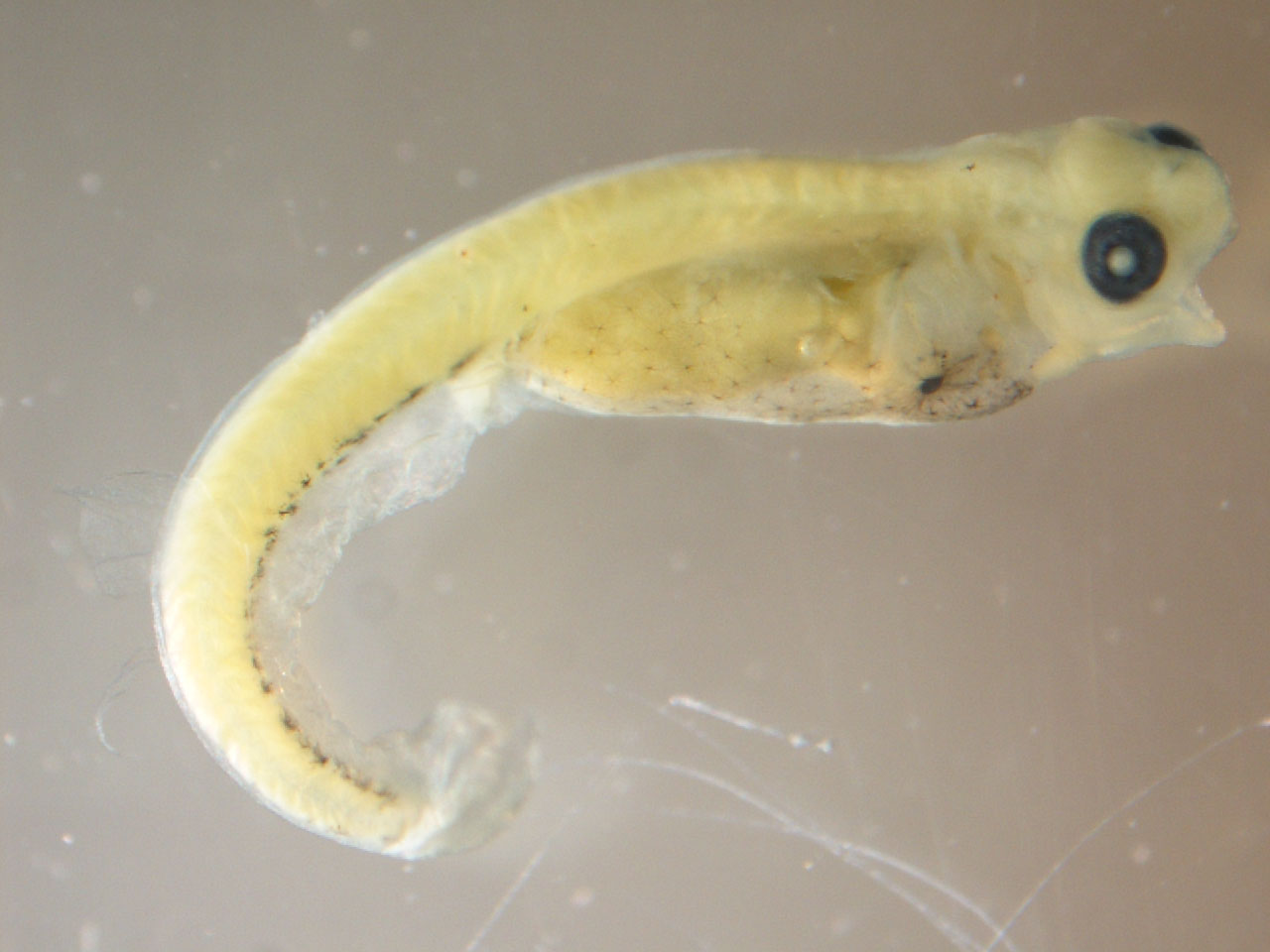
Walleye larva

In most of the species' range, male walleyes mature sexually between three and four years of age. Females normally mature about a year later. Adults migrate to tributary streams in late winter or early spring to lay eggs over gravel and rock, although open-water reef or shoal-spawning strains are seen, as well. Some populations are known to spawn on sand or vegetation. Spawning occurs at water temperatures of 6 to 10 °C (43 to 50 °F). A large female can lay up to 500,000 eggs, and no care is given by the parents to the eggs or fry. The eggs are slightly adhesive and fall into spaces between rocks. The incubation period for the embryos is temperature-dependent, but generally lasts from 12 to 30 days. After hatching, the free-swimming embryos spend about a week absorbing a relatively small amount of yolk. Once the yolk has been fully absorbed, the young walleyes begin to feed on invertebrates, such as fly larvae and zooplankton. After 40 to 60 days, juvenile walleyes become piscivorous. Thenceforth, both juvenile and adult walleyes eat fish almost exclusively, frequently yellow perch or ciscoes, moving onto bars and shoals at night to feed. Walleye also feed heavily on crayfish, minnows, and leeches.

== As food ==
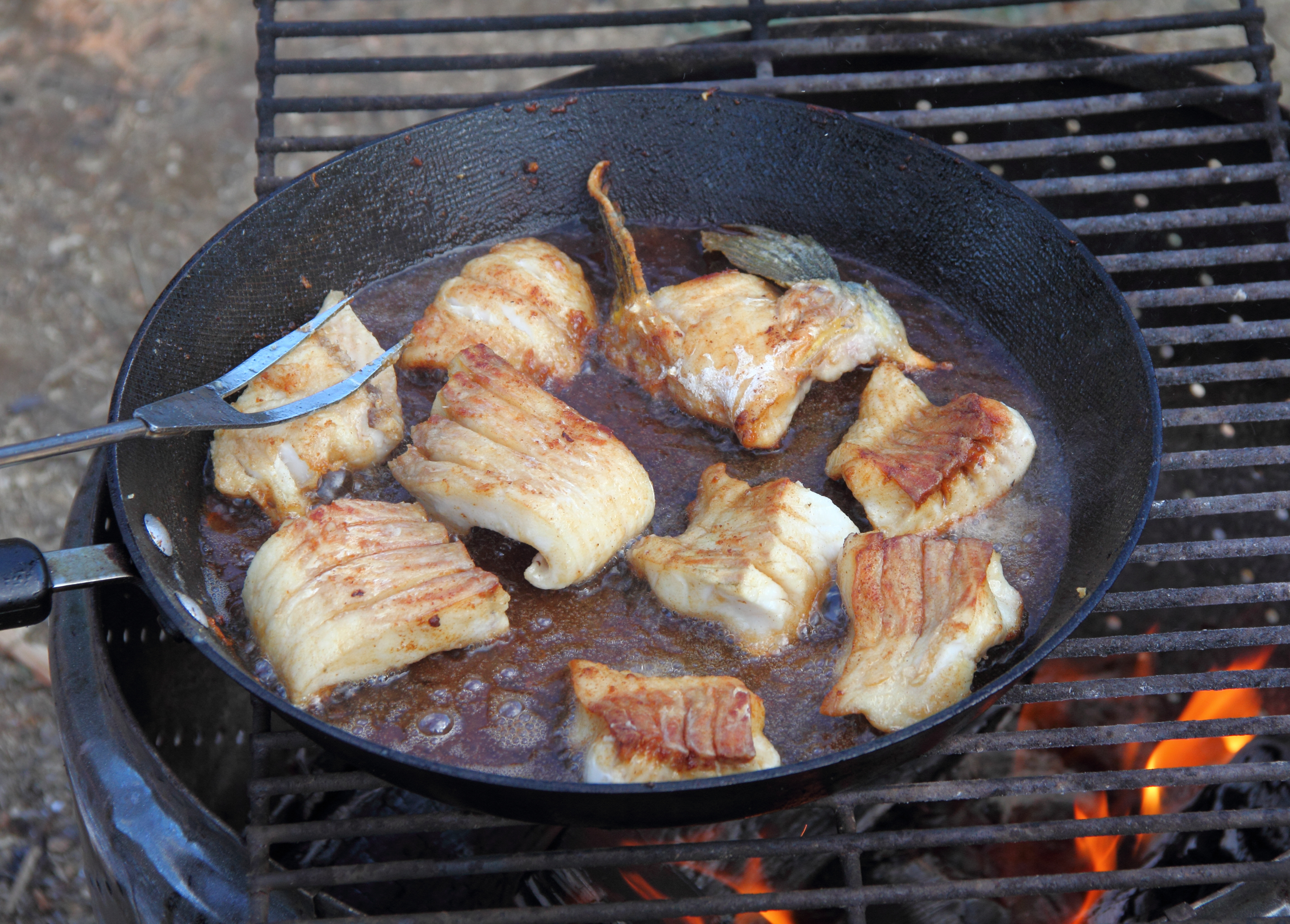
Walleye being cooked over a fire

The walleye is considered to be a quite palatable freshwater fish, and consequently, is fished recreationally and commercially for food. Because of its nocturnal feeding habits, it is most easily caught at night using live minnows or lures that mimic small fish. Most commercial fisheries for walleye are situated in the Canadian waters of the Great Lakes, and fried walleye is considered a staple of Canadian cuisine. In Minnesota, the walleye is often fished in the late afternoon on windy days (known as a "walleye chop") or at night. A walleye sandwich is commonly served in Minnesota's pubs, and deep-fried on a stick at the Minnesota State Fair. Fried walleye is a favored dish in both Canada and Minnesota.

== Fishing ==
Because walleyes are popular with anglers, fishing for walleyes is regulated by most natural resource agencies. Management may include the use of quotas and length limits to ensure that populations are not overexploited. For example, in Michigan, walleyes shorter than 15 in (38 cm) may not be legally kept.

Since walleyes have excellent visual acuity under low illumination levels, they tend to feed more extensively at dawn and dusk, on cloudy or overcast days, and under choppy conditions when light penetration into the water column is disrupted. Although anglers interpret this as light avoidance, it is merely an expression of the walleyes' competitive advantage over their prey under those conditions. Similarly, in darkly stained or turbid waters, walleyes tend to feed throughout the day. In the spring and fall, walleyes are located near the shallower areas due to the spawning grounds, and they are most often located in shallower areas during higher winds due to the murkier, higher oxygenated water at around 6 feet (1.8 m) deep. On calm spring days, walleyes are more often located at the deep side of the shoreline drop-off and around shore slopes at depths approaching 10 feet (3 m) or more.

As a result of their widespread presence in Canada and the northern United States, walleyes are frequently caught while ice fishing, a popular winter pastime throughout those regions.

"Walleye chop" is a term used by walleye anglers for rough water typically with winds of 10 to 25 km/h (6 to 16 mph), and is one of the indicators for good walleye fishing due to the walleyes' increased feeding activity during such conditions. In addition to fishing this chop, night fishing with live bait can be very effective.

The current all-tackle world record for a walleye is held by Mabry Harper, who caught an 11.34 kg (25.0 lb) walleye in Old Hickory Lake in Tennessee on 2 August 1960. LeRoy Chiovitte holds the Minnesota state-record for the walleye he caught on 13 May 1979 on the Seagull River near Saganaga Lake. The fish weighed 17 pounds 8 ounces (7.9 kg), was 35.75 inches (90.8 cm) long and had a girth of 21.25 inches (54.0 cm).

== Cultural aspects ==
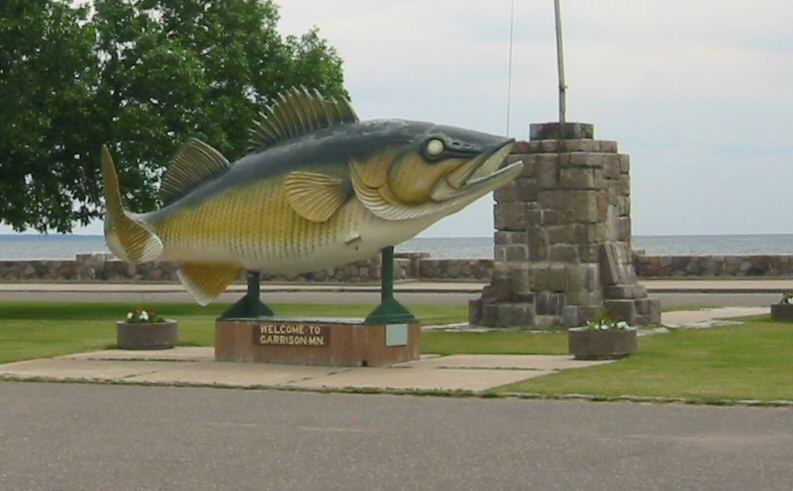
Large walleye statue at Lake Mille Lacs in Garrison, Minnesota

Walleye is a culturally significant food in the Upper Midwest. Walleye is popular in Minnesota; the Minnesota Legislature declared walleye the official state fish in 1965. Three towns—Garrison, Minnesota; Baudette, Minnesota; and Garrison, North Dakota—each claim to be the "Walleye Capital of the World" and a large statue of the fish is erected in each town. Walleye pike was declared the official "state warm water fish" of Vermont in 2012. (Vermont's official "state cold water fish" is the brook trout, Salvelinus fontinalis.)

South Dakota designated the walleye as its official state fish in 1982. Although the fish is native to South Dakota, living in Missouri River reservoirs and eastern glacial lakes of the state, it only became a popular food in South Dakota in the 1970s and 1980s, when the fishing tournament circuit promoted the fish and operated walleye fishing contests in the state.

The walleye is the official provincial fish of Manitoba. Winnipeg, Manitoba, considers the walleye (referred to locally as "pickerel") its most important local fish. Icelandic fishermen in Lake Winnipeg traditionally supplied the Winnipeg market. The walleye is also the provincial fish of Saskatchewan, which declared the species its official fish in 2015 after it won a fish emblem contest. Walleye is the most popular fish for sport fishing in Saskatchewan, and can be caught in many rivers, reservoirs, and lakes. The International Underwater Spearfishing Association record for largest spearfishing-caught walleye is held by a 13.3-pound (6.0 kg) walleye caught in 2014 on the South Saskatchewan River north of Lake Diefenbaker.

== See also ==
- Wisconsin Walleye War
