= Savvas Constantinou (filmmaker) =

Cypriot filmmaker (born 1997)

- Headshot
- Occupations: Filmmaker, multimedia educator and film festival coordinator
- Notable work: Font of Infamy; Hummings of a Hummingbird

Savvas Constantinou (born 16 September 1997) is a Cypriot film director, screenwriter, film editor, and festival programmer. He is known for directing the award-winning documentary short Font of Infamy (2020) and the animated short Hummings of a Hummingbird (2023). Constantinou serves as Head Film Festival Programmer for the Cyprus Comic Con Film Festival and has lectured in multimedia at the University of Central Lancashire Cyprus.

== Early life and education ==
Constantinou was born in Nicosia, Cyprus. He studied Mass Media and Digital Communication with a concentration in film at the University of Nicosia, graduating with a bachelor's degree in 2021.

== Career ==
Constantinou began his filmmaking career directing the documentary short Font of Infamy (2020), which received recognition at international film festivals.

In 2023 he directed the animated short Hummings of a Hummingbird, which screened at multiple international film festivals, including the Oscar-qualifying CINANIMA International Animated Film Festival.

Alongside his filmmaking work, Constantinou has worked in television post-production, motion graphics and commercial media production. He has contributed editing and motion graphics to productions for SPP Media, Yoshiro Digital, Sigma TV and ANT1 Cyprus, as well as commercial campaigns for international brands for Disney, Vogue and many others.

Since 2023 he has served as Head Film Festival Programmer for the Cyprus Comic Con Film Festival. He previously served as Vice President of the Cyprus Animation Association and in 2024 founded a media production company named Constant Media.

== Filmography ==
Year	Title	Role
2020	Font of Infamy	Director, writer, editor
2023	Hummings of a Hummingbird	Director, writer, editor

== See also ==
- Cinema of Cyprus
- List of Cypriot films
