= List of Cypriot films =

An A-Z list of feature films produced in Cyprus:

== A ==
- Afti i nihta meni (1999)
- Agapanthemon (1982)
- Agapes kai kaimoi [Love Affairs and Heartbreaks] (1971), directed by George Fillis
- Akamas (2006)
- Anastenazoun oi penies (1970)
- Anazitontas tin eftihia (1972)
- Attilas '74 (1974)
- Aviotes mnimes (2000)
- Avrianos polemistis (1981)

== B ==
- Bar (2001)
- Bourek (2015)

== C ==
- Çamur (2003)
- Castro's Cuba (1989) (TV)
- The Cherry Orchard (1999)
- Committed (2014)
- Cypriot National Final (2005) (TV)

== D ==
- Dakrya kai diplopennies (1969)
- Diakopes stin Kypro mas (1971)
- Don't make a sound (2009)
- Dromoi kai portokalia (1996)
- Dyo ilioi ston ourano [Two Suns in the Sky] (1991)
- Deserted (Απομόνωση) (2010)

== E ==
- Ego... kai to pouli mou(1982)
- Eidan ta matia mas giortes (2000)
- Ena koritsi pou ta thelei ola (1972)
- Espresso (2000)
- Evaporating Borders (2014)

== F ==
- Forgetting Aphrodite (2004)
- Fish n' Chips (2011)
- Ftero tis mygas, To (1995)
- Funeral 1998
- Font of Infamy (2020)

== G ==
- Guilt (2009)

== H ==
- Halam Geldi (2013)
- Honey and Wine (2006)
- House of the Insect (2002)
- The Hunt (Av) (2020) short

== I ==
- Idoni tis diastrofis (1974)
- If Aphrodite had arms (2007)

== K ==
- Kai to treno pai ston ourano (2002)
- Kalabush (2002)
- Kato apo ta asteria (2001)
- Kavafis (1996)
- Kismet: How Turkish Soap Operas Changed the World (2014)
- Knifer (2010)
- Kokkinos drakos (1998)
- Kyklos tis amartias
- Kyrios me ta gri, O (1997)
- Kayip Otobus (2007)
- Kypron, ou m' ethespisen...(Helen) (1962)

== L ==
- Leptomereia stin Kypro (1987)
- I Lesvia (1975)

== M ==
- Malgaat (2005)
- I Mavri Emmanouella (1979)
- Mavrosoufitsa (2002)
- Me ton Orfea ton Avgousto (1995)

== N ==
- Nisi tis Afroditis, To (1965)

–

== O ==
- Oikopedo Dodeka (2013)
- One Day with George in Cyprus (2016)
- One in a Million (2005)
- Our Lovely Nicos (2014)

== P ==
- Passenger from San Francisco (2014)
- Pause (2018)
- Pyla, living together separately (2003)
- Pharmakon (2006)
- Private Movies: Lady of the Rings (2005)
- Private Movies: Lady of the Rings 2 (2005)
- Poliorkia stin odo Liperti (2019)
- Pouli Tis Kyprou, To (2014)

== R ==
- Resurrection (2006)
- Road to Ithaca, The (1999)

== S ==
- Salvador (2014)
- Sfagi tou kokora, I (1996)
- She Should Run - Cyprus (2020)
- Smuggling Hendrix (2019)
- Snow on the Blades (2014)
- Social Dinner (2003)
- Stratos (2014)
- Sunrise in Kimmeria (2018)

== T ==
- To Tama (2000)
- To Teleftaio fili (1970)
- The Man with the Answers (2021)

== V ==
- Vasiliki (1997)
- O Viasmos tis Afroditis [The Rape of Aphrodite] (1985), directed by Andreas Pantzis
- Visions of Europe (2004)

== W ==
- The Wastrel (1961)

== See also ==
- List of Turkish films
- List of Greek films
- Cinema of Cyprus
- Cinema of Turkey
- Cinema of Greece
