= Cinema of Cyprus =

The cinema of Cyprus (Note: Including the Republic of Cyprus but excluding Northern Cyprus, which is not legally recognised by any country other than Turkey.) came into existence much later than others, with the 1960s generally being accepted as the industry's earliest notable history. The industry has historically suffered from slow growth due to the island's small population—a large percentage of whom are preoccupied by the Cyprus problem—and its awkward geographical location at the crossroads of Southeast Europe, West Asia, and the Middle East.

The country's film industry has progressed exponentially since the late 2010s, when Cyprus began marketing itself to foreign studios with the nickname "Olivewood" and convinced producers from influential film industries such as Hollywood to choose it as a filming location, in addition to Cypriot filmmakers receiving praise at foreign festivals and the Christodoulides government giving the arts sector an unprecedented level of financial support as part of its Invest Cyprus scheme.

== Overview ==
=== History ===
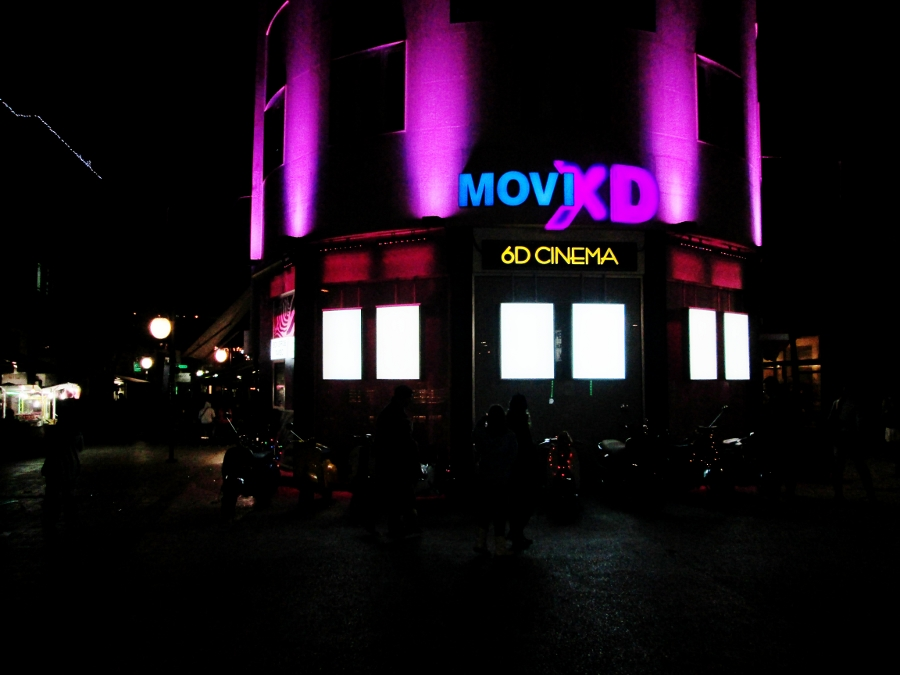
A cinema on Ledra Street in 2012

Michael Cacoyannis became the most famous Cypriot filmmaker to date when he wrote, directed, edited, and produced Zorba the Greek (1964). Another filmmaker working at the same time was George Filis, who made the films Loves and Woes (1967), (Note: Greek: Agapes kai kaimoi.) The Last Kiss (1970), (Note: Greek: To teleftaio fili.) Gregoris Afxentiou: A Hero With a Memoir (1973), (Note: Greek: Gregoris Afxentiou: Enas roas me to mnimoskopio.) This Is How Cyprus Was Betrayed (1974), (Note: Greek: Etsi prodothike i Kypros.) and The Mega Document (1979). (Note: Greek: To mega dokoumento.) The only films by Filis that are not political works about the Cyprus Emergency or the Turkish invasion are Loves and Woes, a documentary about traditional Cypriot dances and music, and The Last Kiss, a romantic drama.

Since 1989, Cypriot co-productions have been eligible for funding from the Council of Europe's Eurimages Fund. To date, four feature films on which a Cypriot was listed as an executive producer have received funding from Eurimages: Of Greece (scheduled for 1995 but unreleased), (Note: Greek: Hellados, also planned to be released under the English title And the Trains Fly to the Sky.) The Slaughter of the Rooster (1996), (Note: Greek: I sphagi tou kokora.) The Promise (1999), (Note: Greek: To Tama.) and The Road to Ithica (2000). (Note: Greek: O Dromos gia tin Ithaki.) There is also a government-backed initiative for filmmakers to apply for funding from the Invest Cyprus scheme, which absorbed the former Filming in Cyprus scheme upon its creation in 2024.

In 1994, Cypriot film production received a boost with the establishment of the island's Cinema Advisory Committee. By 2000, the annual amount set aside for filmmaking in the national budget was CYP£500,000 (approximately €850,000). Statistics showed that in 2011 the country hosted 30 cinema screens, produced three films (two fictional and one documentary), sold 870,000 tickets, and grossed €7.11 million at the box office. At the same time, its three biggest distributors were (in order) Four Stars Films, Odeon, and Feelgood. Marios Piperides' film Smuggling Hendrix (2018) received acclaim at that year's Tribeca Film Festival, while Tonia Mishiali's film Pause (2018) also received positive reviews.

=== Filming location ===
Since around 2018, Cyprus has attempted to market itself as a filming location and branded itself "Olivewood", a play on "Hollywood" and a reference to both the island's olive oil production and the olive branch featured on its flag. The Hollywood action film Jiu Jitsu (2020) starring Nicolas Cage was shot in Cyprus, which doubled for Myanmar, but was a critical and commercial failure; it also became embroiled in a controversy when the filmmakers promised to sue President Nicos Anastasiades' second government for breach of contract due to the non-payment of the €8 million rebate outlined in their contract, resulting in the potential production of at least three more Hollywood films being moved elsewhere, which was estimated to have lost millions in expected revenue for the economy of Cyprus and took away many potential jobs for local film crew.

Despite the setback caused by Jiu-Jitsu, Hollywood producers returned to the island when Nikos Christodoulides won the 2023 Cypriot presidential election and instructed his government to restart discussions with Hollywood while giving an unprecedented level of support to the island's arts sector through its new Invest Cyprus scheme. American studio Jupiter Peak Productions came on board for Find Me Falling (2024), a romantic comedy starring Harry Connick Jr. Written, directed, and co-produced by Stelana Kliris, it became the first Hollywood film to be both set and filmed in Cyprus; it was released on Netflix, becoming the first film directed by a Cypriot to receive a worldwide Netflix premiere. It received mixed reviews. The drama film All That's Left of You (2025), an Arabic-language co-production between Germany and Cyprus, was set to film in Palestine until the Gaza war forced production to move to Cyprus. The film premiered at the 2025 Sundance Film Festival, becoming the first Cypriot production to do so.

=== Production companies ===
Film and television production companies in Cyprus include AMP Filmworks, Bark Like a Cat Films, Blunatic Pictures, Caretta Films, The Coffee Films, Cube Productions, Cult Experiences, Filmblades, Leka Productions, Meraki Films, Pygmalion Film Productions, Ray Films, ResetFilms, Rin Sky Films, Seahorse Films, Volume Films, and Wishing Tree Films, as well as the Cypriot branch of Greek production company Green Olive Films. Annual festivals include the [[Cyprus International Film Festival|Cyprus International Film Festival]] and the [[International Short Film Festival of Cyprus|International Short Film Festival of Cyprus]].

== Notable people ==
- Michael Cacoyannis (1922–2011), Greek-Cypriot filmmaker
- Elias Demetriou, Greek-Cypriot filmmaker
- Yannis Economides (born 1967), Greek-Cypriot filmmaker
- Nicolas Economou (1953–1993), Greek-Cypriot composer
- Stelana Kliris, South African-born Greek-Cypriot filmmaker
- Peter Polycarpou (born 1957), English-Cypriot actor
- Derviş Zaim (born 1964), Turkish-Cypriot filmmaker

== See also ==
- Cinema of Greece
- Cinema of Turkey
- Culture of Cyprus
- Culture of Greece
- Culture of Turkey
- List of cinema of the world
- List of Cypriot films
- List of Greek actors
- List of Turkish actors
- World cinema
