= Portland Fish Market =

Fish market in Portland, Oregon, U.S.

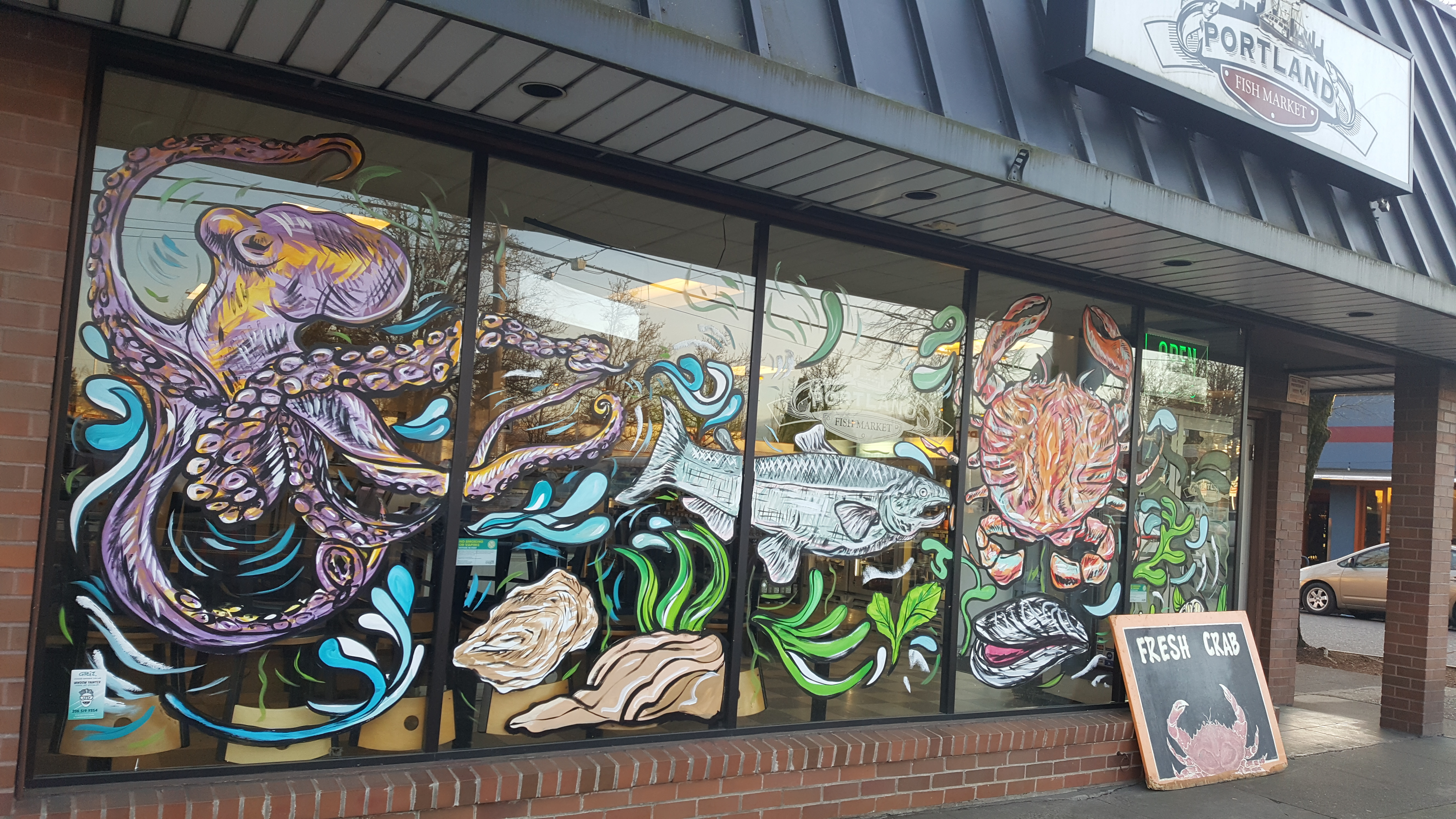
- The shop's exterior in 2022
- Interactive map of Portland Fish Market

Restaurant information
- Established: 2014
- Owners: Agnes and Ben Berkowitz; Mike and Brandi Shirley
- Food type: Seafood
- Location: 4404 Southeast Woodstock Boulevard, Portland, Multnomah, Oregon, 97206, United States
- Coordinates: 45.4790°N 122.6173°W
- Website: portlandfishmarket.com

Portland Fish Market is a fish market in Portland, Oregon. The fish and chips the market offers in addition to its fresh seafood has received some local accolades.

== Description ==
Portland Fish Market (PFM) is a fish market in southeast Portland's Woodstock neighborhood. The shop stocks local fish (including cod, halibut, salmon, sea bass, steelhead, sturgeon, and yellowfin tuna), clams, king crab, oysters, and scallops. Wild (not farmed) seafood are sourced from various cities, including Garibaldi and Netarts, Oregon, and Ilwaco, Washington. Canned oysters and Dungeness crab are also available.

PFM is open daily. The business also operates a fish and chips window on one side of the shop, serving a variety of fried seafood. The window operates from Wednesday to Sunday, as of 2016. Fried fish baskets come with cod, lingcod, halibut, oyster, rockfish, salmon, or shrimp. The business uses a house-made tartar sauce. Drink options include bottles of Topo Chico, canned beer, or wine.

== History ==
Agnes and Ben Berkowitz and Mike and Brandi Shirley opened PFM in 2014, in a space which previously housed a RadioShack outlet. The fish and chips window opened in 2016. PFM has been described as the city's first "boat-to-table" fish and chip shop. The business offered smoked and fresh fish available for delivery during the COVID-19 pandemic.

== Reception ==
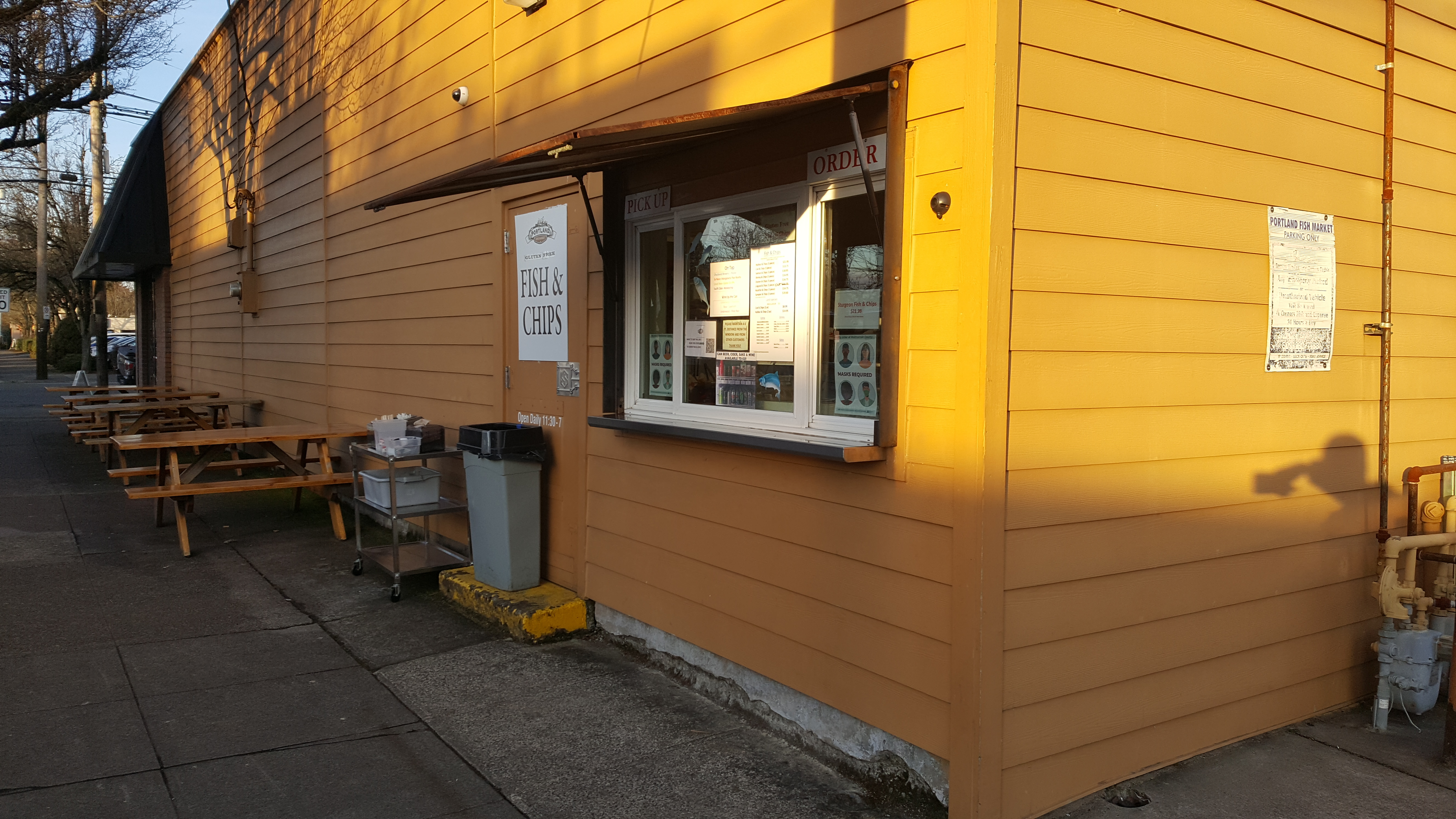
The fish and chips window, 2022

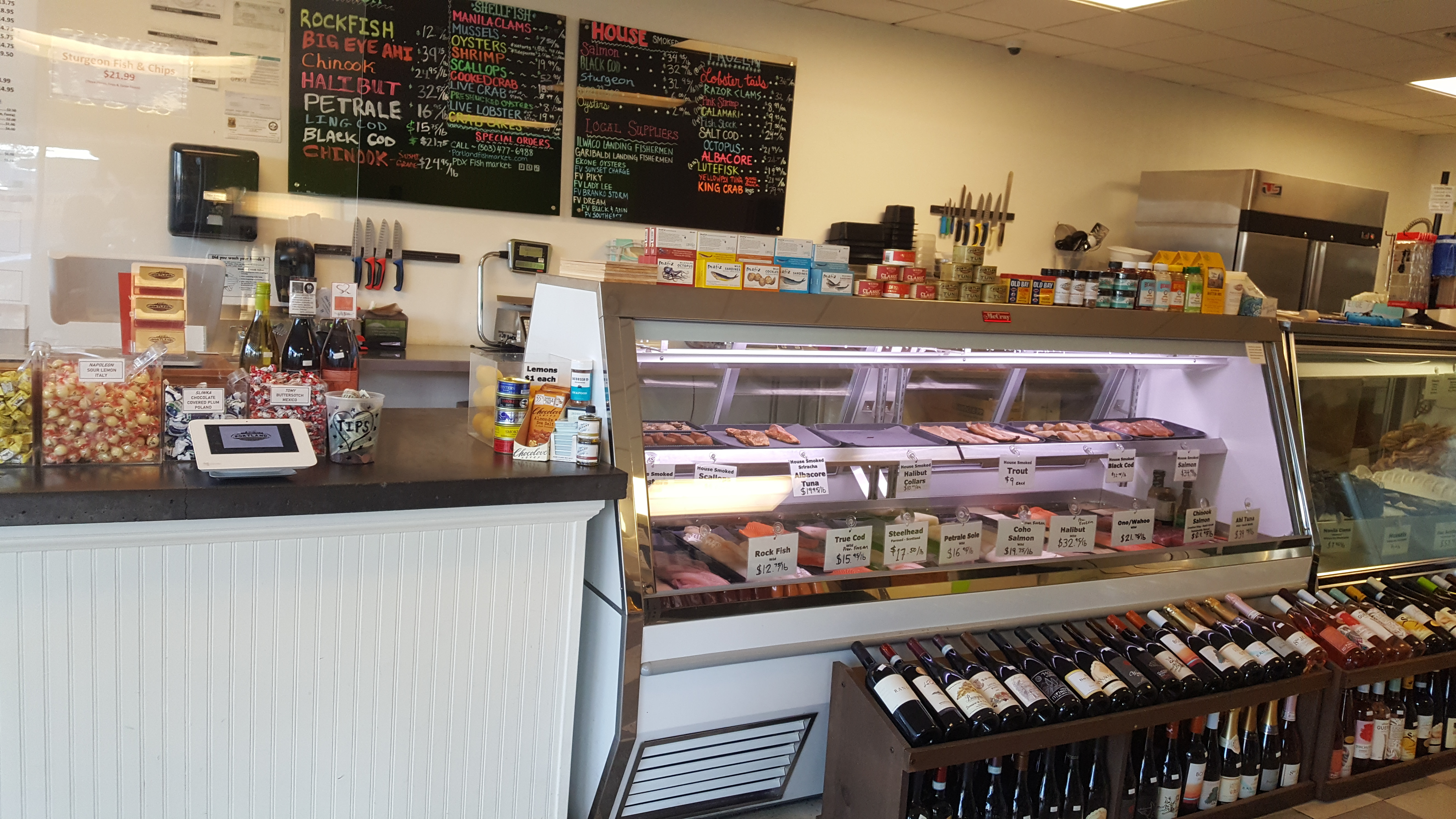
The shop's interior in 2022

In 2016, Matthew Korfhage of Willamette Week said the rockfish "was some of the best fried fish I've had in town—a layer cake of fatty feeling with crisp and buttery breading around equally buttery fish. It evokes a sense of well-being that has history to it, lodged deep in the memory of anyone raised on trips to both Horse Brass and the coast. If you see the rockfish, or any other fish of the day, that's what you should order." He wrote:

This is not fancy food, but it is the food that fishermen eat. It is also the food that they make for themselves out on the coast. And for one brief moment at the picnic tables, eating fish with one hand while pulling your jacket tight against the wind and rain with the other, you can fool yourself into thinking that's where you are.

PFM placed third in the Best Fish and Chips category of Willamette Week's annual "Best of Portland" readers' poll in 2017. Kara Stokes included the fish and chips window in Eater Portland's 2018 list of "13 Hidden Spots to Eat and Drink in Portland", in which she recommended the two-piece cod lunch special and described PFM as one of the city's best fish markets. The website's Brooke Jackson-Glidden included PFM in a 2020 list of "Where to Find Knockout Fish and Chips in Portland", in which she said the business "has some of the best selection around". Eater Portland's Jenni Moore included PFM in a 2021 list of "12 Stellar Portland Seafood Restaurants", and Nathan Williams recommended the shop in a 2022 overview of eateries in Woodstock.

Kelly Clarke included PFM in Portland Monthly's 2019 overview of the city's best seafood markets. Jamie Hale included PFM in The Oregonian's 2021 list of the "12 best fish and chip spots in Portland". Hale recommended the halibut and wrote, "The Portland Fish Market is the definition of solid fish and chips: high quality, with nothing fancy about it." Blair Stenvick included PFM in the Portland Mercury's 2021 overview of southeast Portland specialty shops "swimming in sublime ingredients", in which she said the fish and chips window had a loyal following.

== See also ==
- List of fish and chip restaurants
- List of seafood restaurants
