= Papa's Fish and Chips =

British fish and chip shop chain

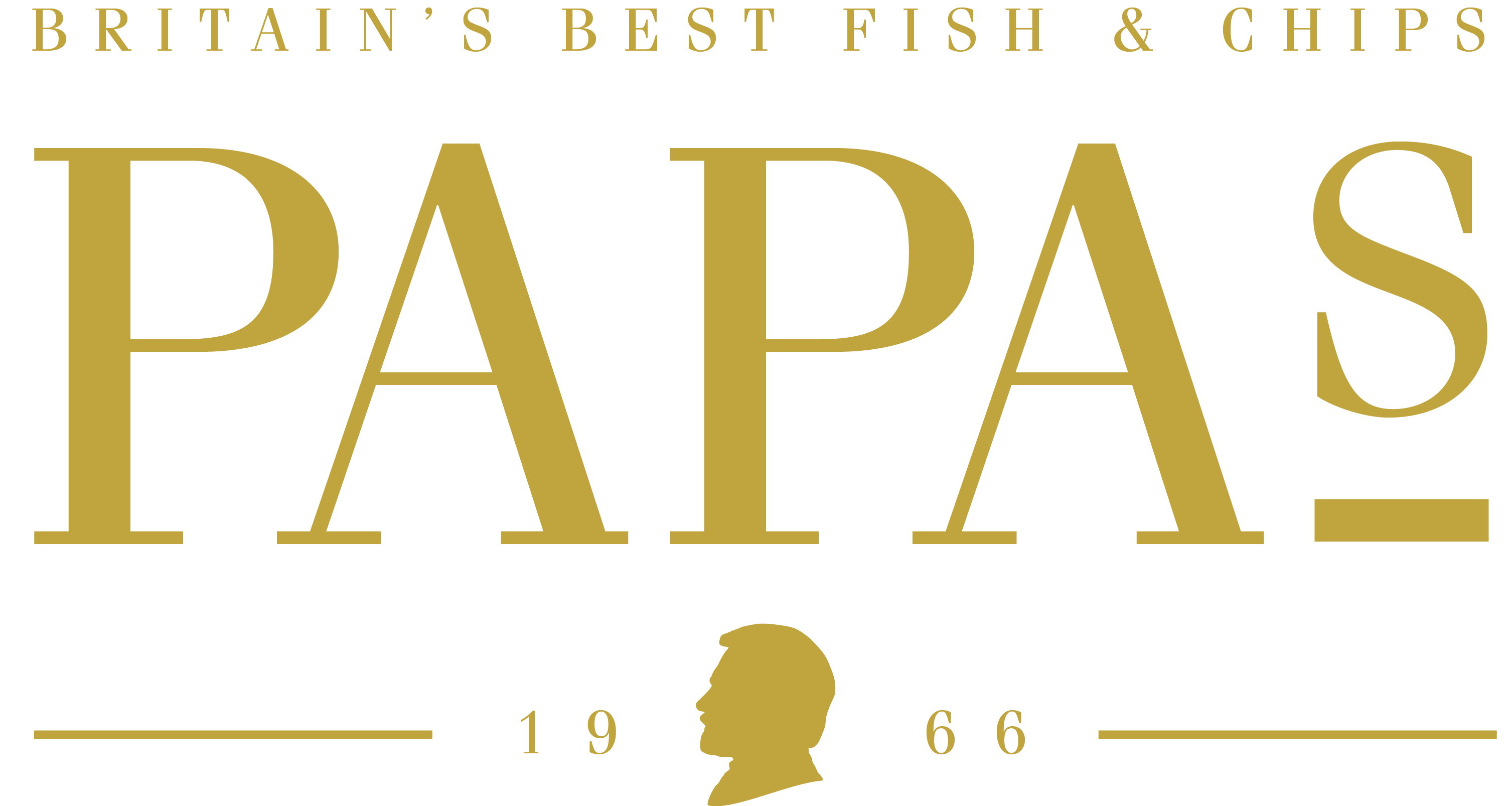
- Papa's Fish & Chips Company Logo
- Founded: 1966
- Founder: Mr Papas
- Number of locations: Willerby, Cleethorpes, Bilton, Kingswood, Hull City Centre, Scarborough, York, Whitby, Bridlington, Skegness, Blackpool
- Products: Fish and chips

Papa's is the oldest running family-owned group of fish and chip shops. Papas was founded in 1966, by Mr Papas.

In 2015, the family opened their largest restaurant to date, a 320-seat restaurant and takeaway, which was the world's biggest fish and chip shop, in Willerby in the East Riding of Yorkshire. In August 2016, they announced expansion into Hull with the conversion of the Swiss Cottage public house into a 250-seat restaurant and takeaway.

Papa's competed against other top fish and chip shops in 2017 to win a BBC contest, The Best of British Takeaways. In this competition they were crowned "Britain's Best Fish and Chips".

Cleethorpes Pier was purchased by Papa's for an undisclosed fee in December 2016. The Papas Cleethorpes restaurant and takeaway is one of the world's biggest fish and chip shops with over 500 seats.

Further expansion in Hull took place in December 2020 with the opening of a restaurant in the Kingswood area, that also operates a drive-through service.

The Bilton outlet was refurbished and a drive-through facility was added and opened in January 2021.

On 6 July 2021, Papa's announced that they were opening additional fish and chip restaurants in Blackpool, Sheffield and Skegness.

== See also ==
- List of fish and chip restaurants
