= Doyles on the Beach =

Australian seafood restaurant

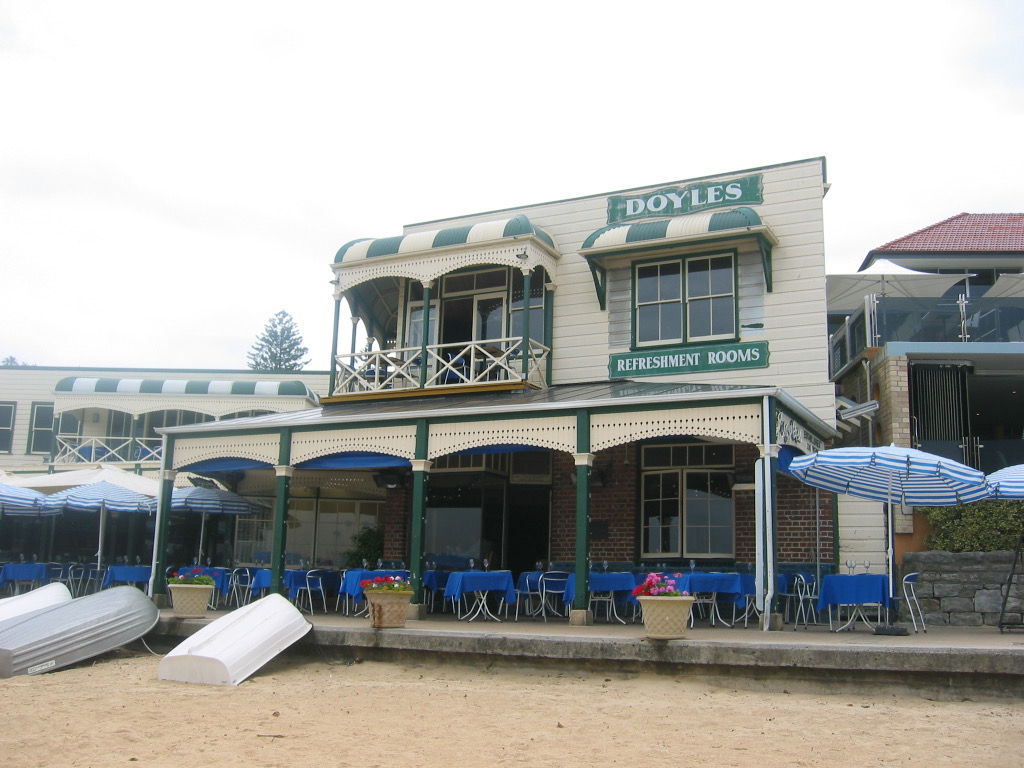
- The restaurant in 2006
- Interactive map of Doyles on the Beach

Restaurant information
- Established: 1885
- Owner: Michael Doyle
- Location: 11 Marine Parade, Watsons Bay, New South Wales, 2030, Australia
- Coordinates: 33°50′35″S 151°16′55″E
- Reservations: Yes
- Website: www.doyles.com.au

Doyles on the Beach is an Australian seafood restaurant founded in 1885. Located on Marine Parade in Watsons Bay, Sydney, it is Australia's oldest continually running fish and chip shop, currently owned by Michael Doyle. There is both an à la carte restaurant and a garden bar at the Marine Parade establishment. It has two sisters restaurants: Doyles Fishermans Wharf, also in Watsons Bay, and Doyles at the Sydney Fish Market.

In 2021, the restaurant was named in GQ's list of the "18 most expensive restaurants in Australia".

One of the restaurant's attractions is the view over Sydney Harbour of the downtown Sydney skyline four miles to the east.

== Gallery ==
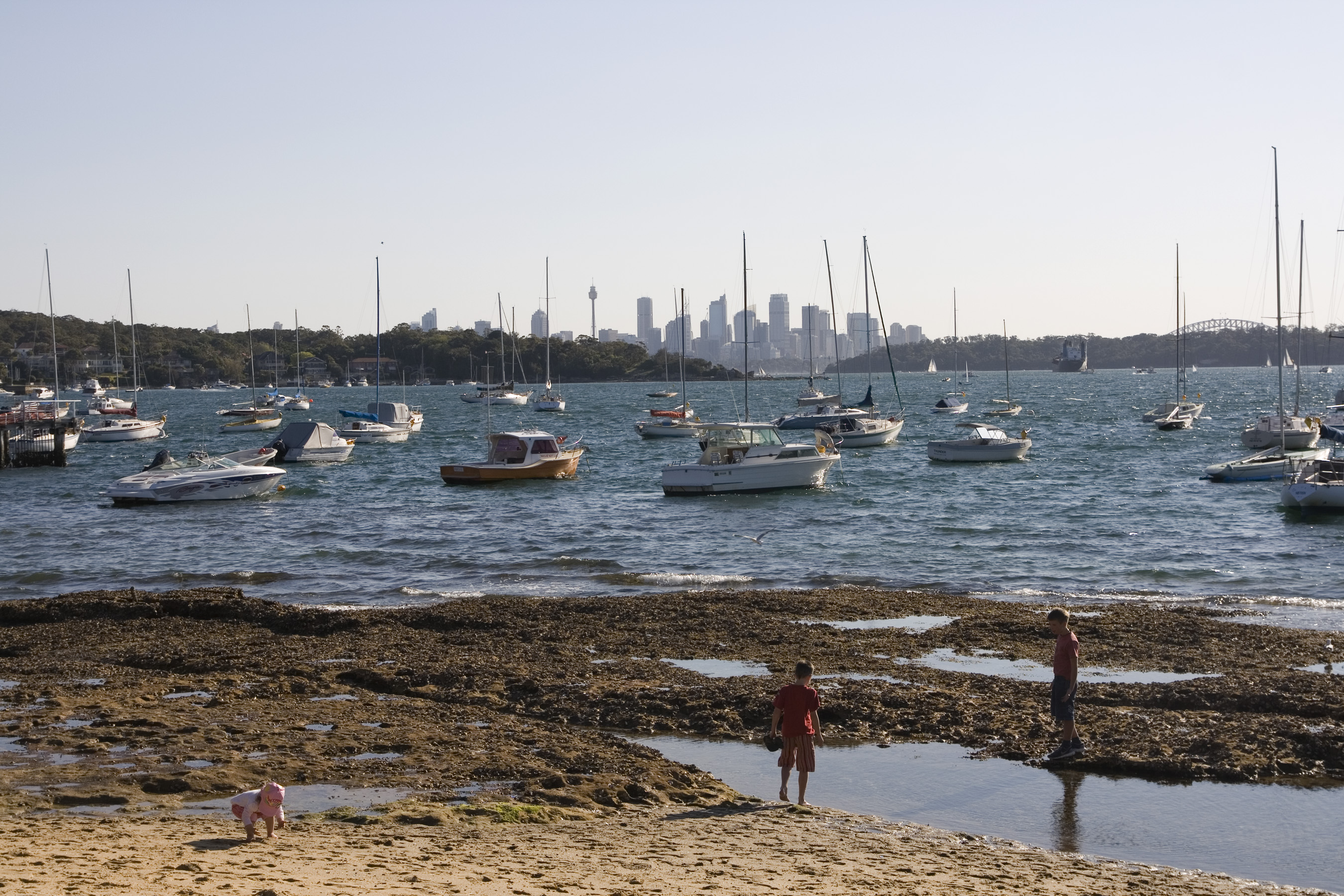
View of the Sydney skyline from the restaurant's patio

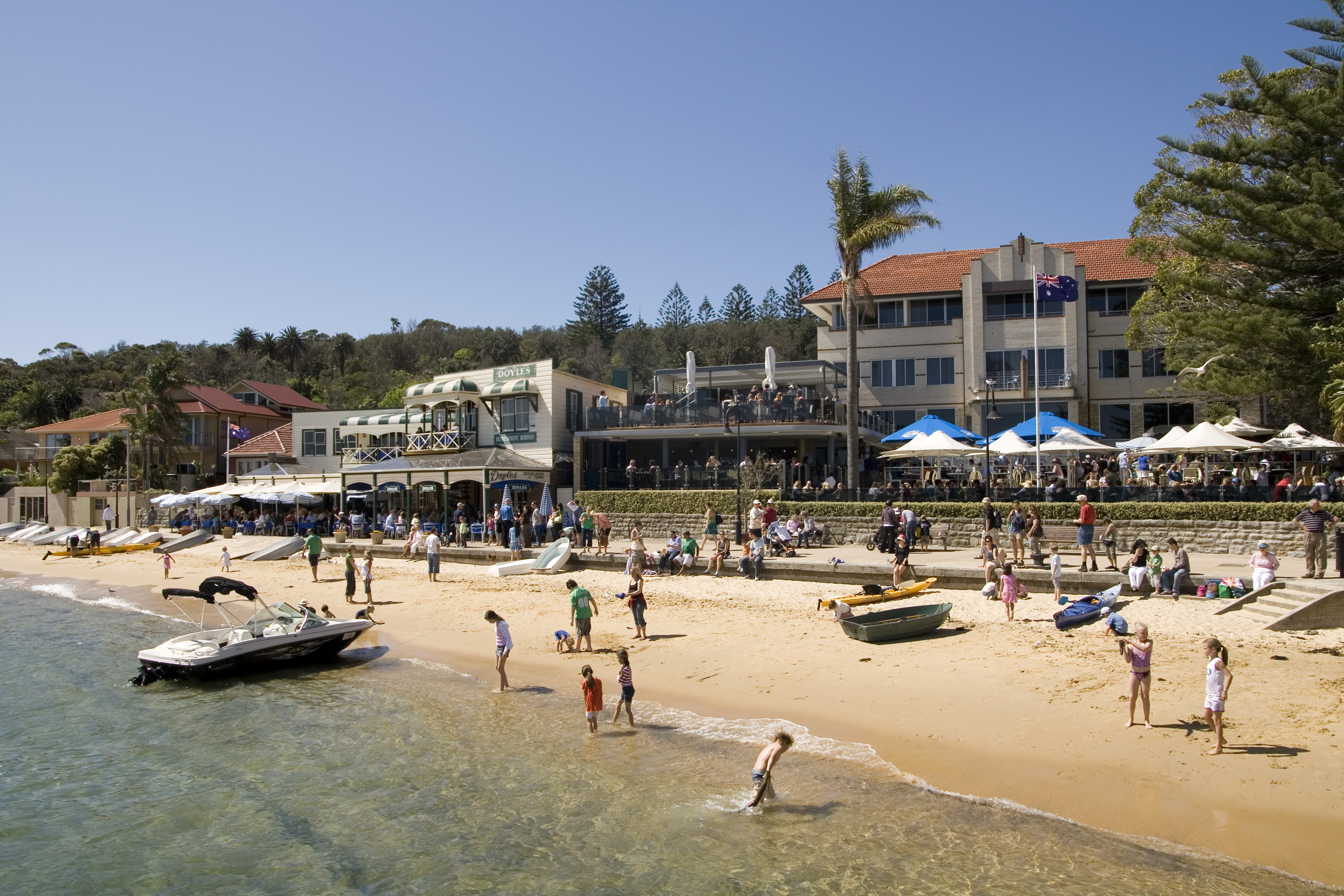
The restaurant's location overlooking Watsons Bay Beach

== See also ==
- List of oldest companies in Australia
- List of fish and chip restaurants
- List of seafood restaurants
