= The Fryer's Delight =

Fish and chip shop in London

Coordinates: 51.520379°N 0.117329°W

- Founded: 1958
- Founder: Giovanni and Giuseppe Ferdenzi
- Headquarters: Theobald's Road, London
- Products: fish and chips

The Fryer's Delight is a fish and chip shop in the Bloomsbury district of London, England. It was started by Italian brothers, Giovanni and Giuseppe Ferdenzi, who came from Piacenza and worked there for many years. It is said to be popular with London cab drivers.

The fish is the traditional choices of cod, haddock, plaice and skate. The chips are fried to be fluffy on the inside while crisp outside. The frying is done in traditional beef dripping, which gives the food a distinctive taste.

Beef dripping is the key to the overall sensation. Unlike vegetable oil, it isn't neutral. Its flavour keys the flavours of the other elements. The batter tends to be very slightly more substantial than that in the Modern School chippies, but then Old School batter is eaten on its own as part of the dish in its own right, not simply as a vehicle for the fish. The chips, too, take on a sweeter, meaty note.

— Matthew Fort, The Guardian, 22 January 2009

== Reception ==
Sandra Gustafson, in Cheap Eats in London, described it as one of the best fish and chip shops in London and said that Joan Rivers used to eat there when she visited. Kevin Allen, in The Hidden Agenda, described it as "the very best fish and chips in town". In 2012, The Londonist's "fish and chip detective" rated it 6/10 describing the food as average but the ambience as an "unimpeachably charming old-school atmosphere". Bella Blissett of the Evening Standard, described it as "proper old-fashioned fish'n'chips; the kind that used to be doled out in newspaper".

Lisa Harris and Sarah Randell, of Sainsbury's magazine rated it 8/10, "Fish is deep-fried the old fashioned way, in beef dripping, so you get a crisp, dark batter with perfectly cooked cod underneath. ... Formica tables, shared booths and an old-style menu on the wall give this place a real retro feel".

The shop appeared in the videogame The Getaway in 2002 and the movie Heart of Stone in 2023.

The Fryer's Delight also makes an appearance in an ident that has been used since 2018 for the British TV channel E4.

== See also ==
- List of fish and chip restaurants
