= List of fish and chip restaurants =

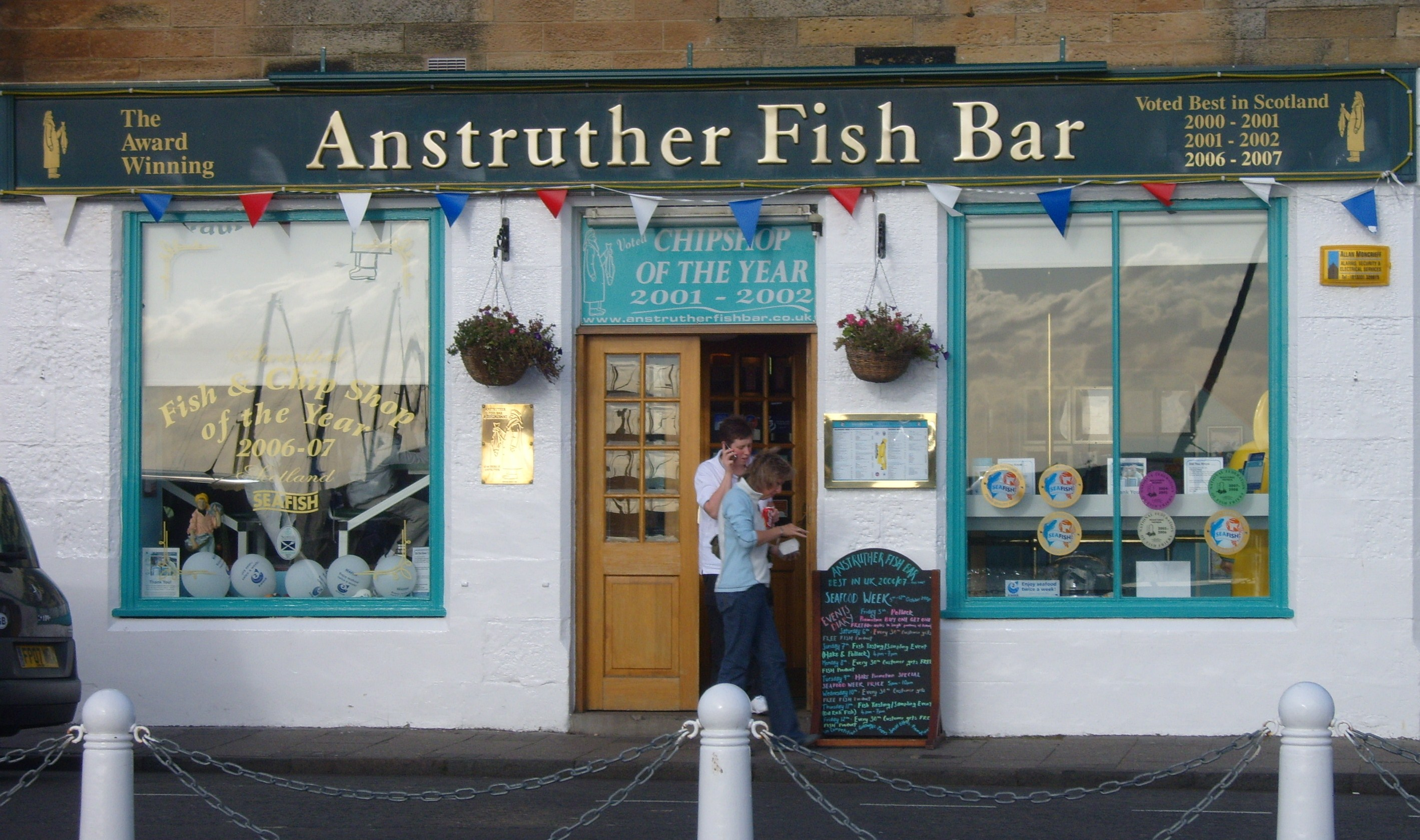
Anstruther Fish Bar

This is a list of notable fish and chip restaurants which are renowned for, or whose main dish is, fish and chips. Fish and chips is a hot dish of English origin, consisting of battered fish, commonly Atlantic cod or haddock and deep-fried chips. It is a common take-away food. A common side dish is mushy peas.

A fish and chip shop, colloquially known as a 'chippy' in the UK and 'chipper' in Ireland, is an outlet that predominantly sells the English dish of fish and chips. It is usually a takeaway operation, although some have limited seating facilities.

== Fish and chip restaurants ==
=== Australia ===
- Doyles on the Beach

=== Canada ===
- Joey's Seafood Restaurants, 44 locations, based in Alberta

=== Ireland ===
- Leo Burdock – Originally only located in the Christchurch area, now a Dublin chain of 'Chippers'.

=== United Kingdom ===
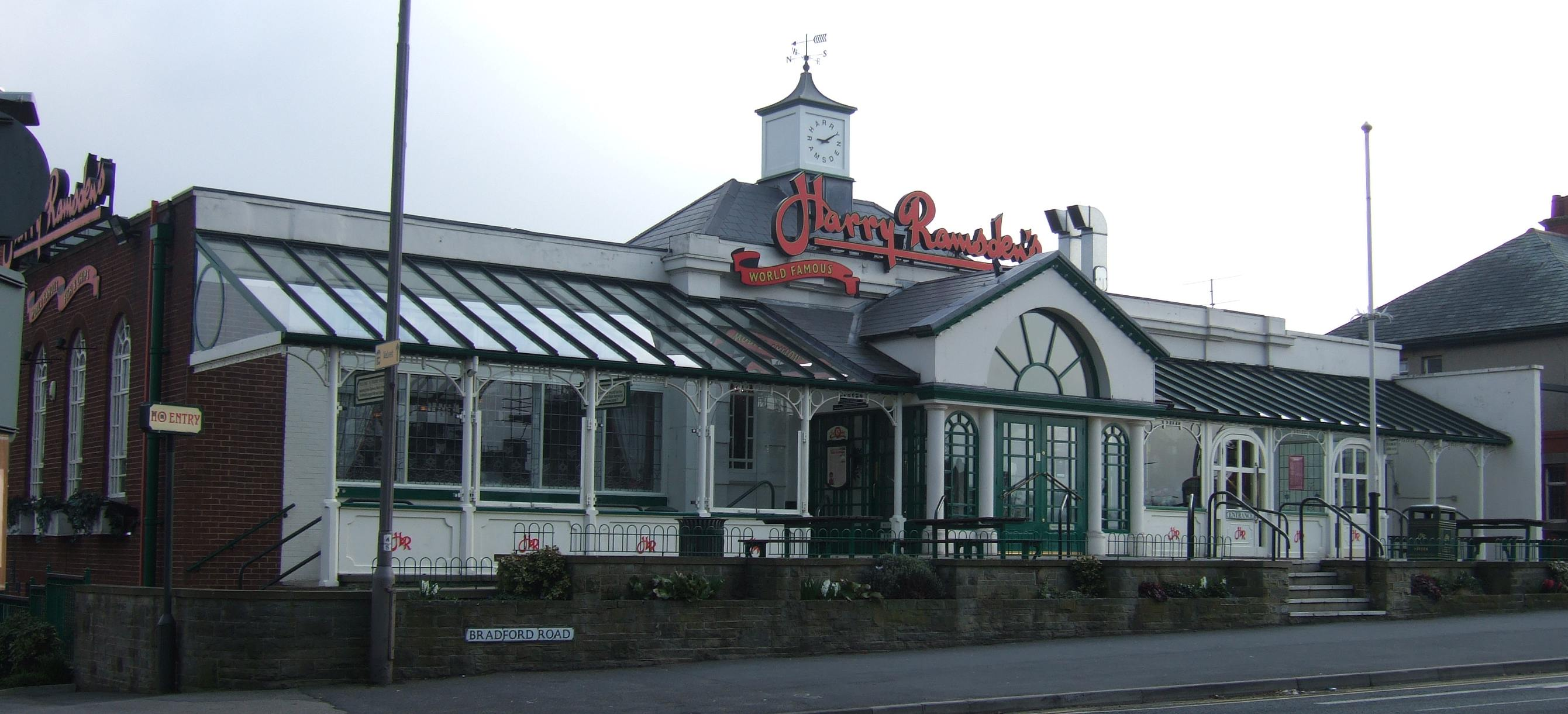
The Guiseley branch of Harry Ramsden's in 2007

- Anstruther Fish Bar – located in Anstruther, a fishing village in the East Neuk of Fife, Scotland
- The Ashvale – a chain of fish and chip restaurants and takeaways in the north-east of Scotland
- Binley Mega Chippy – a fish and chip restaurant located in Binley, Coventry that gained mass popularity after becoming viral on the social media platform TikTok in May 2022.
- The Fryer's Delight – a traditional cabbie's favourite in Theobald's Road, London
- Harry Ramsden's – a chain based in the United Kingdom which offers fish and chips and assorted themed dishes
- Magpie Café – located in Whitby, North Yorkshire, England, and established in 1937, but its building dated back to the 18th century, when it was a merchant's house
- Papa's Fish and Chips – Won a BBC contest, The Best of British Takeaways, in 2017. Papa's Fish and Chips in Cleethorpes is the world's second largest fish and chip shop with over 500 seats.
- Seashell of Lisson Grove – a standalone fish and chip restaurant located in Marylebone, London.

=== United States ===
- Arthur Treacher's – the first fish and chips fast food franchise in the country
- Batterfish – restaurant in Portland, Oregon (previously Los Angeles)
- Captain D's – a chain of fast-casual restaurants specializing in fish and chips and other seafood
- H. Salt Esquire – a California fast food chain that specializes in fish and chips
- Ivar's - a chain based in Seattle; some are full-service restaurants, some are stand-up bars, some are in malls, and some are fast-food restaurants
- Jackson's Catfish Corner in Seattle
- Long John Silver's – a fast food chain comparable to Arthur Treacher's
- Portland Fish Market in Portland, Oregon
- Skippers Seafood & Chowder House – a fast food chain based in Washington
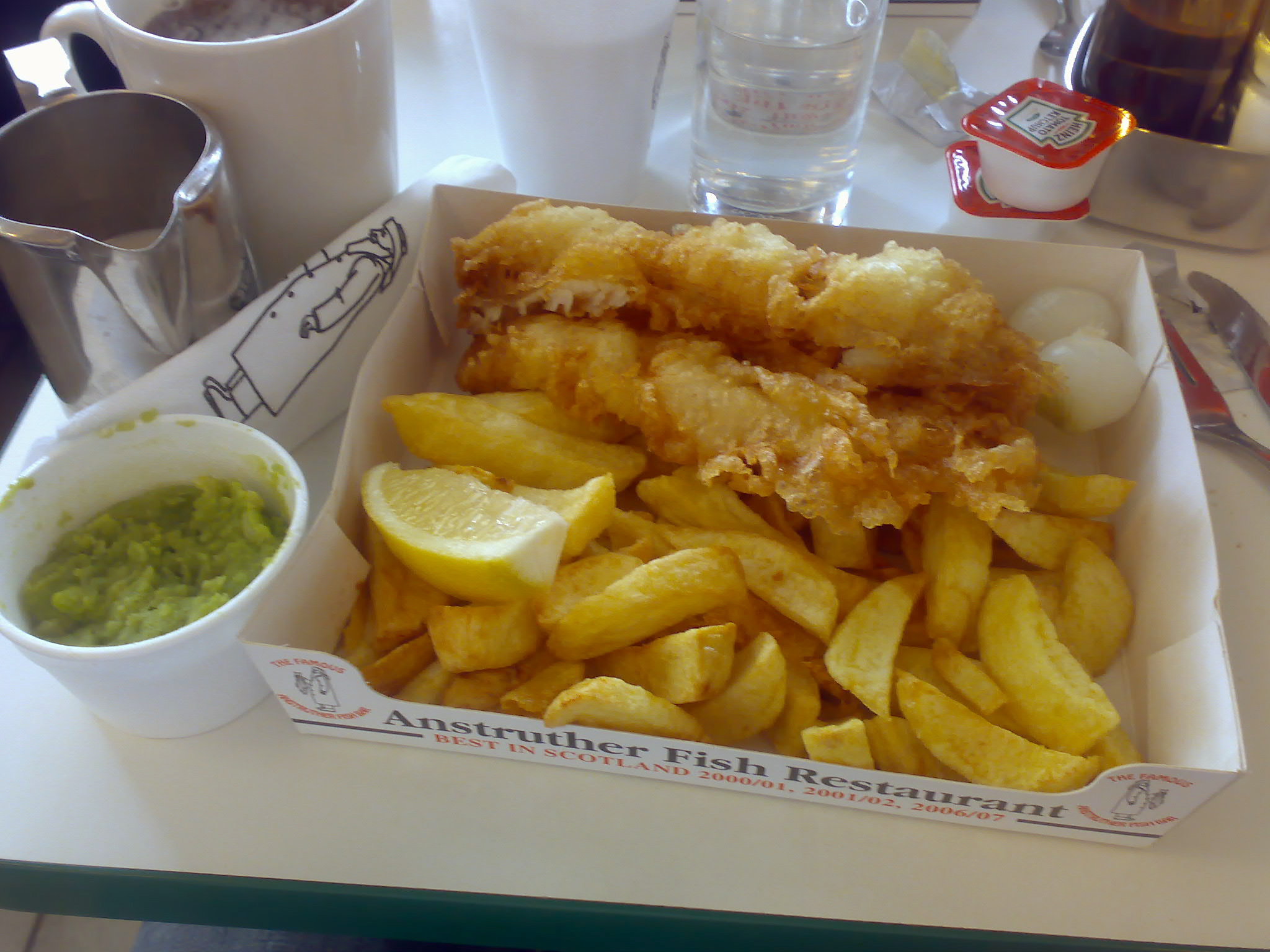
Fish and chips at Anstruther Fish Bar, with mushy peas

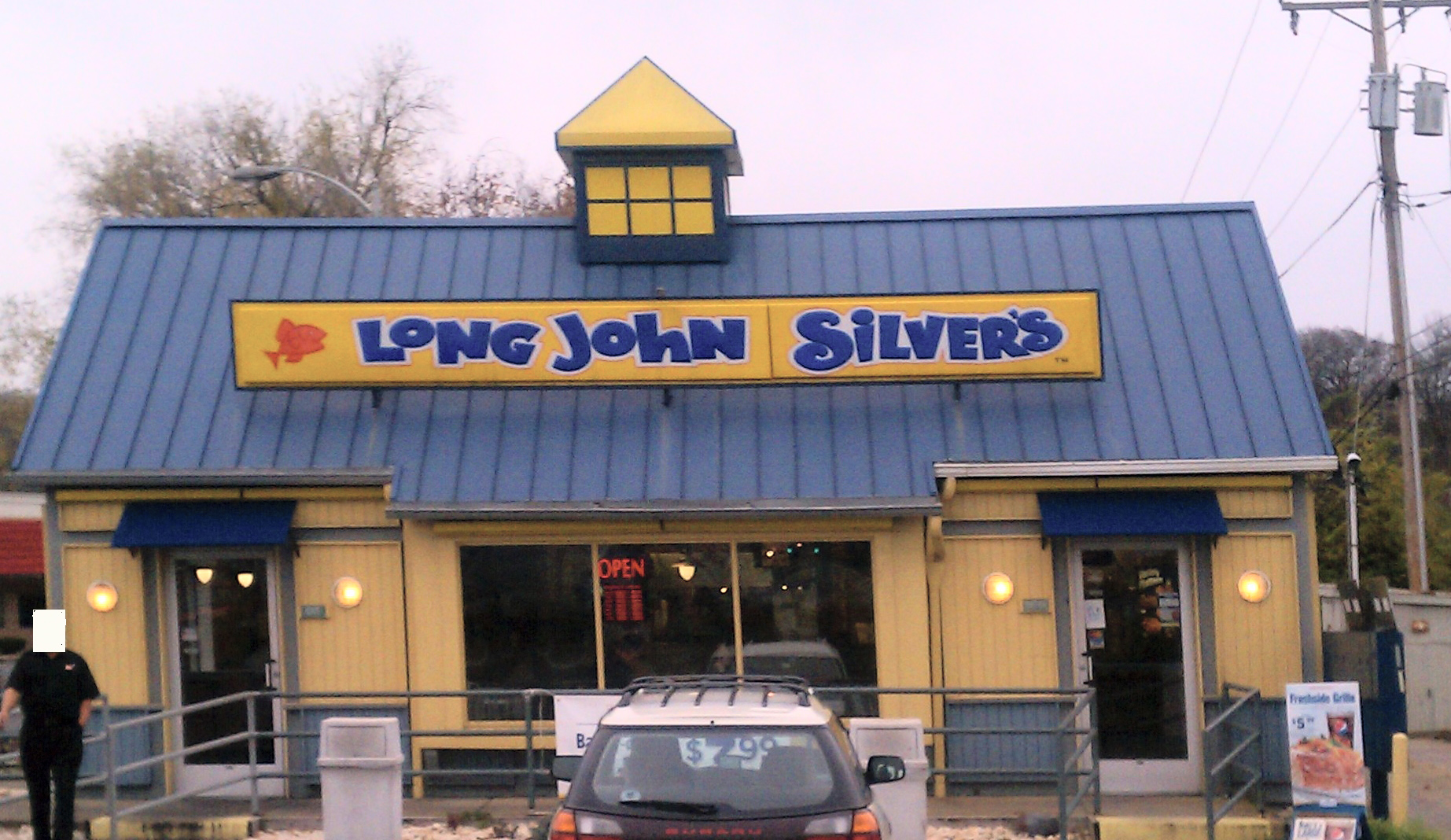
A Long John Silver's restaurant

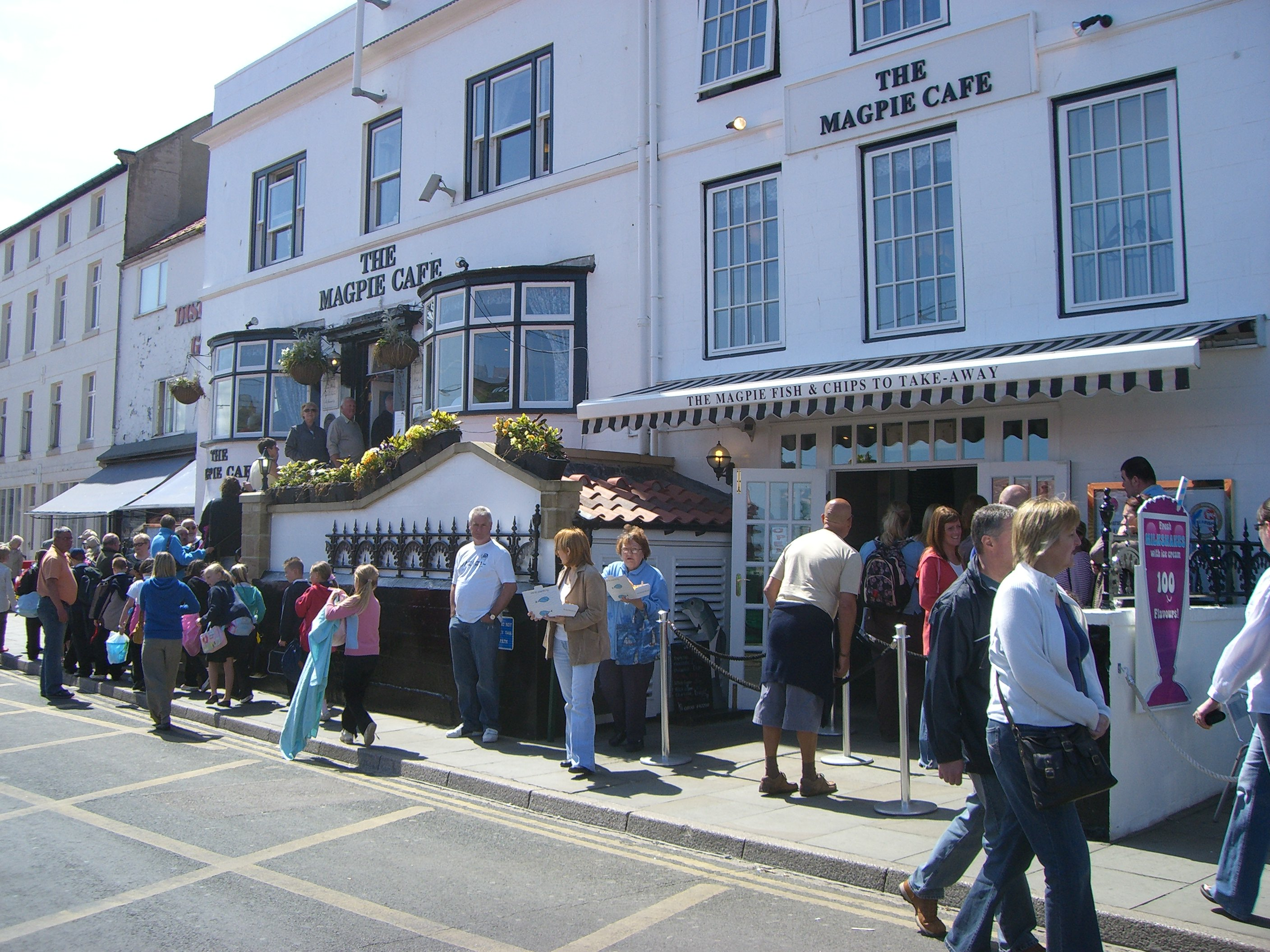
The Magpie Café

== See also ==
- List of seafood restaurants
- Lists of restaurants
- National Federation of Fish Friers
