= Seashell of Lisson Grove =

Fish and chips restaurant in London, England

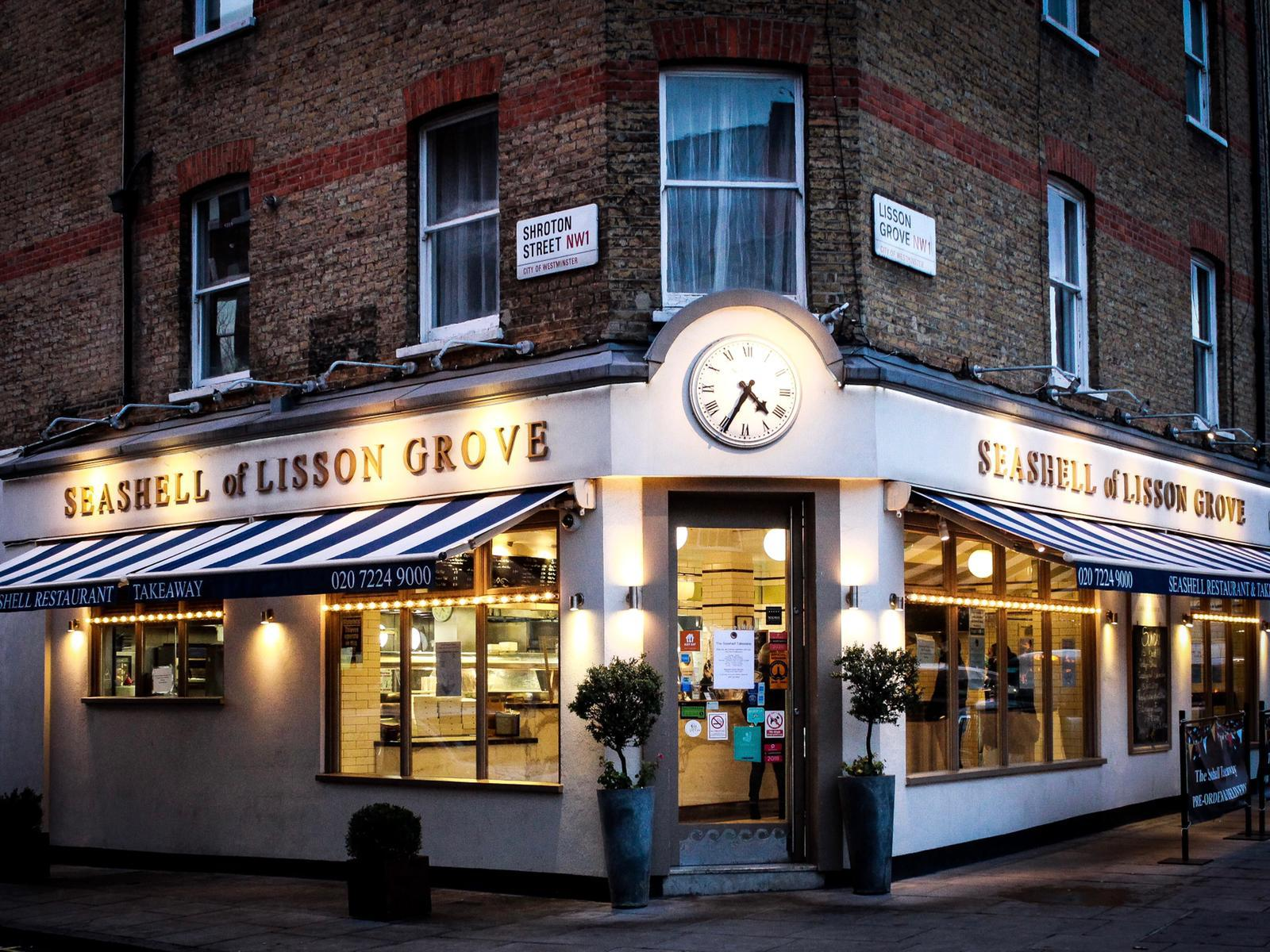
- The Seashell of Lisson Grove Restaurant and takeaway
- Headquarters: London, England
- Number of locations: Lisson Grove
- Products: Fish and chips
- Website: http://www.seashellrestaurant.co.uk/

Seashell of Lisson Grove is a fish and chip restaurant situated in Lisson Grove district of the City of Westminster The restaurant has a reputation for serving high quality fresh fish and locally sourced ingredients in both its restaurant and takeaway. It has frequently been voted one of the best places for fish and chips in London.

== History ==
One of the original fish and chip shops, a restaurant in Lisson Grove became a fish bar after the First World War. It was named the Sea Shell in 1964 and then expanded by John Faulkner in 1971.

A fire gutted the premises in 2009, leaving only the distinctive flooring behind, but it was reopened after refurbishment in 2010. The Seashell of Lisson Grove has grown to become one of the best known restaurants in the area, visited by local residents, celebrities and politicians.

== Reception ==
Celebrities who have eaten at the restaurant include Halle Berry, Danny DeVito, Ed Sheeran, Bill Nighy, Lady Gaga, Madonna, Dua Lipa, and seven time Michelin star chef Yoshihiro Murata.

== See also ==
- List of fish and chip restaurants
