= Cleethorpes Pier =

Pleasure pier in Lincolnshire, England

Coordinates: 53°33′40″N 0°01′36″W

- Cleethorpes Pier in 2026
- Type: Pleasure
- Carries: Pedestrians
- Location: Cleethorpes
- Owner: Papa's Fish and Chips

Characteristics
- Total length: 102 m (335 ft)

History
- Constructor: Head Wrightson
- Opening date: 4 August 1873; 153 years ago

Cleethorpes Pier is a pleasure pier in the town of Cleethorpes, North East Lincolnshire, England. It was opened in 1873 and was a much longer structure than at present. A mid-section was removed during World War II and the isolated seaward part later demolished.

== Structure ==
Originally 1,200 feet (370 m) in length to span the unusually large distance between low and high tide limits, the pier comprised a timber deck supported on iron piles. A landing stage was added in 1875, but was destroyed by fire in 1886. Rolled steel girders were used to strengthen the structure in 1897. Fearing German troops would make use of the pier for invasion during World War II, a section in the middle was demolished in 1940 and was not restored after the war ended.

== History ==
Plans for the pier first appeared in late 1866 in The London Gazette and construction was authorised by the Cleethorpes Promenade Pier Order 1867. The pier was built by Head Wrightson and declared open by local dignitary, Grant Thorold of Weelsby on August Bank Holiday, 1873. The Manchester, Sheffield and Lincolnshire Railway took on an annual lease in 1884 followed by full acquisition 20 years later.

The original pavilion was destroyed by fire in 1903 but in 1905 a new one was built, halfway along the pier, and also a cafeteria and shops at the entry from the promenade. The pavilion offered a venue for dances and concerts. Cleethorpes Borough Council assumed ownership of the pier in 1936, the year that the resort gained borough status.

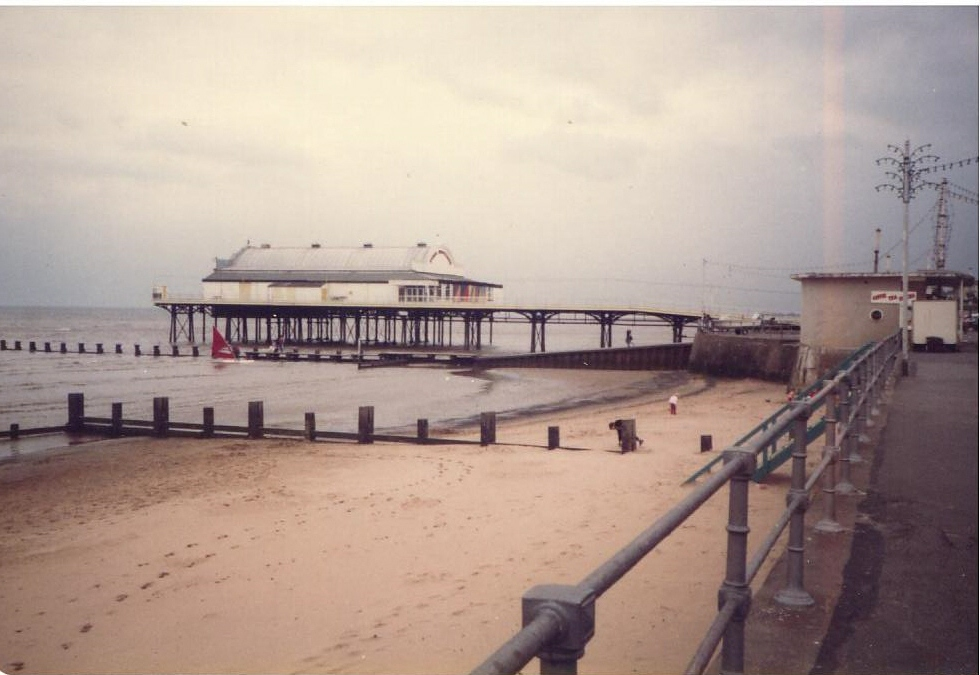
The pier as pictured in July 1983

In 1968. an investment of £50,000 (equivalent to £764,678 in 2025) modernised the 600-seat concert hall, cafe and bar. As well as traditional summer shows, it housed wrestling, coin & stamp fairs and dance festivals. However, after a series of losses on the summer show, the council sold the pier in 1981 to Funworld of Skegness, who later themselves put the pier up for sale. The council declined an offer to buy back the pier, saying it would need a £200,000 reconstruction. Following this, nightclub owner Mark Mayer purchased the pier for £10,000 and, after an investment of £300,000, it reopened as 'Pier 39' (a modern nightclub) on 4 September 1985; he later sold it for £1.2 million. Subsequent developments included a shelter for those awaiting access to the night-club, and pier widening with new underneath piles distinct from the originals.

=== 21st century ===
Cleethorpes Pier's owners from 2005 were those responsible for a management buyout from Luminar Leisure. In 2006 they rebuilt the former Paradise Club, with the new Waterfront Bar officially opened by Tim Mickleburgh, Hon Vice President of the National Piers Society.

The pier closed in 2010 but, in May 2010, a local businessman, Bryn Ilsey, bought the venue and leased it out. The Pier nightclub reopened to the public on 27 November 2010, after undergoing a £200,000 refurbishment, with day and night opening. It closed again on 2 September 2011 when the owners surrendered their licence to the authorities pending an investigation into a series of violent incidents and serious disorder.

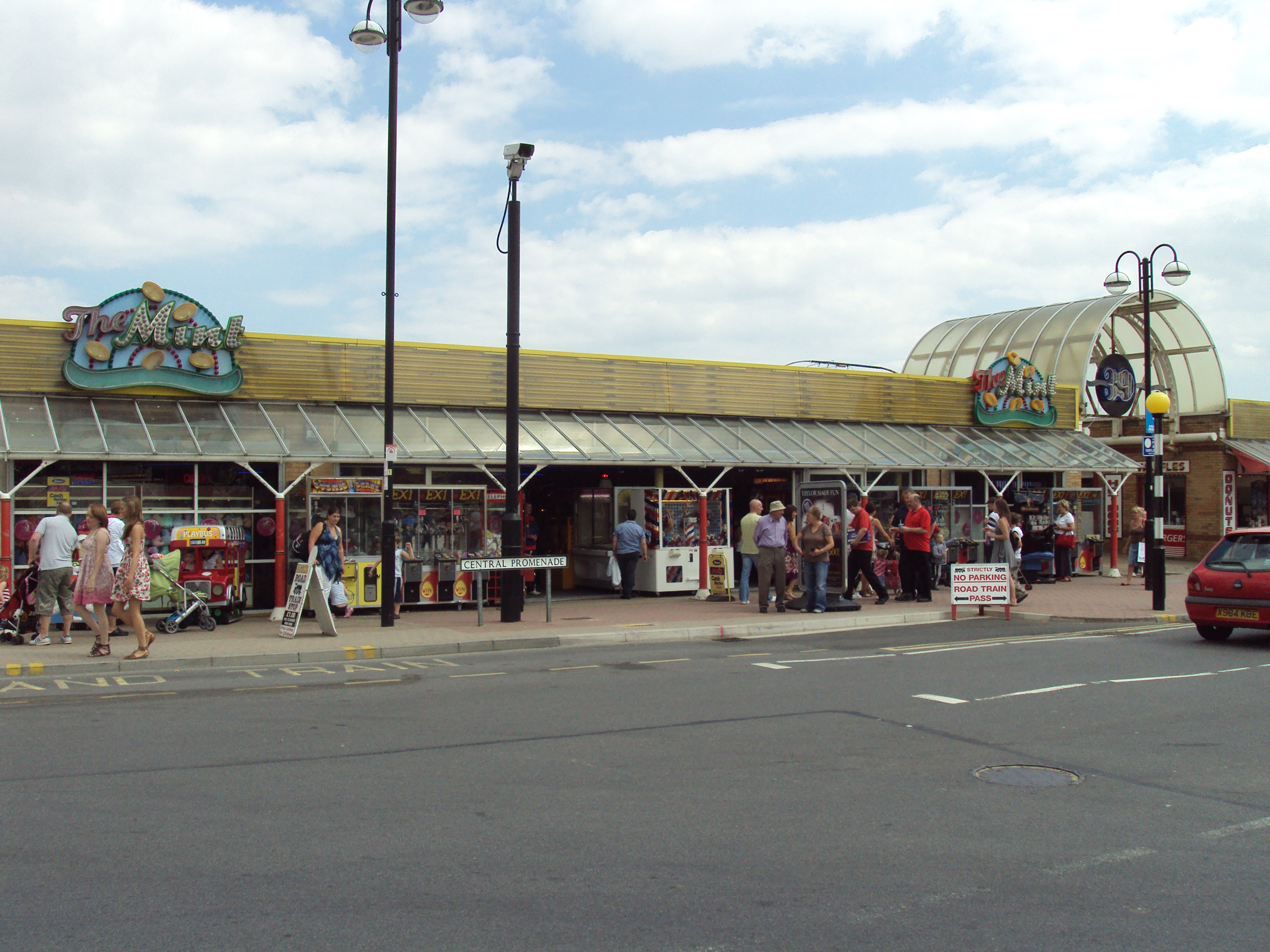
Frontage of the pier, pictured in July 2010

The pier re-opened on 1 December 2011 under the ownership of local businessman Alistair Clugston, with the front section being renamed the Tides Bar & Restaurant. The large hall continues as a nightclub, but with a 21-year age restriction.

The London Evening Standard for 12 December 2012 carried a half-page advertisement offering Cleethorpes Pier for sale by auction on 2 February 2013. At auction on the pier, it failed to reach its guide price of £400,000. However, a "venture partnership" had since purchased the pier for above the guide price and would take possession on 30 April 2013. In late May 2013 the pier was again on the market after the purchaser failed to meet the conditions of the sale. The owner said he was also willing to rent the pier to anyone interested.

In July 2013, local businessman Bryan Huxford purchased the pier for Community use and it has since re-opened to the public. Future plans for developing the structure were unveiled that November. The pier closed in late 2014 so that refurbishment could begin, but did not start until March 2015 with an expected re-opening date of July 2015.

The pier reopened in August 2015. The venue then held the 1873 restaurant offering fine dining, The Promenade, a public house that served traditional pub food and The Victoria Tea room for afternoon tea and dishes from a bistro menu. The historic venue also hosted live entertainment and held many functions and conferences ranging from weddings and birthday parties to corporate events.

In September 2016, the pier was again put up for sale, and was purchased by the Papa's Fish and Chips chain for an undisclosed fee in December 2016. It then re-opened in time for the 2017 season, when it claimed to be the largest fish and chip restaurant in the country.

== See also ==
- List of piers in the United Kingdom

Awards and achievements
Preceded by Cromer Pier	National Piers Society; Pier of the Year; 2016	Succeeded by Hastings Pier
