= Harringay Online =

Hyperlocal social network

Harringay Online is a hyperlocal social network based in the neighbourhood of Harringay, north London.

== History ==
Harringay Online

Started on 1 July 2007, Harringay Online was one of the first neighbourhood websites to be set up using social media technology. It was established with the stated aim of strengthening the community in the neighbourhood of Harringay in the north London Borough of Haringey. The site aims to achieve a blend of web-based and real world neighbourhood interactions.

Harringay Online explains its aims as achieving four main outcomes:

- Building a sense of place in a neighbourhood – an understanding and appreciation of the neighbourhood to encourage a feeling of belonging and regarding a place as home.
- Building social capital in the neighbourhood – building networks, norms and trust that enable people to act together more effectively to pursue shared objectives – simply put building community spirit or neighbourliness.
- Empowering local people to take action to shape their neighbourhood – working to improve local people's ability to influence local decisions and affect local circumstances.
- Engaging people in local democratic processes.

The site's main structure is:

- Main Page - summarising and linking to all content.
- Forum - for discussions on local and sometimes non-local issues.
- Gallery - pictures & videos including an extensive series of film footage and photos on Harringay's history.
- Local Information - a wide range of local links and information including weekly updates.
- Events - calendar of local events.
- Local History - a well-established local history resources including thoroughly researched articles in the History Group, an extensive gallery of images and posts on history in the forum
- Special Interest groups, including Gardening and a very authoritative

The site is a well used local site and receives between 1500 and 3000 unique users per day. An email update is circulated weekly to all members.

Harringay Online is regularly referenced around the world as an exemplary, community-led, hyperlocal website, being referred to recently by Urban Initiatives as "the gold standard for community websites". It has been recognised by two national awards and was awarded a Judge's Special Commendation by the Prime Minister in the UK's 2008 Catalyst Awards. In June 2009 it was highly commended in the National eWell-Being Awards.

In 2010 it was a focus for the UK-based study on local websites, the Online Neighbourhood Networks Study

With a stated target population of 22,500, by 2018, it had signed over 12,500 members.

== References & notes ==
General

- Referenced in Joining the Conversation: a guide to neighbourhood media, a paper jointly published by the Young Foundation, IDeA and the Local Government Association.
- Section on Harringay Online in Promising Practices In Online Engagement by Public Agenda.
- Referenced in Making The Connection report from the Carnegie Trust
- In Local by Social publication by IDeA
- Harringay Online in the Online Neighbourhood Networks Study
- Harringay Online on BBC London News
- Harringay Online on BBC Technology
- In The Guardian Social media can help riot-hit communities recover
- "Blueprint for future needs to address loneliness, says report". The Sydney Morning Herald.
- Referenced in The Connected Community:Local Governments as Partners in Citizen Engagement and Community Building, Arizona State University (pp 80-85
- Harringay Online on the European Union's best practice website
- Harringay Online used by Smithsonian as an archive resource
- Harringay Online used as a reference source by the Library of Congress
- Referenced in NESTA's report on UK Hyperlocal media Here and Now
