= Fish n' Chips (film) =

2011 film

- Poster
- Directed by: Elias Demetriou
- Written by: Elias Demetriou
- Produced by: Elias Demetriou; Moriatis Konstantinos; Monica Nicolaidou; George Pantzis
- Starring: Marios Ioannou; Marlene Kaminsky; Anne-Marie O'Sullivan; Jimmy Pantzis; Diomedes Koufteros
- Cinematography: Yorgos Giannelis
- Edited by: Elias Demetriou; Ioanna Spiliopoulou
- Music by: Christina Georgiou
- Production companies: Ammos Films; Film Blades; Pan Entertainment; Solution Film
- Distributed by: Film Blades (Cyprus); Pan Entertainment (Greece)
- Release date: 23 August 2011 (Montreal)
- Running time: 102 minutes
- Countries: Cyprus; Greece; United Kingdom
- Languages: Greek; English

Fish n' Chips is a 2011 British-Cypriot comedy-drama film written, directed, co-produced, and co-edited by Elias Demetriou. It stars Marios Ioannou as a Greek-Cypriot immigrant in London who decides to open his own fish and chip shop in Cyprus, only for his life to subsequently fall apart around him.

== Plot ==
Greek-Cypriot immigrant Andy works at a fish and chip shop in London with his German girlfriend Karin and her daughter Emma, under the watchful eye of his Turkish-Cypriot boss Hassan, who prefers to be called Jimmy. Andy's elderly mother has dementia and is causing him a lot of trouble as she often runs away, imagining that she is returning to her homeland. Andy finds the perfect excuse to take his mother to Cyprus and offer Karin and Emma some rest and relaxation at the same time. Jimmy has different ideas, since he depends heavily on Andy's skill and phenomenal output; the two men argue and Jimmy fires Andy and Karin.

Andy, who has already made up his mind to propose to Karin, decides not to tell her that they have lost their jobs. They travel to Cyprus for their holiday, staying with Andy's brother Anestis and his family. Andy, seeing how much Karin and Emma are enjoying Cyprus, persuades them to join him in opening a fish and chip shop there. The business collapses when Andy realises that he failed to account for the fact that the beach where Anestis convinced him to open his shop is mostly frequented by Cypriots, who are not big consumers of fish and chips.

The failure brings misery and creates conflict between Andy and Anestis, as well as between Karin and Emma. Andy refuses to face reality and attempts to keep the shop going, resulting in Karin and Emma returning to London to seek out their previous jobs with Jimmy. Andy's mother, who keeps running away from him and searching for her own homeland despite being in Cyprus, manages to get inside her own house in Northern Cyprus; Andy finds out that the house, which is now owned by a retired old British woman, was sold by Anestis behind his back.

Andy later discovers that his father was not killed by the Turks during the war, as he always believed, but that his real father is Jimmy. The hidden love story between his mother and Jimmy forces him to address his bigoted views of Turkish-Cypriots. Realising that he is nothing more than a tourist in his own country, and that home is where a person fits best, Andy returns to London to find that Jimmy is planning to retire and give him ownership of the fish shop.

== Cast ==
- Marios Ioannou as Andy
- Marlene Kaminsky as Karin
- Anne-Marie O'Sullivan as Emma
- Jimmy Pantzis as Jimmy
- Diomedes Koufteros as Anestis
- Alkistis Pavlidou as Mother
- Margarita Zachariou as Maria
- Stephanie Neofytoy as Anna
- Andreas Phylactou as Yorgos
- Roland Manookian as Dave
