= Anstruther Fish Bar =

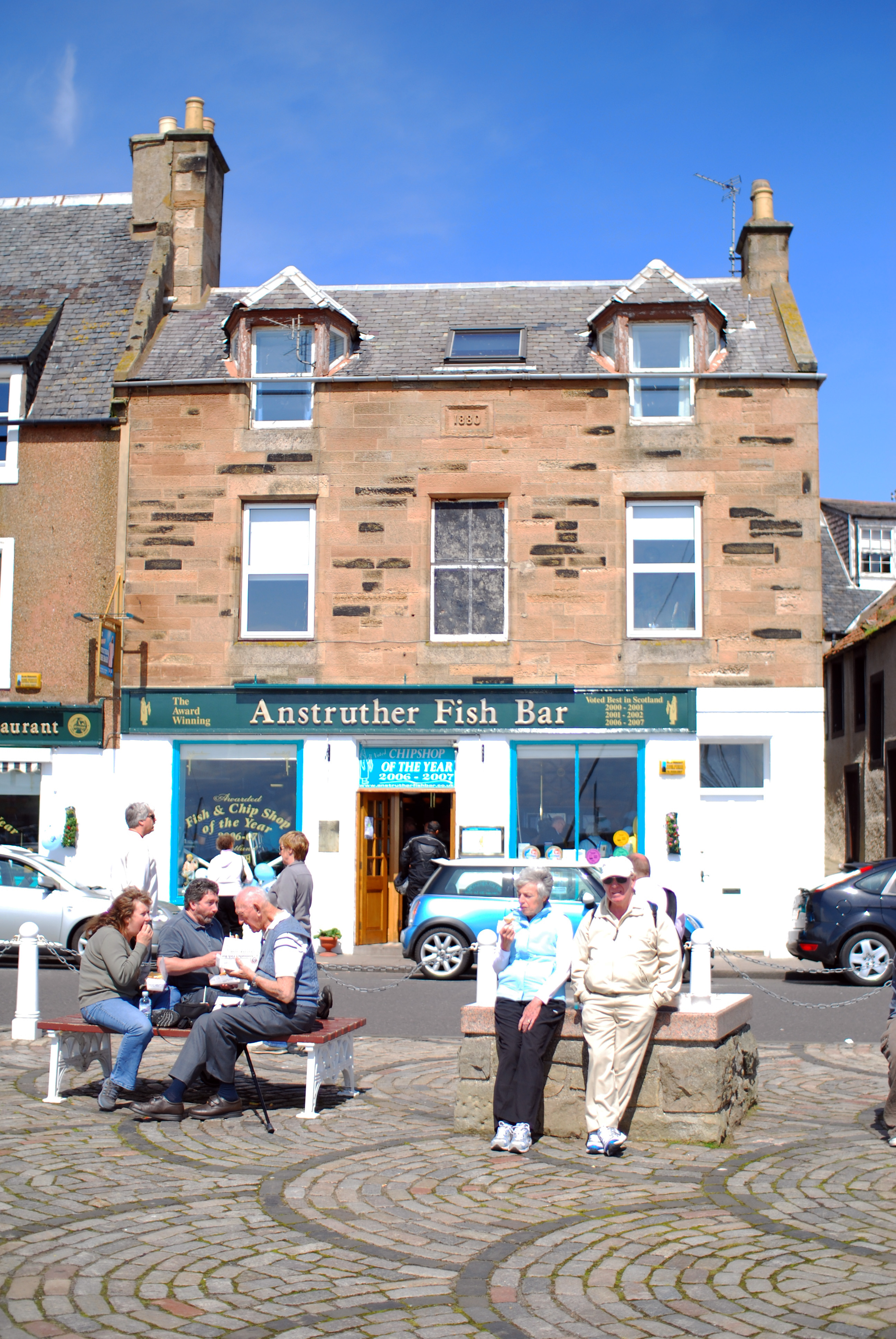
- Anstruther Fish Bar in 2008
- Interactive map of Anstruther Fish Bar

Restaurant information
- Location: Anstruther, United Kingdom
- Coordinates: 56°13′20″N 2°41′53″W
- Website: www.anstrutherfishbar.co.uk

The Anstruther Fish Bar is a fish and chip shop in Anstruther, a fishing village in the East Neuk of Fife, Scotland.

== History ==
The Bar is situated on Shore Street, the harbour front in Anstruther, and is particularly popular with tourists. It sells take-away fish and chips, which are often consumed at the public seating area opposite the shop, where local fishermen land crab and lobster. Unlike many Scottish fish and chip shops, it also has a restaurant; the Bar is nautically themed with 52 seats and views over the Firth of Forth. It also hosts an ice cream parlour and sweet shop and employs over fifty staff. The most popular order is haddock and chips although hake, halibut and lemon sole are also served.

It has served Prince William, Tom Hanks and Robert De Niro.

Since 2003, the shop has been operated by Argo Fish, a small local firm owned by Robert and Alison Smith of St Monans, Fife. The owners work "hands on" in the restaurant, employing their two sons and almost 60 staff.

== Awards ==
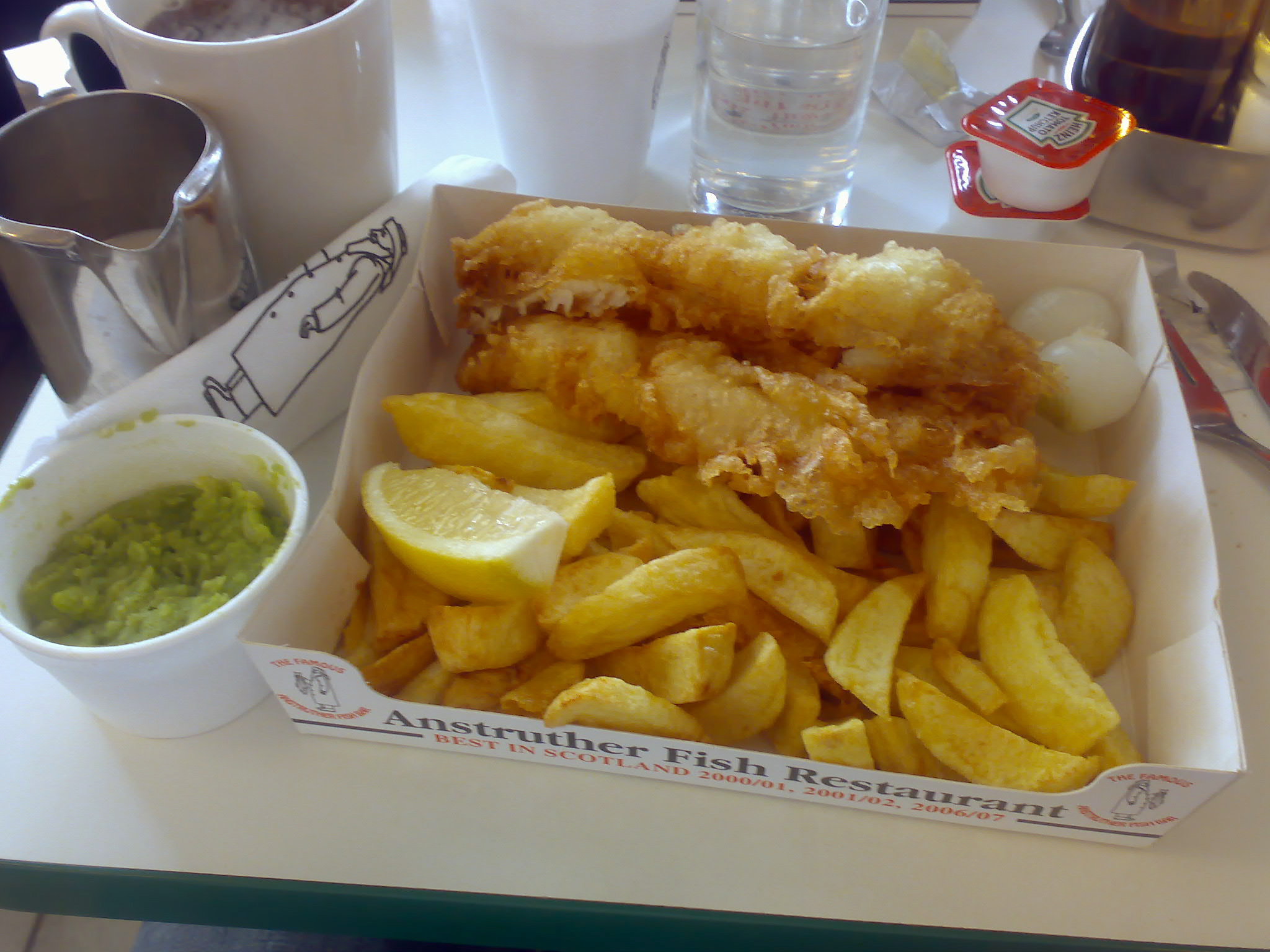
Mushy peas are a speciality

The Anstruther Fish Bar has won the ‘Best Fish and Chip Shop’ in Scotland accolade on four occasions. It was also named ‘Café of the Year 2005’ for Scotland by Les Routiers and won the Seafish Friers Award for Excellence every year between 1996 and 2006. In 2007, it was second in the U.K. 'Fish Shop of the Year' competition, described by the owner as "the Oscars" of the industry. In 2009 it finally won the competition, beating 1,000 competitors to become UK Fish & Chip Shop of the Year. Alison Smith, the owner, said: "Claiming the national title has always been our ambition, it's the ultimate goal in our industry. The title is a great reward for our hard-working staff and a great way of reminding our customers and fans throughout the UK where to buy the best fish and chips."

In 2007, it was one of the six Scottish finalist in UKTV Food's "Local Food Hero", assessed by celebrity chef Gary Rhodes. The Anstruther Fish Bar has also featured in national television programmes such as 'Scottish Passport', 'The Holiday Programme', 'Scotland's Larder' as well as BBC Radio Scotland. It has also enjoyed international recognition. In 2004, 'Talking Island Productions' produced a feature on the business for Japanese television, and part of an episode of 'The Wandering Golfer' for 'The Fine Living Channel' (USA) was filmed from the kitchen and restaurant of the Fish Bar. It also featured in American Magazine Bon Appetit.

== See also ==
- List of fish and chip restaurants
- List of seafood restaurants
