= Olivewood =

Cypriot movie nickname

Olivewood is a marketing term used in efforts of Cyprus to brand as a movie production destination. The term is a portmanteau of "Olive" and "Hollywood".

== History ==
Cyprus film production dates back to the 1950s, soon after World War II, with They Who Dare (1954) as the first film noted as being filmed on location in Cyprus on IMDb. Productions since the 1950s include action, comedy, sci-fi, romance, drama and melodrama along with notable documentaries from the BBC and National Geographic.

== Climate ==
Cypriot climate is predictable and a key advantage for film production (340 days of sunshine year round).

== Locations ==
The island has a diverse set of film locations and dissimilar climates. Locations range from archaeological sites to antiquated villages, Greek amphitheatres, and modern European cities such as Limassol.

== Inter-connectivity ==
The Republic has two deep-sea ports (Limassol and Larnaca) and two international airports (Larnaca and Paphos).

== Shooting Permits ==
Shooting Permits is a requirement for most purposes. Film Producers must liaison with the key Government Agencies depending on the necessity:

- Department of Civil Aviation
- Deputy Ministry of Tourism
- Department of Antiquities
- Ministry of Health
- National Guard
- Cyprus Police

== Incentives ==
An incentive scheme was introduced in 2018 to encourage more international productions. S.O.S: Survive Or Sacrifice featuring William Baldwin was the first film to take advantage of the Olivewood incentive plan.

== See also ==
- Cinema of Cyprus
- Cyprus International Film Festival
