= Magpie Café =

Seafood restaurant in Whitby, North Yorkshire, England

The Magpie Café
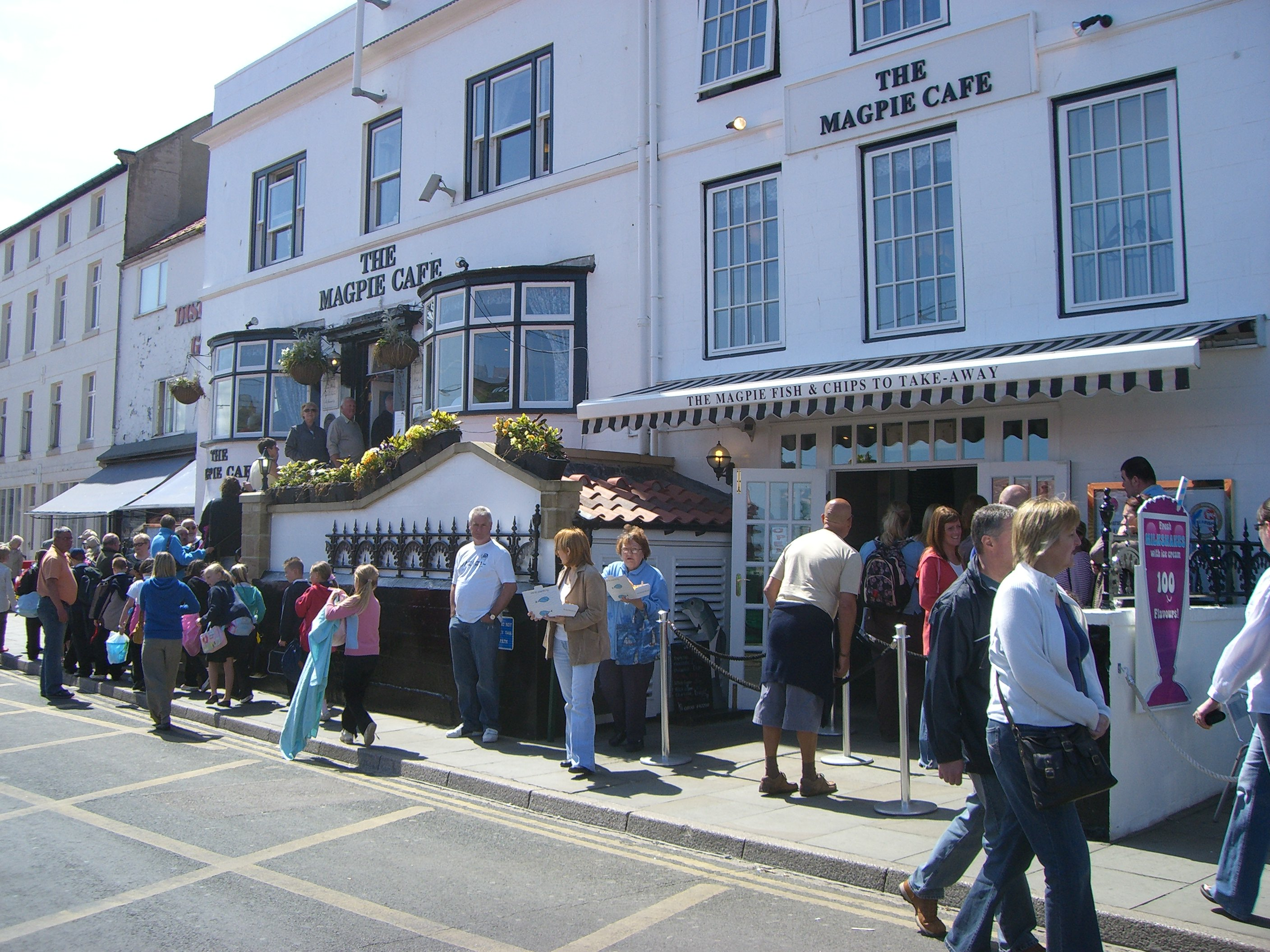
- Interactive map of The Magpie Café

Restaurant information
- Established: 1937; 89 years ago
- Food type: Seafood (fish and chips)
- Location: 14 Pier Road, Whitby, North Yorkshire, YO21 3PU, England
- Coordinates: 54.489199°N 0.614917°W
- Website: http://www.magpiecafe.co.uk

The Magpie Café is a seafood restaurant in Whitby, North Yorkshire, England. It was established in 1937, but its building dates back to the 18th century, when it was a merchant's house.

== Profile ==
The Magpie Café was founded in 1937. Ian Robson, the current owner, began working there as a fish fryer in 1979.

The restaurant is known for its fish and chips, and has been described as a "bloody good fish and chip shop". The restaurant won a Coast Award for being best fish and chip shop of 2007. The restaurant has faced complaints from local businesses for its long queues. It sources its fish from the local Fishery Lockers Fish.

In 2023, the Magpie was rated 10/10 by British YouTuber Danny Malin host of Rate My Takeaway.

=== Fires ===
Two fires in the space of 24 hours caused the Magpie Café to close for repairs in May 2017, reopening in December 2017. The first fire started at 10 pm on 30 April 2017, seven fire engines attended. It was likely caused by a grease build up in an electrical extraction flue in the roof, it damaged the top floor customer toilets. The second fire started at 2:30 pm, this time completely gutted the restaurant roof and lower floors except the kitchen and take away shop. The cause was likely pointed to burning embers not extinguished the day before. In July 2017, a major repair began to rebuild the restaurant before it reopened in December that same year.

== See also ==
- List of fish and chip restaurants
- List of seafood restaurants
