= Cyprus Comic Con =

Annual pop-culture convention in Nicosia, Cyprus

- Status: Active
- Genre: Multi-genre
- Venue: Cyprus State Fairgrounds
- Location: Nicosia
- Country: Cyprus
- Inaugurated: 13 September 2014; 12 years ago
- Attendance: More than 32,000 (2025)
- Website: cypruscomiccon.org

Cyprus Comic Con (CCC) is an annual fan convention held in Nicosia, Cyprus. Established in 2014, the convention covers comic books, video games, cosplay, anime, film, television, science fiction, fantasy and other aspects of popular culture. Its programme has included artists' and vendors' areas, gaming tournaments, cosplay competitions, film screenings, panels, workshops, live music and appearances by international guests.

The first convention was held at European University Cyprus in September 2014. It later moved to the Filoxenia Conference Centre and, from 2017, to the Cyprus State Fairgrounds. Reported attendance increased from approximately 4,000 people at the inaugural convention to more than 32,000 in 2025.

== History ==
The first Cyprus Comic Con took place on 13 September 2014 at European University Cyprus in Nicosia. Organisers had initially anticipated several hundred visitors, but the event attracted approximately 4,000 people. The convention moved to the larger Filoxenia Conference Centre in 2015, when attendance was reported at approximately 8,000.

The 2016 convention expanded into a two-day event. It attracted 13,800 visitors to the Filoxenia Conference Centre over 3 and 4 September. In 2017, the convention moved to the Cyprus State Fairgrounds, using several exhibition halls for gaming, artists, retail, panels, cosplay and film screenings. Approximately 15,000 people attended that edition.

No main convention was held in 2018. Cyprus Comic Con returned to the State Fairgrounds in April 2019, with organisers expecting approximately 17,000 visitors. Contemporary and later reporting described the event as having attracted close to 20,000 people.

The convention did not hold its main event between 2020 and 2022. It returned on 7 and 8 October 2023 at the State Fairgrounds, with expanded areas for independent artists, esports, tabletop gaming, cosplay, retail, live entertainment and historical reenactment.

In 2024, the convention recorded approximately 22,000 ticketed attendees and more than 30,000 visitors overall. According to Politis, approximately seven per cent of ticketed attendees had travelled to Cyprus from abroad. Attendance exceeded 32,000 in 2025, when the event supported hundreds of vendors and creative exhibitors.

== Programme ==
Cyprus Comic Con is organised as a multi-genre event rather than solely as a comic-book exhibition. Its programme has included an Artists' Alley for illustrators, writers and other independent creators; retail and collectors' areas; video-game and esports competitions; tabletop and trading-card gaming; cosplay competitions; workshops and discussion panels; and a short-film festival with local and international sections.

Outdoor programming has included live music, food vendors, professional wrestling, archery, live-action role-playing and medieval martial-arts or reenactment groups. The convention's cosplay competition has also been used to select Cypriot representatives for international cosplay competitions.

Guests covered by independent media have included actor and strongman Hafþór Júlíus Björnsson in 2017; Anthony Daniels, Eugene Simon and Ross Mullan in 2019; and Tom Wlaschiha, Miltos Yerolemou and sculptor Brian Muir in 2023.

== Organisation and cultural role ==
The convention was established by Christopher Barnett, Christos Ellinas, Helen Christofi, Neo Barnett and Peter Anders Hvass. Coverage of the 2017 and 2019 editions described Cyprus Comic Con as a non-profit, volunteer-run event whose revenue was reinvested into organising subsequent conventions.

Politis has described the convention as contributing to the greater visibility and acceptance of cosplay, gaming, anime and related subcultures in Cyprus. The publication also identified the convention as a platform through which local artists and other creative professionals can present their work alongside international guests.

== See also ==
- Comic book convention
- Fan convention
- Cosplay
- Multigenre convention
