= Improvement and Development Agency for local government =

The Improvement and Development Agency for local government (usually shortened to IDeA) is a legal entity within the Local Government Association responsible for providing improvement support to local authorities in England.

== Brief history ==
The body was formed in 1998 to work in partnership with all councils in England and Wales, to serve people and places better, to enhance the performance of the best local government authorities, accelerate the speed of improvement of the rest, and develop the sector as a whole. Improvement functions for Welsh councils passed to the Welsh Government on devolution.

It was renamed to "Local Government Improvement and Development" in July 2010 along with other members of the Local Government Group as part of the latter's 'Getting Closer' initiative. In 2012 the LGID "brand" was retired and the organisation's functions were delivered using the branding of the Local Government Association although the IDeA remains legally separate, with a separate Board.

== Initiatives ==
The IDeA also promotes the development of local government’s management and workforce. We advise councils on improving customer service and value for money. And we help councils work through local partnerships to tackle difficult problems such as crime and poor public health.

The IDeA is a member of the LGA group, which comprises five partner organisations who work together to support, promote and improve local government.

== Funding ==
It is funded by way of an "improvement services grant" provided by the Ministry of Housing, Communities and Local Government. This replaced a topsliced component of the previous Revenue Support Grant payment from the UK government. The IDeA remains legally separate from the rest of the LGA, which is a membership organisation for English councils, in order to provide assurance and accountability for services delivered under the grant.
