= The Man with the Answers =

2021 film directed by Stelios Kammitsis

- Greek: Ο άνθρωπος με τις απαντήσεις
- Directed by: Stelios Kammitsis
- Written by: Stelios Kammitsis
- Produced by: Fenia Cossovitsa; Luca Legnani; Vicky Miha
- Starring: Vasilis Magouliotis; Anton Weil; Stella Fyrogeni; Marc Pistono
- Cinematography: Thodoros Mihopoulos
- Edited by: Livia Neroutsopoulou
- Music by: Francesco Cerasi
- Production companies: Felony Productions; Blonde Audiovisual Productions; Asterisk; 9.99 Films; Apulia Film Commission; Greek Film Centre; Alto Adige Film Fund
- Distributed by: Cinobo (Greece); Peccadillo Pictures (UK, Ireland); Artsploitation Films (Canada, U.S.); Optimale (France); Edition Salzgeber (Germany); Tongariro Releasing (Poland); Edko Films (Japan); Elite Filmes (Brazil); Joint Entertainment International (Taiwan)
- Release date: 20 July 2021
- Running time: 81 minutes
- Countries: Greece; Cyprus; Italy
- Languages: English; German; Greek; Italian

The Man with the Answers (Greek: Ο άνθρωπος με τις απαντήσεις) is a 2021 romantic drama road film written and directed by Stelios Kammitsis. It stars Vasilis Magouliotis as a Greek man who takes a road trip to Germany and Anton Weil as the hitchhiking German student he picks up and falls in love with. The film is an international co-production between Greece, Cyprus, and Italy.

== Plot ==
Victoras is a Greek former diving champion who now works at a furniture factory and lives with his sick grandmother by the sea in Greece. Distraught after her death, he decides to dust off her old car and take a road trip to Germany, where his estranged mother lives in Bavaria. On the ferry to Italy, he meets carefree and eccentric German student Matthias, who is on his way home. Matthias persuades Victoras to let him join his road trip. As they drive, the uptight and repressed Victoras clashes with the more free-spirited Matthias, but they soon find common emotional ground as their summer road trip takes unexpected turns and they find themselves falling in love with each other.

== Cast ==
- Vasilis Magouliotis as Victoras
- Anton Weil as Mathias
- Stella Fyrogeni as Angeliki
- Marc Pistono as Patrick
