= Find Me Falling =

2024 film by Stelana Kliris

- Release poster
- Directed by: Stelana Kliris
- Written by: Stelana Kliris
- Produced by: Steven Shapiro; Keith Arnold; Stelana Kliris
- Starring: Harry Connick Jr.; Agni Scott; Ali Fumiko Whitney; Clarence Smith
- Cinematography: Stephan Metzner
- Edited by: Emilios Avraam
- Music by: Carlos José Alvarez
- Production companies: Jupiter Peak Productions; Meraki Films
- Distributed by: Netflix
- Release date: July 19, 2024
- Running time: 94 minutes
- Countries: Cyprus; United States
- Languages: English; Greek (Cypriot)

Find Me Falling is a 2024 romantic comedy film written and directed by Stelana Kliris. It stars Harry Connick Jr. and the cast also includes Agni Scott, Ali Fumiko Whitney, and Clarence Smith.

American rock star John Allman, frustrated by an unsuccessful album, takes a break from his career to live in a remote house near a cliff in Cyprus, which he discovers is a suicide hotspot. There, he reconnects with old flame Sia, uncovering a long-guarded secret.

The film was released by Netflix on July 19, 2024. It received mixed reviews.

== Plot ==
After his latest album is poorly received, American rock star John Allman spontaneously moves to Cyprus. Buying a remote house on a cliff, a few days later, he witnesses a man commit suicide jumping off it. Local police captain Manoli explains the cliff is a well-known suicide hotspot, which explains why the house was so inexpensive. Warned that the suicide rate can be very high, he is given Manoli's phone number to report future instances.

John goes into town and asks for home grocery delivery, surprising the shop owner when he says which house he bought. The next day, shop girl Melina delivers John's food. She recognizes John as a famous musician, and he explains he has moved to Cyprus to escape his life. He later calls his manager Jimmy to reveal where he is.

When the mother of the man who jumped comes to the cliff, John calls Manoli. Later, the captain invites him to the tavern in town. There, they hear Melina sing, and Manoli suggests John would be a good match for his sister.

John is then introduced to a table of locals, including Sia, a woman he knew in Cyprus many years ago, although they both pretend not to know the other. The others recognize John the rock star and mention his most famous song, which is about falling in love. Although the song was about Sia, he insists it was not inspired by a real person, and leaves.

Sia follows John out, and he confronts her about pretending not to know him. She asks him why he is back in Cyprus, but he does not know how to answer, and they suddenly share a passionate kiss. Sia spends the night at John's, sneaking out in the morning.

John calls Sia and convinces her to return for dinner that evening. When Melina delivers John's groceries, he asks her to help cook dinner. Sia arrives early and finds John getting dressed while a woman is in the kitchen. She assumes he is 'entertaining' someone else, but when Melina walks out, it is revealed that she is Sia's daughter. Manoli's sister then arrives inadvertently for a date, so Sia assumes he is a womanizer, and storms out.

It is revealed that John and Sia wanted to be together, but she was scared off by his career. She was pregnant with Melina at the time, but raised her letting her believe her father was a passing tourist. She had gone to NYC to tell John of the pregnancy, but his sudden fame scared her off.

Later, at the tavern, Melina invites John to sing his song with her. He starts to, then drunkenly adds more lyrics revealing he is Melina's dad and that Sia never told him about her. Melina storms out, angry at her mom, and Sia follows, angry at John. Melina is later persuaded by her grandmother to forgive Sia.

John plays a new song of his for Jimmy, who insists he can mount a comeback with it. He sees a girl named Anna near the cliff edge, convinces her not to jump, and discovers she is pregnant. He allows her to stay on his sofa that night. In the morning, he takes Anna to tell her parents about the pregnancy, discovering that Manoli is her father. He then lashes out at John.

Manoli spends the rest of the day out drinking with John. In the evening, Anna goes into labour. At the hospital, John runs into Sia who believes he is there to see her and tells him off. He explains he is actually there to see Anna and that his departure from Cyprus is imminent.

Melina later teaches John to sing a song in Greek so he may serenade Sia at her window. She watches from her above but does not go outside. John gives the new song he wrote to Melina so she may start her singing career. Melina tells Sia, who promptly finds John and forgives him.

Some time later, Melina successfully launches her musical career in NYC with Jimmy as her manager, while John is happily living with Sia in his cliffside home and spending time with the locals he has befriended.

== Cast ==
- Harry Connick Jr. as John
- Agni Scott as Sia
- Ali Fumiko Whitney as Melina
- Tony Demetriou as Captain Manoli
- Angeliki Philippidou as Marikou
- Lea Maleni as Koula
- Athina Roditou as Anna
- Clarence Smith as Jimmy

== Production ==
The film had the working title of The Islander, and Mira Sorvino was attached to star opposite Connick. Filming ran in Cyprus from May to November 2022, taking place in Pegeia and Nicosia.

== Release ==
Find Me Falling was released on Netflix on July 19, 2024.

== Reception ==
On the review aggregator website Rotten Tomatoes, 33% of 18 critics' reviews are positive, with an average rating of 4.8/10. Metacritic, which uses a weighted average, assigned the film a score of 50 out of 100, based on 5 critics, indicating "mixed or average" reviews.
