= Kismet: How Turkish Soap Operas Changed the World =

2014 documentary film by Nina Pashalidou

- Film poster
- Kismet: I zoi san tourkiki sapounopera
- Directed by: Nina Maria Pashalidou
- Written by: Nina Maria Pashalidou
- Produced by: Ana Alexieva, Rea Apostolides, Yuri Averov, Hilal Bakkaloglu, Martichka Bozhilova, Martina Bozhilova, Sinisa Juricic, Nina Maria Pashalidou, Eva Sayre
- Starring: Halit Ergenç, Bergüzar Korel, Meltem Miraloglu, Beren Saat, Meryem Uzerli, Songül Öden
- Cinematography: Michalis Aristomenopoulos
- Edited by: Thodoris Armaos
- Music by: Michalis Moschoutis, Spyros Moschoutis
- Production companies: Agitprop, Al-Jazeera
- Distributed by: CineDoc, Films Transit International, Women Make Movies
- Release date: 27 March 2014
- Running time: 58 minutes
- Countries: Greece, Qatar, France, Croatia, Bulgaria, Sweden, United Arab Emirates, Serbia, Canada, Finland, Singapore, Cyprus, Hungary
- Languages: Turkish, Greek, English, Bulgarian, Arabic
- Budget: €227,500

Kismet: How Turkish Soap Operas Changed the World is a 2014 documentary film written and directed by Nina Maria Pashalidou about Turkish television drama series, commonly referred to as Turkish soap operas. It is Pashalidou's second feature documentary.

== Synopsis ==
The film examines the effects that the soap operas have had on the lives of their female viewers from various regions, including the Balkans, the Middle East, and North Africa. The film uses interviews of women who view the soap operas, as well as those who act, produce, and write the television shows. The first Turkish soap opera that was aired internationally was Gümüş (also known as Noor in Arab nations) and was met with high viewership mostly due its popularity with women. Paschalidou depicts the television shows as acting not only as female fantasy represented on screen, but also as a vehicle for societal change.

== Festivals and nominations ==
- International Documentary Film Festival Amsterdam (IDFA), Nominated for Best Mid-Length Doc
- One World Human Rights International Film Festival, Czech Republic
- Movies that Matter, Amsterdam
- Thessaloniki International Film Festival
- SEOUL International Women’s Film Festival
- Margaret Mead Film Festival

== Reviews ==
- “By opening discussion about women’s rights issues and portraying another way of living in traditionally conservative societies, Greek journalist and documentatarian Paschalidou reveals that Turkish soap operas also wield a soft power and influence that is opposed by many.” (Review by Reviewed by Linda Frederiksen, Washington State University)
