= Stelana Kliris =

Stelana Kliris Στελάνα Κληρή
- Born: South Africa
- Occupation: Filmmaker
- Years active: 2002–present
- Website: meraki-films.com

Stelana Kliris (Greek: Στελάνα Κληρή) is a South African-born Greek Cypriot filmmaker. She is best known for writing, directing, and producing the English-language romantic comedy film Find Me Falling (2024), which was set and filmed in Cyprus and became the first Cypriot film to premiere on Netflix.

== Early life ==
Kliris was born in South Africa, the daughter of Greek Cypriot parents from Louvaras and Rizokarpaso. Her parents ran a grocery shop. She grew up in South Africa and studied journalism at Rhodes University in Makhanda, then spent time living in Athens and London before moving to Cyprus in 2010.

== Career ==
Kliris directed two short documentaries, Flame of Peace (2002) about the Olympic Truce and Unmasking Mavis (2002) about LGBT subcultures in South Africa. Her short film The Fiddler (2010) was inspired by her grandfather's story of his desire to own a violin. Her feature film directorial debut came with the English-language romantic comedy Committed (2014) about a man pressured to propose who meets a runaway bride. In 2016, she established the production company Meraki Films. Her next film, the English-language romantic comedy Find Me Falling (2024), was set and filmed in Cyprus; starring Harry Connick Jr. as an American rock star who buys a seaside home in Cyprus without knowing it is near a suicide hotspot, the film became the first Cypriot film to premiere on Netflix, subsequently being translated into more than 30 languages and hitting the top spot on Netflix shortly after its release.

== Filmography ==
Key
†	Denotes films that have not yet been released

Year	Title	Director	Writer	Producer	Editor	Notes
2002	Flame of Peace	Yes	No	No	No	Documentary
2002	Unmasking Mavis	Yes	No	No	No	Documentary
2010	The Fiddler	Yes	Yes	Yes	No	Short film
2010	Hope	Yes	Yes	Yes	Yes	Short film
2014	Committed	Yes	Yes	Yes	No	
2018	Pause	No	No	Yes	No	
2018	To the Moon and Back	Yes	Yes	Yes	No	Short film
2019	Watch Over Me	No	No	Co-producer	No	Short film
2020	Prodosia	No	No	Yes	No	Short film
2024	Find Me Falling	Yes	Yes	Yes	No	
TBA	Apart †	Yes	Yes	Yes	No	Post-production
