= Brian Muir =

Brian Muir may refer to:

- Brian Muir (footballer) (1936–2020), Australian rules footballer
- Brian Muir (racing driver) (1931–1983), Australian auto racing driver
- Brian Muir (sculptor) (born 1952), British sculptor who co-created the Darth Vader character from Star Wars
- Brian Muir (curator) (1943–1989), see Christchurch Art Gallery

== See also ==
- Bryan Muir (born 1973), Canadian hockey player
