= Elias Demetriou =

Greek - Cypriot filmmaker

Elias Demetriou (Greek: Ηλίας Δημητρίου) is a Greek - Cypriot filmmaker known for his films Smac, Fish n' Chips, and Coat Fitting.

== Sources ==
- Fish n' chips film review, The Hollywood Reporter
- Fish n' chips sails on by Flix
- Fish n' chips mini review by Now/here
- Elias Demetriou at Festival Scope
- Elias Demetriou at Altcine
- Elias Demetriou at Filmfestivals.com
- Elias Demetriou in Cypriot cinemas
- The rough Guide to Cyprus
- Elias Demetriou on Cineuropa
- Elias Demetriou at Harringay Online
