= Fish-and-chip shop =

Restaurant that sells fish and chips

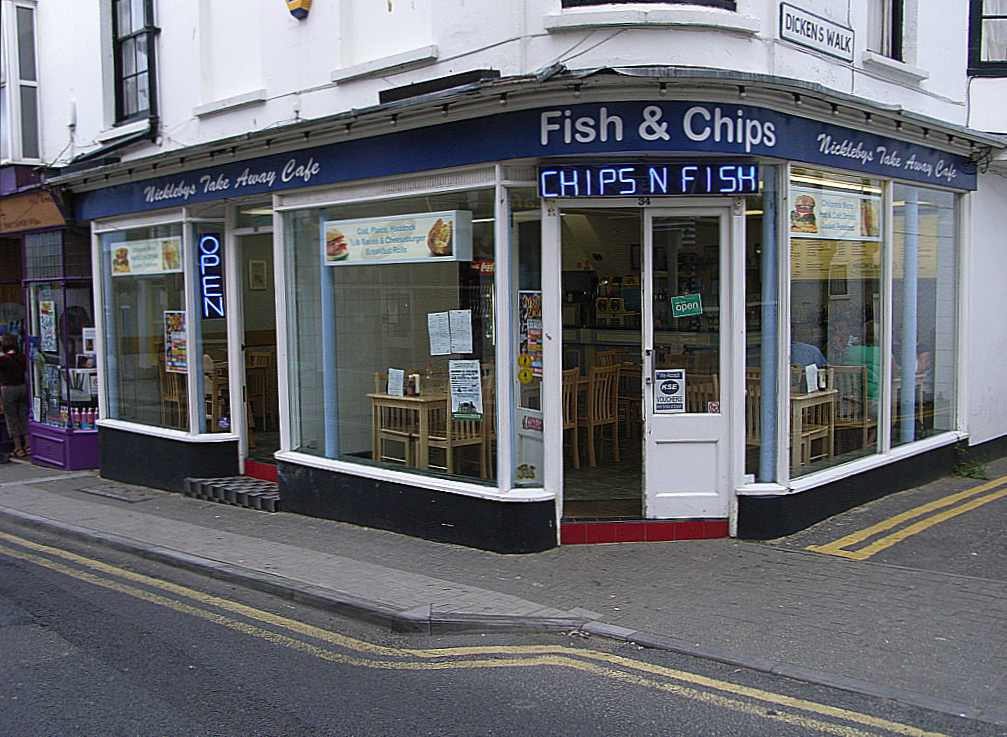
A fish-and-chip shop in Broadstairs, Kent, England

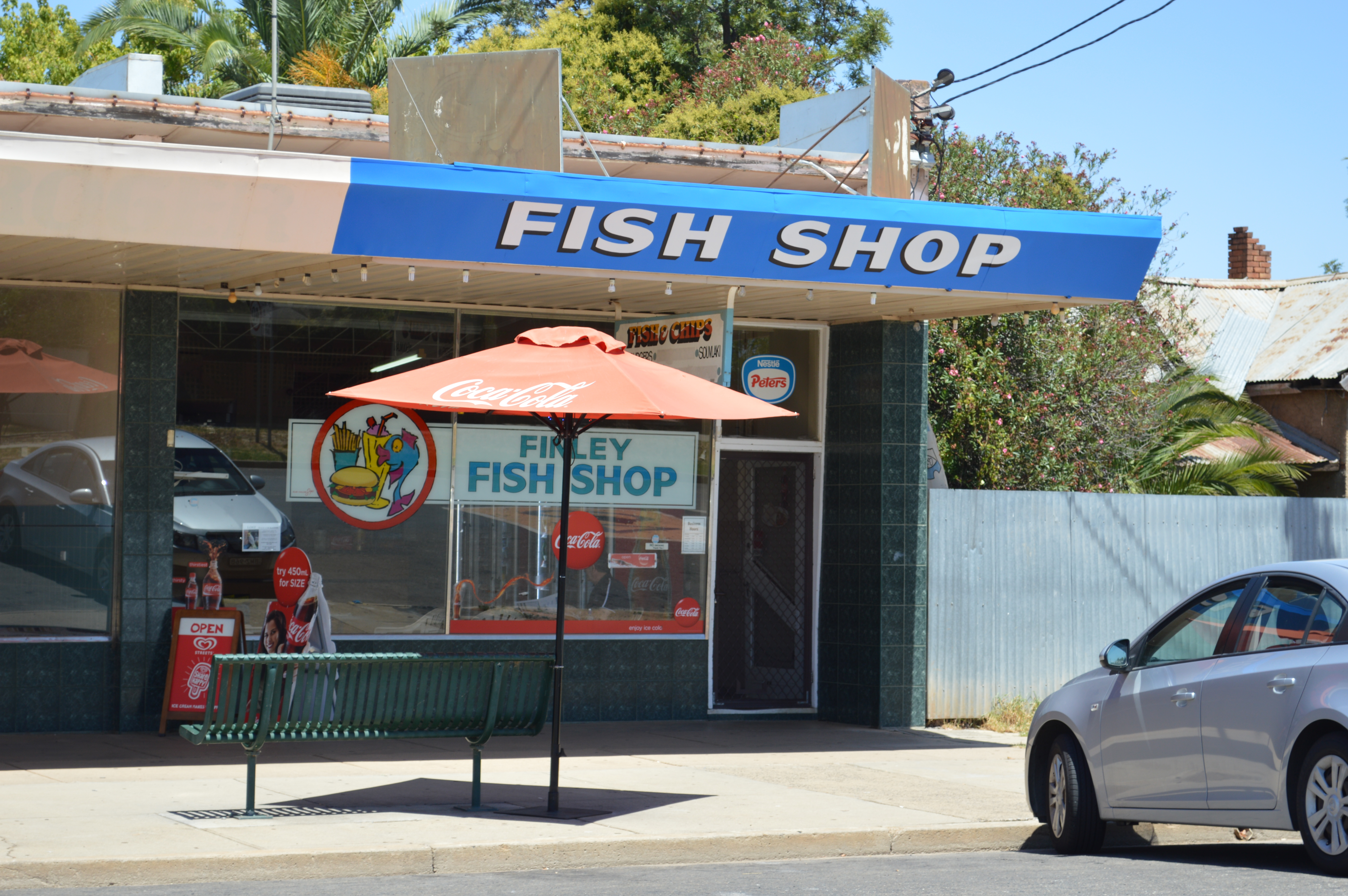
A fish-and-chip shop, Finley, New South Wales, Australia

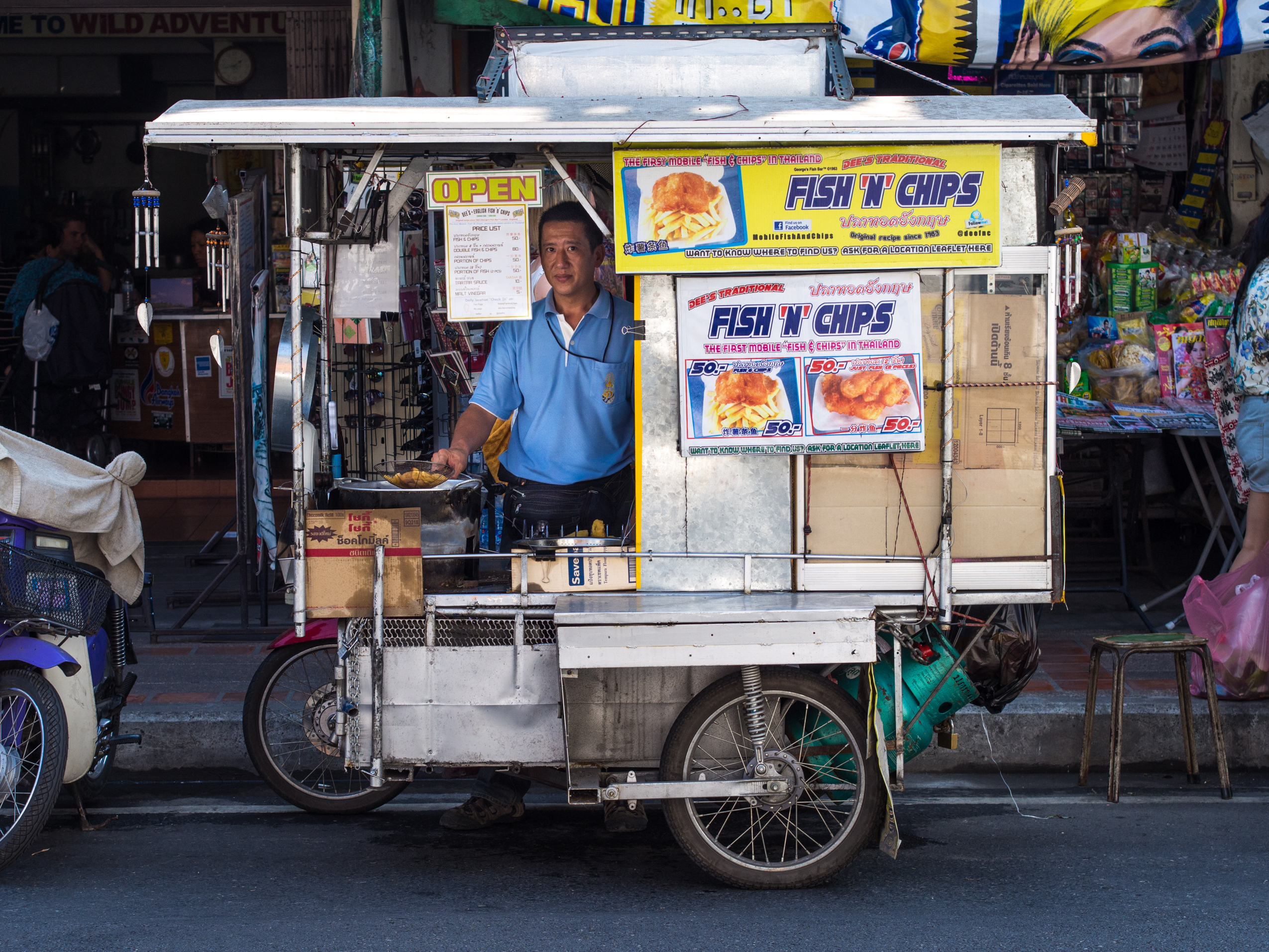
A mobile street vendor selling fish and chips in Chiang Mai, Thailand

A fish-and-chip shop, sometimes referred to as a chippy or chipper, is a business which specialises in selling fish and chips. Usually, fish-and-chip shops provide takeaway service, although some have seating facilities. Fish-and-chip shops may also sell other foods, including variations on their core offering such as battered sausage, pizza and burgers, to regional cuisine such as Indian food.

== History ==
There are two prevailing theories on who opened the first dedicated fish-and-chip shop; both date to the 1860s. Conventionally it is believed to have originated with an Eastern European Jewish family named Malin, who lived in Bow, London. The family sold fried potatoes from their house to supplement income from their rug-weaving business. Their son, 13-year-old Joseph Malin, came up with the idea of buying fish from a local fried-fish shop and hawking the two together from a tray hung around his neck as he walked the streets of London. They opened a shop called "Malin's in Bow". Malin's continued as a family business for over 100 years, and in 1968 it was recognized by the National Federation of Fish Friers as the world's oldest fish-and-chips business. It closed in the early 1970s after selling the exclusive rights to the recipe to an American fast-food chain, Arthur Treacher's Fish & Chips, who marketed it in the U.S. as "the original" British recipe, reaching a peak in the 1970s with over 800 shops. As of 2025, only a handful of Arthur Treacher's are still in business, in northern Ohio, the last place in the world the traditional Malin's fish and chips is still made, though no longer with cod.

The second contender for first shop is John Lees c. 1863. While visiting Tommyfield Market in Oldham (now Greater Manchester), Lees saw a store selling fried chips. Putting the idea together he went back to his hometown of Mossley (also Greater Manchester) and, from a wooden kiosk at a marketplace, began selling fish with chips. In 1863 he moved to a permanent store. He even had a sign that said "Lee's Chip Potato Restaurant: Oldest Estd. in the World’". A blue plaque now hangs in Tommyfield Market proclaiming it as the origin of fish and chips. However, "We don't really know who was first. Several places popped up around 1860 and nobody knew at the time that something important was beginning,” said Professor John K. Walton, author of Fish and Chips and the British Working Class, 1870-1940.

In the 1870s, the development of steam-powered fish trawlers made the availability of cold-water whitefish, like haddock and cod, available in unprecedented quantities. Also, the invention of icemaking machines allowed train transport of fresh fish to all parts of the UK. Fish and chips became a staple of factory and mill workers during the later industrial revolution because it was so ubiquitous and cheap. Henry Mayhew's London Labour and the London Poor of 1865 estimated that there were around 300 fried-fish sellers in London, mostly operating from carts or tiny shops where "a slice of bread ... is sold or offered with the fish for a penny. The cry of the seller is 'fish and bread a penny'". By 1910, there were around 25,000 chippies in the UK, reaching more than 35,000 at its peak in 1927, compared to only 10,500 by 2013.

In 1928, during the interwar peak of the fish-and-chip shop boom, Harry Ramsden's fast-food restaurant chain opened in the UK. It became the best known fish-and-chip chain in the UK. It earned a place in the Guinness Book Of Records when, on a single day in 1952, a shop in Guiseley, West Yorkshire served 10,000 orders of fish and chips.

== Etymology ==
The word "chip shop" is first recorded by the Oxford English Dictionary in 1892. "Chippy" or "chippie" was first recorded in 1961. Occasionally the type of fish will be specified, as in 'Cod-n-Chips'.

== Operations ==
Many British villages, suburbs, towns and cities have fish and chip shops, especially near coastal regions.

Fish and chip outlets sell roughly 30% of all the white fish consumed in the United Kingdom, and they use 10% of the UK potato crop.

In Ireland, many "chippers" are operated by Italian immigrant families, all native to the Province of Frosinone in Lazio. The Italian chip shop tradition began with Giuseppe Cervi, who took a boat to America in the 1880s but instead disembarked at Queenstown (modern-day Cobh in County Cork) and walked to Dublin, establishing a takeaway at 22 Great Brunswick Street (modern-day Pearse Street).

== Regional differences ==
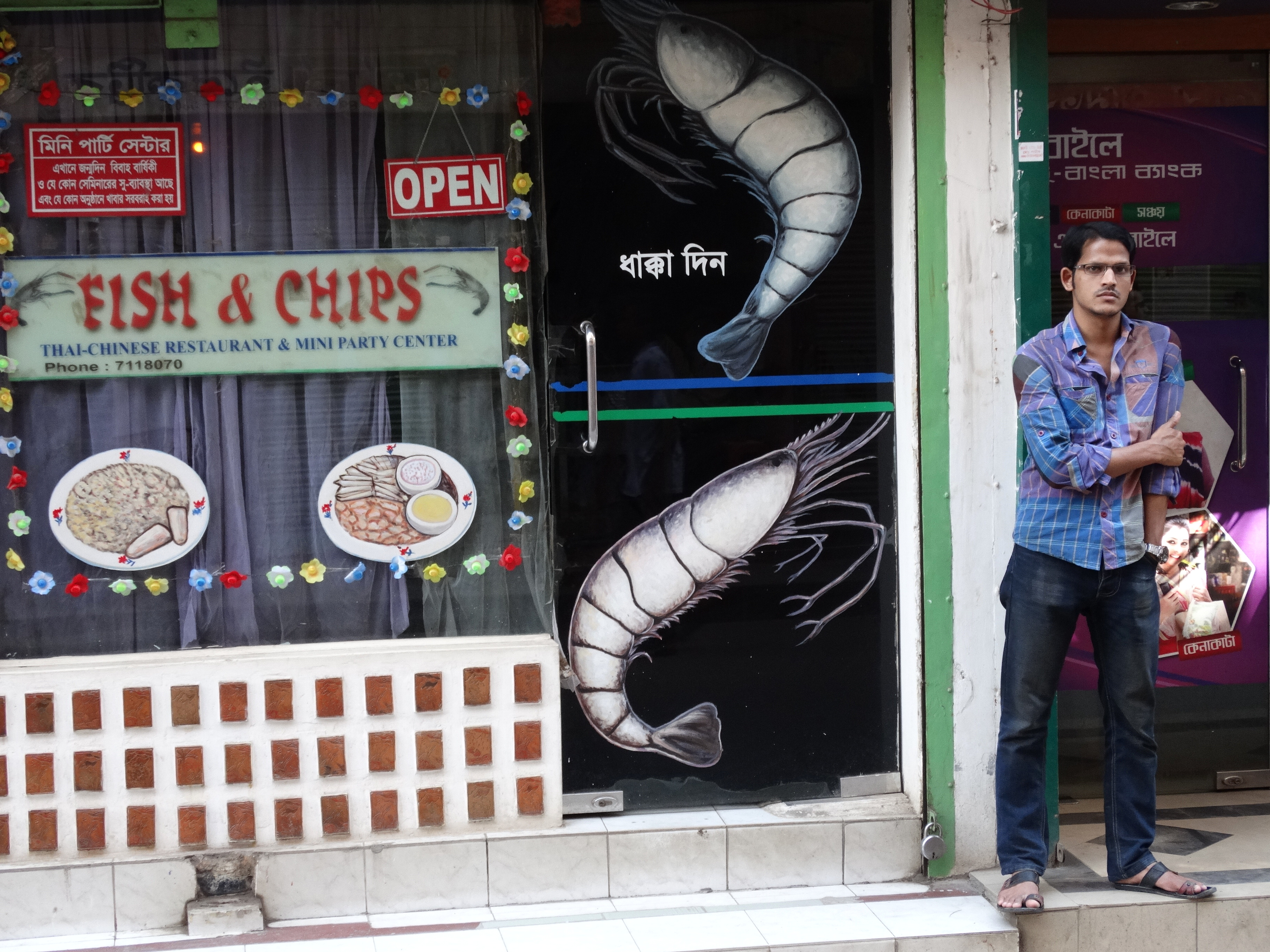
A Thai Chinese fish and chip shop in Bangladesh, a former British colony.

In Scotland, the fish tends to be haddock, whereas in England, it tends to be cod. This is because both fish tend to be sourced from Scottish waters in the North Sea and then shipped around the UK. Haddock was thought to taste better than cod when fresh, while cod tasted better a few days later. In the days before refrigerated haulage this meant that haddock would taste bad by the time it made it out of Scotland, while the cod would still taste good if it took a few days to reach its destination. Hake, pollock, whiting, and plaice are also seen at many chip shops. In Scotland, 'special fish' is a variant where the haddock is breadcrumbed instead of battered.

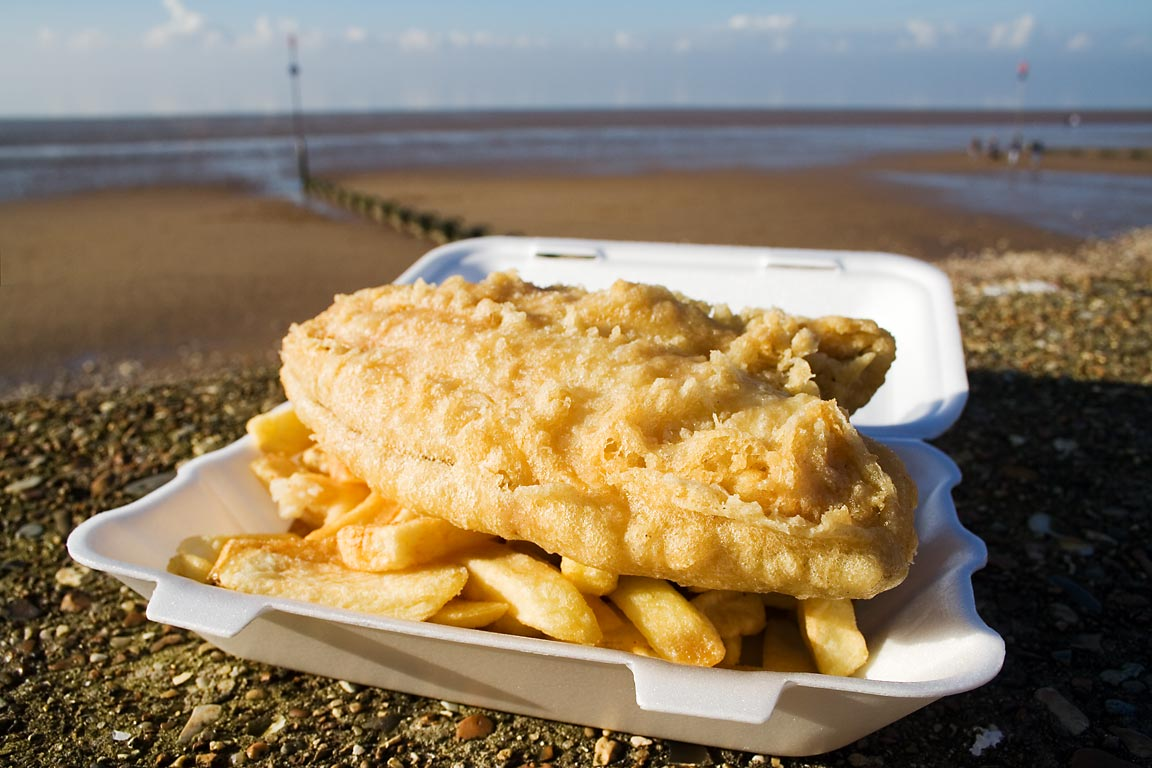
Fish and chips from a takeaway

A number of fish and chip shop condiments exist, including salt and vinegar (very often actually non-brewed condiment) across the UK, mushy peas and curry sauce in various parts of the UK, chip spice in Hull, Hendersons Relish in Sheffield, chippy sauce in Edinburgh, gravy across much of the UK, mushy pea and mint sauce in Nottingham and Derby, and gravy and cheese in Yorkshire. In Canada, most shops offer malt vinegar or the option to add gravy, usually for a small charge.

There are also regional variations with the oil used to cook the fish and chips. Traditional frying uses beef dripping or lard; however, vegetable oils, such as palm oil, rapeseed or peanut oil (used because of its relatively high smoke point) now predominate.

There are also a number of other offerings at fish and chip shops that do not involve fish, such as the battered sausage. It is now generally rare to find a fish and chip shop that offers no main course besides fish and chips in the UK. Burgers, pies, pasties, pizzas, sausages, kebabs and chicken (all of which may or may not be served or bought with chips) are all regular menu items in many outlets. Many also offer chips with topping options such as cheese, mushy peas, gravy or curry sauce.

== In art, film and television ==
- One of David Hockney's earliest lithographs, Fish & Chip Shop, was given to his local chip shop, the Sea Catch in Eccleshill in 1954. It was sold in auction, at Christie's in London, in 2017, with an estimate of £6,000–£8.000..
- Fish n' Chips is a 2011 British–Cypriot comedy-drama film written, directed, co-produced, and co-edited by Elias Demetriou. It stars Marios Ioannou as a Greek–Cypriot immigrant in London who decides to open his own fish and chip shop in Cyprus, only for his life to subsequently fall apart around him.
- Papadopoulos & Sons is a 2012 British comedy-drama film written and directed by Marcus Markou and self-distributed in the UK and Ireland by Markou's own company Double M Films through an agreement with Cineworld. It concerns Greek immigrant Harry Papadopoulos, a successful entrepreneur reigning over a financial empire in the food industry, who loses everything except for a dormant and forgotten fish and chip shop half-owned by Harry's brother Spiros.

== See also ==
- List of fish and chip restaurants
- Pie shop
