= List of Minnesotan dishes =

Minnesotan dishes include any food or drink invented within Minnesota or the surrounding region that is popular in Minnesota. Additionally, it can include dishes that were brought to Minnesota by immigrant groups.

== Breads ==
- Cranberry wild rice bread, a Minnesotan bread that can be found at bakeries across the state.
- Lefse, made with riced potatoes, can include all purpose (wheat) flour, and includes butter, and milk, cream, or lard. It is cooked on a large, flat griddle. In Minnesota it is typically made with potatoes. It is comparable to a tortilla. Lefse is a traditional accompaniment to lutefisk, and the fish is often rolled up in the lefse. It is eaten plain or filled.
- Limpa bread
- Cardamom bread, also known as Finnish pulla bread.
- German Christmas bread (stollen), essentially a German fruitcake made with dried fruit, marzipan, spices, nuts, and topped with icing.

=== Pancakes ===
- Potato pancakes, are shallow-fried pancakes of grated or ground potato, matzo meal or flour and a binding ingredient such as egg or applesauce, often flavored with grated garlic or onion and seasonings. They may be topped with a variety of condiments, ranging from the savory (such as sour cream or cottage cheese), to the sweet (such as apple sauce or sugar).
- Wild rice pancake
- Swedish pancake
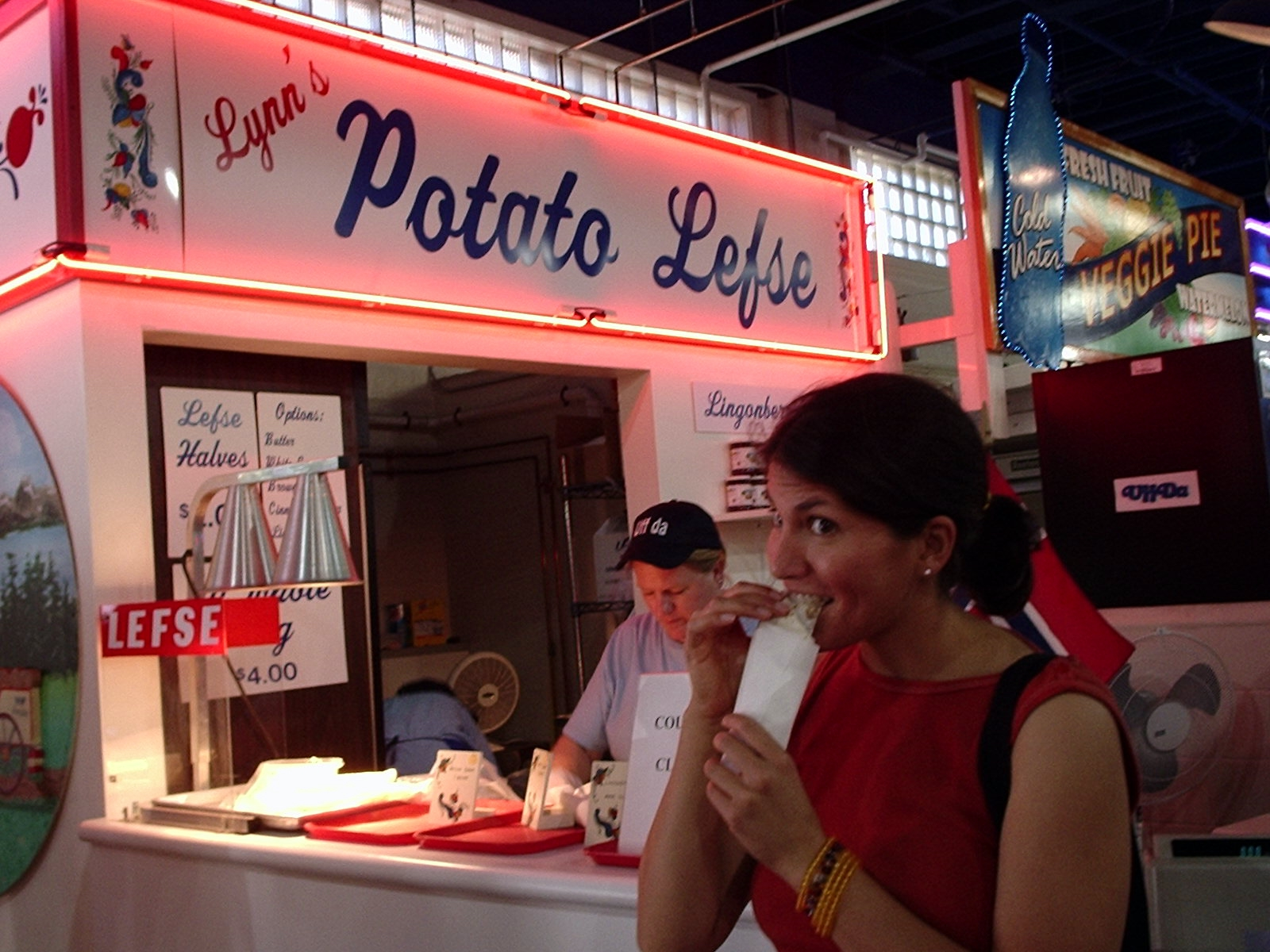
Lefse at the Minnesota state fair

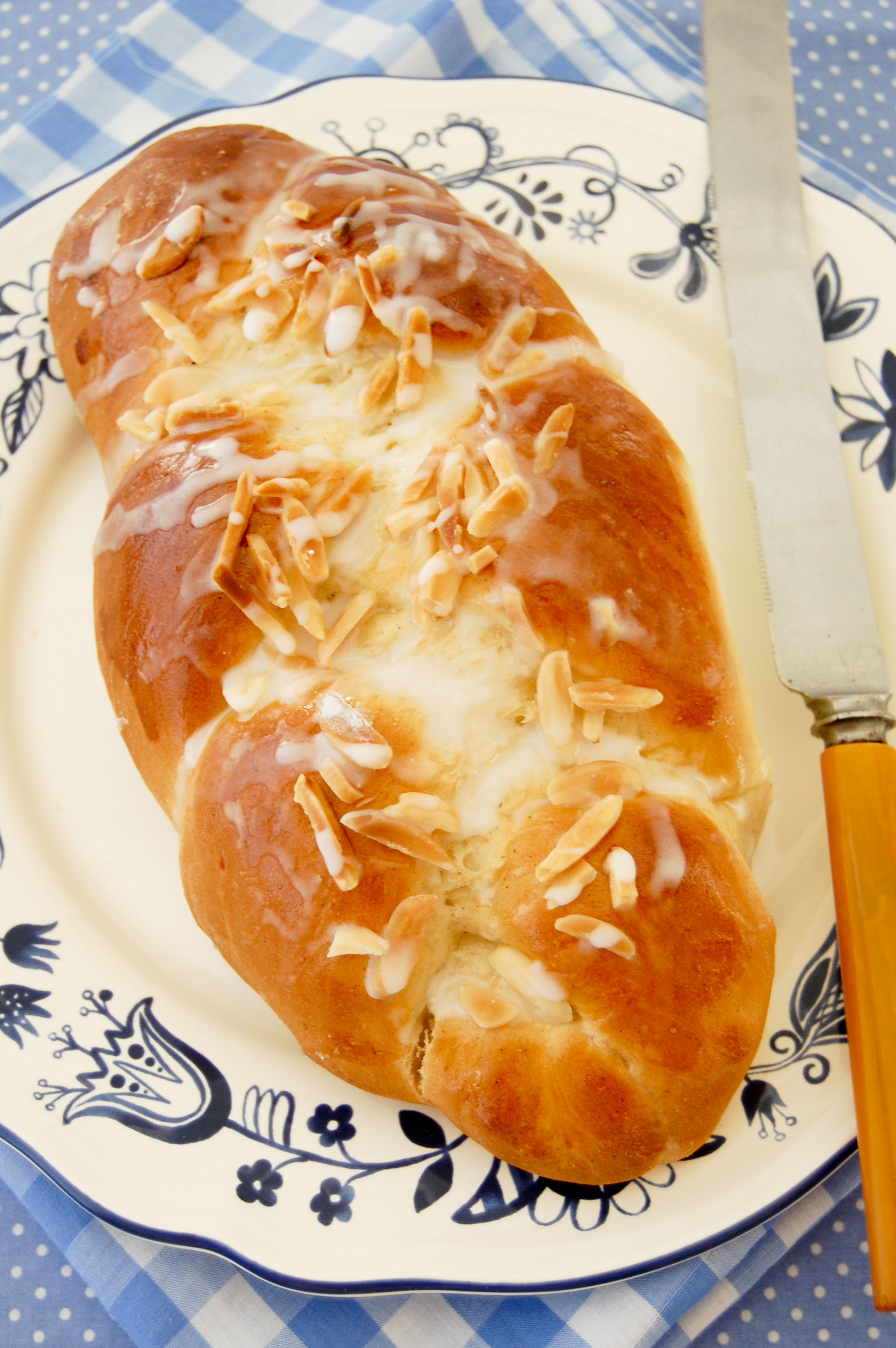
Cardamom bread

== Salads ==
- Jello salad
- Potato salad
- Pasta salad
- Nordic-style cucumber salad
- Macaroni salad
- Wild rice salad, a salad consisting of fruit, nuts, greens, vegetables, and cooked wild rice.
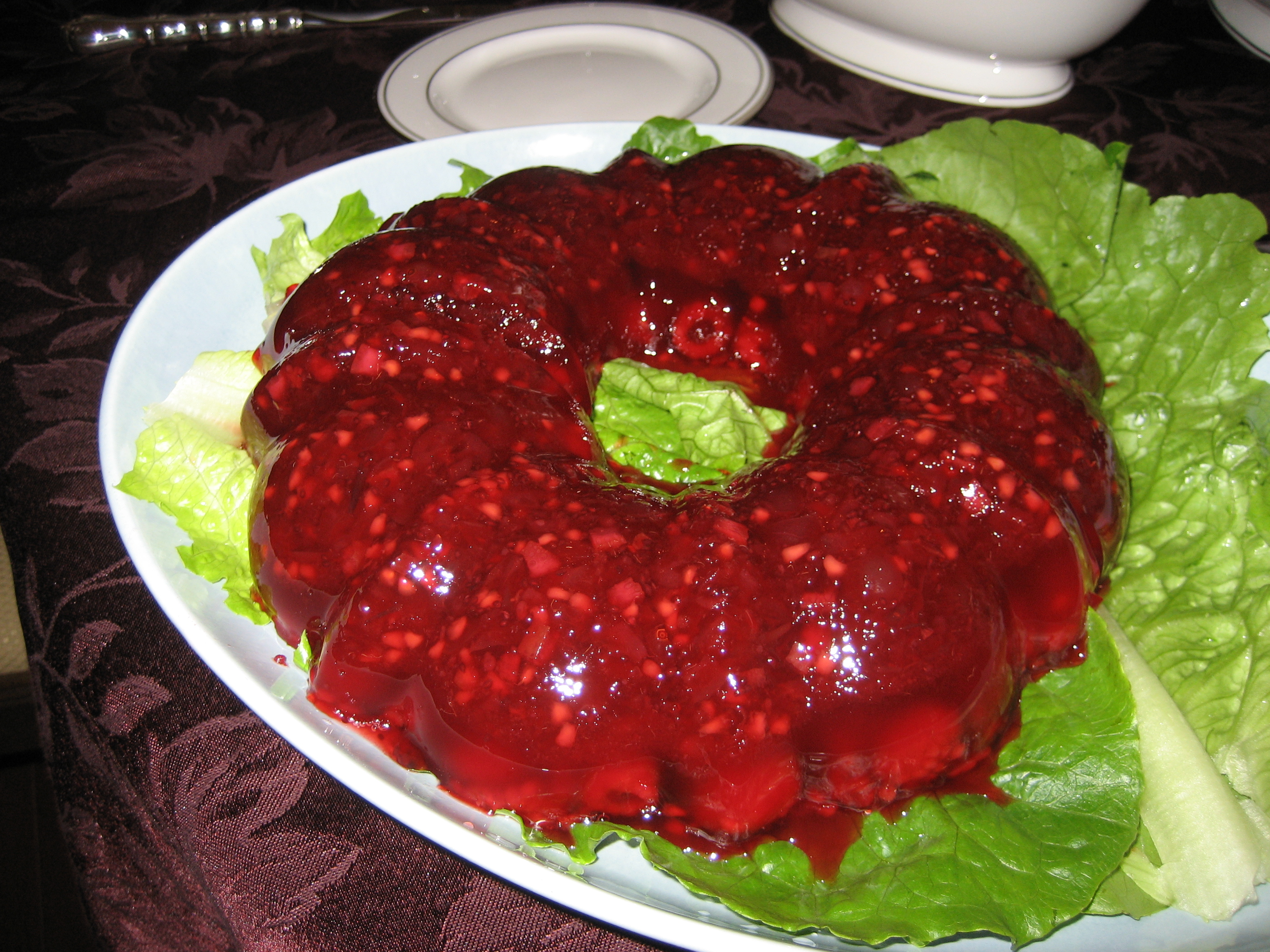
Jello salad with cranberries

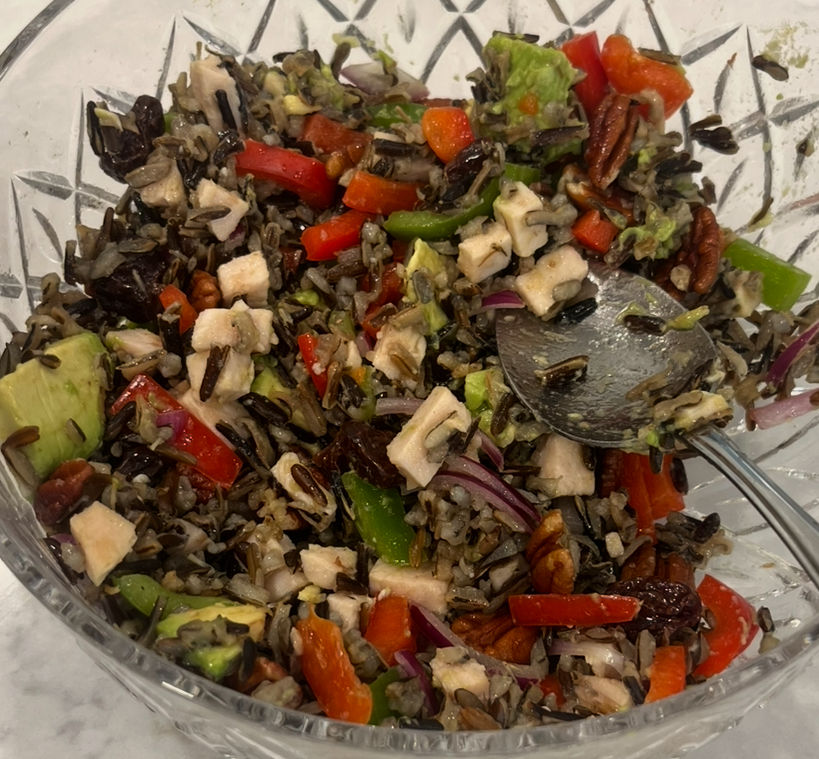
Wild rice salad

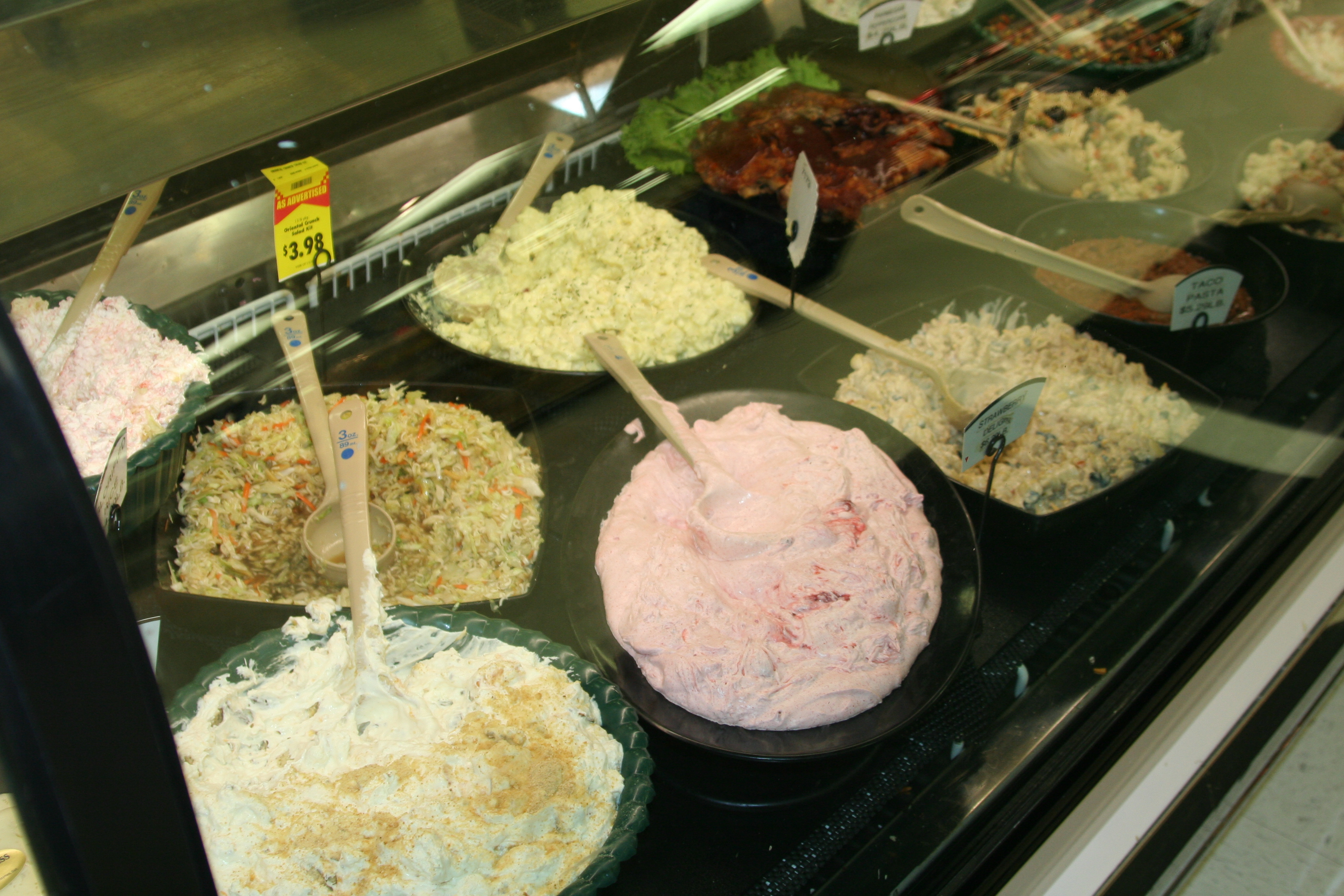
Various dessert, pasta, and potato salads

== Soups ==
- Knoephla stew, popular in Western Minnesota, it is typically made with spätzle, chicken, and potatoes.
- Booyah stew, a thick stew usually requiring up to two days and multiple cooks to prepare. In cooking booyah, one makes a base or broth derived from meat bones, to which vegetables are added. Beef, chicken, and pork are popular varieties of meat for booyah, with vegetables such as carrots, peas, onion, and potatoes also in the mix. A wide variety of seasonings are used.
- Cream soups, cream of mushroom, cream of chicken, and cream of celery are very popular and are often used to make hotdish. Cream of mushroom is so popular it was even proposed as the official state soup.
- Wild rice soup, considered a staple of the cuisine. It typically includes chicken, much like chicken noodle soup.
- Lapskaus, a Norwegian stew containing meat, potatoes and vegetables cooked slowly together until they are melting and tender. This dish may be called brun lapskaus (stew made with gravy), lys lapskaus (stew made with vegetables and pork meat) or suppelapskaus, where the gravy has been substituted by a light beef stock.
- Walleye chowder, a milk-based chowder, that includes walleye; found in the Arrowhead region
- Finnish fish soup
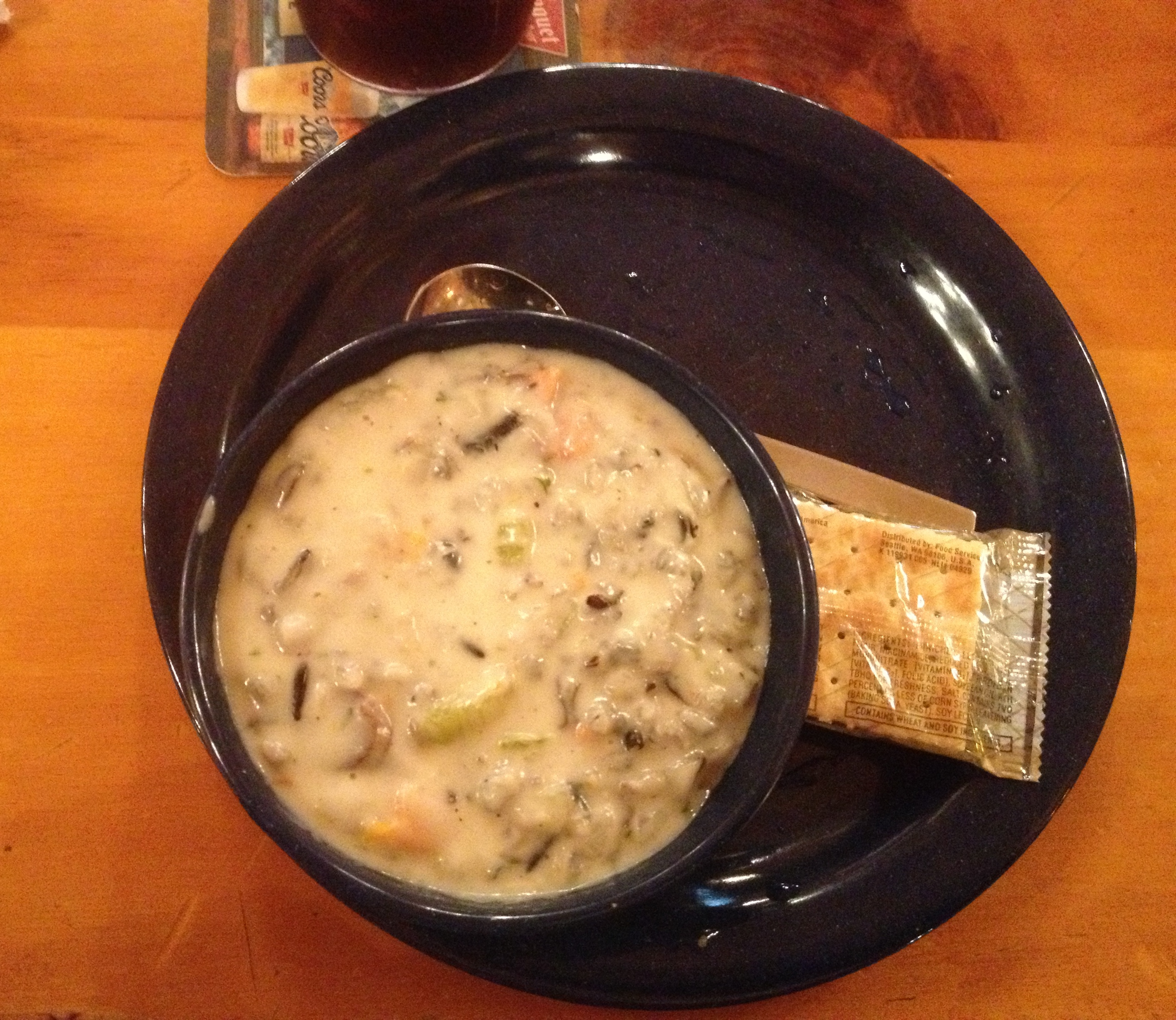
Chicken and wild rice soup

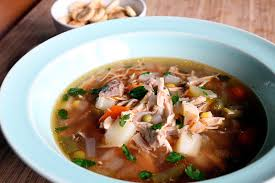
Booyah stew

== Casseroles ==
- Mock chow mein is a variation of chow mein including ground beef and cream of mushroom soup that is baked in a casserole dish.
- Hotdish is a casserole dish that typically contains a starch, a meat, and a canned or frozen vegetable mixed with canned soup that must be served hot or warm. the most popular varieties in Minnesota are tater tot, tuna, chicken, hamburger, and wild rice hotdish. They were invented in Minnesota or the Upper Midwest; it is one of Minnesota's most iconic dishes.
  - Tater Tot Hotdish is made with ground beef, topped with tater tots, and flavored with thick condensed cream of mushroom soup sauce, but some versions in Minnesota use the official state grain wild rice, or even macaroni, in place of the potatoes. Tater tot hotdish is considered the national dish of Minnesota.
  - Sarma hotdish, a fusion hotdish made with layers of filling, sauerkraut, and cabbage leaves. The filling is usually a mix of tomato soup, ground beef, and rice. This dish is based on sarma and is eaten in Northern Minnesota
  - Tuna hotdish
- Goulash is made with ground beef, canned tomato, macaroni, and occasionally creamed corn. They are often served at potlucks along with hotdish.
- Baked penne is a baked pasta dish consisting of cream cheese, penne pasta, and marinara sauce, it can also be sprinkled with mozzarella and Parmesan. This dish is not an uncommon sight at potlucks.
- Hoppel poppel is an egg casserole made with leftovers. the casserole dish is associated with the Midwestern United States. The basic recipe for the casserole is home fries (fried potatoes), scrambled eggs, and onion. Sometimes it is topped with melted cheese. Other ingredients like green pepper or mushrooms can be added to the basic combination, and a variety of meats can be used including bacon, ham and salami. It was brought to Minnesota by German immigrants.
- Egg bake, a baked dish similar to a strata. This dish consists of eggs, and other breakfast ingredients, but also can include bread. It can also be called a breakfast hotdish.
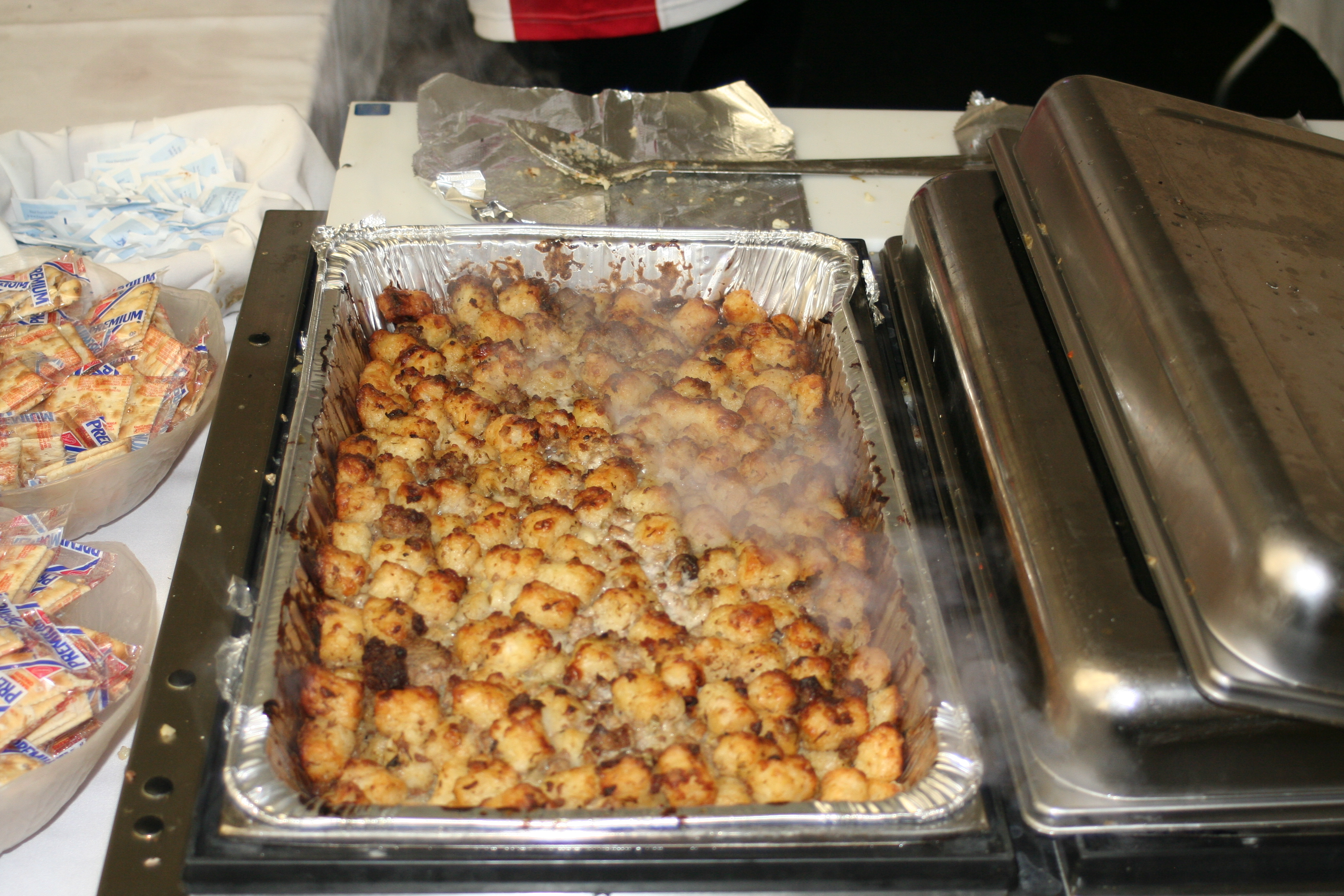
Tater tot hotdish at the Winter Carnival in St. Paul

== Main dishes ==
- Lutefisk, dried whitefish. Usually cod is used, but ling and burbot are also used. It is made from aged stockfish(air-dried whitefish), or dried and salted cod, cured in lye. Lutefisk is traditionally served with boiled potatoes, mashed green peas, melted butter and small pieces of fried bacon. Madison, Minnesota has dubbed itself the "lutefisk capital of the world" as well as claiming the largest per capita consumption of lutefisk in Minnesota. It was brought to Minnesota by Norwegian immigrants.
- Swedish meatballs, usually made with a mix of ground beef and ground pork, or just with ground beef, which is mixed into a mixture of beaten eggs, breadcrumbs soaked in milk, and grated raw onions or finely chopped and fried onions. Cream is often added for more luxurious versions. The meatball mixture is seasoned with salt and white pepper or a mixture of white pepper and allspice. Swedish meatballs are traditionally served with gravy, boiled or mashed potatoes, lingonberry jam, and sometimes pickled cucumber. It was brought to Minnesota by Swedish immigrants.
  - Swedish meatballs stuffed with wild rice
- Norwegian meatballs, a dish that is very similar to Swedish meatballs, except they are shaped like patties and are served with a brown gravy.
- Smoked lake fish, smoked fish such as lake trout and salmon are commonly eaten in towns on the North Shore. These fish are often served on crackers smeared with cream cheese.
- Baked walleye, typically with lemon and dill, baked walleye is a popular dish found in restaurants across the state.
- Lefse buss, meatballs wrapped in a lefse, sometimes with gravy drizzled on top. This dish can be served with mashed potatoes or french fries.
- Lefse wraps, a wrap using lefse instead of a tortilla.
- Lefse melt, lefse that has been filled with meat and melting cheese that is folded, and toasted until the cheese melts. It is similar to a melt sandwich.
- Walleye fingers, pieces of cut-up walleye that are deep-fried; popular in Minnesota because they are the state fish. It can also be served as a sandwich in Minnesota's pubs. Deep-fried walleye on a stick is a Minnesota State Fair food.
- Iron Range pot roast, a pot roast made with porketta, potatoes, and seasonings.
- Shore Lunch, a pan fried fish, usually cooked over an open fire, It can be served with fried potatoes, beans, bread, onion, diced bacon and some form of dessert. The fish is usually caught in a lake or river and cooked on shore, hence the name "shore lunch".
- Spam and eggs
- Scandinavian rice pudding is rice mixed with milk and other ingredients. It was brought to Minnesota by immigrants and is enjoyed as breakfast or dessert.
- Manoomin porridge, a porridge dish containing wild rice.
- Rømmegrøt, a thick and rich porridgemade with sour cream, whole milk, wheat flour, butter, and salt. It is generally drizzled in butter and sprinkled with sugar and ground cinnamon. It can be eaten with cured meat. It was brought to Minnesota by Norwegian immigrants.
- Pasty, made by placing an uncooked filling, typically meat and vegetables, in the middle of a flat shortcrust pastry circle, bringing the edges together in the middle, and crimping over the top to form a seal before baking. Associated with immigrants from the UK, they are popular in the Iron Range of Minnesota. They are popular in the iron range of Minnesota, especially as a lunch for iron miners.
- Corn dogs, a sausage on a stick that is deep-fried in corn batter.
  - Corn brat, another variety eaten in Minnesota is the corn brat, a brat on a stick that is fried in cornmeal. This is a popular street food at the state fair.
- Minnesota-style chow mein, made with celery, bean sprouts, ground pork, and topped with processed chicken.
- Walleye cakes - fish cakes made with walleye meat.
- Funeral bread – pumpernickel, rye, or cinnamon bread topped with a spreadable cheese such Cheez Whiz or cream cheese and green olives. Particularly popular in Roseau.

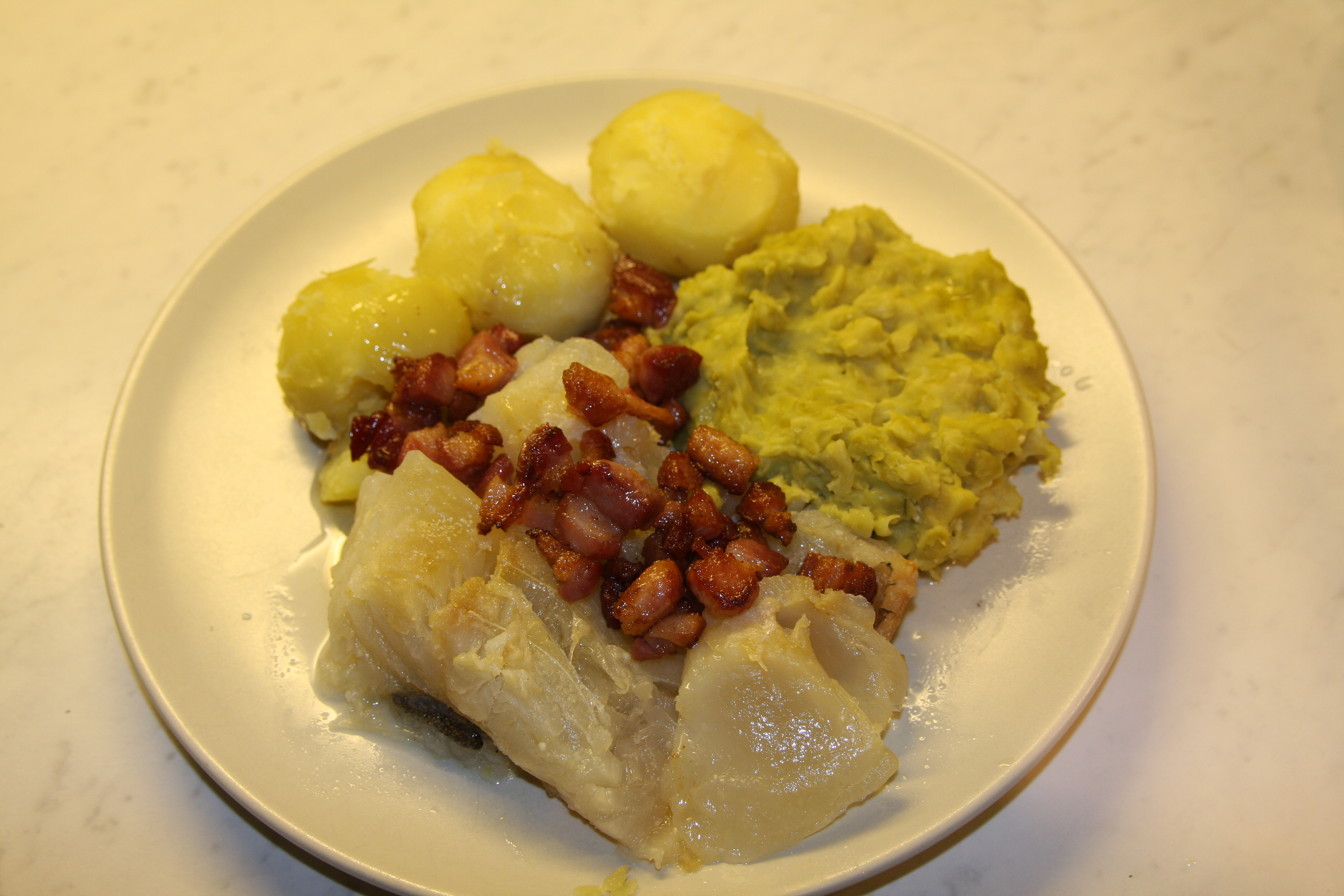
Lutefisk with traditional accompaniments

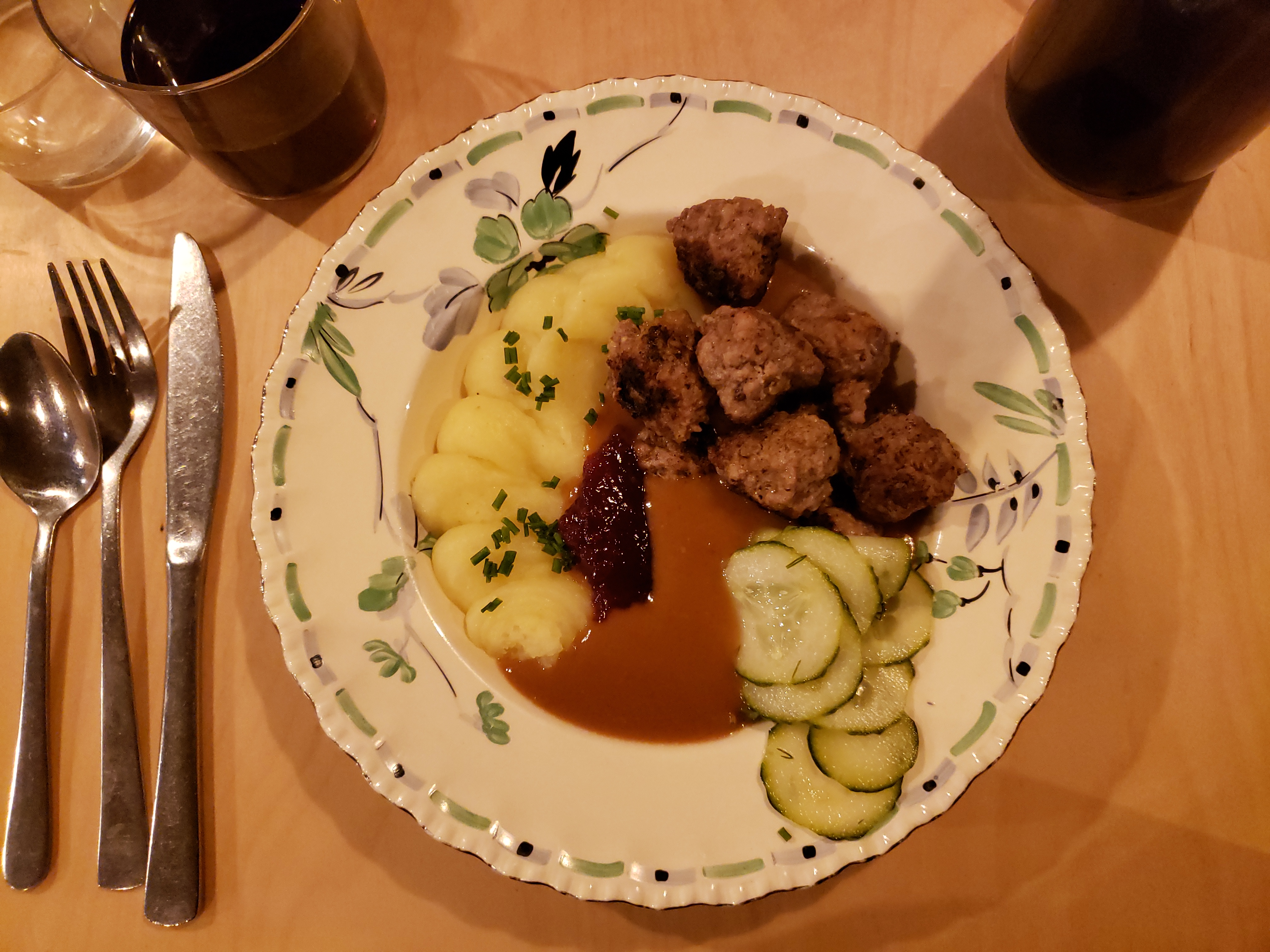
Swedish meatballs served with mashed potato, pickled cucumbers, lingonberry jam, and gravy

== Pizza ==
- Minnesota-style pizza, a thin-crust pizza, cut into squares, with hearty toppings. It is popular in the Twin Cities and the rest of Minnesota, with several chain restaurants offering the style.
- Pizza rolls, a popular snack food in Minnesota, invented in Duluth.
- Pickle pizza, a pizza made with ranch, pickles, dill, and mozzarella cheese. It is a popular food at the state fair, and it is also served at various restaurants. Some restaurants claim it originated in Minnesota. The pie was inspired by Minnesota sushi.

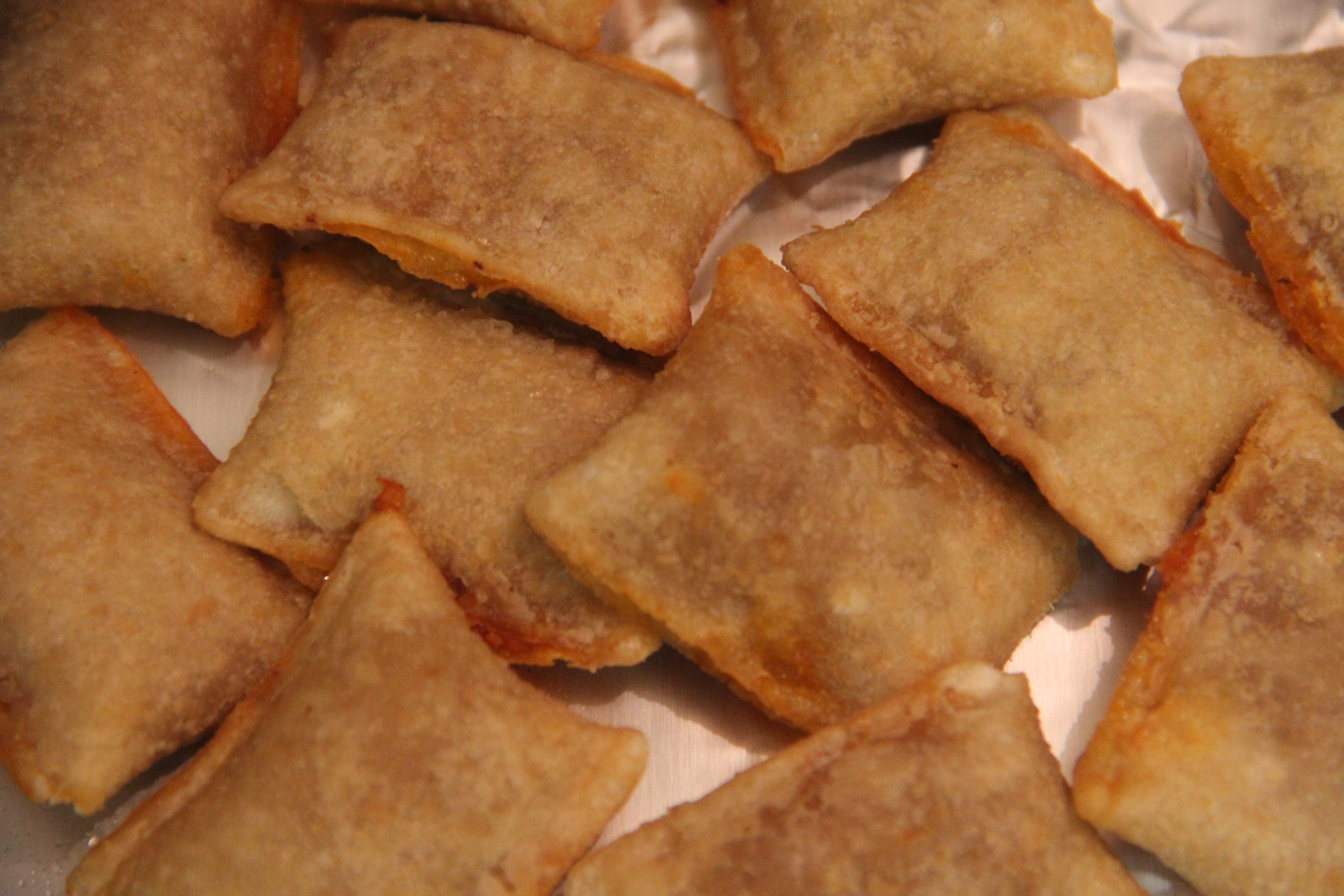
Pizza rolls

== Sandwiches ==
- Porketta sandwiches, a sandwich consisting of slow-roasted, seasoned pork, which is placed on ciabatta or a hard roll. It can be served with mustard, banana peppers, roasted red peppers, or provolone cheese, but is commonly served plain. Porketta remains a popular local dish in towns such as Hibbing, Minnesota with distributors such as Fraboni Sausage.
- Hot beef commercial, an open-faced sandwich, with pot roast, mashed potatoes, and gravy.
- Hot turkey commercial, an open-faced sandwich, with turkey breast, mashed potatoes, and gravy; sometimes eaten after Thanksgiving.
- Fried walleye sandwich, a fried walleye filet on a hard roll or burger bun, can be topped with tartar sauce, mayonnaise, lettuce, and tomato.
- Hot dago, a sandwich consisting of an Italian sausage patty between two pieces of bread. It is usually topped with melted cheese and marinara sauce.
- South American (sandwich), invented in the Iron Range. It is a bar snack made with several kinds of minced meat, onions, tomatoes, peppers, celery and other leftovers between two slices of bread.
- Scandinavian open-faced sandwiches(smørrebrød)
- Jucy Lucy, a burger with melted cheese in the patty. Two bars in Minneapolis claim to be the inventor of the burger, while other bars and restaurants have created their own interpretations of the style. In a jucy lucy both patties around the cheese to create a single patty with a cheese core. As the burger cooks, the cheese inside melts. This has the effect of keeping the meat near the center of the burger very juicy. It also separates the cheese from the bun, resulting in a slightly different texture than the usual cheeseburger. Burger toppings such as condiments, onions, and pickles may be added. It was invented in Minneapolis and is one of the most iconic dishes in Minnesota.
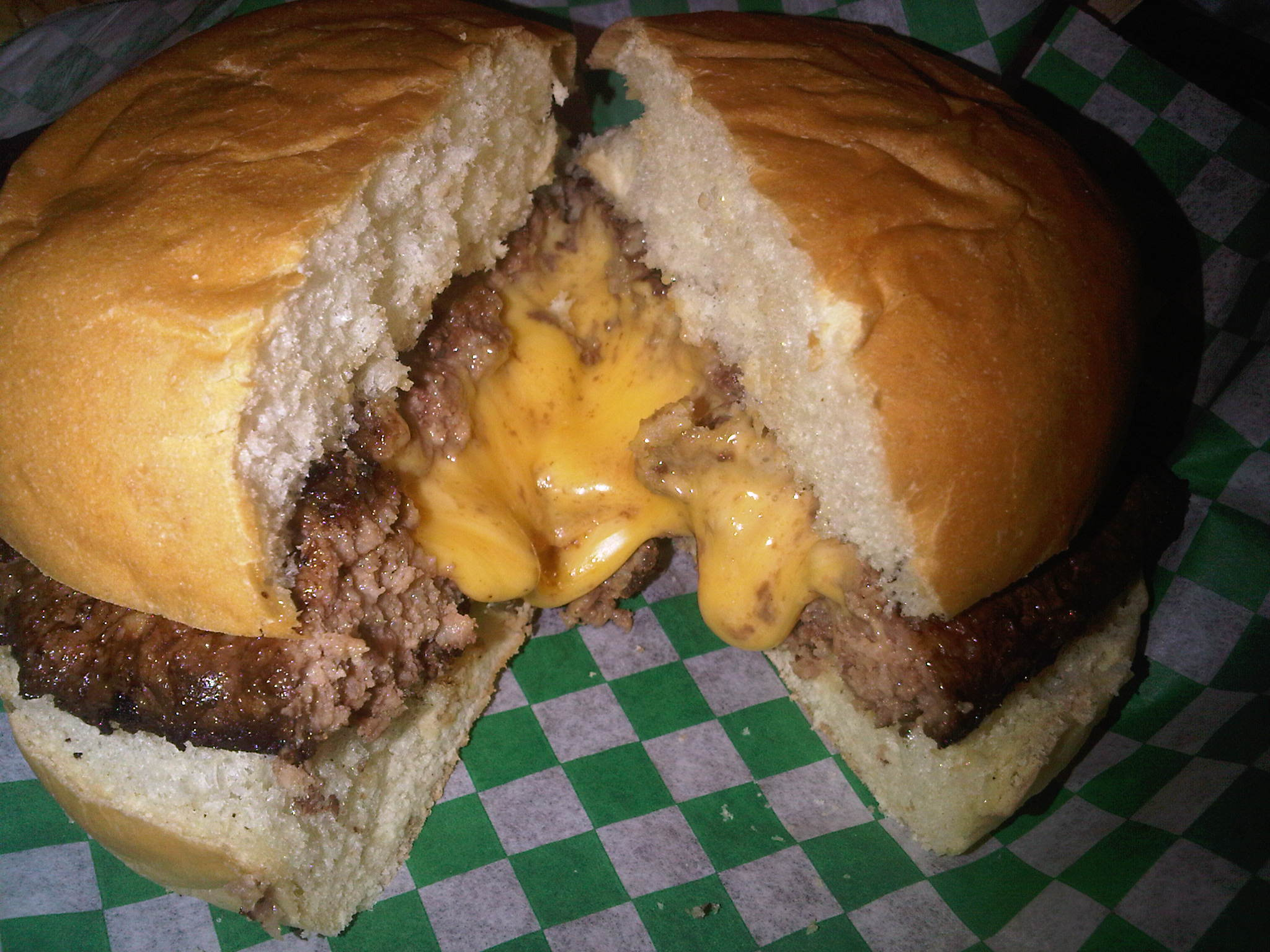
Jucy lucy

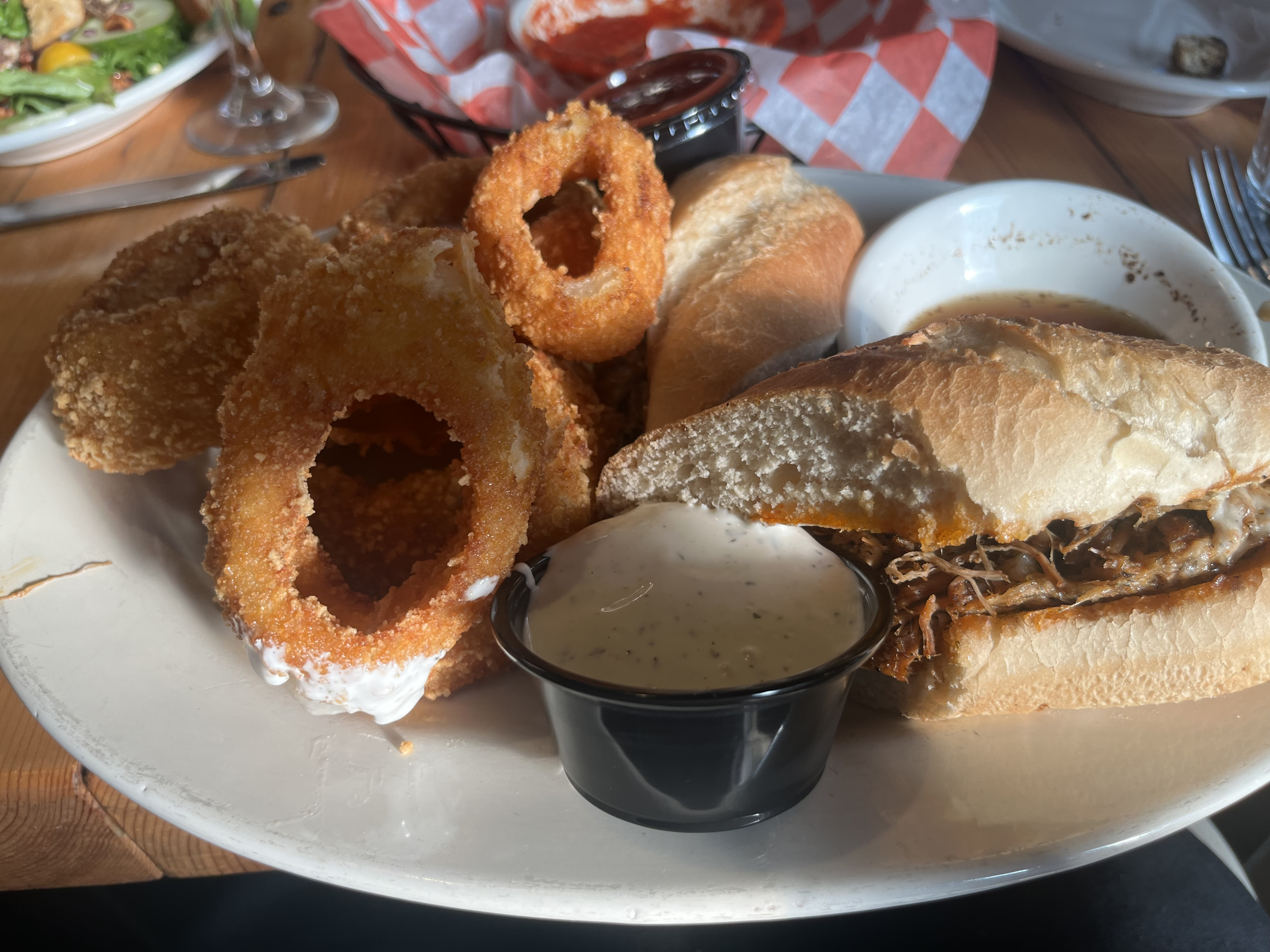
A Porketta sandwich served with ranch and onion rings

== Desserts and pastries ==
- Dessert salads, including cookie salad, watergate salad, Jello fluff (cottage cheese, canned fruit, jello, and whipped topping), Snickers salad, strawberry delight, and glorified rice.
- European cookies, including rosettes, Sandbakelse, lebkuchen, and krumkake.
- Dessert bars
- Scotcharoos, a variety of dessert bar popular in Minnesota
- Bundt cakes, a donut-shaped cake, invented in Minneapolis
- Kransekake
- German Christmas bread (stollen), essentially a German fruitcake made with dried fruit, marzipan, spices, nuts, and topped with icing.
- gingerbread
- German baked apples stuffed with marzipan and other ingredients
- Blue Moon, an ice cream flavor that is popular in Minnesota and throughout the Midwest.
- Pie à la Mode, pie served with ice cream, this was invented in Duluth.
- Sweetened rice pudding

=== Pastries ===
- Poppy seed roll
- Blueberry muffin, state muffin of Minnesota.
- Almond kringler, Kringle made with buttery shortcrust, almond filling, and almond glaze, with shaved almonds. Often, prepared in an oval or rectanglular shape, unlike Wisconsin kringles.
- Kolaches, folded dough pastry made with cream cheese, jam, chocolate, or poppyseed filling in Minnesota.
- Potica, a rolled pastry made of leavened paper-thin dough filled with any of a great variety of fillings, but most often with walnut filling.
- Scandinavian donut (smultring), a Norwegian cake donut made with cardamom and cinnamon

== Side dishes ==
- Minnesota-style cheese curds are often served battered and deep-fried.
- Sauerkraut, sliced and fermented cabbage, was brought to Minnesota by German immigrants.
- Cabbage rolls
  - Sarma
- Deep-fried ranch dressing, a street food that was invented at the state fair.
- Tater kegs, a larger tater tot that is stuffed with cheese and meats. This appetizer can be found at restaurants across the state and was invented in Minnesota.
- Corn on the cob, typically locally-grown sweet corn
- Gravlax
- Minnesota sushi, an appetizer that contains a pickle, covered in cream cheese and wrapped in ham, and cut into slices like sushi.
- Basil wings, dry-rub chicken wings made with tempura-fried basil and numerous spices. Basil wings are a fusion dish originating in the Twin Cities.
- European dumplings, eaten occasionally, include kluski, Spätzle, halušky, potato dumplings, and pierogis.

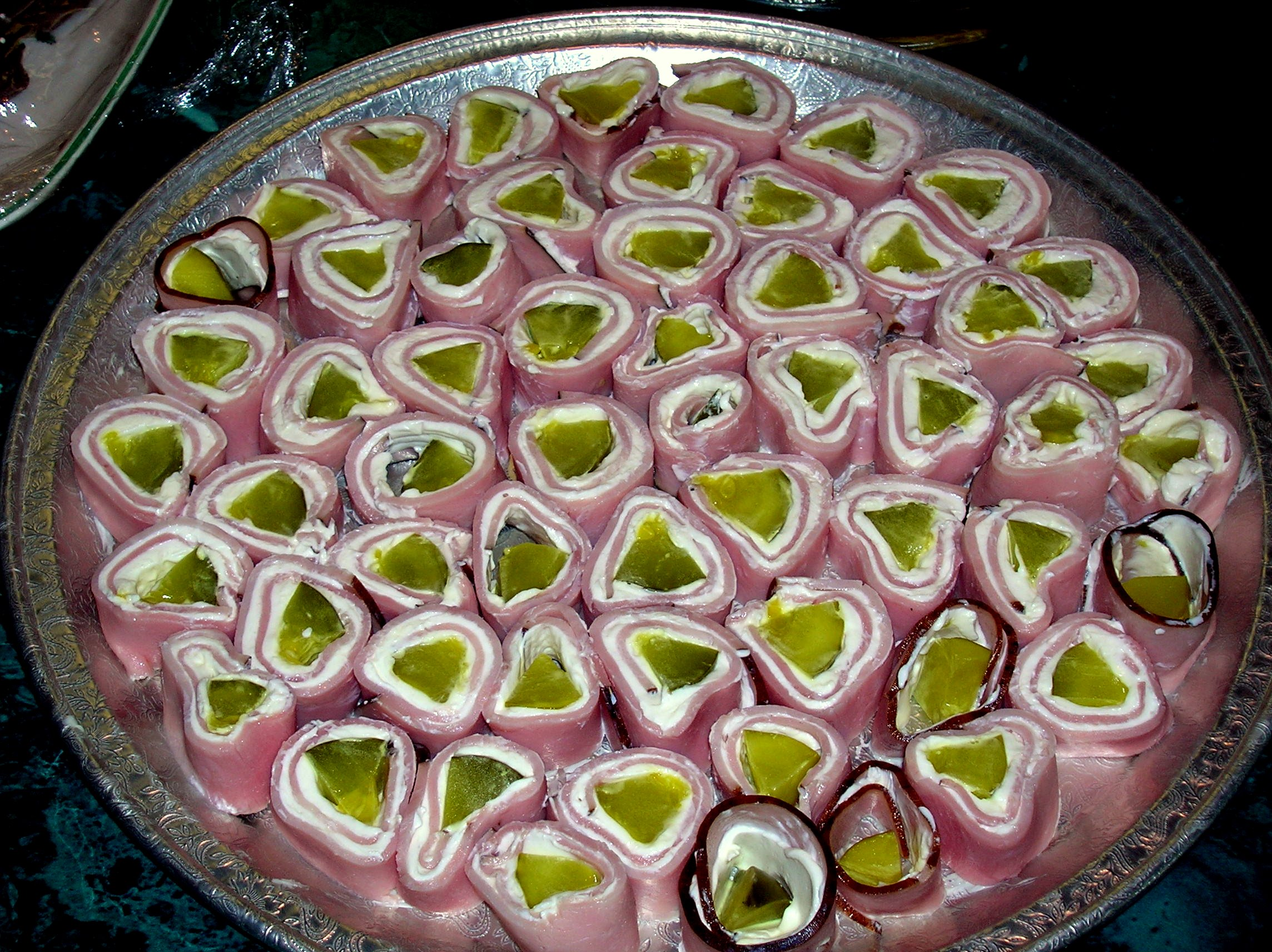
Minnesota sushi

== Drinks ==
- Craft root beer - numerous brands exist in Minnesota such as Killebrew, 1919, Lift Bridge, and Northern Craft Root beer
- Swedish egg coffee is a drink made with coffee grounds mixed with and egg in boiling water. Rarely served outside Minnesota.

=== Alcoholic ===
- Bootlegger cocktail, invented in Minnesota and remains popular today. The cocktail is made with bootleg mix (a mix of water, sugar, and lime juice), vodka, club soda, and mint leaves and lime wedges for garnish.
- Akvavit
- Minnesota wine
- Ice wine
- Minnesota Slammer, a popular cocktail in Minnesota, is made with cherry brandy, bitters, peach and sour apple schnapps, and lemon-lime soda.
- Minnesota Martini, light beer served with olives in a martini glass.
- Bloody Marys are commonly served with a sidecar of beer throughout the Midwest
