= Iron Range cuisine =

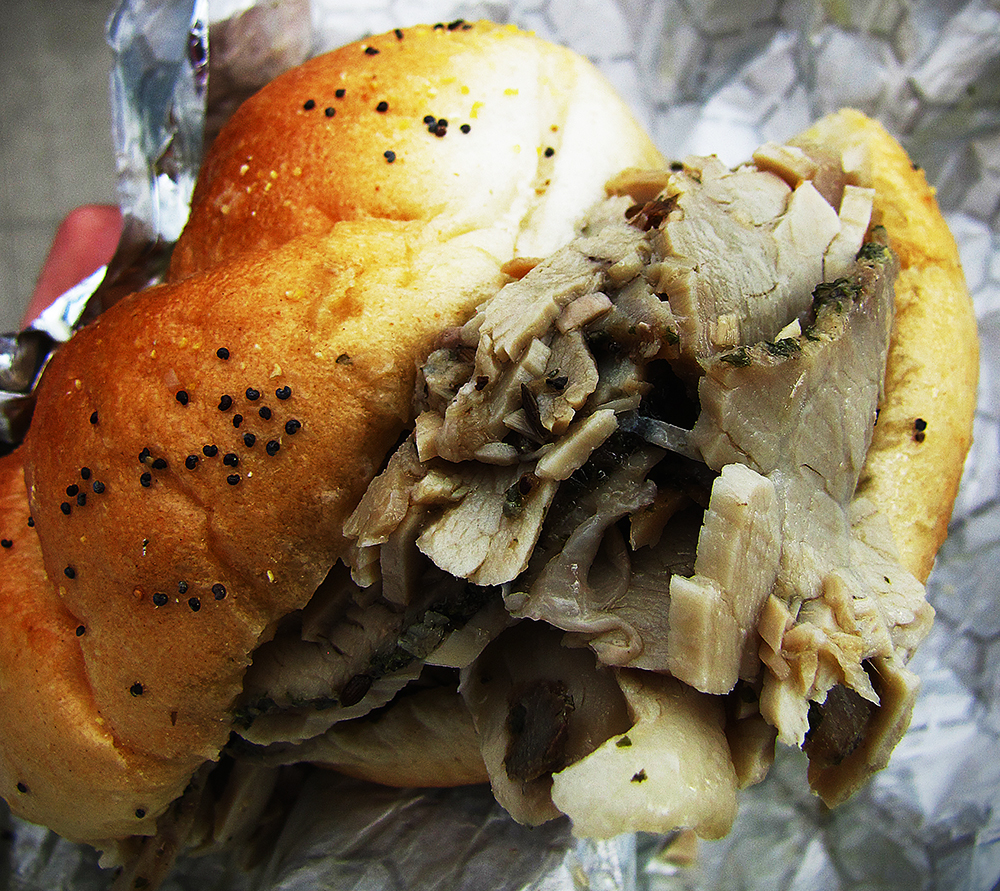
A porketta sandwich, a well known food of the range.

Iron Range cuisine refers to the cooking traditions and dishes of the Iron Range of Minnesota. Iron Range cuisine is based on Canadian, German, Italian, Cornish, Scandinavian, and Slovenian cuisine. Many of the dishes were brought by immigrants. Other dishes were invented by the iron mine workers because they needed nourishing foods that they could bring on the go. Many of the dishes of the Iron Range lost their association with their national origin.

Iron Range foodways are distinct from the rest of Minnesota.

== The three Ps of Iron Range Cuisine ==
The three Ps of Iron Range Cuisine refers to potica, pasty, and porketta. These are the most famous of Iron Range dishes and are referred to as the three Ps because the beginning of each dish's name is a P.

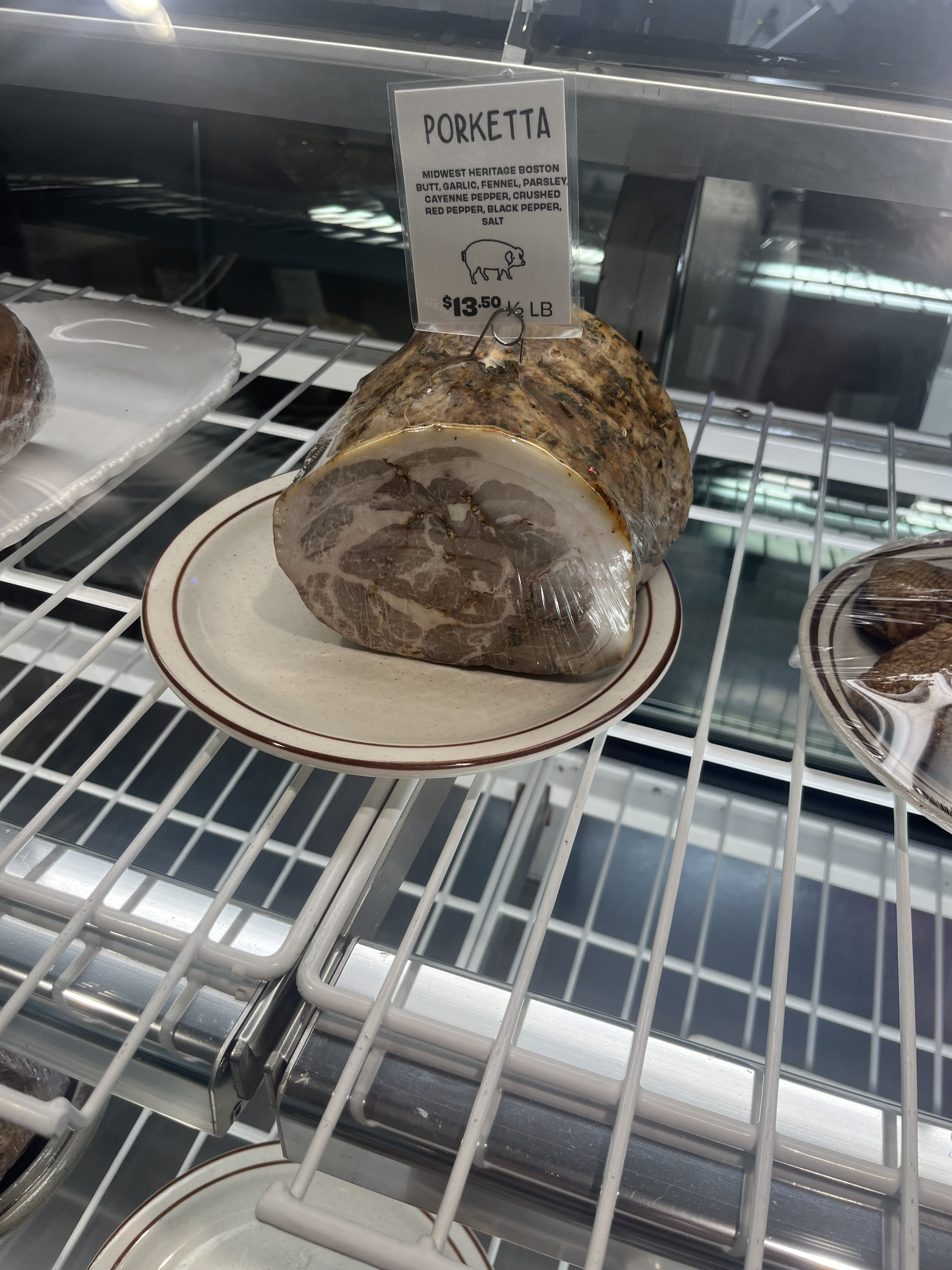
An uncooked porketta roast at a deli

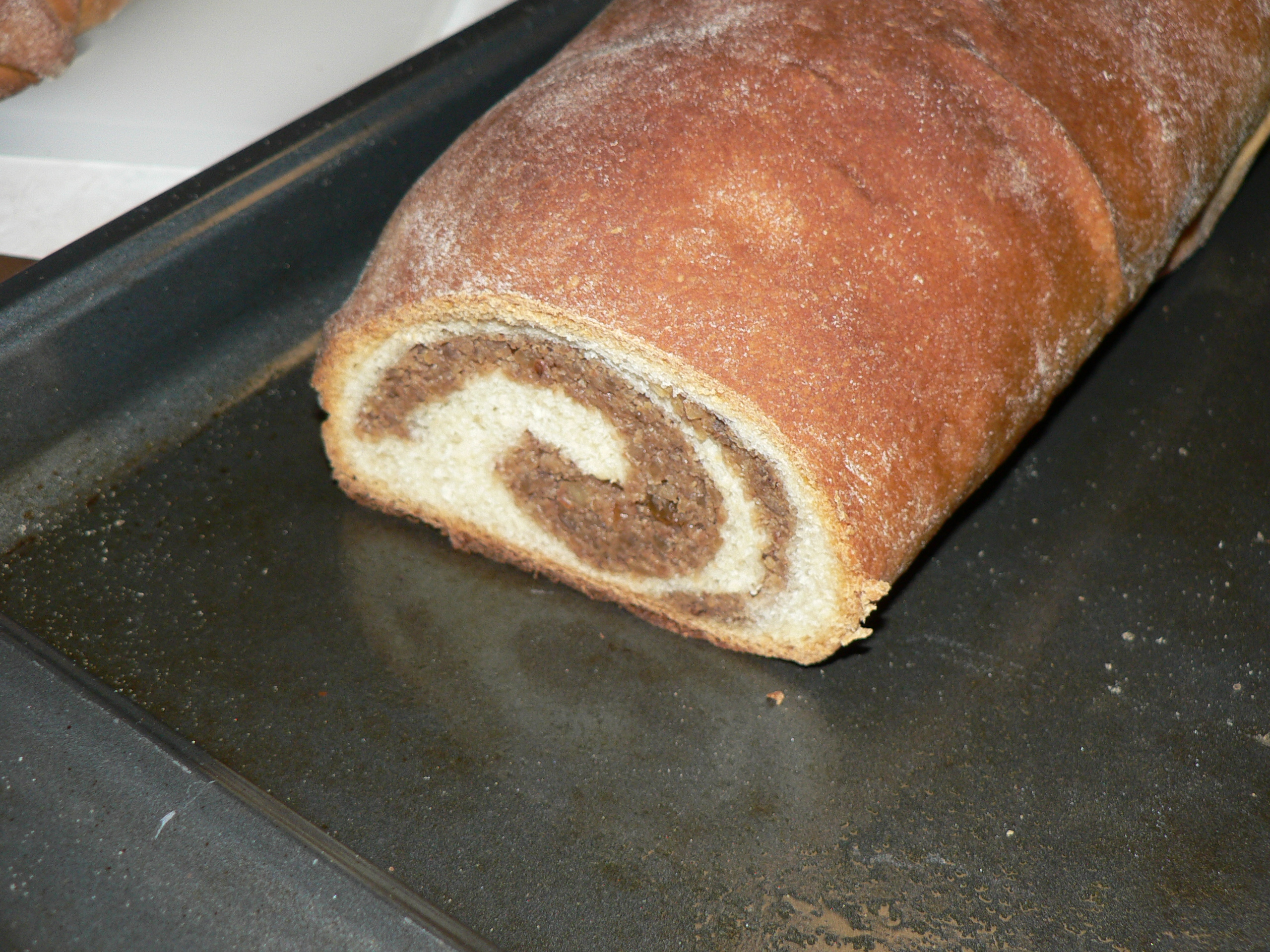
A potica loaf

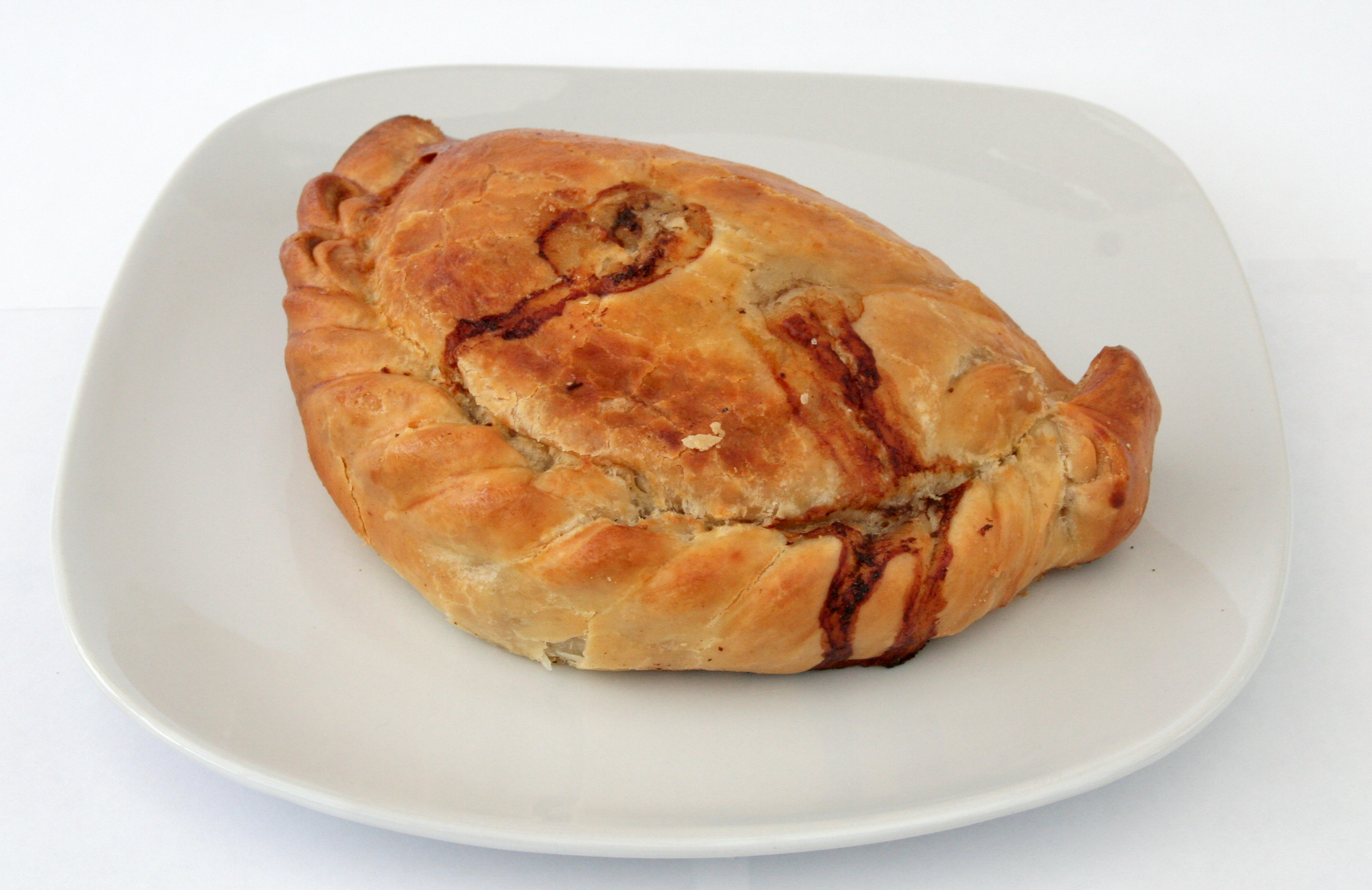
A Cornish pasty

== Dishes ==
- baklava
- cabbage rolls- a dish consisting of cooked cabbage leaves stuffed with a variety of fillings; sarma, which uses a meat stuffing, is one such variant.
- lasagna
- potica- a rolled pastry made of leavened paper-thin dough filled with any of a great variety of fillings, but most often with walnut filling.
- Pasties- It is made by placing an uncooked filling, typically meat and vegetables, in the middle of a flat shortcrust pastry circle, bringing the edges together in the middle, and crimping over the top to form a seal before baking. They are popular in the iron range of Minnesota, especially as a lunch for iron miners.
- sauerbraten
- Porketta sandwich- is a sandwich consisting of slow roasted, season pork. It is served on a sandwich with greens (rapini or spinach) and provolone cheese.
- Iron Range Porketta- pork dish seasoned with fennel and garlic. It remains a popular local dish in towns such as Hibbing, Minnesota with distributors such as Fraboni Sausage.
- South American sandwich- This sandwich was invented in the iron range of Minnesota. It is a bar snack made with several kinds of minced meat, onions, tomatoes, peppers, celery and other leftovers in between two slices of bread.
- Iron Range pot roast- a pot roast made with porketta, potatoes, and onions.
- Strudel
- Finnish fish soup
- Walleye chowder

== Outside the Iron Range ==
The Iron Ranger, a restaurant in St. Paul, serves foods associated with the Iron Range. Dishes associated with the Iron Range can be found in nearby Duluth.
