= Porchetta =

Italian pork dish

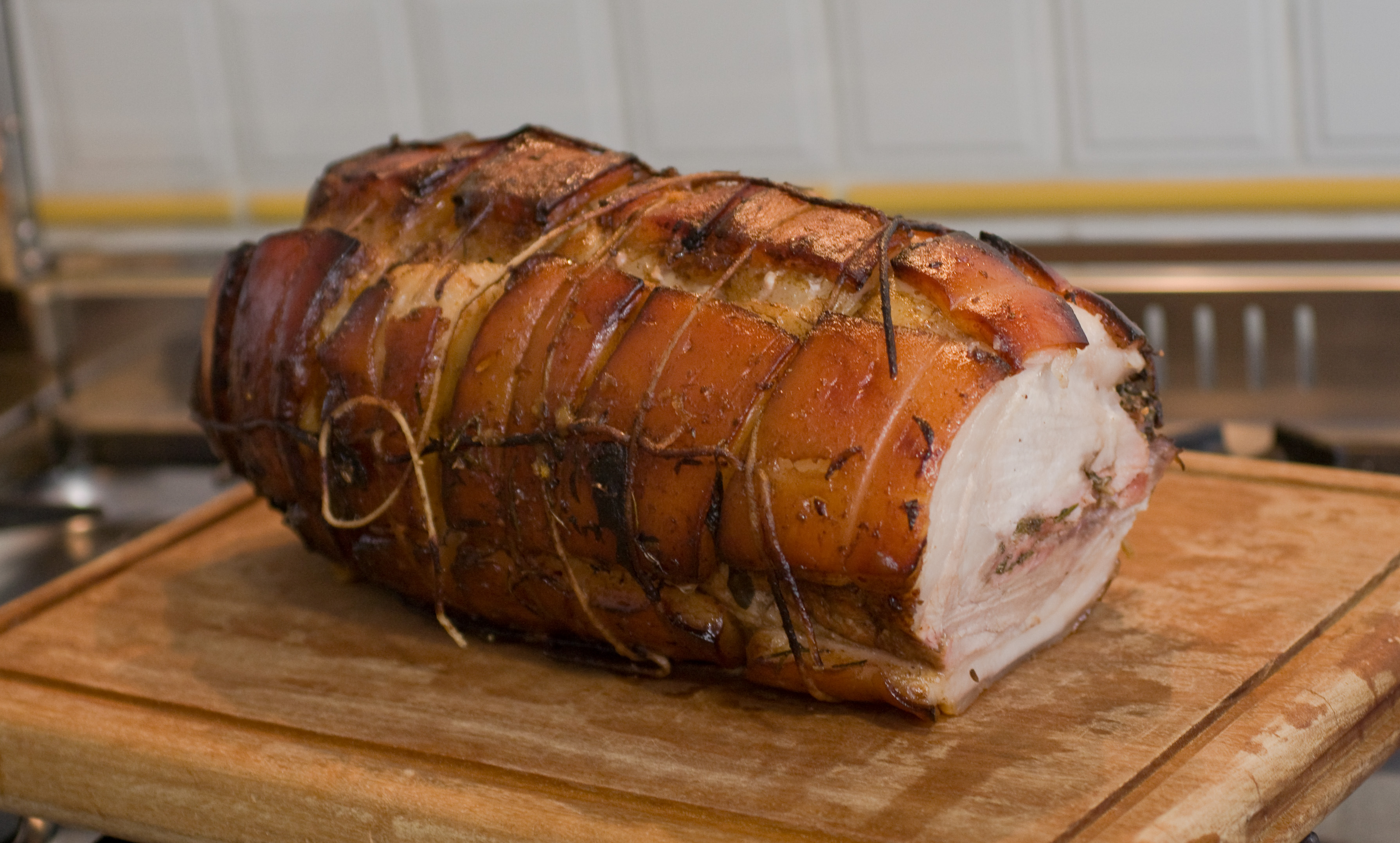
- Place of origin: Italy
- Region or state: Umbria; Abruzzo; Lazio; Tuscany; Emilia-Romagna; Marche; Basilicata; Veneto
- Main ingredients: Pork, rosemary, garlic, pepper

Porchetta (Italian: [porˈketta]) is a savory, fatty, and moist boneless pork roast of Italian culinary tradition. The carcass is deboned and spitted or roasted traditionally over wood for at least eight hours, fat and skin still on. In some traditions, porchetta is stuffed with liver and wild fennel, although many versions do not involve stuffing. Porchetta is usually heavily salted and can be stuffed with garlic, rosemary, fennel, or other herbs, often wild. Porchetta has been selected by the Italian Ministry of Agricultural, Food and Forestry Policy as a prodotto agroalimentare tradizionale (PAT), one of a list of traditional Italian foods held to have cultural relevance.

== In Italy ==
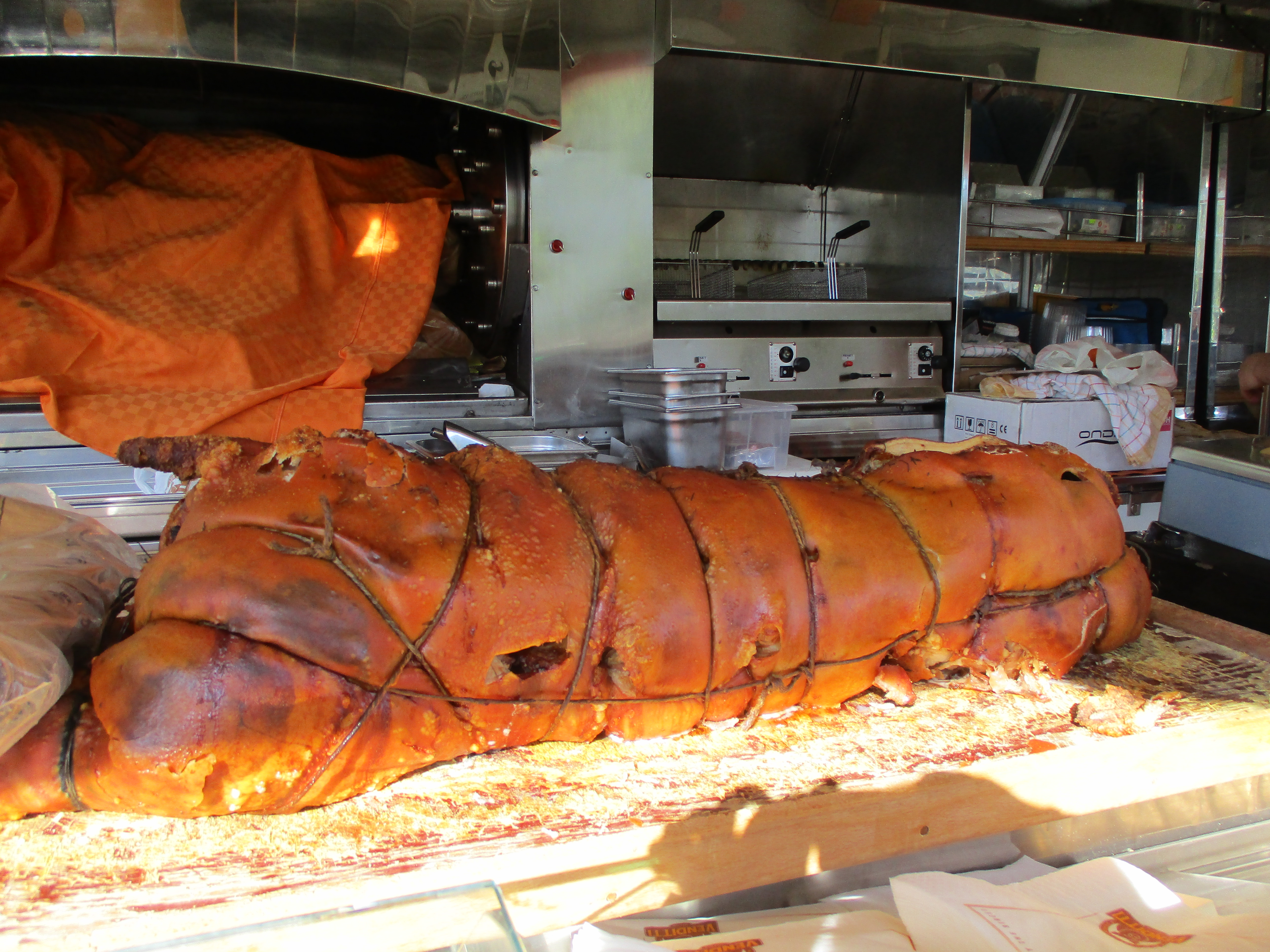
Porchetta from Luco dei Marsi, Abruzzo

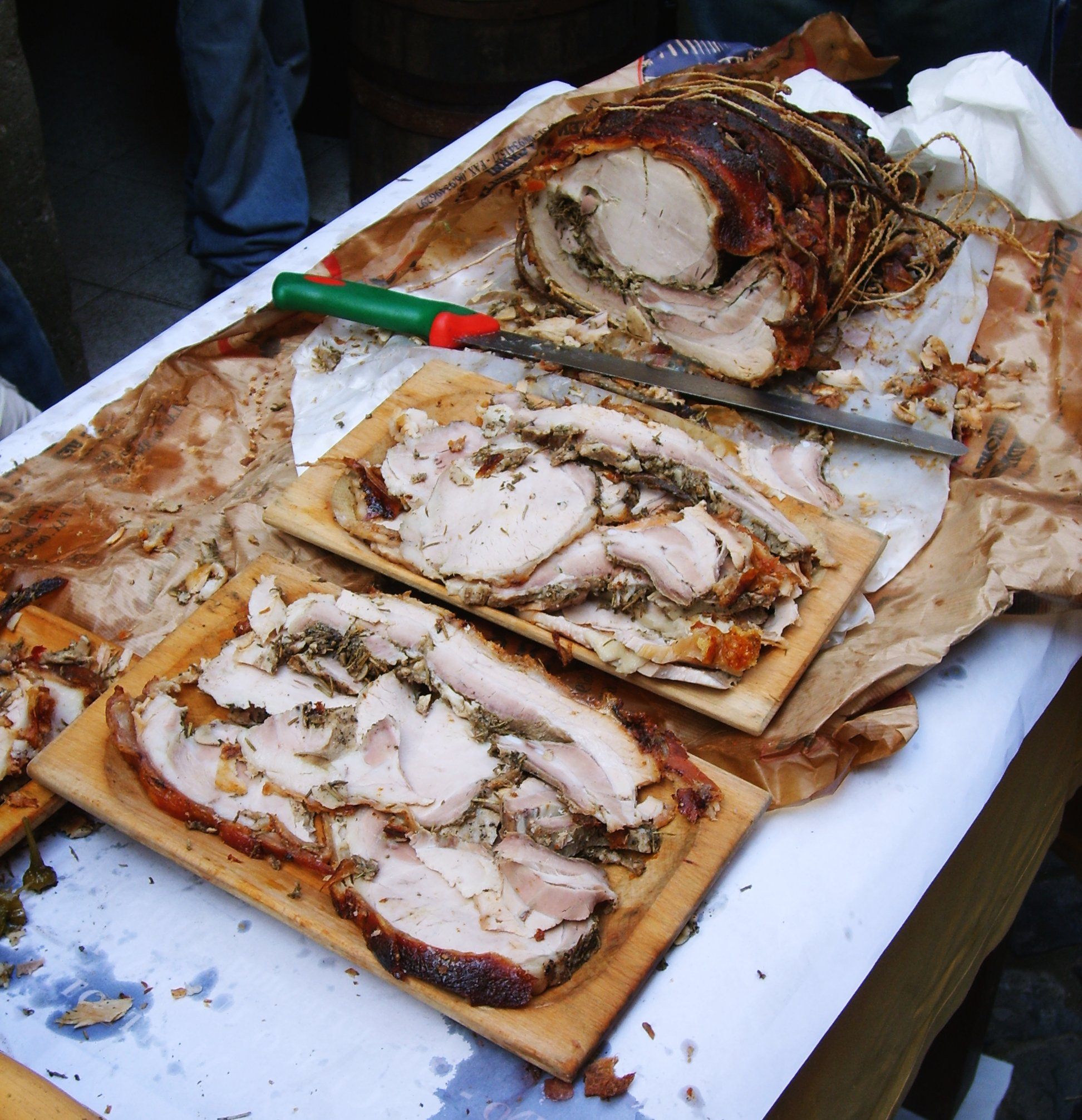
Porchetta, whole and cut in slices, at the Sagra dell'Uva di Marino

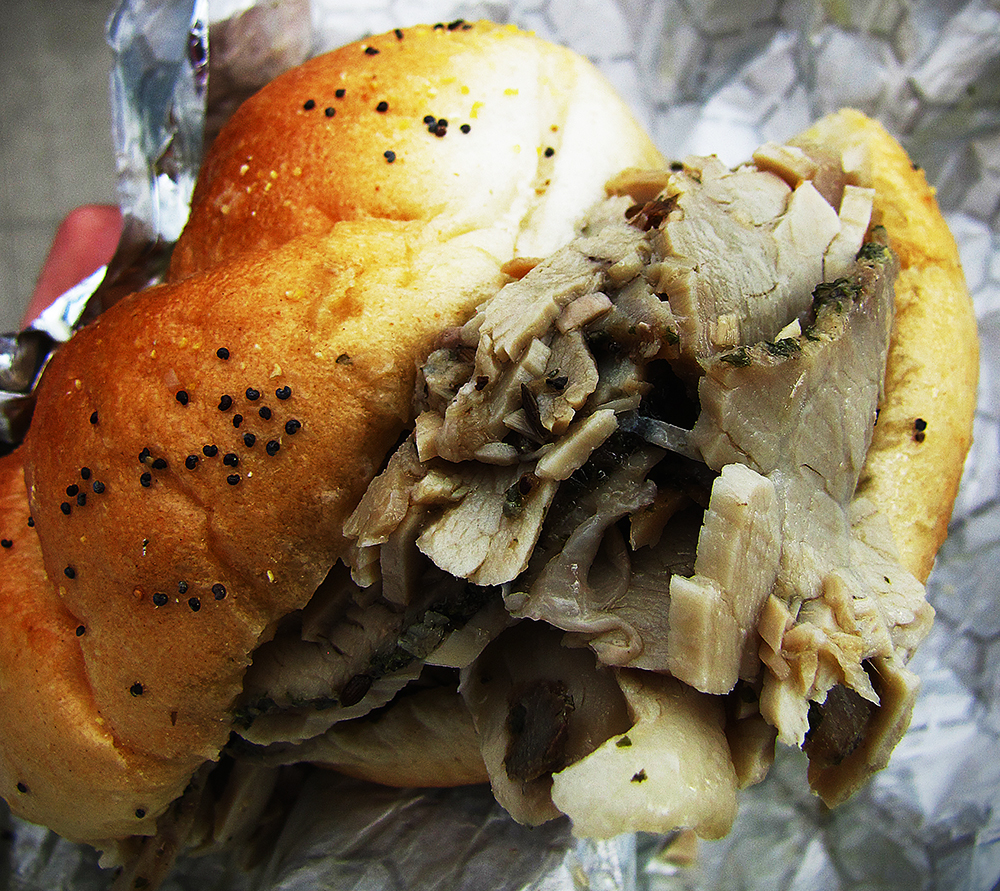
A close-up of a porchetta sandwich

Although popular in the whole country, porchetta originated in central Italy, with Ariccia (in the province of Rome) being the town most closely associated with it. Elsewhere, it is considered a celebratory dish. Across Italy, porchetta is usually sold by pitchmen with their typically white-painted vans, especially during public displays or holidays, and it can be served in a panini. It is a common street food in Rome and Lazio served as a filling for pizza bianca (lit. 'white pizza'). It is also eaten as a meat dish in many households or as part of a picnic.

Porchetta is one of the two iconic culinary products of the Lazio region, the other being sheep cheese pecorino romano. It is also common in Abruzzo. Porchetta abruzzese is generally slow-roasted with rosemary, garlic, and pepper. Porchetta from Umbria is stuffed with the pig's chopped entrails mixed with lard, garlic, salt, and plenty of pepper and wild fennel.

Porchetta trevigiana (from Treviso) was developed in 1919. In it, a pig is killed at one year old, and its meat is stuffed with salt, pepper, wild fennel, garlic, and white wine. It is then roasted inside an oven for seven hours at 90 °C (194 °F). Porchetta is a popular dish today in Venetian cuisine.

The dish is also a staple of Sardinian cuisine. There it is known as porceddu and is roasted over juniper and myrtle wood fires.

== In France ==
Porquette niçoise is registered officially as a typical product of Alpes-Maritimes in the list of dishes of Niçoise cuisine inscribed as intangible cultural heritage of UNESCO.

In the Niçoise tradition, the stuffing is made with the offal of the piglet (heart, liver, kidneys, and sweetbreads), which are blanched before being cut into strips. These offal parts are mixed with pork loin as well as thyme, bay leaves, garlic, and fennel seeds. After being stuffed, the piglet is marinated overnight in white wine before being cooked. During the cooking process, the piglet's skin is brushed with a mixture of water and honey. In the hinterland of Nice, the same recipe is often made with rabbit.

== In North America ==
Porchetta was introduced to North America by Italian immigrants of the early 20th century, especially immigrants from Abruzzo, and is sometimes referred to as "Italian pulled pork", "roast pork", or "Italian roast pork". It is, in many places, served on a sandwich with greens (rapini or spinach) and provolone cheese.

In the Upper Midwest, porchetta, more often spelled porketta, was also introduced by Italian immigrants to the iron ranges of Minnesota and Michigan. Porketta remains a popular local dish in towns such as Hibbing, Minnesota, with distributors such as Fraboni Sausage.

== See also ==
Media related to Porchetta at Wikimedia Commons

- List of stuffed dishes
