= Hot dago =

Sausage sandwich

Hot Dago
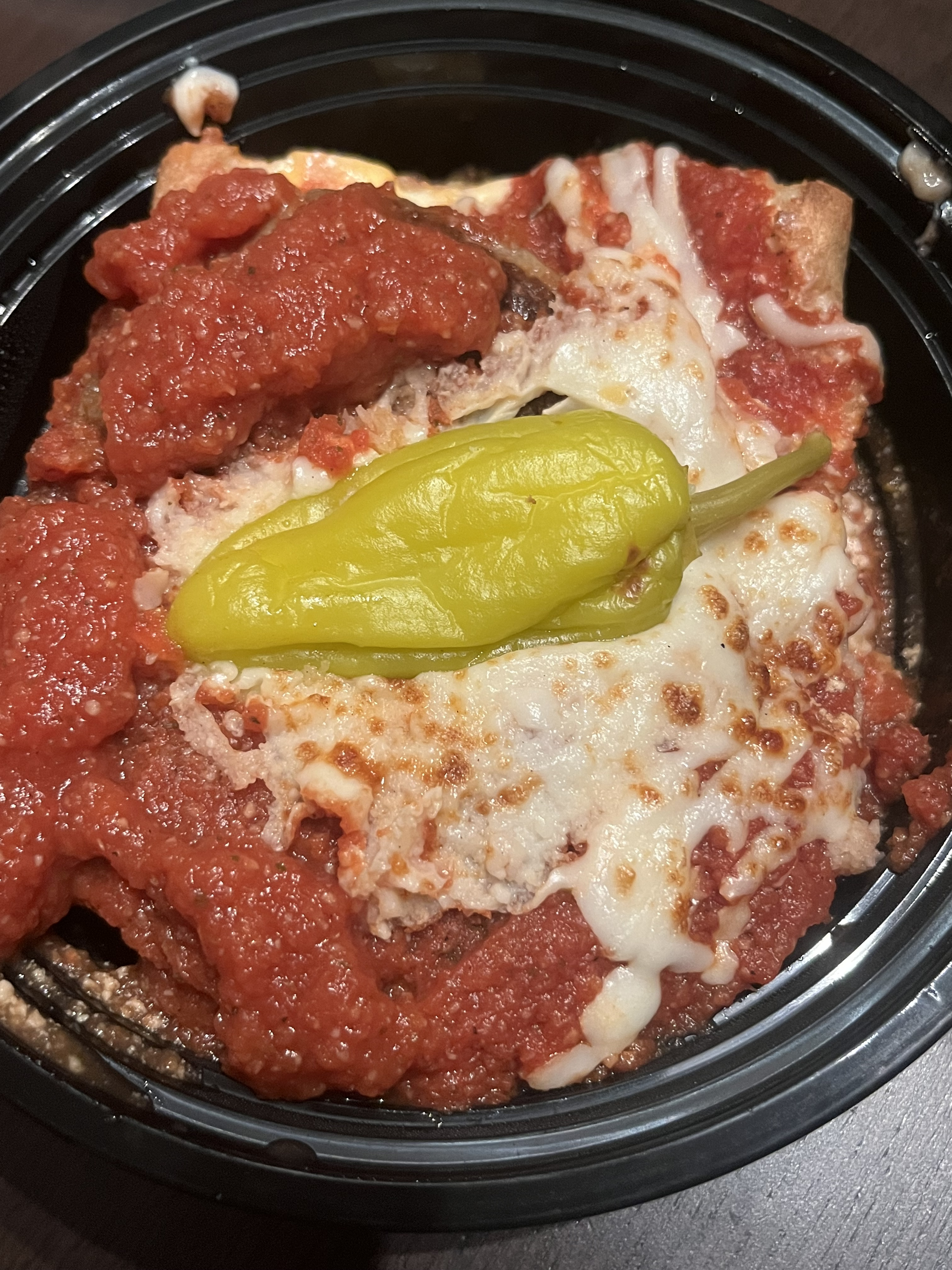
- The inside of a hot dago sandwich with banana peppers, mozzarella cheese, and marinara sauce
- Alternative names: Hot Italiano, hot paisano
- Type: sandwich
- Course: Main course
- Place of origin: Minnesota
- Region or state: St. Paul, Minnesota, US
- Serving temperature: Hot
- Main ingredients: Italian sausage
- Variations: banana peppers, spicy sausage, "sloppy"-style

The hot dago is a sandwich from St. Paul, Minnesota, and is part of Minnesotan cuisine. It consists of an Italian sausage patty, on a burger bun, ciabatta or hard roll, but can also include provolone, marinara sauce, and mozzarella cheese. The sandwich has numerous variations; in its simplest form it is served on a burger bun with just the patty. A slice of provolone cheese can be added like a cheeseburger. Additionally, spicy variations exist which include a spicy patty or banana peppers. A sloppy hot dago is one that is completely covered in marinara sauce; this variation is usually served on a hard roll and has melted mozzarella cheese on top. An open-faced variation also exists.

== Controversies ==
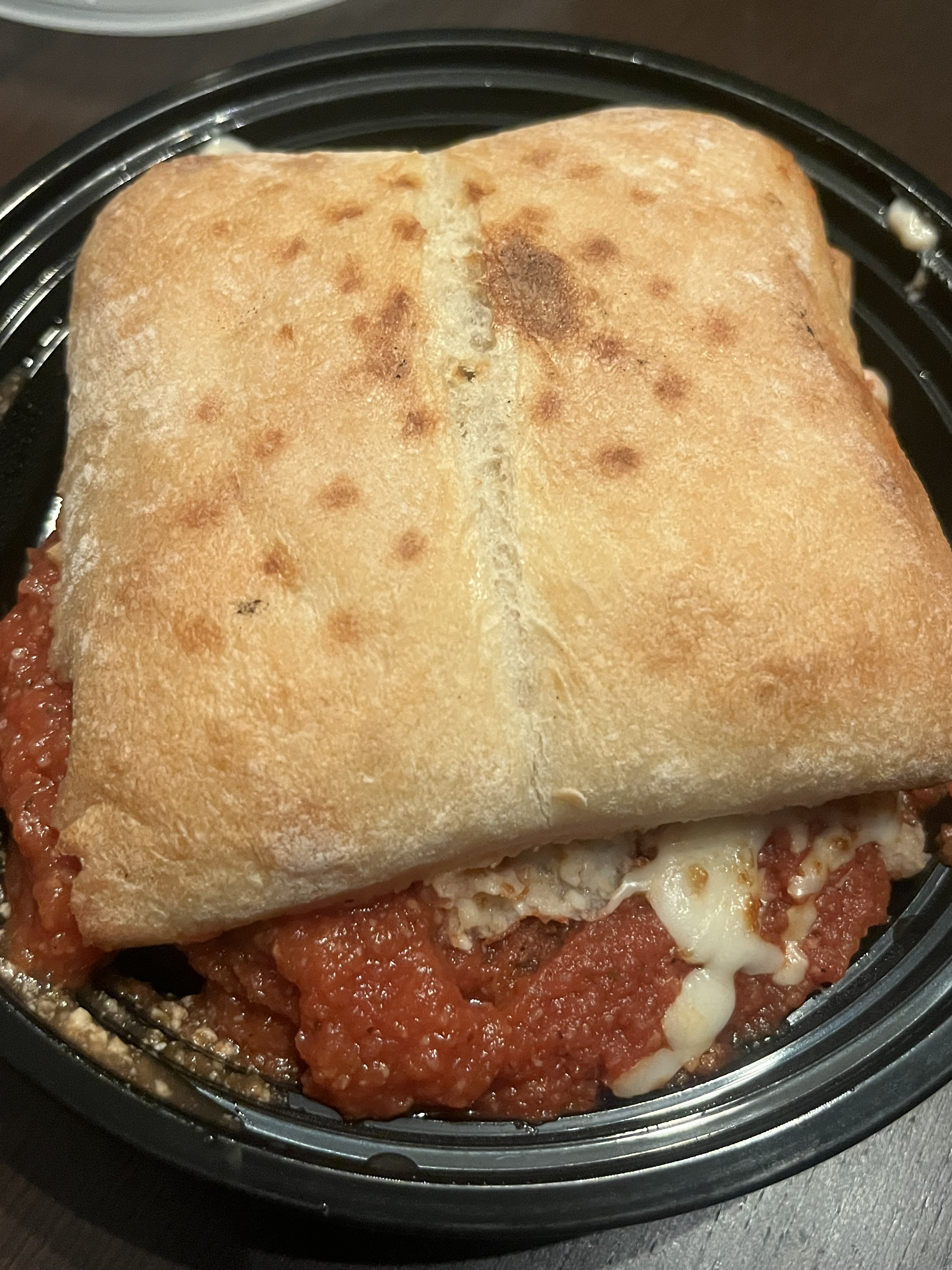
Hot dago on ciabatta

The sandwich has some controversies surrounding its name because it was named after a slur for Italian immigrants. This has led some establishments to rename the sandwich to hot Italiano or hot paisano.

In 2007 the director of human rights in St. Paul attempted to ban the name "hot dago" through a city ordinance; however, it failed.
