= Porketta =

Pork dish from Minnesota, US

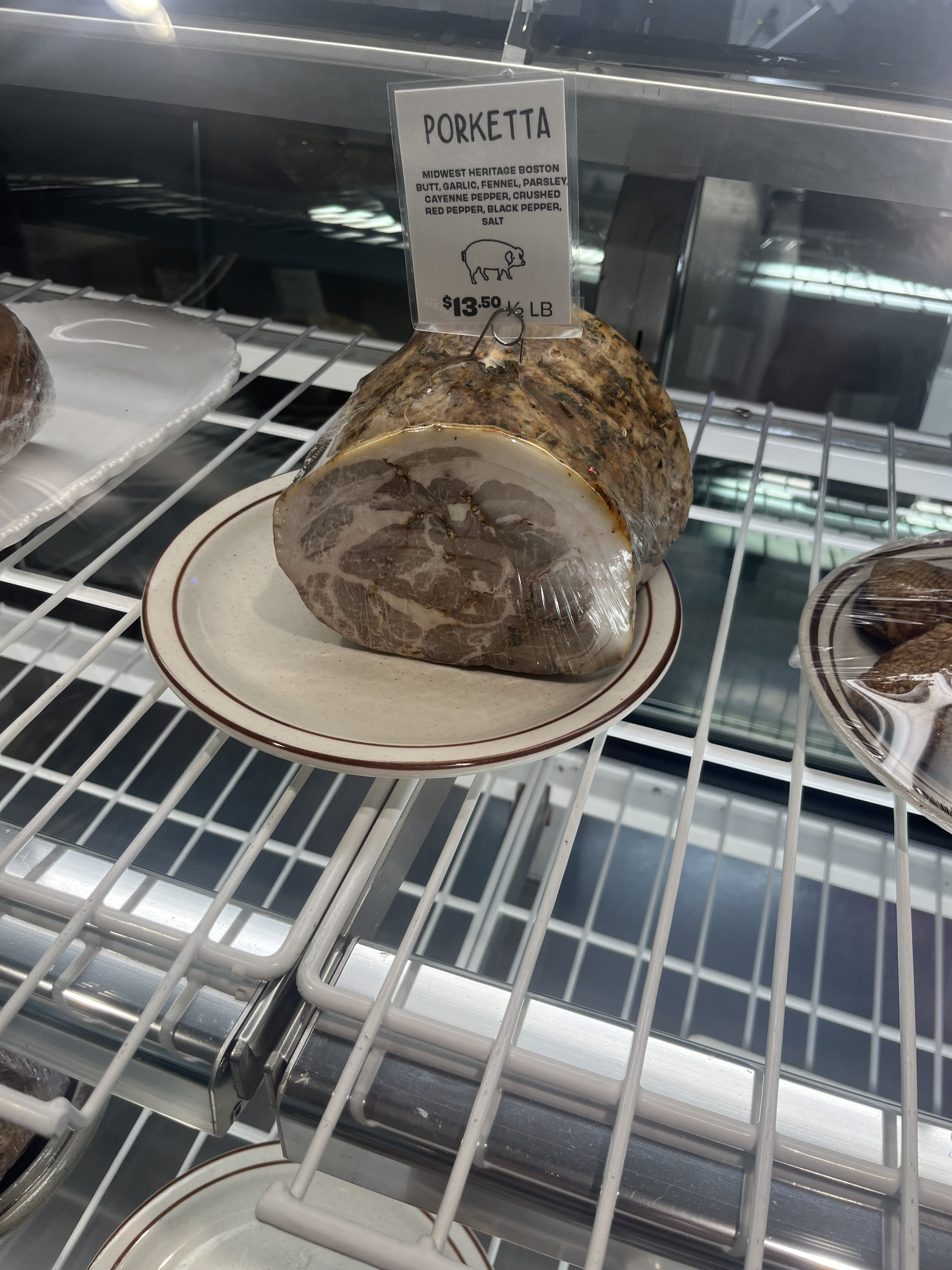
- Course: Main course
- Place of origin: Minnesota
- Region or state: Iron Range
- Serving temperature: Hot
- Main ingredients: Pork, fennel, garlic

Porketta, also known as Iron Range porketta, is a unique type of porchetta hailing from Minnesota. It is an important part of the local cuisine. The dish consists of slow roasted, heavily seasoned pork. It was invented by Italian immigrants in the Iron Range, and was likely created because traditional porchetta ingredients and techniques were not available. Fraboni Sausage in Hibbing, Minnesota, produces porketta. The dish is similar to pulled pork.

== Differences from traditional porchetta ==
=== Cuts of meat ===
Traditional porchetta often uses pork belly with the skin on, while porketta uses pork butt or pork shoulder. Additionally, porketta is usually butterflied and rolled.

=== Seasonings ===
Porketta always uses fennel and garlic, while Italian porchetta uses a wide variety of seasonings and sometimes stuffs the pig with liver.

=== Cooking methods ===
Italian porchetta is roasted, while porketta can baked in a Dutch oven, or cooked in a crockpot.

== Porketta sandwich ==
One of the most popular ways to enjoy porketta is on a sandwich. Typically placed on ciabatta or a hard roll, it can be served with mustard, banana peppers, roasted red peppers, or provolone cheese, but is commonly served plain.

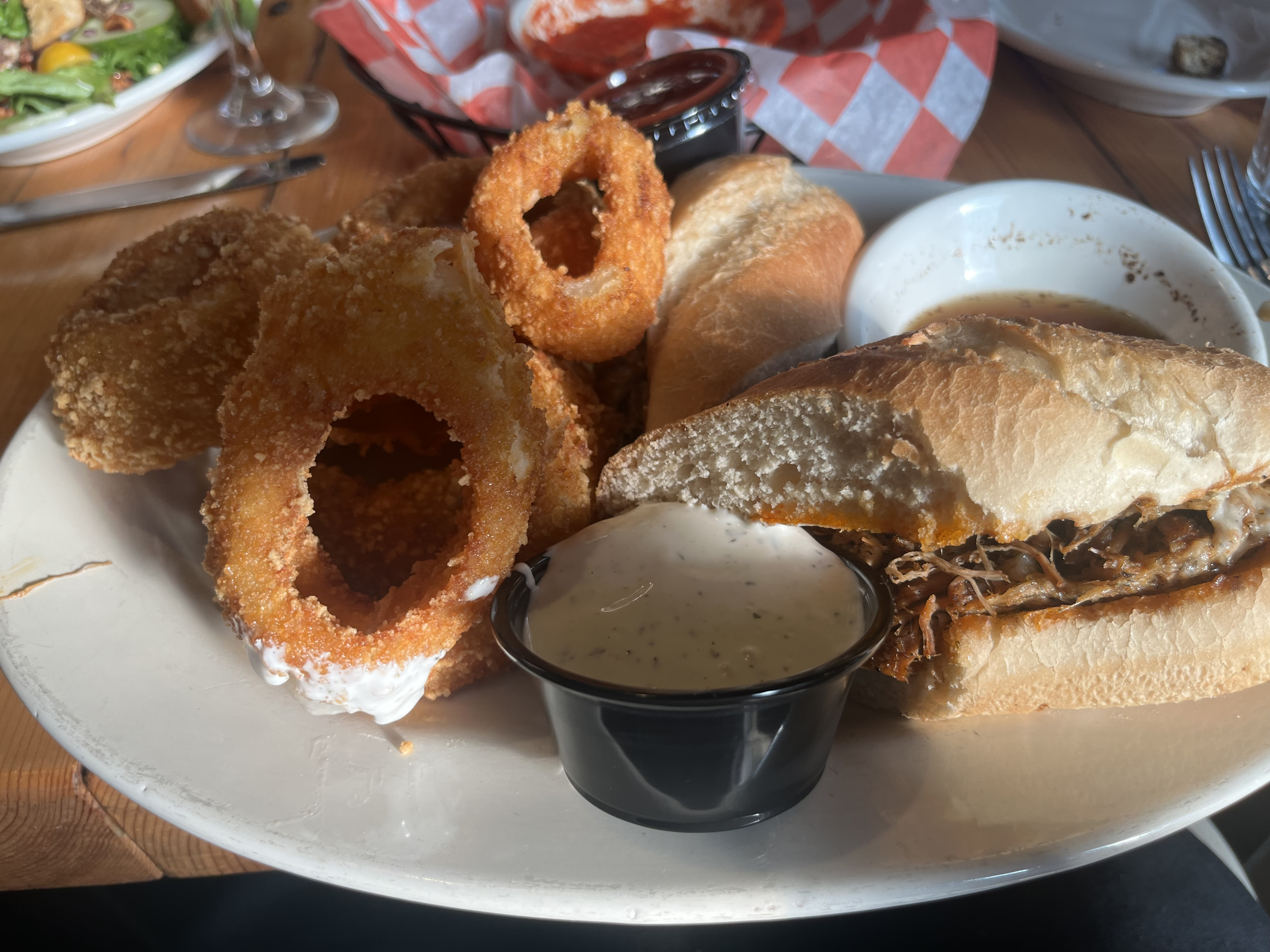
A porketta sandwich served with ranch and onion rings in Duluth, Minnesota

== Iron Range pot roast ==
Another popular way to serve porketta is the iron range pot roast, this consists of porketta cooked in a crock pot, and served with mashed potatoes.
