= Killebrew Root Beer =

Brand of American root beer

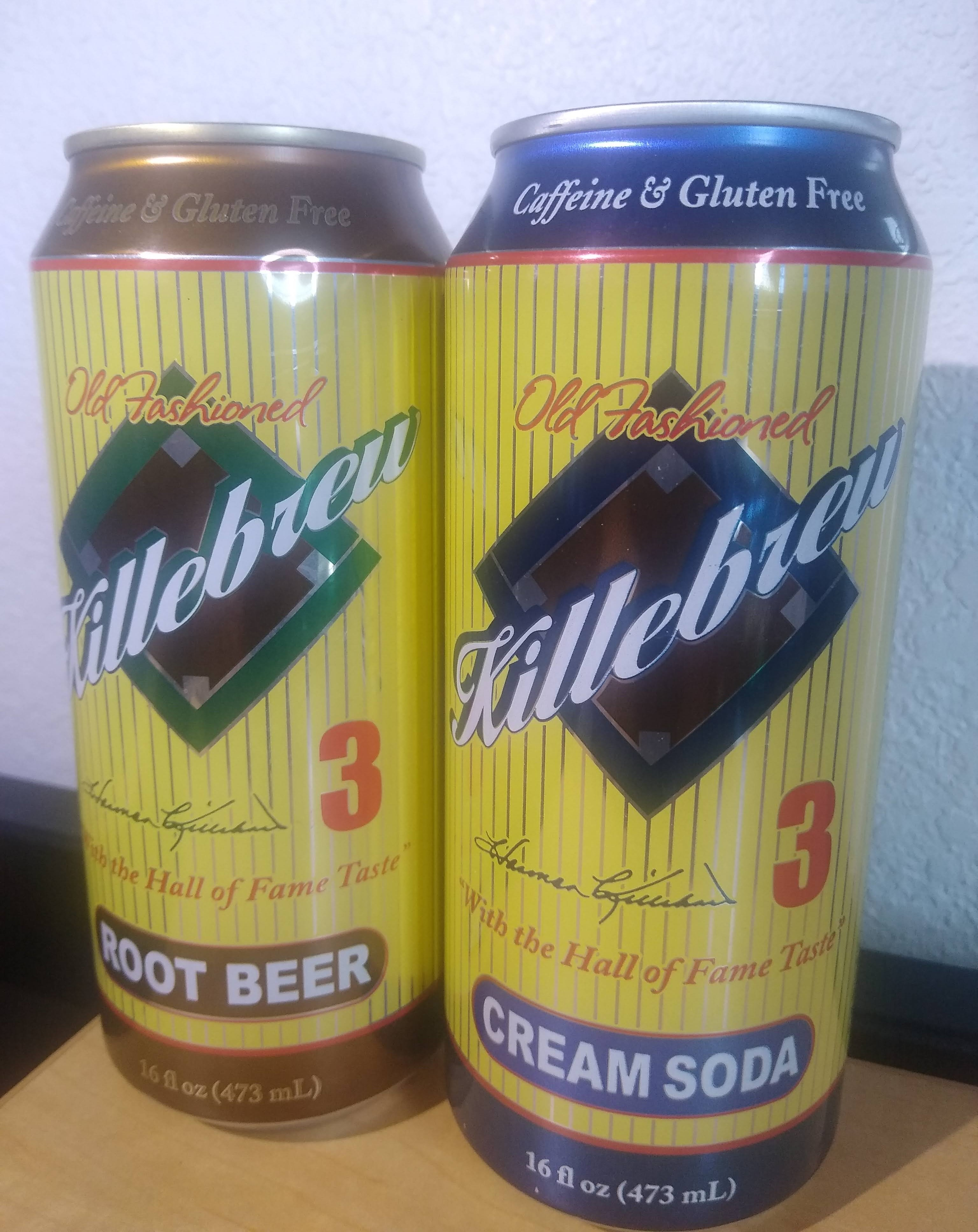
- Killebrew Root Beer and Cream Soda in tallboy cans
- Type: Root Beer
- Manufacturer: Cold Spring Brewing Company
- Distributor: RJM Distributing
- Introduced: 1996
- Ingredients: carbonated water, high fructose corn syrup, honey, caramel color, natural & artificial colors, citric acid

Killebrew Root Beer is a root beer beverage produced with the endorsement of former Minnesota Twins and Washington Senators baseball player Harmon Killebrew and is currently sold by RJM Distributing. The beverage is sold in 12 fl-oz glass bottles and tallboy 16 fl-oz cans covered in flat retro branding featuring a baseball diamond, a reproduction of Killebrew's signature, his retired number 3, "Old-Fashioned" branding, and the slogan, "With the Hall of Fame Taste", alluding to Killebrew's 1984 induction into the National Baseball Hall of Fame. The pinstripes pay homage to the pattern's presence on home uniforms for the Washington Senators and Minnesota Twins worn during the majority of Killebrew's MLB career, until a redesign in 1972. The company also sells a cream soda under similar branding.

Killebrew Root Beer is advertised as being sweetened with Minnesota honey. The beverages are sold at concessions stands and by roving vendors in the Twins' Target Field, at Hammond Stadium, the Twins' spring training home in Fort Myers, Florida, and at CHS Field, the home of the St. Paul Saints. At Target Field, Killebrew Root Beer is also used in root beer floats at Townball Tavern. In addition, it is sold in several restaurants, grocers, department stores, and convenience stores in Minnesota and the wider Midwest, notably Target, Hy-Vee, Lunds & Byerly's, and Cub Foods.

== History ==
Killebrew has been in production since at least 1996 by Cold Spring Brewing Company in Cold Spring, Minnesota. In 2003, a website was launched for Killebrew Beverages, a company based in Burnsville, Minnesota that offered three flavors: 'Rootbeer' [sic], 'Honey Cream', and 'Honey Lemon'.

According to the 2003 site, the idea of launching a root beer brand can be traced back to 1984, when Harmon Killebrew supposedly received a "commemorative soda can" for being entered into the Baseball Hall of Fame. His son, Ken Killebrew, then "heard him joke, 'We ought to put a brew in this and sell it!'". The old website also claims that Ken started producing the beverage in 1993 based on "an old family recipe for root beer".

Later, Killebrew Root Beer was absorbed into RJM Distributing, based in Ramsey, Minnesota. Cold Spring Brewing Company was sold to a private equity firm in 2017 called Brynwood Partners. The branding relationship with RJM is handled by Ken Killebrew, especially now after his father's death in 2011.

In 2015, RJM Distributing ran a contest campaign to cross-promote the creation of a Harmon Killebrew US postage stamp by offering a chance to win a free year of root beer.
