= Chow mein in Minnesota =

Styles of chow mein from MN, USA

Minnesota is home to two unique styles of chow mein, the Minnesota-style chow mein and the mock chow mein.

== Minnesota-style chow mein ==
Minnesota-style chow mein is made with celery, bean sprouts, and topped with processed chicken. It is topped with crispy noodles similar to lo mein, and served on white rice. Meats used in this style could include ground beef, ground pork, or chicken chunks. It was invented in the 1920s, and was likely invented to cater to the local palate. The dish is actually more similar to chop suey than chow mein.

Several frozen food versions are available in supermarkets in Minnesota and surrounding states via Captain Ken's Foods.

== Mock chow mein ==
Mock chow mein is also known as chow mein casserole and as hotdish chow mein. Mock chow mein is a hotdish baked in a casserole dish with cream soup and ground beef mixed in, it often includes rice as well. It is somewhat common in Lutheran potlucks. Similar to Minnesota-style chow mein, it is topped with crispy noodles.
