= Horseshoe sandwich =

Open-faced sandwich originating in Springfield, Illinois, U.S.

Horseshoe
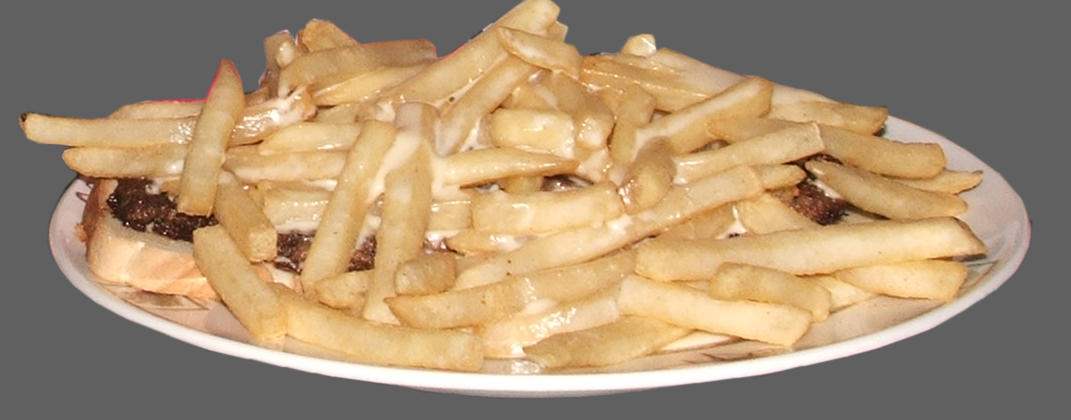
- Horseshoe
- Type: Sandwich
- Place of origin: United States
- Region or state: Central Illinois
- Associated cuisine: United States
- Main ingredients: Toasted bread, hamburger patty, French fries, cheese sauce
- Variations: Breakfast horseshoe, pony shoe

The horseshoe is an open-faced sandwich originating in Springfield, Illinois, United States. It consists of thick-sliced toasted bread (often Texas toast), a hamburger patty or other choice of meat, French fries, and cheese sauce.

While hamburger has become the most common meat on a horseshoe, the original meat was ham. The "horseshoe" name has been variously attributed to the horseshoe-like shape of a slice of bone-in ham, or to the horseshoe-like arrangement of potato wedges around the ham.

It is not uncommon to substitute other meat for the hamburger, such as chicken or ham, or use more than one type of meat. For fries, the preparer may substitute tater tots, waffle fries, or other forms of fried potatoes.

Although cheese sauces vary by chef, it is generally derived from Welsh rarebit. Common ingredients include eggs, stale beer, butter, sharp cheddar cheese, Worcestershire sauce, flour, dry mustard, paprika, salt and pepper, and a dash of cayenne pepper.

A smaller portion, with one slice of bread and one serving of meat, is called a pony shoe.

A breakfast horseshoe is also available. The hamburger and french fries are replaced with sausage or bacon, eggs, and hash browns. The cheese sauce can also be substituted with milk gravy.

Ross' Restaurant in Bettendorf, Iowa, was known for a similar dish called the Magic Mountain before closing permanently in February 2023. Instead of a hamburger patty, the sandwich contains steamed loose meat. It has been enjoyed by politicians and celebrities including Barack Obama and Bette Midler.

== See also ==
- Cuisine of the Midwestern United States
- Hot hamburger plate, a Southeastern open-faced sandwich with fries
- Slinger, a St. Louis diner food
- Gerber sandwich, a St. Louis open-faced sandwich
- St. Paul sandwich, a sandwich from St. Louis, not St. Paul
- Chip butty, a similar sandwich made with French fries
- Mitraillette, another similar sandwich made with fries
- Chopped cheese, sloppy joe, and roti john, select examples of ground beef sandwiches
- Garbage Plate
- Cuisine of St. Louis
- Poutine
- List of regional dishes of the United States
- List of sandwiches

== Works cited ==
- Harmon, Carolyn; Leone, Tony (2019). Springfield's Celebrated Horseshoe Sandwich. The History Press. ISBN 9781467139885.
