= List of American foods =

This is a list of American foods and dishes that have become nationally known. There are a few foods that predate colonization, and the European colonization of the Americas brought about the introduction of many new ingredients and cooking styles. This variety continued expanding into the 19th and 20th centuries proportional to the influx of migrants from other nations.

This list is not exhaustive, nor does it cover every item consumed in the U.S., but it does include foods and dishes that are common in the U.S. (highly available and regularly consumed), or which originated there. The list is representative only. For more foods in a given category, see the main article for that category.

== American foods ==
=== Breads and baked goods ===
- Bagels
- Banana bread
- Biscuit (bread)
- Cornbread
- Cuban bread
- Hard Roll
- Hoagie Roll
- Hot dog bun
- Frybread
- Sopaipilla
- Muffin
- Cupcake
- Sourdough Bread
- sandwich bread
- whole wheat bread
- Marbled Rye Bread
- Cinnamon Raisin Bread

=== Cheese and dairy ===
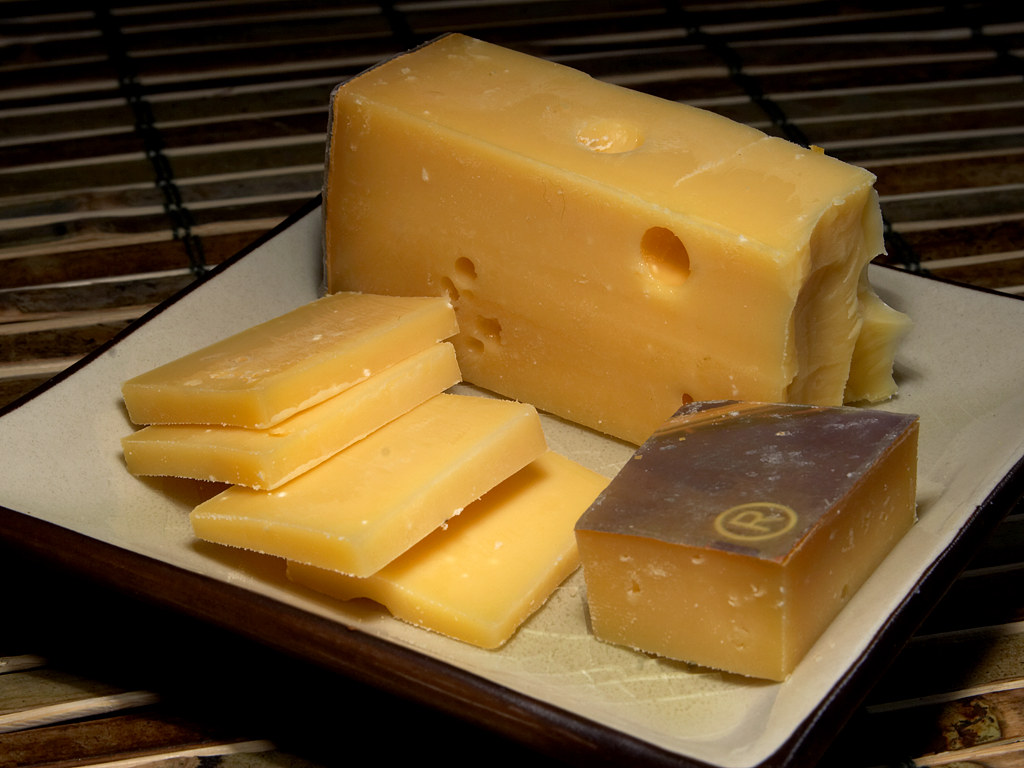
Gouda and Swiss are common cheeses in America.

- Muenster cheese
- American cheese (technically a processed cheese)
- Colby (as well as the blend Colby-Jack)
- Sour cream
- Cream cheese
- Monterey Jack (and used in pepper jack cheese)
- String cheese
- Velveeta (brand name of a common processed cheese)

=== Breakfast ===
- American pancakes
- Biscuits and gravy
- Breakfast burrito
- breakfast sandwich
- Chicken-fried steak
- Corned Beef Hash
- Creamed chipped beef
- Eggs Benedict
- Grits
- Hashbrowns
- porridge
- Strata

=== Vegetables and salads ===
- Coleslaw
- Sweet potato casserole
- Corn on the cob
- Fried green tomatoes
- Fried okra
- Green salad, including Caesar salad, Cobb salad, Green Goddess salad, kale salad, Waldorf salad and chef salad
- New Mexico chile including Hatch Green Chile

=== Main dishes ===
- American chop suey
- Barbecue, including pork ribs, Texas smoked brisket, pulled pork, and barbecue chicken
- Bottboi (see Pennsylvania Dutch pot pie)
- Chicken Nuggets
- Chicken parmesan
- Club sandwich
- Crab cake
- Crayfish
- Hotdish
- Southern fried chicken (see chicken and waffles)
- Lobster
- Maryland blue crab
- Roasted turkey

=== Soups and stews ===
- Chili
- Clam chowder
- Corn chowder
- Gumbo
- Saimin
- Pozole
- tortilla soup

=== Desserts ===
- Bean pie
- Beignet
- Bizcochito
- black and white cookie
- Blondie (confection)
- Chocolate brownie
- Chocolate chip cookies
- Cobbler
- Fudge
- Ice cream
- Jell-O
- Key lime pie
- Oatmeal raisin cookie
- Peanut butter cookie
- Pecan pie
- Pumpkin pie
- Red velvet cake
- Saltwater taffy
- S'more
- Snickerdoodle
- Soft serve
- Sundae
- Twinkies
- Milkshake
- Pineapple upside-down cake
- Doughnut
- Chiffon cake
- Fluff salad

=== Rice dishes ===
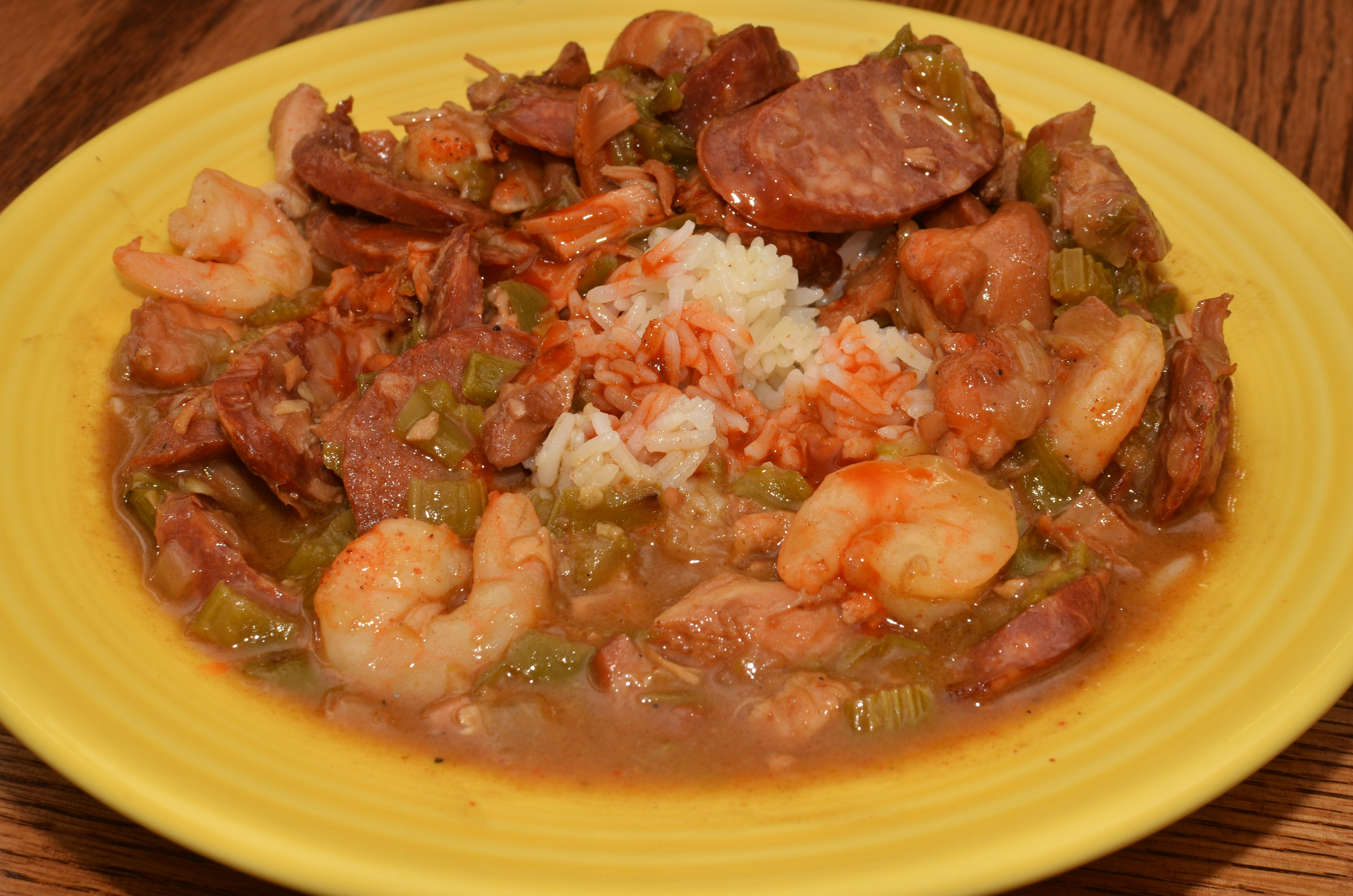
Gumbo is a dish that originated in southern Louisiana during the 18th century.

- Calas
- Charleston red rice
- Chicken bog
- Dirty rice
- Glorified rice
- Gumbo
- Hawaiian haystack
- Hoppin' John
- Jambalaya
- Mexican rice
- Rice and gravy
- Red beans and rice
- Shrimp creole
- Poke (dish)
- California Roll

=== Sandwiches ===
- Avocado toast
- Barbecue sandwich
- BLT
- BLAT (Bacon, Lettuce, Tomato & Avocado)
- Cheesesteak
- Chopped cheese
- Club sandwich
- Corned Beef Special
- Cuban sandwich
- Egg salad sandwich
- Fluffernutter
- French dip
- Green Chile Cheeseburger
- Grilled cheese
- Gobbler (Thanksgiving Sandwich)
- Ham and cheese
- Hamburger
- Hoagie
- Hot dog
- Italian beef
- Lobster roll
- Melt sandwich
- Monte Cristo sandwich
- Muffuletta
- Pastrami on rye
- Peanut butter and jelly sandwich
- Philadelphia Roast Pork Sandwich
- Po' boy
- Reuben sandwich
- Sloppy joe
- St. Paul sandwich

=== Sausages ===
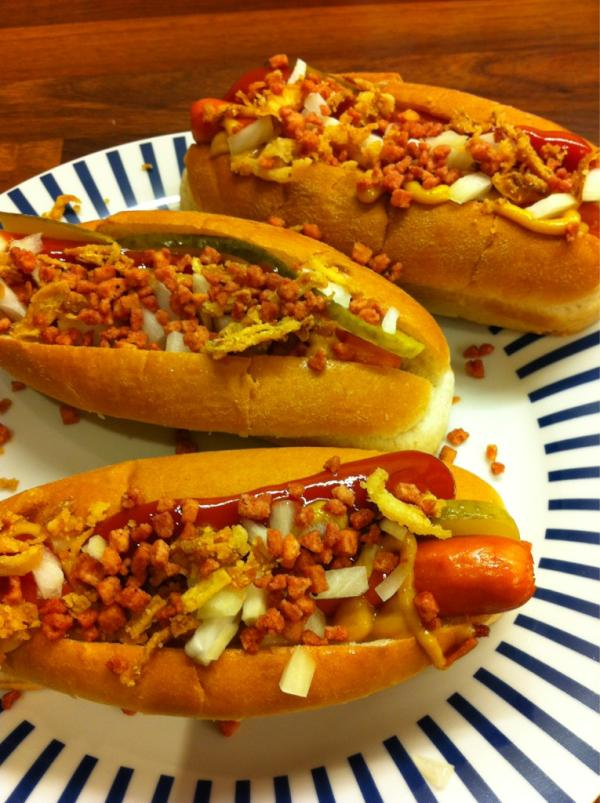
Hot dogs with various toppings

- Bologna sausage
- Breakfast sausage
- Chaudin
- Goetta
- Half-smoke
- Hot link (sausage)
- Italian hot dog
- Lebanon bologna
- Maxwell Street Polish
- Polish Boy
- Chili dog
- Texas Tommy (food)

=== Snacks and side dishes ===
- Artichoke dip
- Boston baked beans
- Buffalo wings
- Curly fries
- Hushpuppy
- Jalapeño popper
- Macaroni and cheese
- Rocky Mountain Oysters
- Waffle fries
- Cheetos
- Chili cheese fries
- Lay's
- Doritos
- Pringles
- Parmesan chips

=== Condiments ===
- Barbecue sauce
- Benedictine (spread)
- Blue cheese dressing
- Old Bay Seasoning
- Cocktail sauce
- Cranberry sauce
- Fry sauce
- Green goddess dressing
- Honey mustard
- Maple syrup
- Mayonnaise
- Old sour
- Pickle relish
- Ranch dressing
- Special sauce
- Tabasco sauce
- Thousand Island dressing
- Tomato ketchup
- Yellow mustard

=== Miscellaneous ===
- Pot liquor

=== Candies ===
- Jolly ranchers
- Sour patch kids
- Skittles
- Hershey's
- M&M's
- Snickers
- Twinkie
- Oreo
- Hubba Bubba
- Airheads (candy)
- Reese's Peanut Butter Cups

== Gallery ==
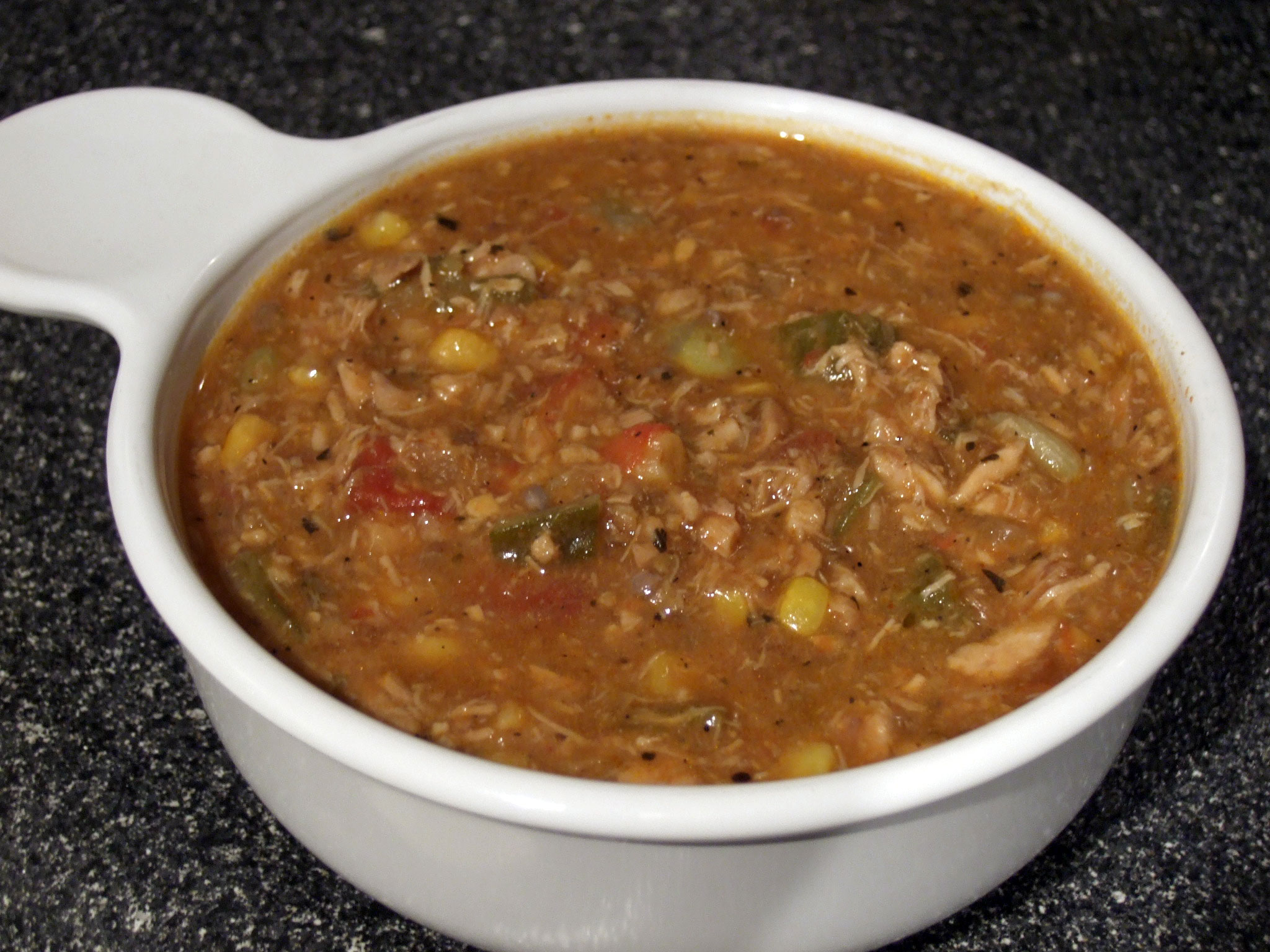
Brunswick stew

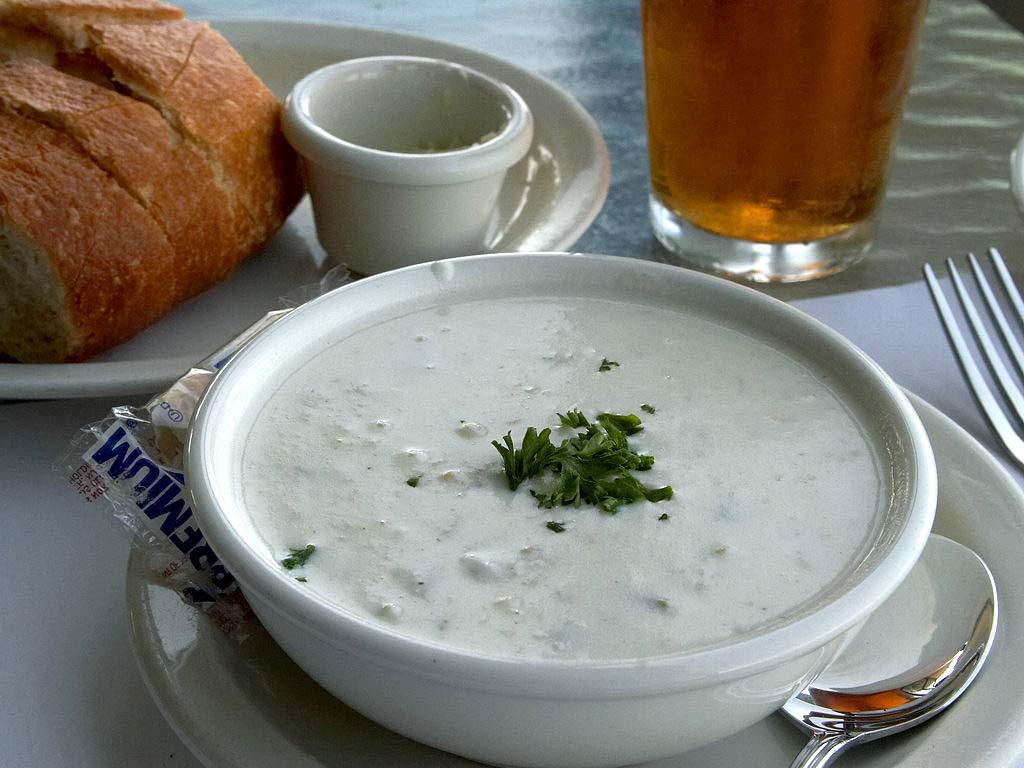
New England clam chowder

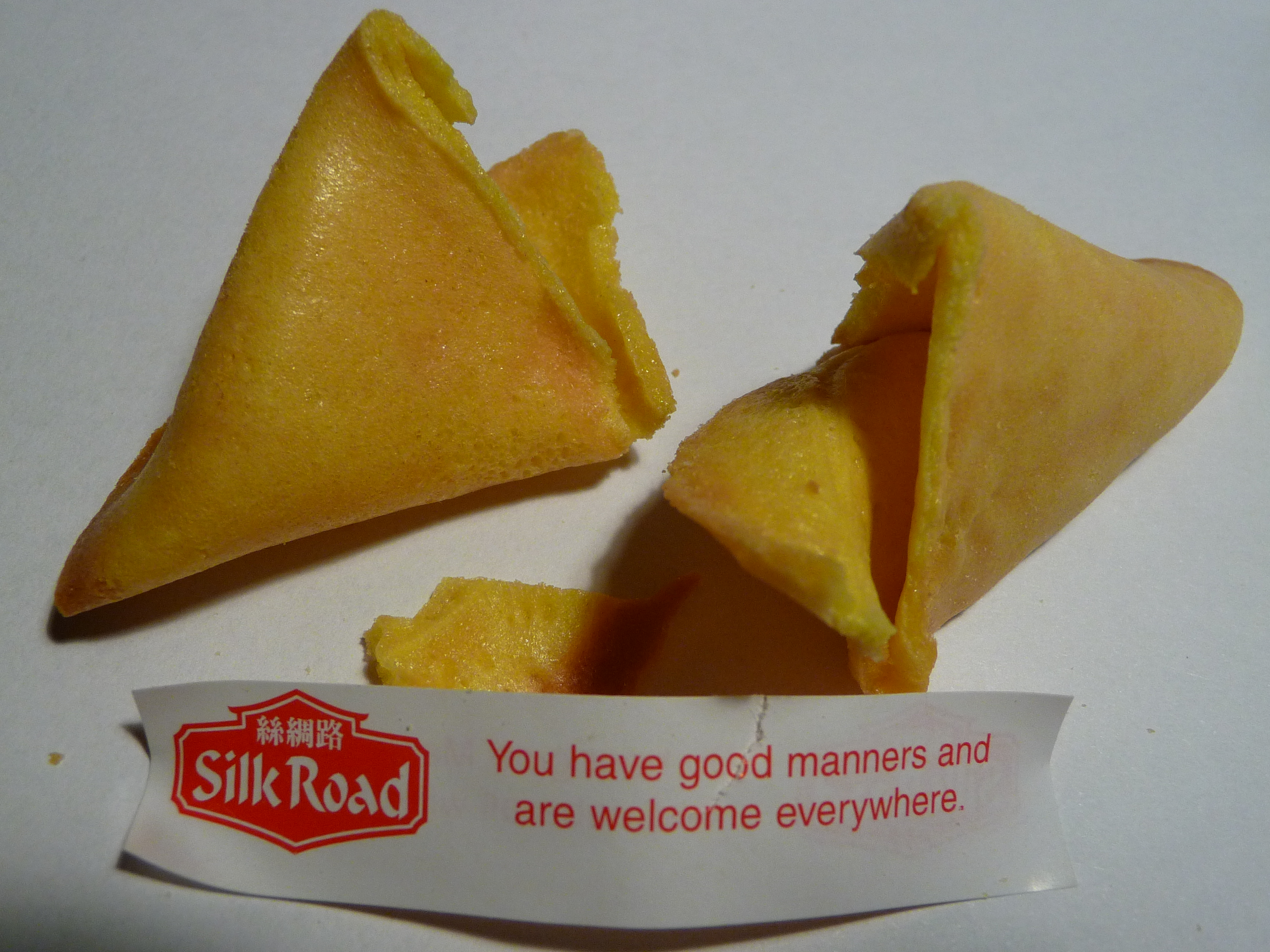
An opened fortune cookie, with the printed fortune that was inside it

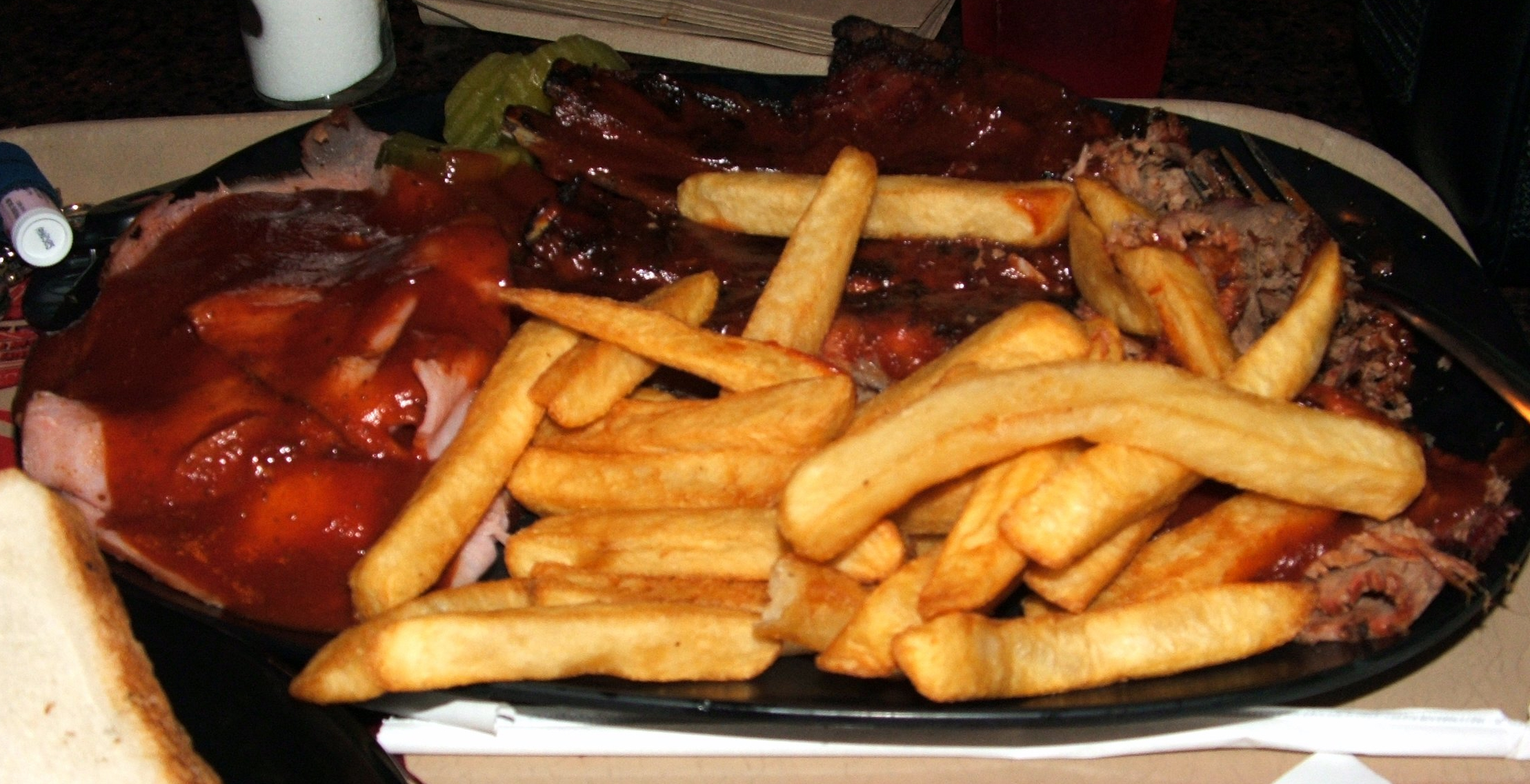
Kansas City–style barbecue

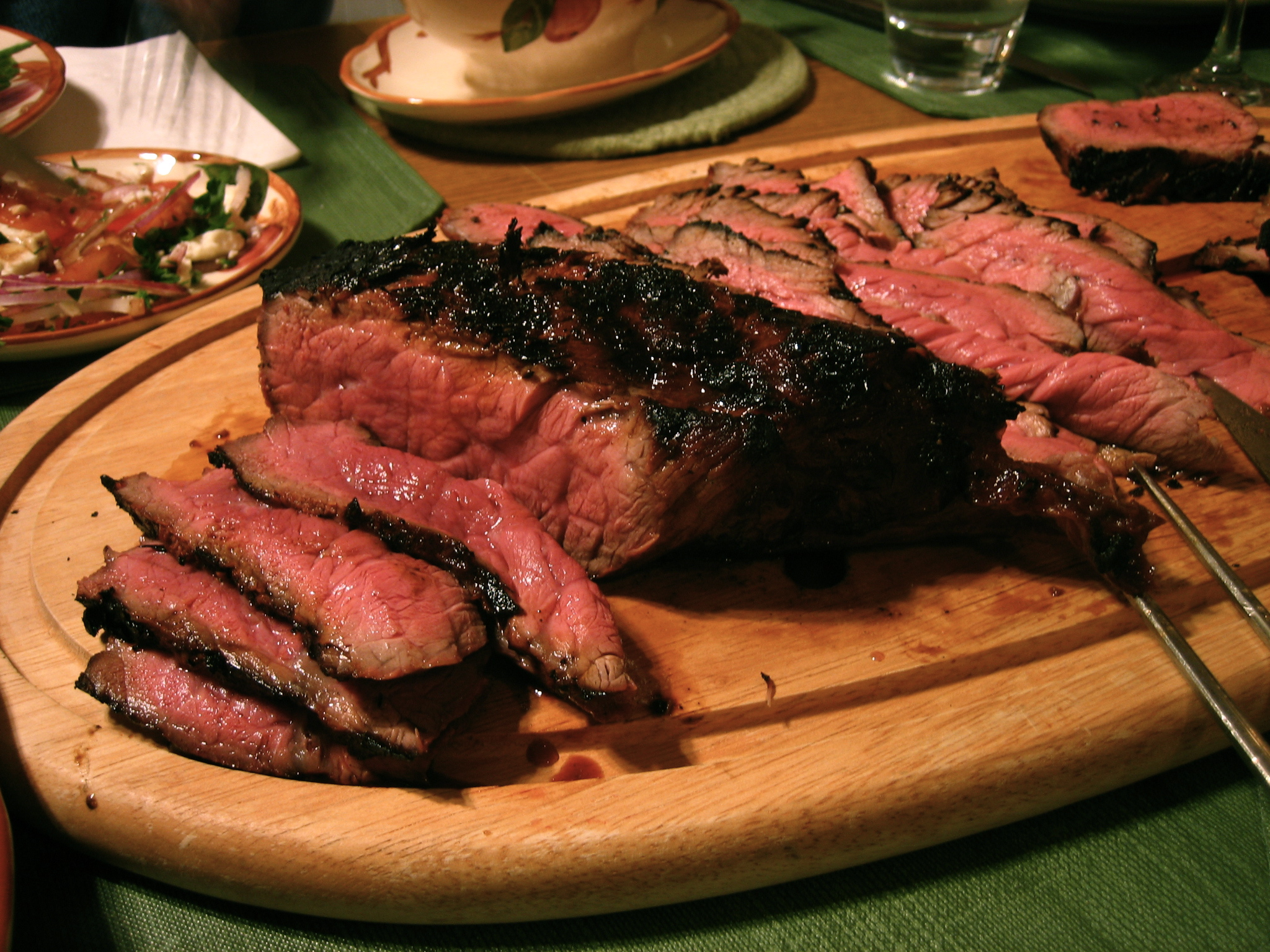
London broil

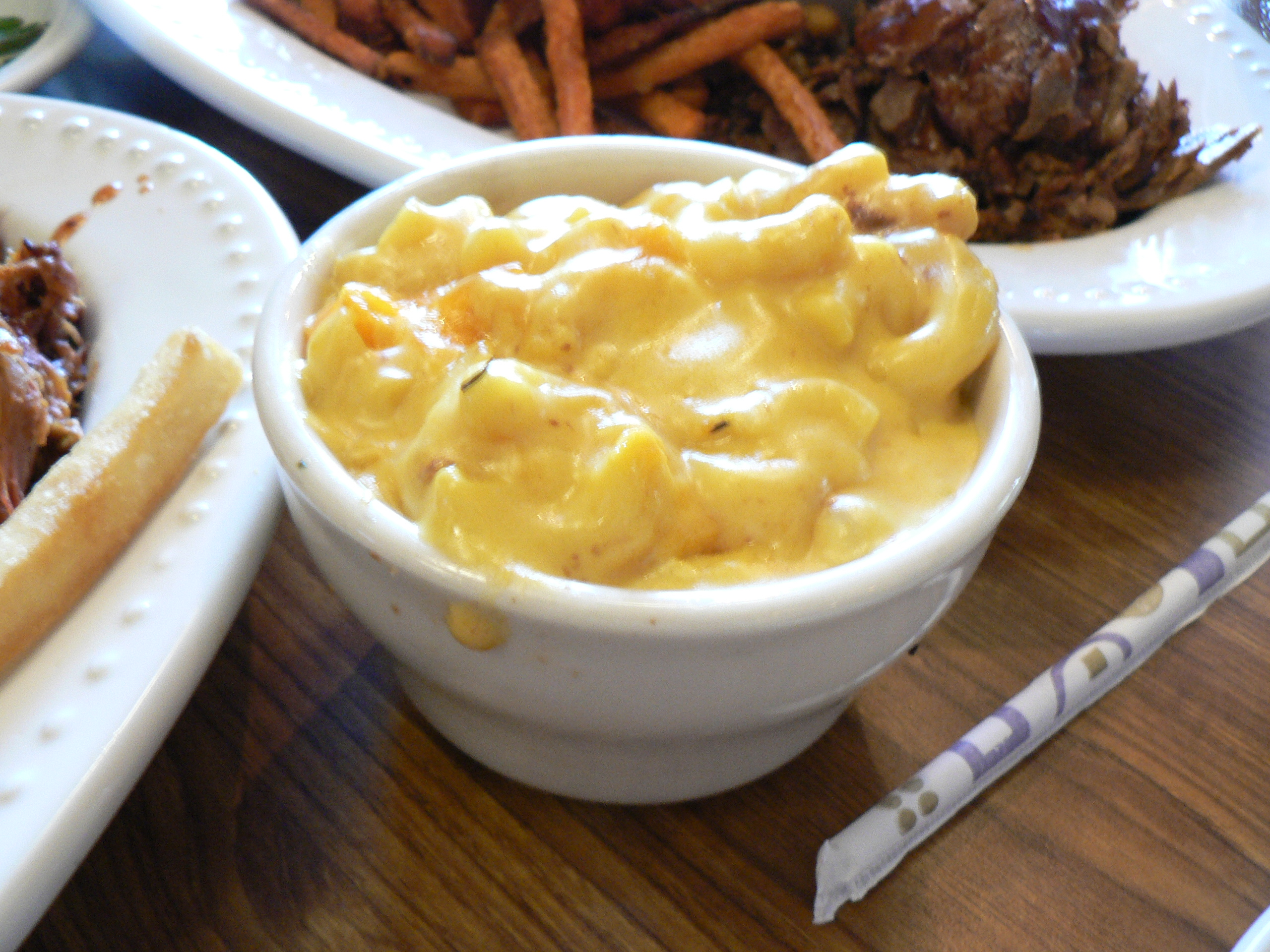
A side dish of macaroni and cheese

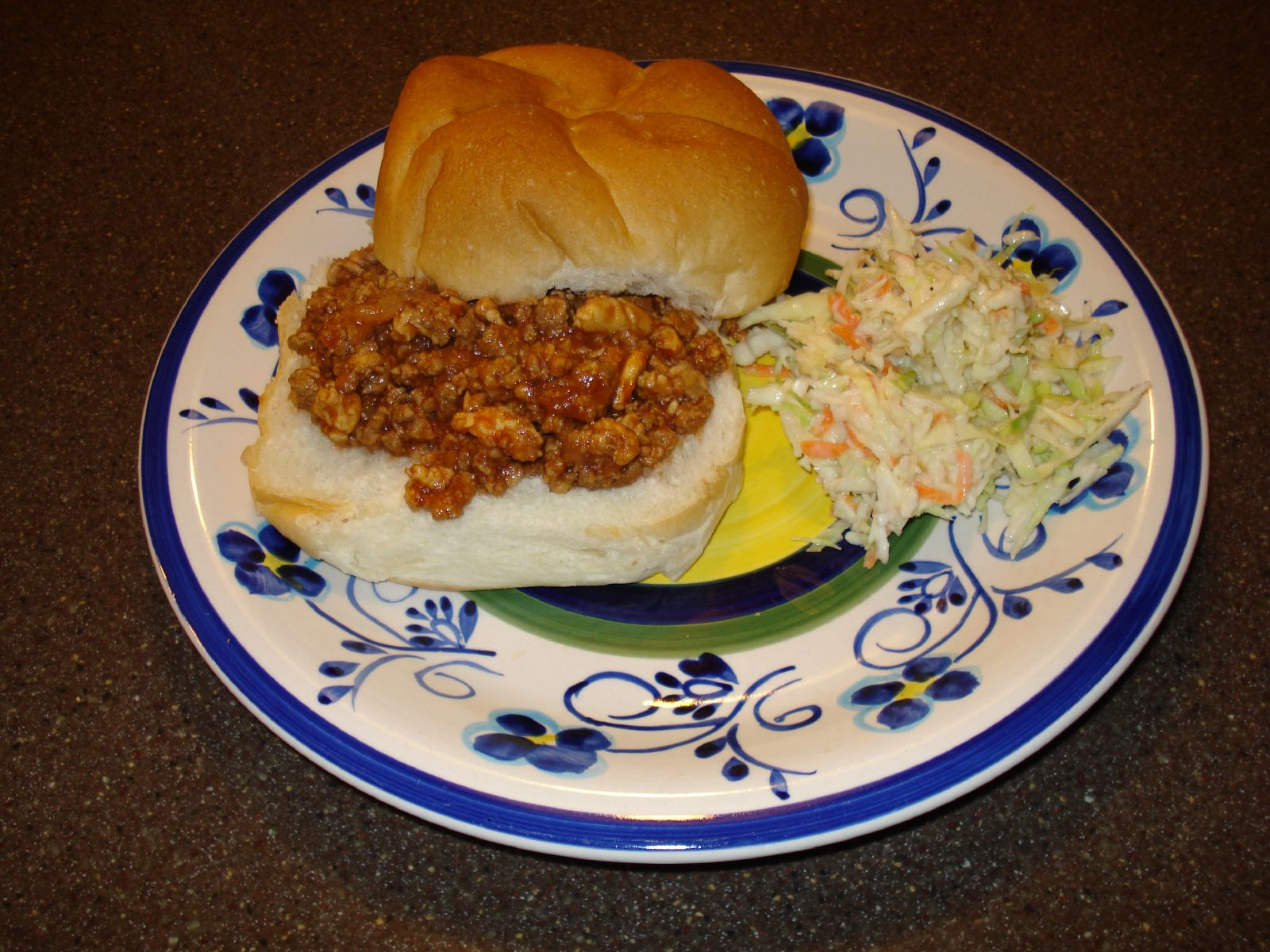
A sloppy joe sandwich with a side dish of coleslaw

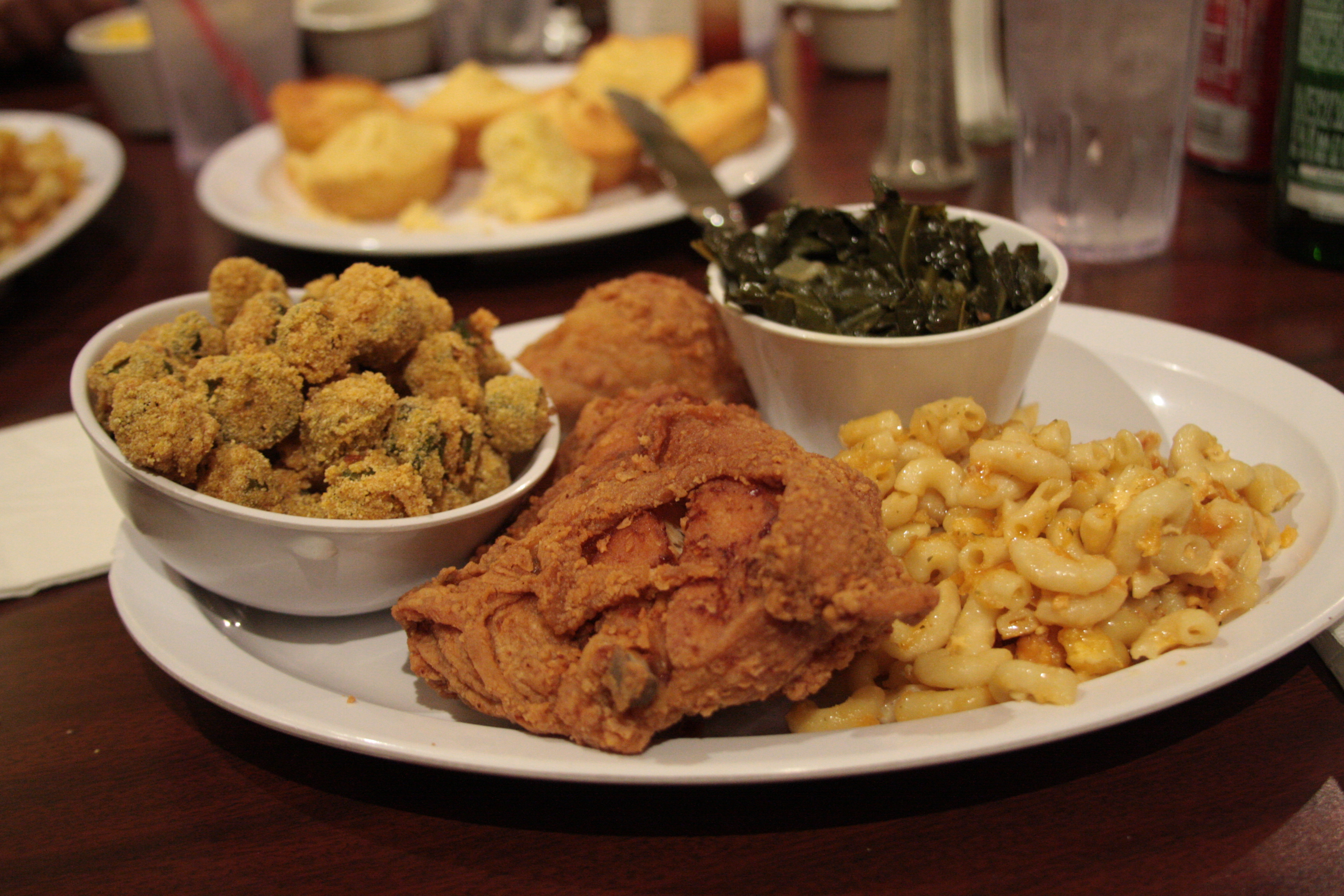
A traditional southern food dinner consisting of fried chicken with macaroni and cheese, collard greens, okra and cornbread

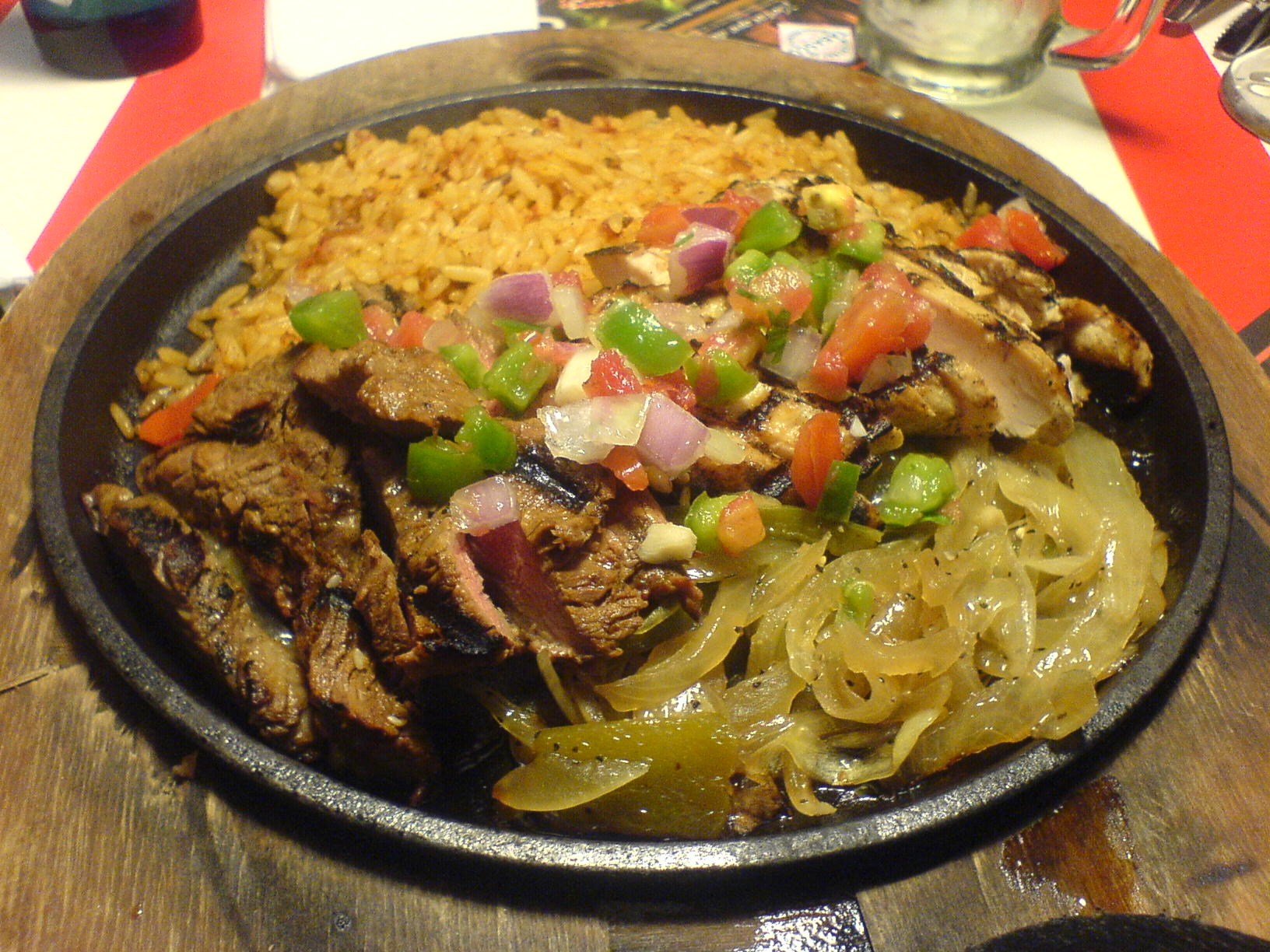
Tex-Mex: mixed beef and chicken fajita ingredients, served on a hot iron skillet

Chicken and waffles

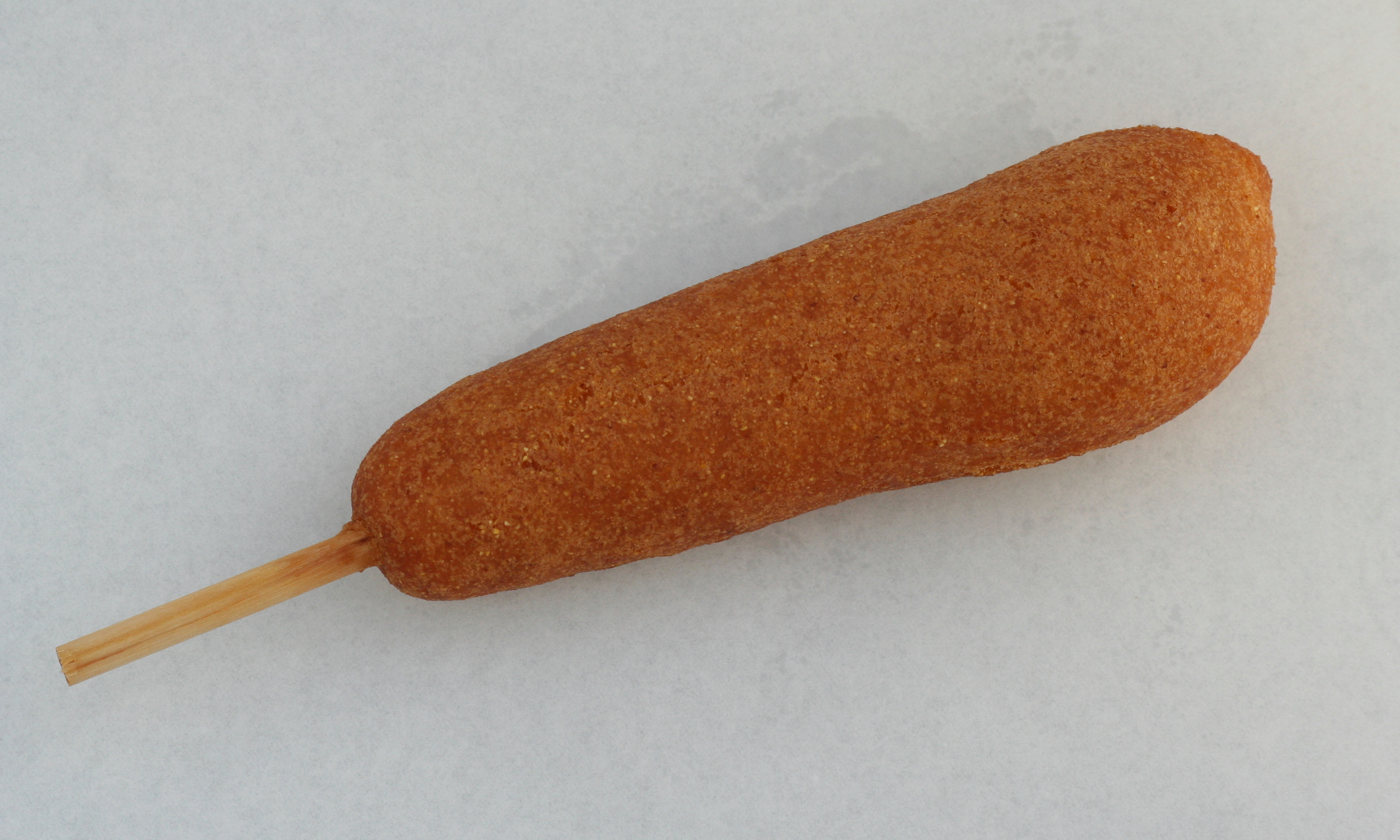
Corn dog

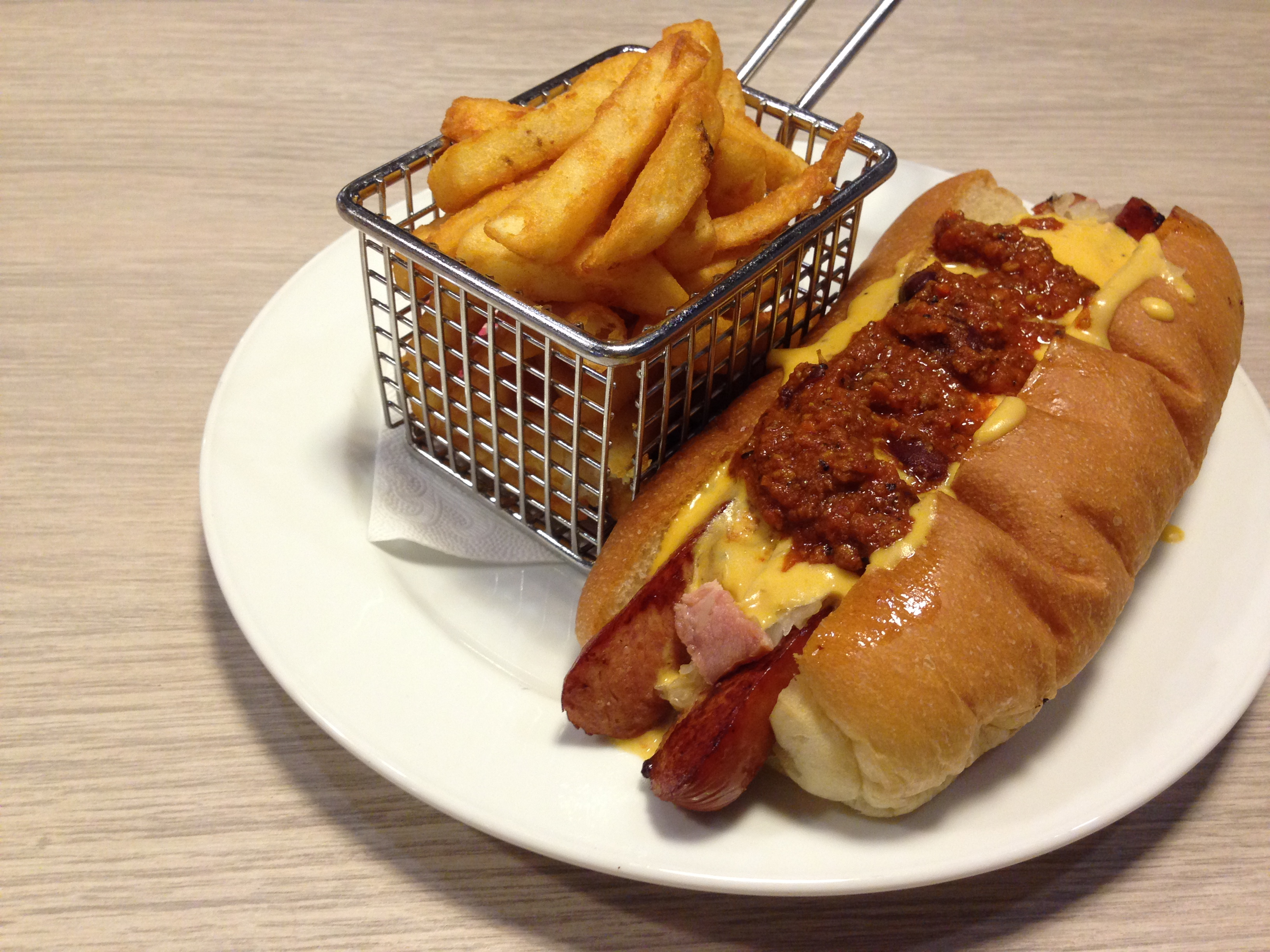
Chili dog

== General items ==
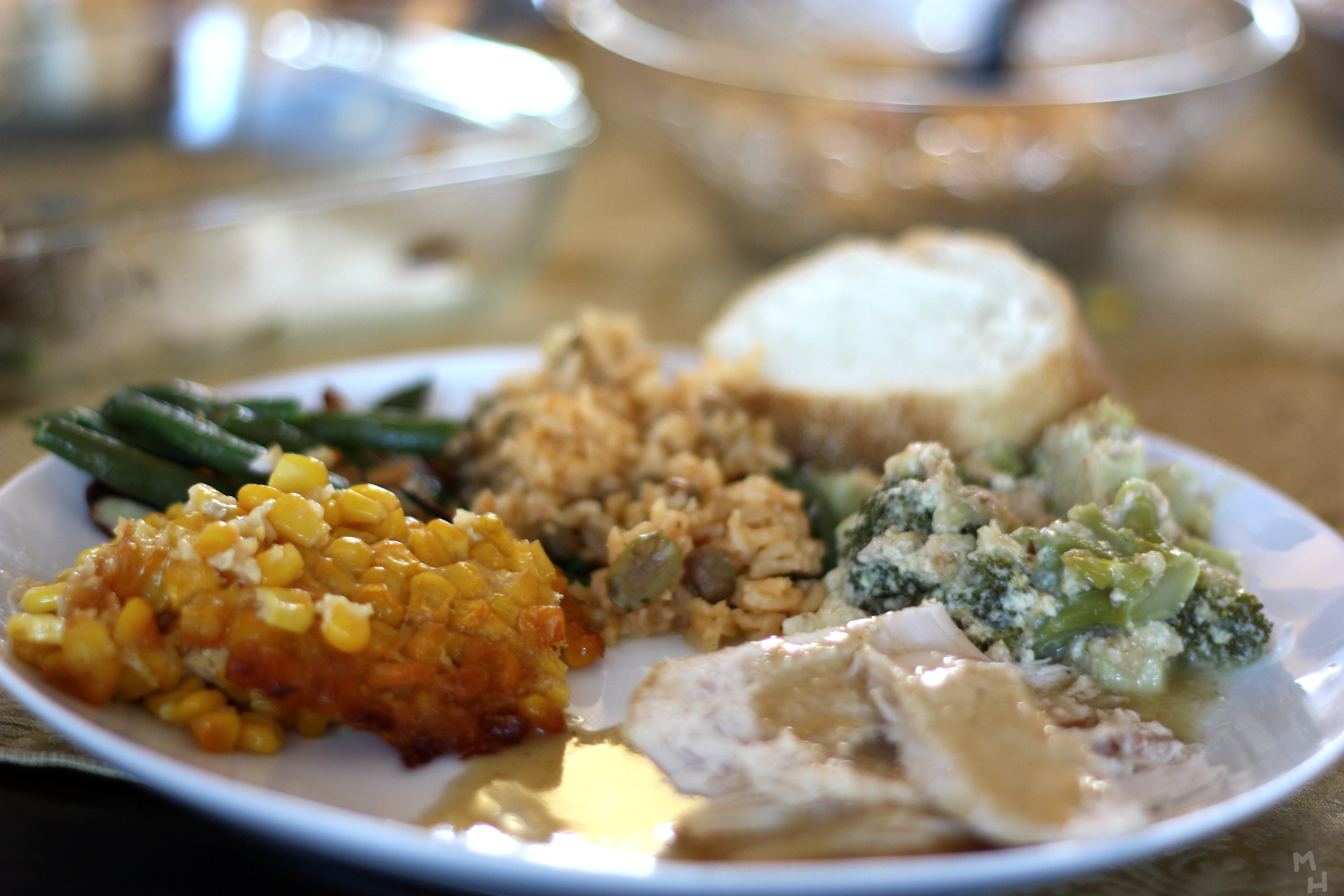
A Thanksgiving dinner

This includes general areas of food interest relating to the United States.

- Barbecue in the United States
  - Barbecue in North Carolina
  - Barbecue in Texas
  - Kansas City–style barbecue
  - Memphis-style barbecue
  - Santa Maria–style barbecue
- Pizza in the United States
  - California-style pizza
  - Chicago-style pizza
  - New York–style pizza
  - Detroit-style pizza
  - St. Louis–style pizza
- History of the hamburger in the United States
- New American cuisine
- Roadkill cuisine
- Native American cuisine
- Tex-Mex
- Thanksgiving dinner

== See also ==
- Indigenous cuisine of the Americas
- Canadian cuisine
- Mexican cuisine
- List of American breakfast foods
- List of American sandwiches
- List of American regional and fusion cuisines
- List of Minnesotan dishes
- List of foods
- List of foods of the Southern United States
- List of regional dishes of the United States
- List of soul foods and dishes
