= Crisp sandwich =

Sandwich containing crisps (potato chips)

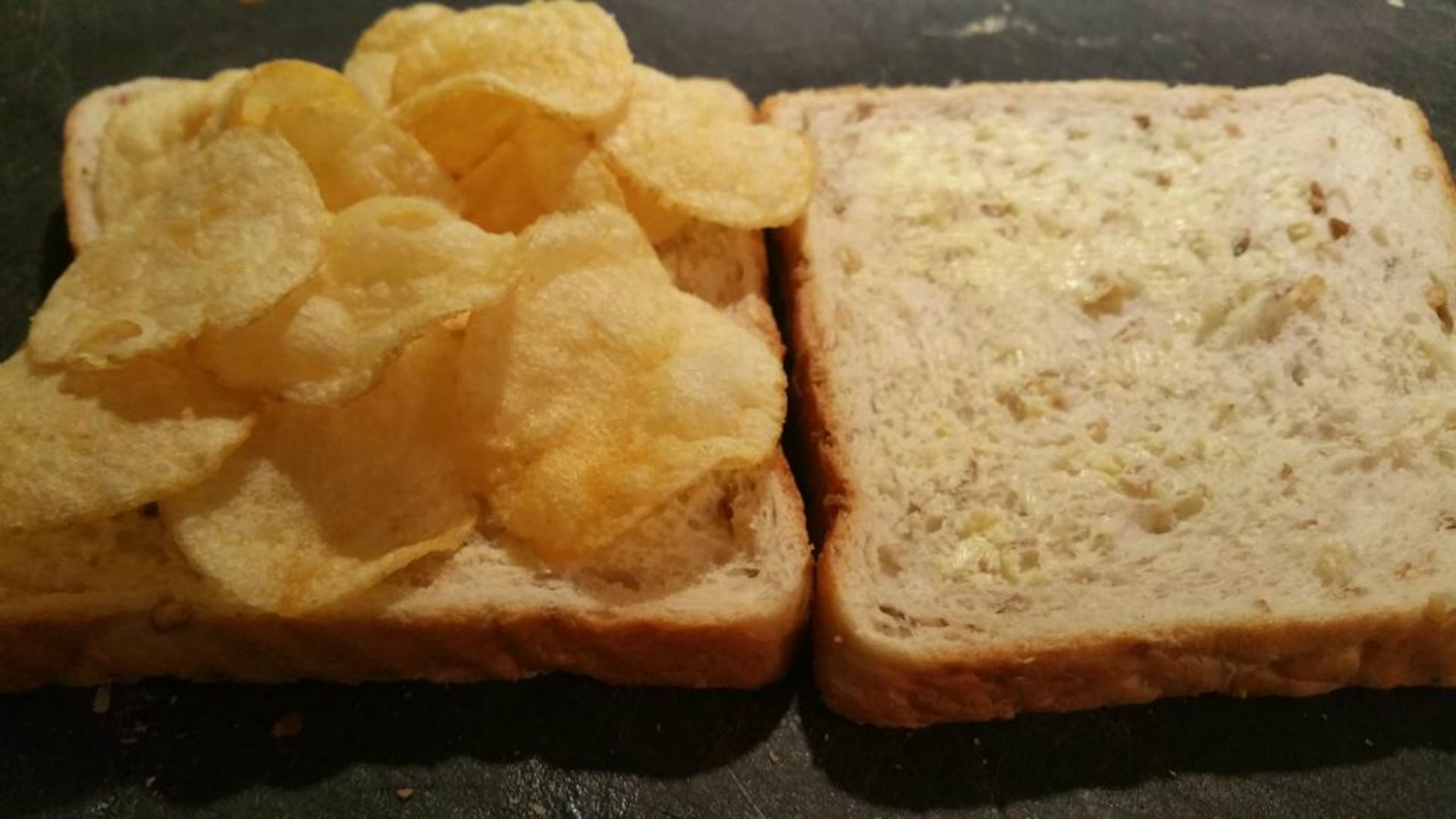
- A crisp sandwich being prepared
- Alternative names: Chip sandwich; chipwich; potato chip sandwich
- Type: Sandwich
- Main ingredients: Bread; butter; crisps

A crisp sandwich (in British English and Hiberno-English) is a sandwich with crisps as the only filling, or combined with other ingredients. In addition to the crisps, any other common sandwich filling (meat, cheese, lettuce, tomato, etc.) may be added.

== Sandwich ==
A crisp sandwich may also be called a crisp sarnie (in British English), piece and crisps (in Scottish English), chippy sandwich (in Australian English), chip sandwich, crispwich, and crisp butty. They are popular in the United Kingdom and Ireland.

In the United Kingdom, two crisp sandwich cafés were opened in 2015: in Belfast and West Yorkshire. Crisp sandwiches can be found in establishments throughout the UK including delis, cafés, and pubs.

In 2021, British company Walkers released a recipe book titled A Little Book of Crisp Sandwich Recipes which "celebrates the British tradition of putting crisps in a sandwich" with a series of recipes by Max Halley, who opened a London deli specialising in crisp sandwiches.

== Regional variations ==
In 2023, British crisp brand Walkers worked with delis throughout the UK to offer crisp sandwiches for a limited period as part of their #crispIN advertising campaign, which later saw the company release a series of sandwich-inspired crisp flavours including 'cheese toastie' and 'sausage sarnie'.

In Ireland and Northern Ireland, crisp sandwiches are also often called Tayto sandwiches in reference to the popular Irish crisp brand and its Northern Irish counterpart. The Irish airline Aer Lingus offered a Tayto sandwich pack as part of their in-flight menu from 2015 to 2016. In 2015, a pop-up shop was opened by Tayto in Dublin to raise funds for charity.

Sandwiches or wraps made using crushed crisps of the Chips Oman brand are part of the popular food culture of the United Arab Emirates.

== See also ==
- Chip butty, a sandwich made with chips
- List of sandwiches
- List of potato dishes
- Primanti Bros.
