= Sloppy joe =

Variety of sandwich made with ground meat

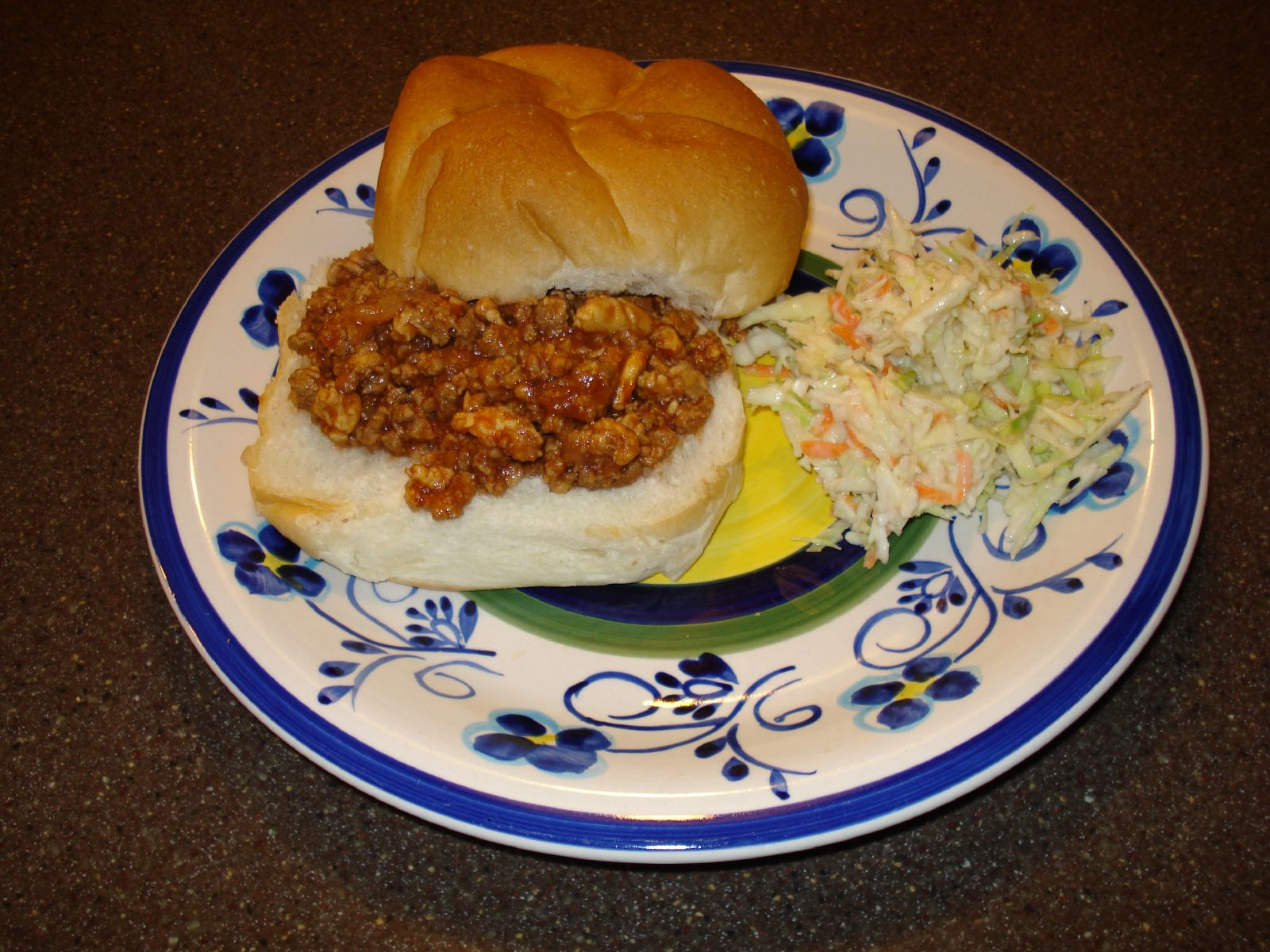
- A homemade sloppy joe with coleslaw
- Type: Sandwich
- Course: Main
- Place of origin: United States or Cuba
- Created by: Possibly José "Sloppy Joe" Abeal y Otero
- Serving temperature: Hot
- Main ingredients: Ground beef, onions, sweetened tomato sauce or ketchup, Worcestershire sauce, seasoning, hamburger bun
- Variations: Multiple
- Food energy (per serving): 634 kcal (2,650 kJ)
Nutritional value
(per serving)
- Protein: 46.3 g
- Fat: 27.1 g
- Carbohydrate: 48 g

A sloppy joe is a sandwich consisting of ground meat (typically beef), onions, tomato sauce or ketchup, Worcestershire sauce, and other seasonings served on a hamburger bun.

== History ==
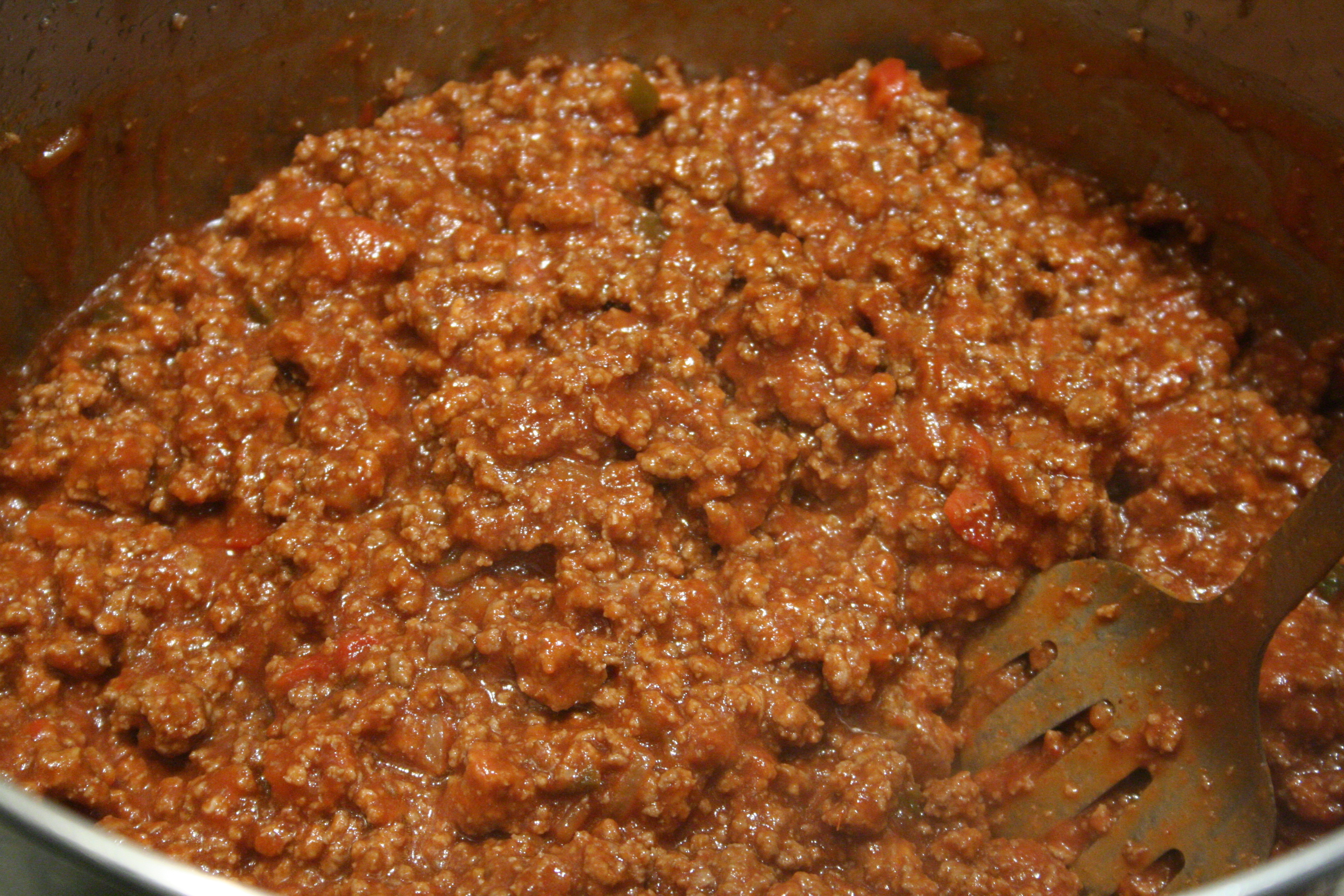
Sloppy joe meat being prepared with Manwich sauce

Early and mid-20th century American cookbooks offer plenty of sloppy joe-type recipes, though they go by different names: Toasted Deviled Hamburgers, Chopped Meat Sandwiches, Spanish Hamburgers, Hamburg a la Creole, Beef Mironton, and Minced Beef Spanish Style.

There are several theories about the sandwich's origin. One theory is that in 1917, José "Sloppy Joe" Abeal y Otero, owner of Sloppy Joe's Bar in Havana, created "a simple sandwich filled with ground beef stewed in tomatoes." This was possibly his interpretation of ropa vieja or picadillo, both traditional dishes of Cuban cuisine. His bar was reportedly frequented by figures such as Errol Flynn, Ernest Hemingway, and Graham Greene. Circa 1937, Hemingway convinced Joe Russell, a bar owner in Key West, Florida, to rename his Silver Slipper bar Sloppy Joe's. Town Hall Deli in New Jersey claims that this same Cuban bar also served a messy sliced ham and turkey sandwich with Russian dressing that Town Hall copied and also named "Sloppy Joe" after the bar, creating much confusion.

Marilyn Brown, director of the consumer test kitchen at H.J. Heinz in Pittsburgh, says their research at the Carnegie Library suggests that the sloppy joe's origins lie with the "loose meat sandwiches" sold in Sioux City, Iowa, in the 1930s and were the creation of a cook named Joe.

References to sloppy joes as sandwiches began in the 1940s. One example from Ohio is a 1944 Coshocton Tribune ad under the heading "'Good Things to Eat' says 'Sloppy Joes' – 10c – Originated in Cuba – You'll ask for more – The Hamburg Shop" and elsewhere on the same page, "Hap is introducing that new sandwich at The Hamburg Shop – Sloppy Joes – 10c".

Food companies began producing packaged sloppy joe, in cans with meat, or just the sauce, such as Manwich, by the 1960s.

A 1975 Dictionary of American Slang defines sloppy joe as any cheap restaurant or lunch counter serving cheap food quickly.

== Variations ==
Several variations of the sloppy joe exist in North America. In Quebec, sandwiches of stewed ground beef such as pain à la viande and pain fourré gumbo are usually served on hot dog buns. A similar sandwich, the "dynamite", exists in the area around Woonsocket, Rhode Island, and is distinguished by the use of onions, bell peppers, and sometimes celery.

In Brazil, a buraco quente sandwich is prepared by replacing a pão francês bread roll's crumb with ground beef stewed in seasoned tomato sauce. In Scotland, a "mince roll" or "roll and mince" is a morning roll filled with minced beef and butter.

=== New Jersey ===
In some stores in northern New Jersey, an unrelated sandwich made with a combination of lunch meats, such as turkey, roast beef, or especially pastrami, with coleslaw, Russian dressing, and Swiss cheese on three slices of rye bread is also known as a sloppy joe.

== See also ==
- Barbecue sandwich
- Chipped beef
- Chili burger
- Chopped cheese
- Horseshoe sandwich
- Keema
- Mitraillette
- Picadillo
- Roti john
- South American (sandwich)
- Tavern sandwich
- List of American foods
- List of American sandwiches
- List of sandwiches
