= Manwich =

Sloppy joe sauce brand

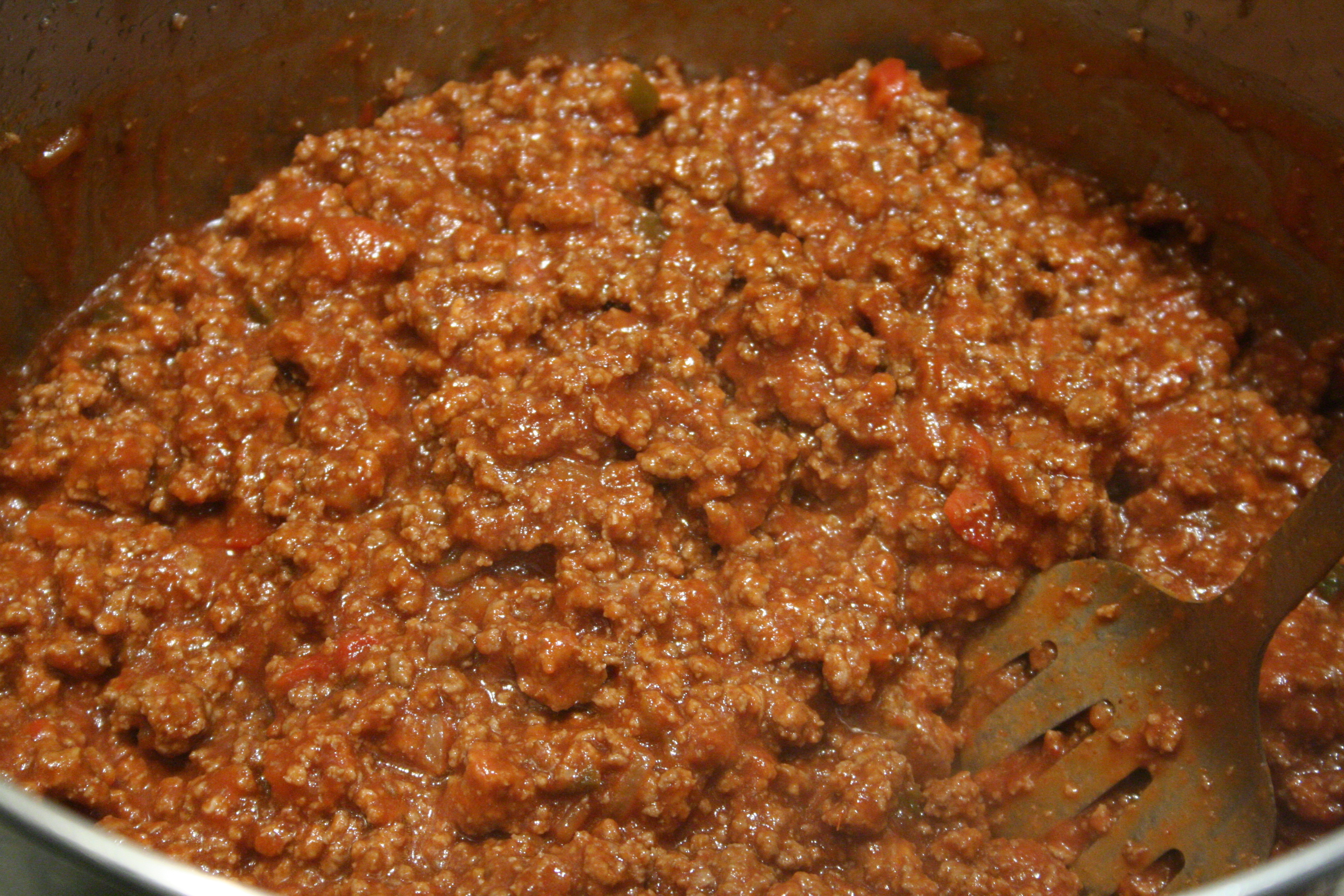
- Sloppy joe meat made with Manwich
- Type: Sauce
- Place of origin: United States
- Created by: ConAgra Foods, Inc. and Hunt's
- Invented: 1969; 57 years ago

Manwich, a portmanteau of man and sandwich, is the brand name of a canned sloppy joe sauce produced by ConAgra Foods and Hunt's, introduced in 1969. The can contains seasoned tomato sauce that is added to ground beef cooked in a skillet. It is marketed as a quick and easy one-pan meal for families. Manwich's slogan is, "A sandwich is a sandwich, but a Manwich is a meal."

Manwich Heat & Serve was introduced in 2004. It contains both the seasoned tomato sauce and ground beef in a microwavable bowl.

There are currently at least three different flavors of Manwich: Original, Bold, and Thick & Chunky.
