= Gatsby (sandwich) =

South African sandwich

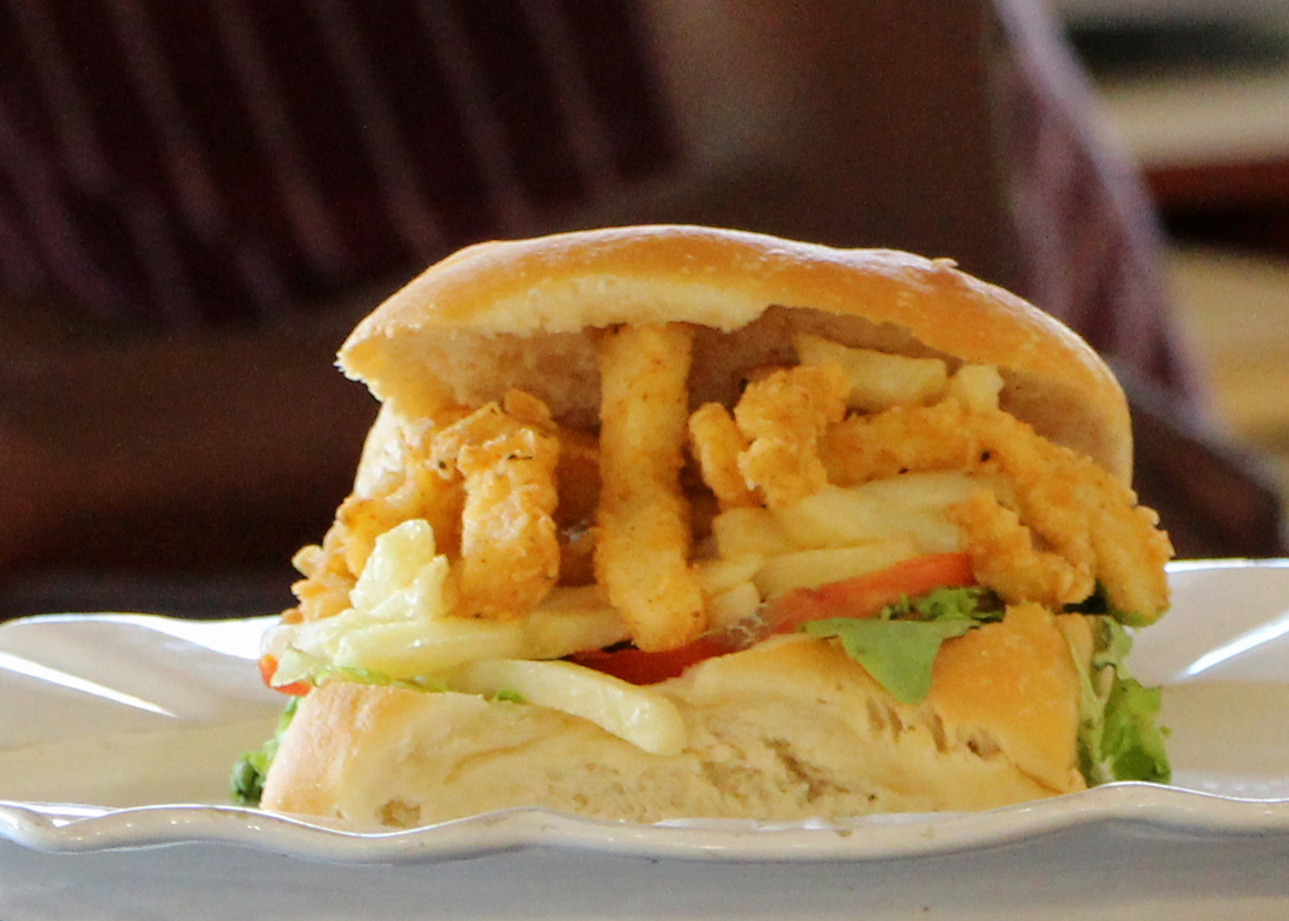
- A close-up view of a personal-sized Gatsby sandwich prepared with calamari and chips
- Type: Sandwich
- Place of origin: South Africa
- Region or state: Cape Town
- Main ingredients: Bread rolls, French fries, meat or seafood (masala steak, chicken, polony, Vienna sausage, calamari, fish), sauce

A Gatsby is a South African submarine sandwich consisting of a bread roll filled with chips (French fries) and a choice of fillings and sauces. It originated in Cape Town and is popular throughout the Western Cape province. The sandwich is typically large and shared by several people.

== Recipe ==
There is no standard recipe for a Gatsby, but it is usually offered in a long (one foot or more) French-style bread roll cut crosswise. Other breads used may include hot dog buns or roti flat breads, although a filled roti is usually referred to as a salomie. The sandwich is made large to be shared, usually four ways. The filling of a Gatsby comprises chips with any number of other ingredients such as meats, fish and eggs. Meat fillings may include chargrilled steak, masala steak, chicken, polony sausage, Vienna sausage, bacon and kielbasa. Fried or pickled fish, calamari, curry and eggs are also frequently offered. The fillings are commonly dressed with achar pickles or peri peri sauce.

Although the Gatsby is typically made with meat fillings, vegan versions can be found that are usually made by substituting the meat with marinated soy. Healthier versions can also be found, using ingredients such as beans which are said to significantly reduce cholesterol and fat levels.

== History ==
The Gatsby sandwich originated in 1976 in Athlone, in the Cape Flats area of Cape Town. Food shop owner Rashaad Pandy wanted to serve a quick but filling meal to workers helping him renovate his store. He filled a large round loaf with "slap chips" (South-African-style chips with vinegar), polony sausage and achaar and cut this into wedges. "Froggy", one of the workers, declared the sandwich a "Gatsby smash", alluding to the movie The Great Gatsby which had been screened at an Athlone cinema. The name stuck and Pandy subsequently offered the sandwich in his shop. The sandwich grew in popularity and was adjusted to use a long French-style roll. The gatsby sandwich is a popular hangover cure for Capetonians.

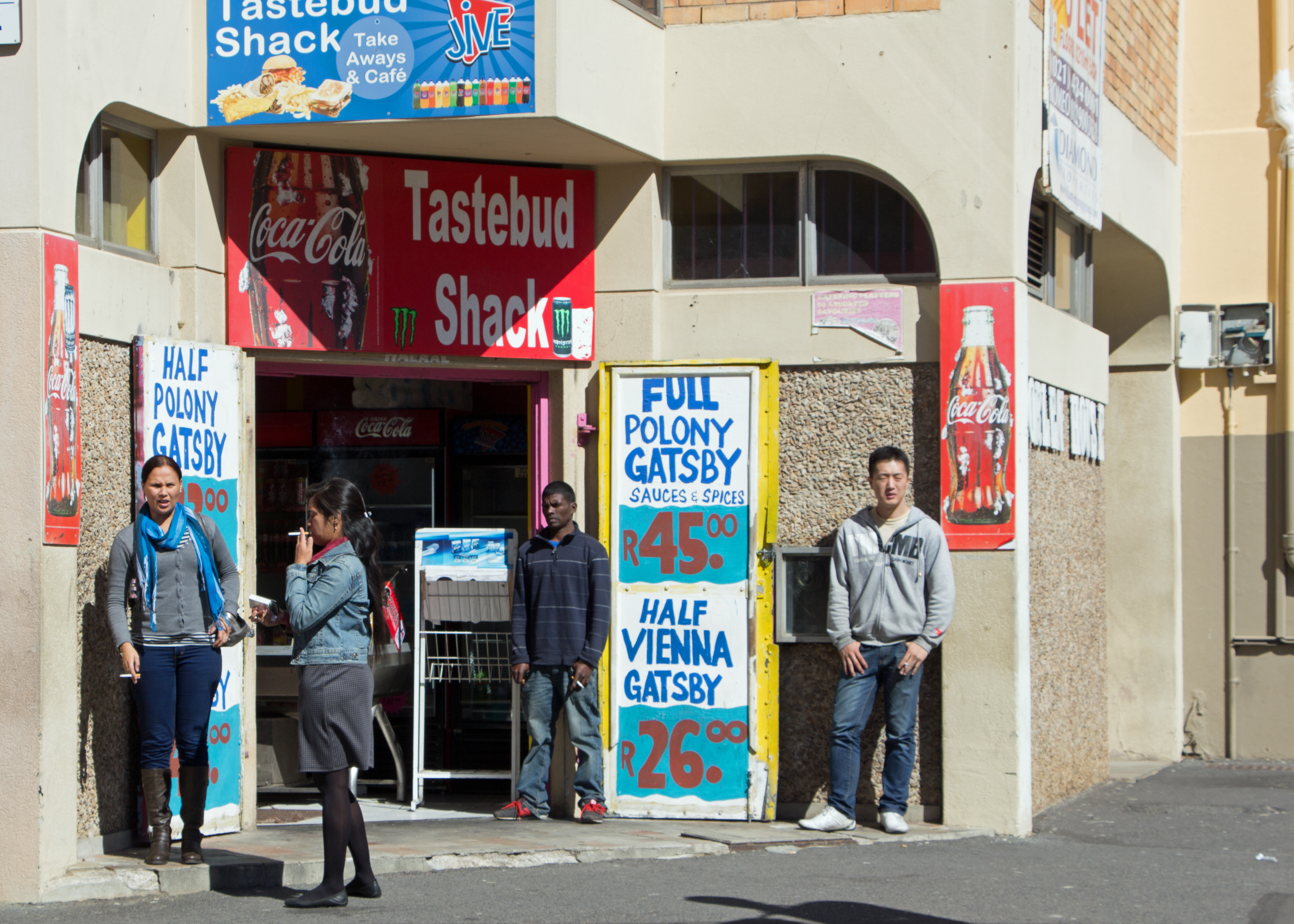
A store in Cape Town, South Africa with signage for Gatsby sandwiches, 2014

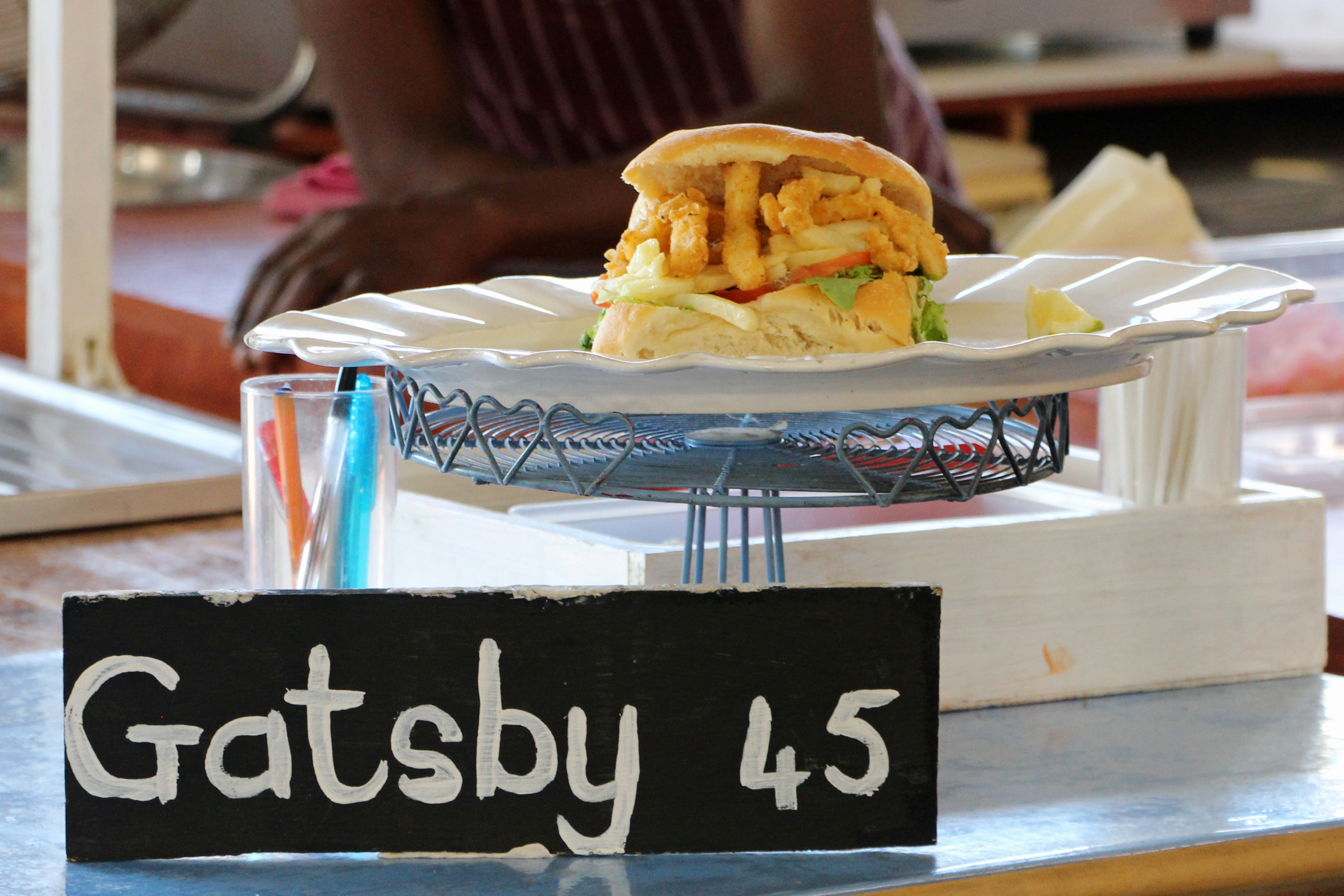
A personal-sized Gatsby sandwich prepared with calamari and chips, being sold at a food stall for R45 (approximately USD 3.75), 2014

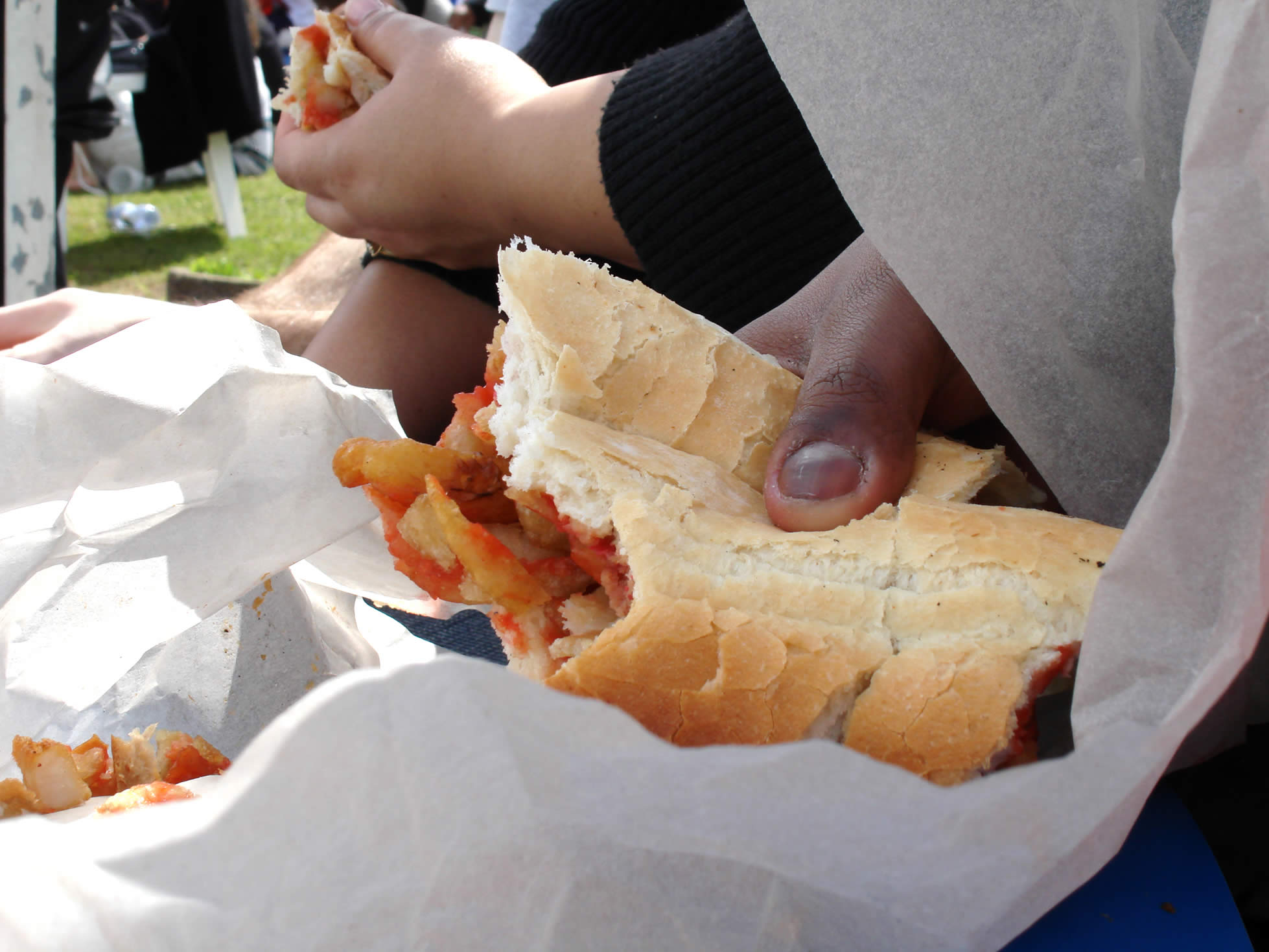
A Gatsby sandwich

== See also ==
- Bunny chow—a South African fast-food dish consisting of a hollowed-out loaf of bread filled with curry
- Chip butty—a French-fry sandwich from the United Kingdom
- Mitraillette—a French-fry sandwich from Belgium
- List of African dishes
- List of sandwiches
