= Mitraillette =

Belgian sandwich

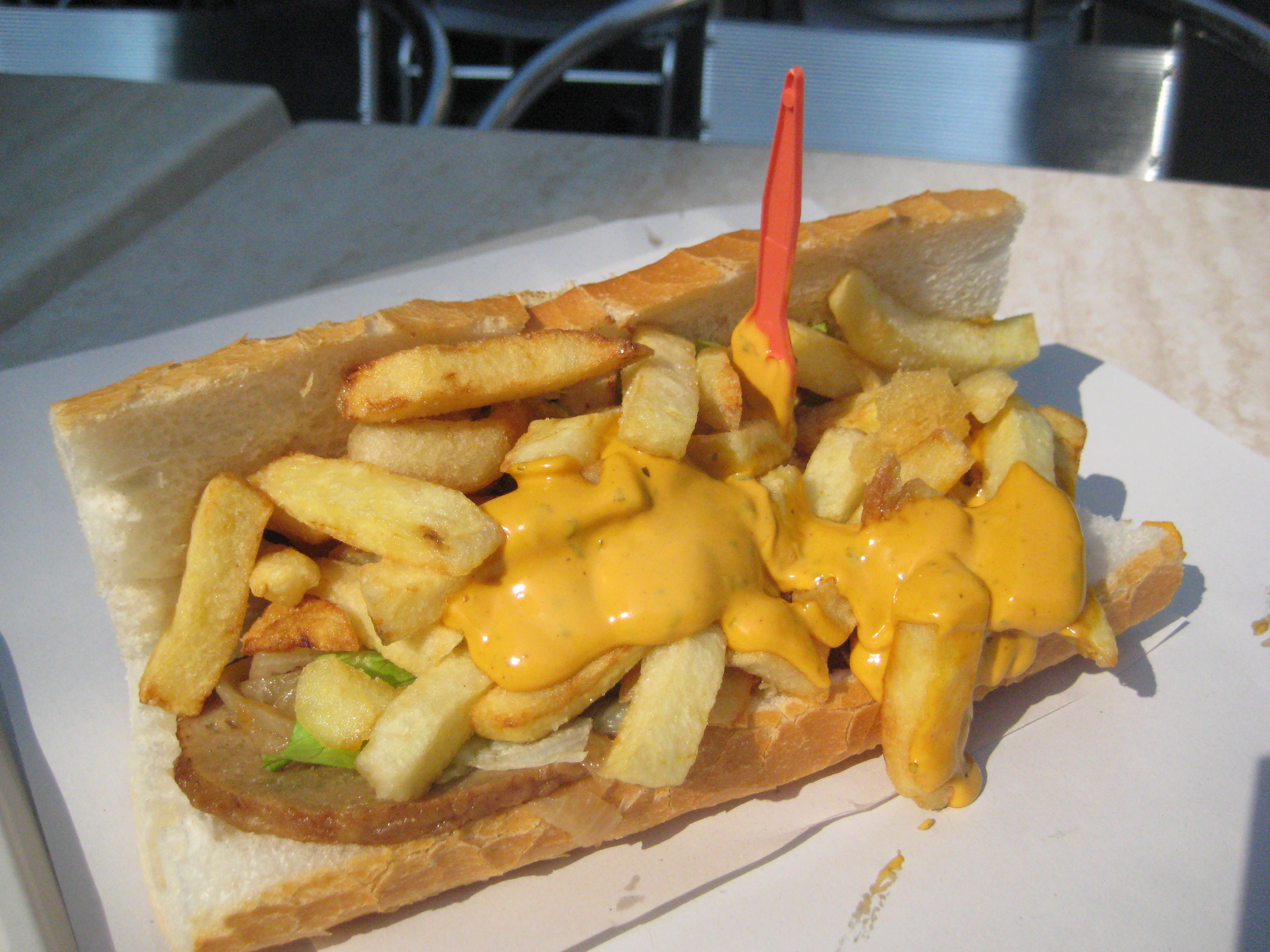
- A mitraillette
- Alternative names: Américain
- Type: Sandwich
- Course: fast food
- Place of origin: Belgium
- Region or state: Brussels
- Serving temperature: hot (filling) room temperature/ warmed (baguette)
- Main ingredients: Bread, meat, fries, various sauces

A mitraillette (French pronunciation: [mitʁajɛt], lit. 'submachine gun'; Walloon: mitrayète) is a type of sandwich in Belgium commonly served at friteries and cafés. It is popular among students.

It is thought to have originated in Brussels, but is also popular in Flanders, Wallonia, and the Nord region of France, where it is also known as an "Américain" (literally an "American").

== Composition ==
A typical mitraillette consists of:

- Half a baguette (or sometimes a smaller version of a baguette).
- Fries.
- Fried meat (such as sausage, burger, or steak). The type of meat available varies with the friterie.
- Sauce, such as mayonnaise, ketchup, sauce andalouse, garlic sauce, or bearnaise sauce.

Crudités may be included (grated carrot, fresh lettuce, tomato slices), as well as cheese and cabbage.

Originally mitraillettes contained only a sausage or sliced meat. Alternatives quickly became available.

== In popular culture ==
After the Brussels bombings in March 2016, images of the sandwich were shared across social media in Belgium and abroad as a sign of friendship and humour.

In December 2020, former Top Chef (France) contestant Jean-Philippe Watteyne opened a pop-up mitraillette restaurant in Mons.

In November 2021, DH Les Sports + reported that a friterie in Etterbeek sells Belgium's longest mitraillette, measuring 130 centimetres (51 in).

In 2025, BetUS.com reported extended queues for a AUS$27 (€16.32) steak mitraillette at the Australian Open.

== See also ==
- List of sandwiches
- Chip butty, the English equivalent
- Gatsby (sandwich), a South African equivalent to the mitraillette
- French tacos, a French fast-food item containing similar ingredients wrapped in a flour tortilla
- Horseshoe sandwich, a ground beef and fries sandwich from the U.S. state of Illinois
- Chopped cheese, sloppy joe, and roti john, select examples of ground beef sandwiches
