= Roti john =

Fried baguette sandwich with egg and filling

Roti John
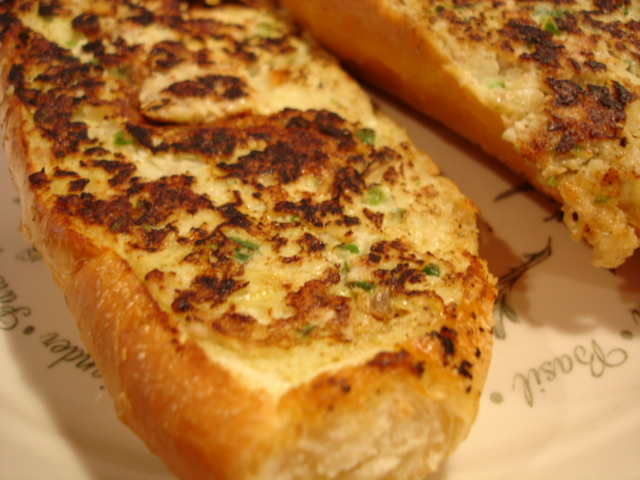
- Course: Main course or snack
- Place of origin: Singapore
- Region or state: Singapore, Malaysia, Brunei, Indonesia
- Serving temperature: warm
- Main ingredients: bread, egg, onions, meat or fish

Roti John (lit. 'John bread') is an omelette sandwich that is a popular street food dish in Southeast Asia. It originated in Singapore in the 1960s and consists of a bread loaf, similar to a French baguette, halved and cooked on a griddle with beaten egg and onions combined with a protein such as minced lamb, sardines or chicken.

== Origin ==
Roti comes from an Indian term for a round flatbread, used more generically to describe a bread sandwich of any shape. The origin of "John" within the name of the dish has not been definitively proven, but may derive from British use of John as a generic male first name, especially used to address someone whose first name is unknown, difficult to remember or difficult to pronounce, thus a name that may have been used by British Armed Forces personnel to address native vendors in British Malaya or vice versa. Oral sources have claimed that the dish and name originated with a Malay cook who lived in Singapore during the early 1970s. In 1976 a stall in the Taman Serasi hawker centre began serving the dish, after obtaining the recipe from another hawker. The stall's popularity led its version to became widely associated with the dish. It moved to Serangoon Garden Market in 2001.

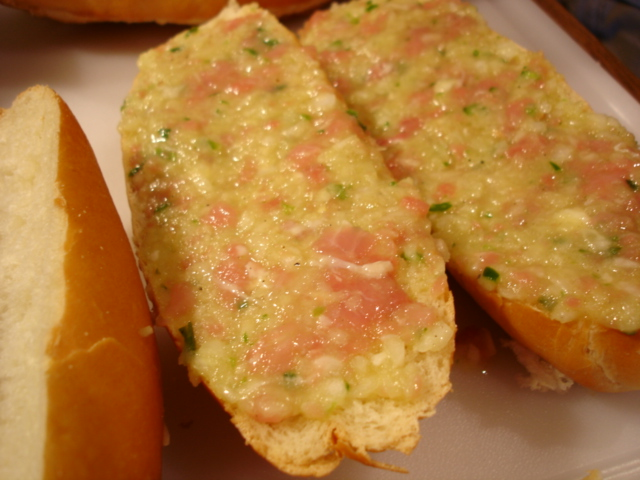
Roti john prior to frying.

== See also ==
- Malay cuisine
- List of sandwiches
- Chopped cheese
- Denver sandwich
- Egg in a basket
- Mitraillette
- Sloppy joe
- St. Paul sandwich
