= Barbecue sandwich =

Sandwich with barbecued meat fillings

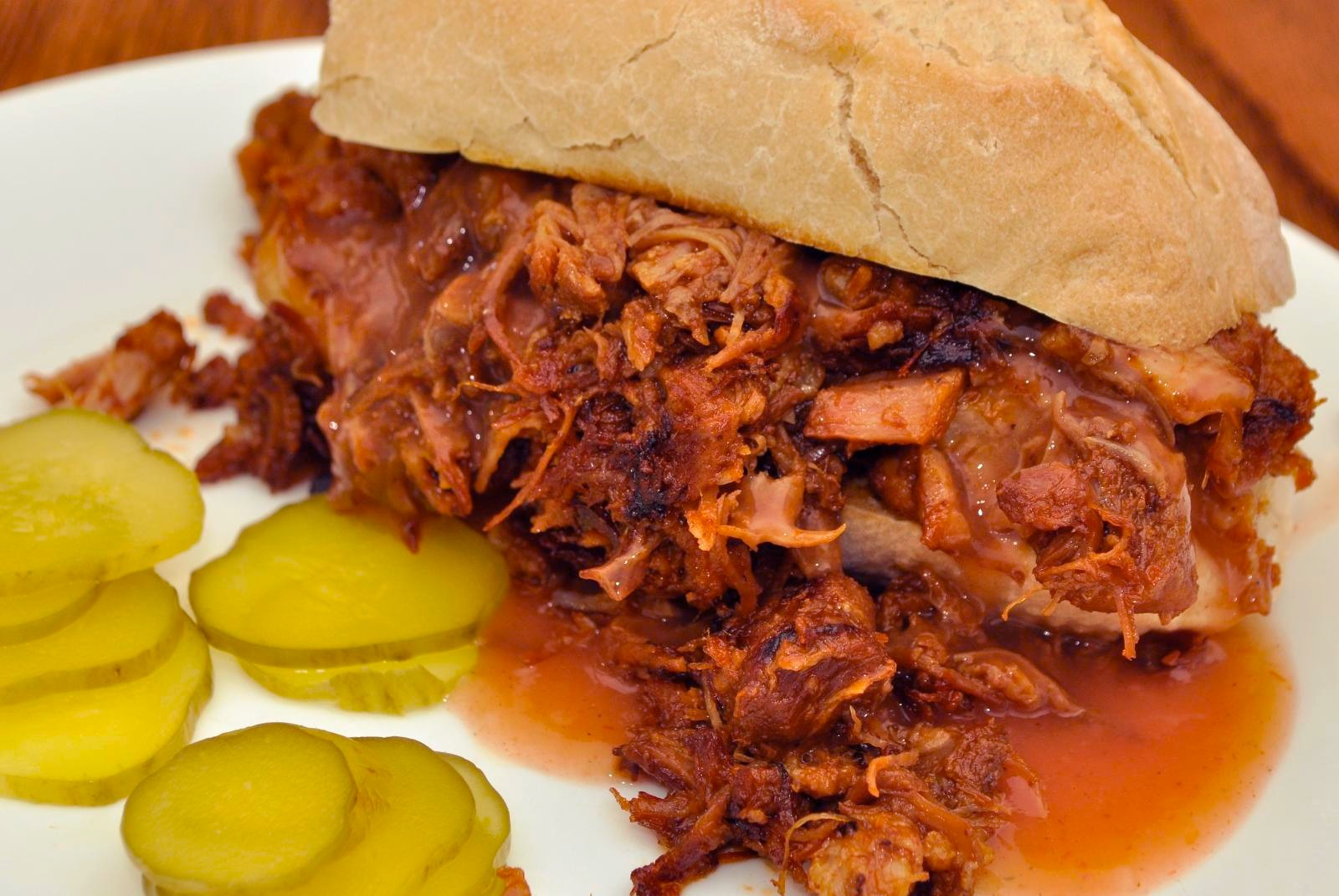
A barbecue sandwich served with pickled cucumber

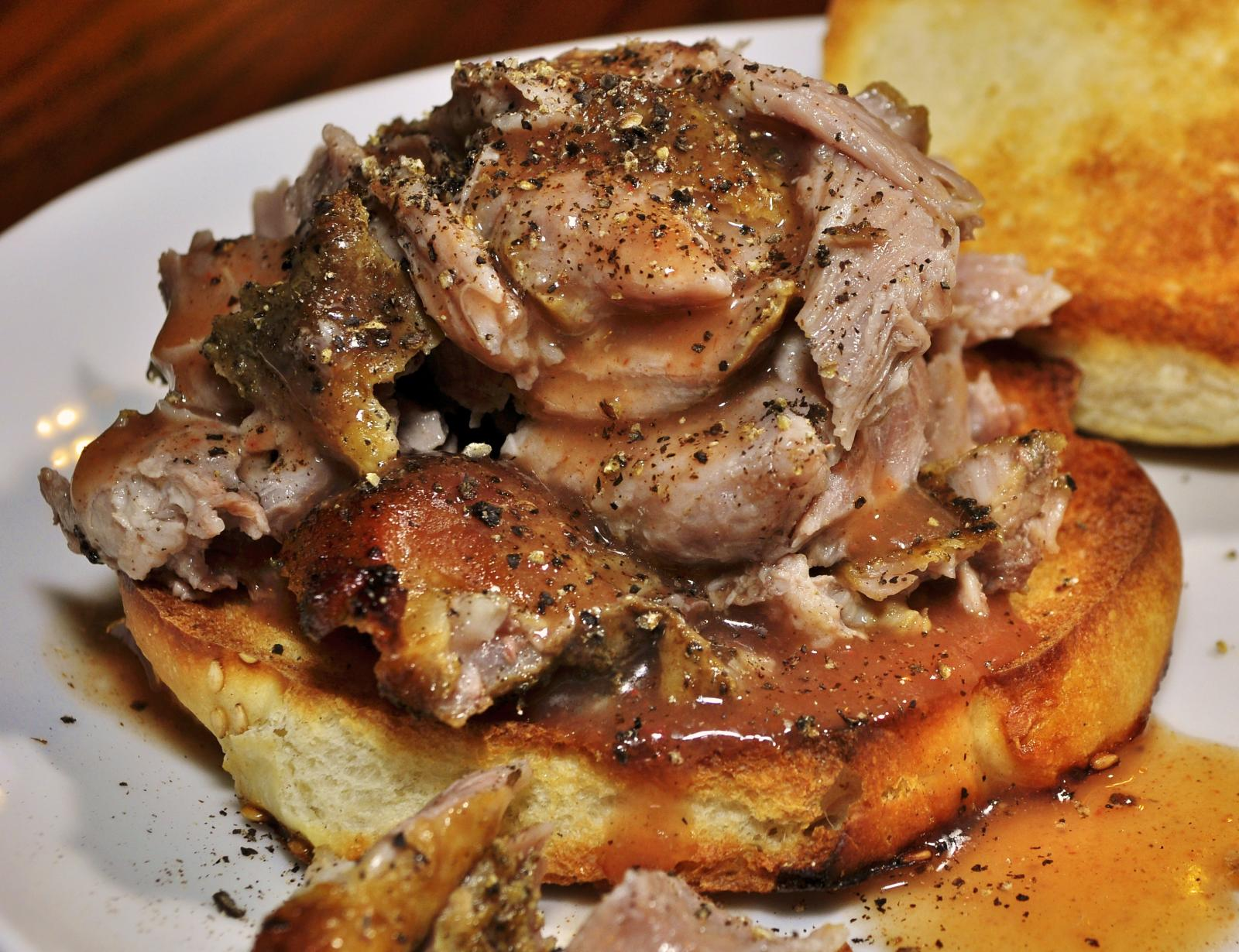
A pulled pork barbecue sandwich

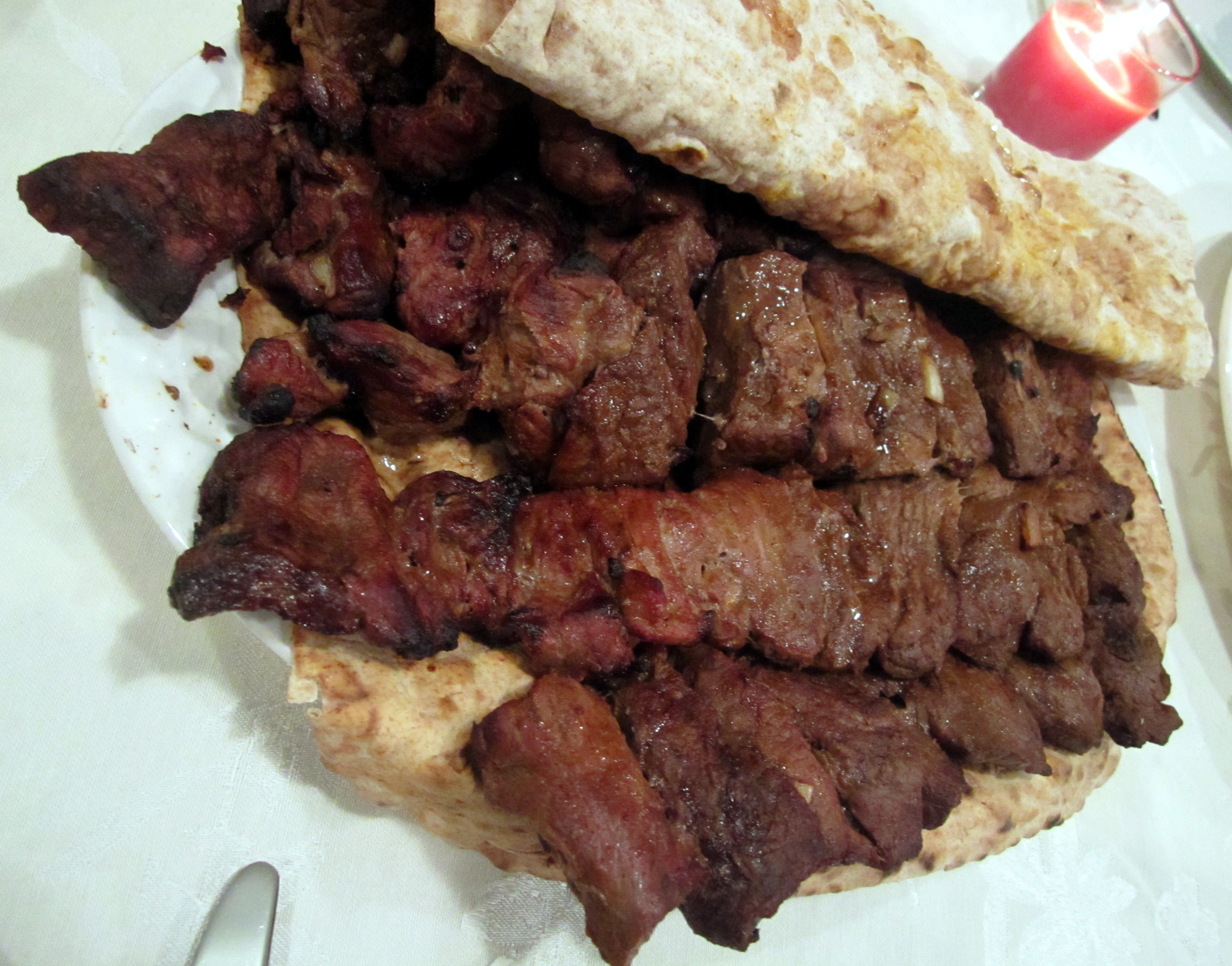
Barbecued meat served in flatbread

A barbecue sandwich is a sandwich that is commonly prepared with barbecued meats and typically served on a bun or Texas toast. Several types of meats are used to prepare barbecue sandwiches. Some varieties use cooked meats that are not barbecued, but include barbecue sauce. Many variations, including regional variations, exist, along with diverse types of cooking styles, preparations and ingredients.

== Types ==
Barbecue sandwiches use many different meats and preparation styles. Meats may be sliced, chopped or pulled, and various types are used, such as pork, pulled pork, pork shoulder, beef, beef brisket, chicken, sausage, pork ribs and turkey. Some versions use slow-smoked meats. Barbecue sandwiches typically have barbecue sauce included in their preparation, either when the meat is cooked, as a sauce within a sandwich, or both. Some meats may be seasoned with a spice rub. Some barbecue sandwiches may use cooked meats that are not barbecued but include a barbecue sauce. Coleslaw is sometimes served with barbecue sandwiches, either on the sandwich itself or as a side dish. Sometimes sautéed vegetables such as onion and garlic are also used. Some versions prepared with beef brisket include both lean and fatty portions from the cut of beef to enhance their flavor. Pre-packaged barbecue sandwiches are also manufactured.

Breads used in the preparation of barbecue sandwiches typically include white bread, buns, whole wheat bread, or Texas toast. The bread can help to prevent the meat from drying and to retain its temperature.

== Regional variations ==
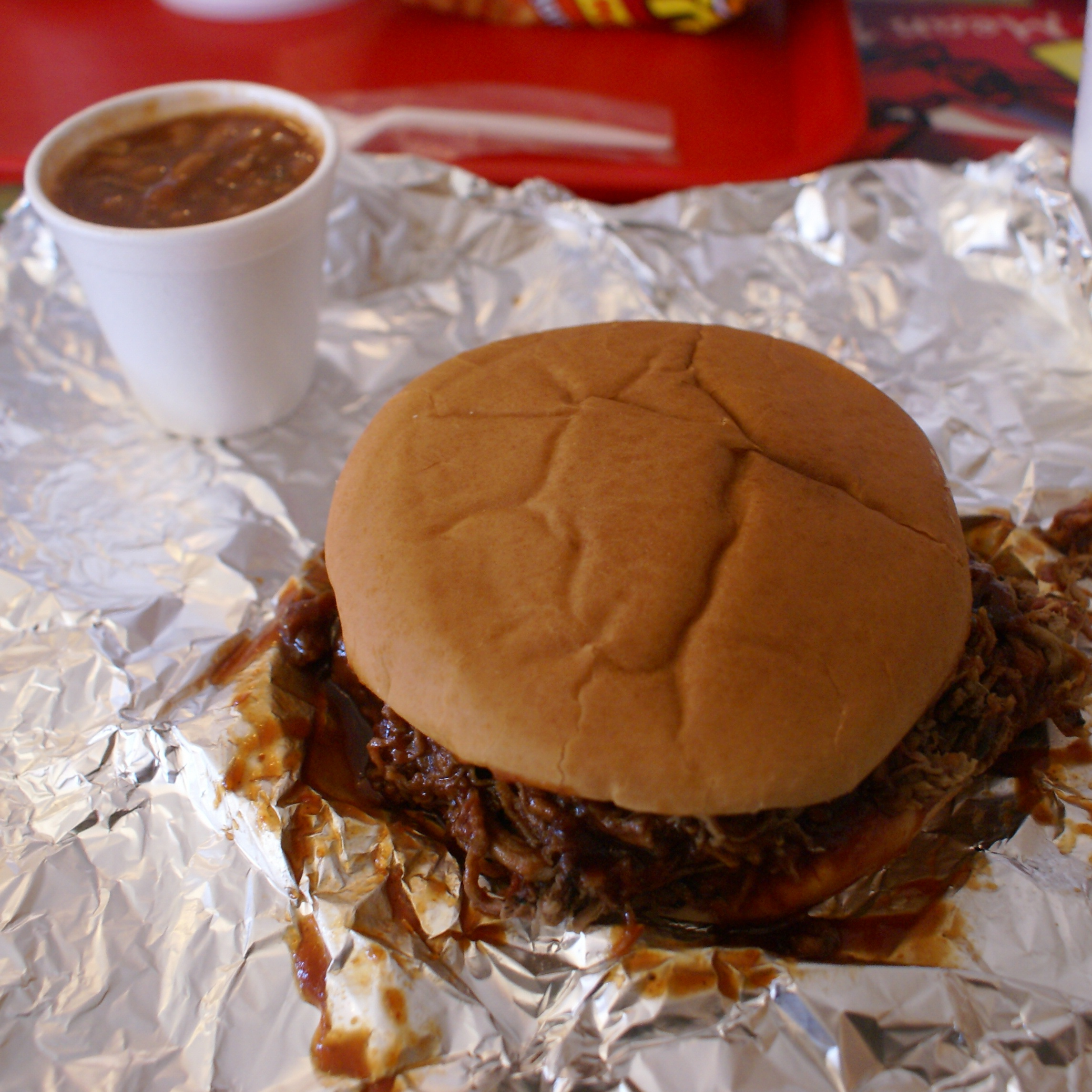
A barbecue sandwich, served with a side of smoked beans

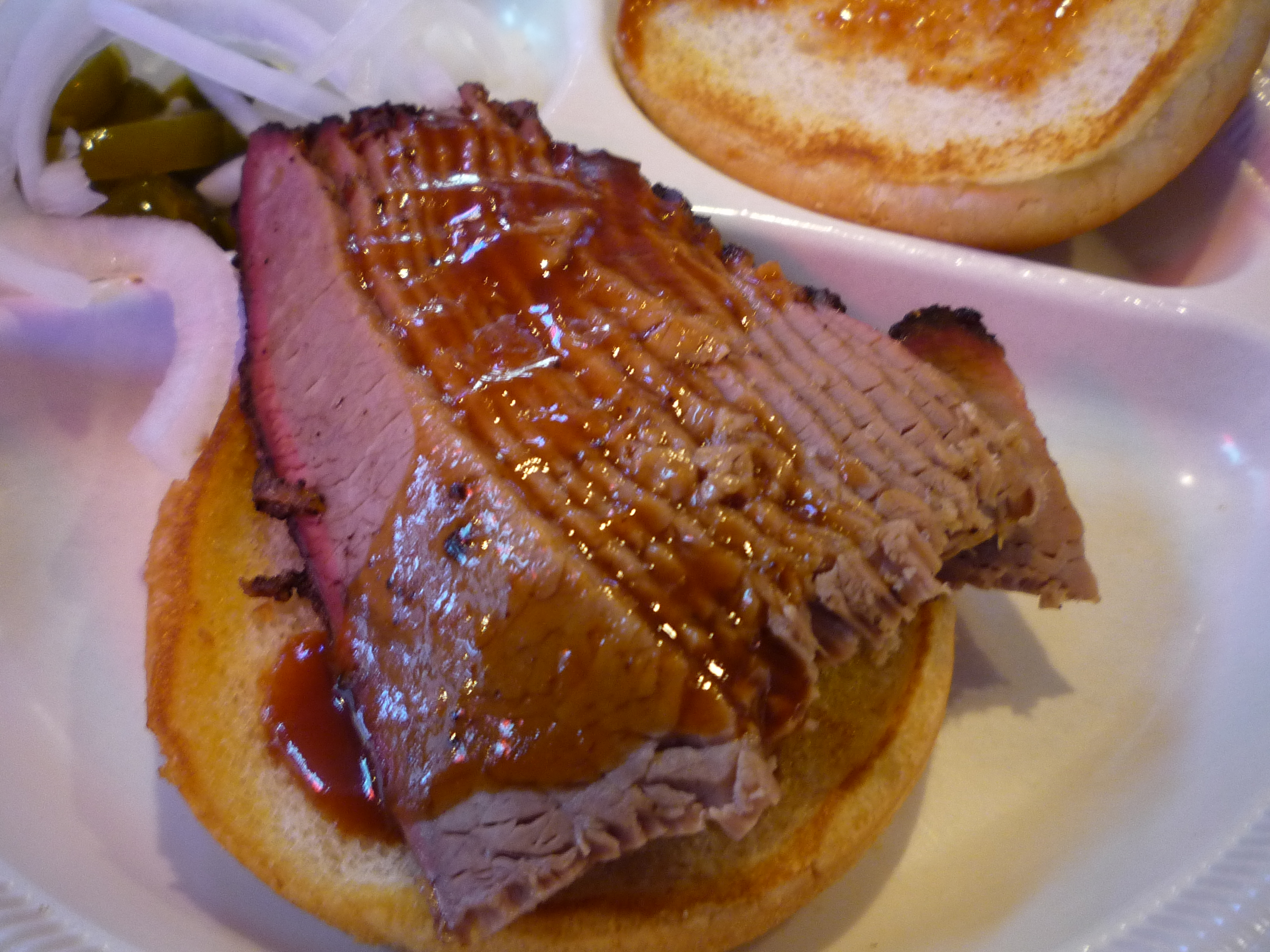
A beef brisket barbecue sandwich

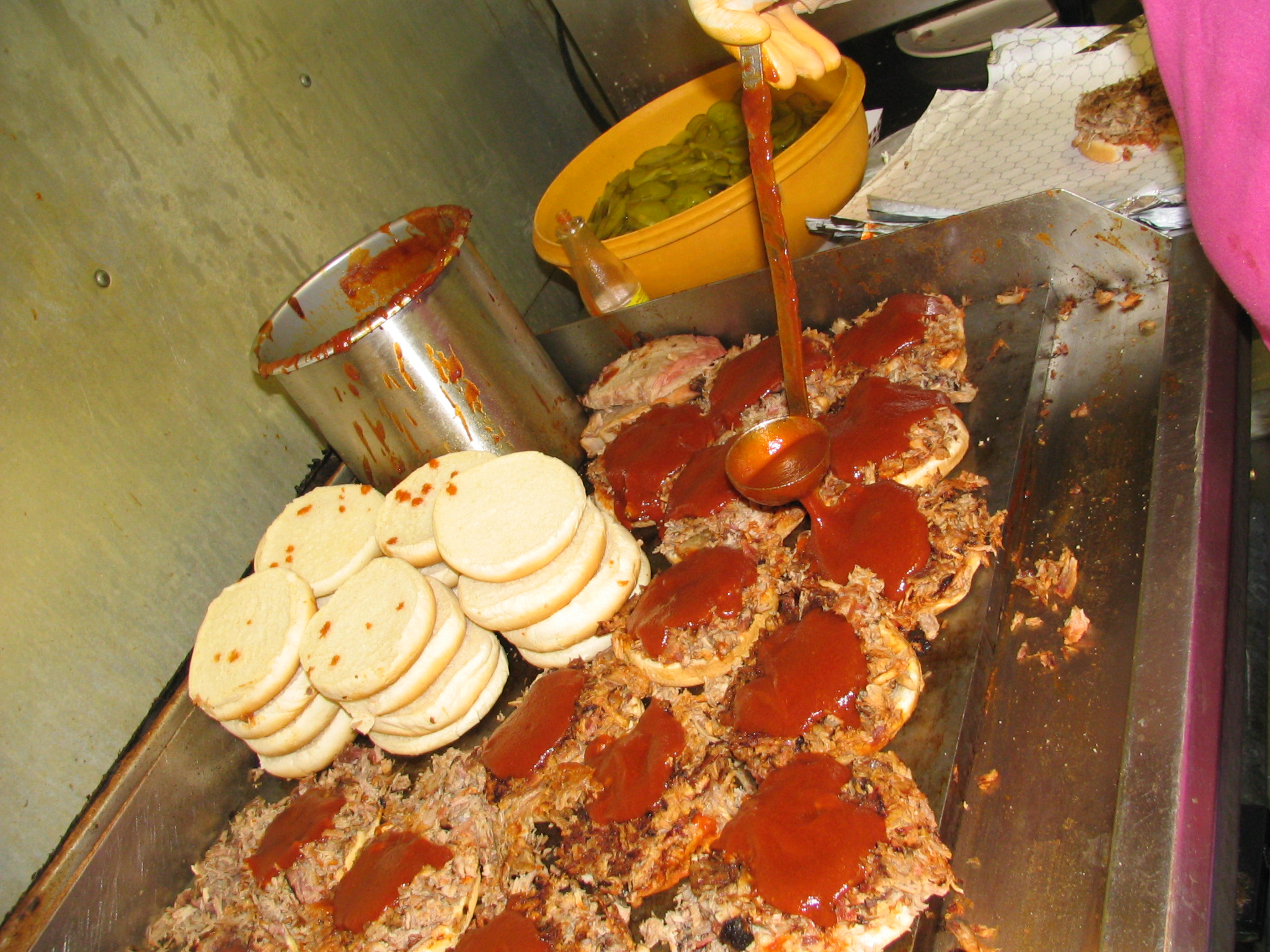
Barbecue sandwiches getting sauced at a barbecue restaurant in Alabama

=== East Asia ===
In East Asian cuisine, the northern Chinese rou jia mo and southern gua bao are common foods. These sandwiches contain BBQ chicken or marinated beef and roast pork.

==== Korea ====
In Korean cuisine, there are two main fusion styles for barbecue sandwiches. Commonly known styles of sandwiches are Korean Bulgogi and Cheesesteak Sandwich, which both feature thinly sliced Bulgogi marinated grilled beef typically joined by steamed vegetables and cheese Hoagie roll.

=== Southeast Asia ===
==== Philippines ====
An example of a barbecue sandwich in the Philippines is Pan de sal. This soft, slightly sweet bread roll is commonly used for sandwich-style menu items and more. A popular sandwich is the grilled Pan de Sal Steak and Cheese Sandwich. The steak, often a flank or ribeye steak, is marinated in soy sauce, honey and lemon juice for two hours.

==== Singapore ====
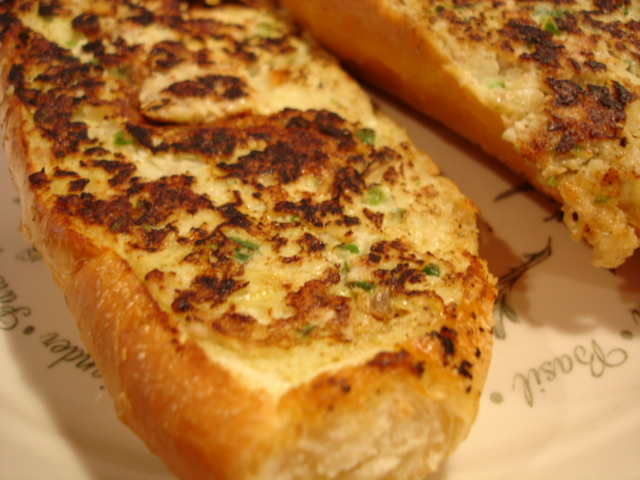
Roti John, in Singapore

A well-known Singaporean street food, roti john is a baguette or soft roll sliced in half, and stuffed with minced meat, usually chicken or beef. Topped off with an onion and egg mixture that is grilled to create crispy edges. This dish is generally served with chili or mayo-like sauces.

Kaya Toast with Grilled Meat. Kaya toast is a breakfast sandwich that offers both sweet and savory flavors. This dish features toasted bread with Kaya and butter. Some variations include grilled meats such as ham or pork floss.

==== Vietnam ====
The bánh mì, a popular sandwich in Vietnamese cuisine, features barbecue-style meats. In the western world, this would not be considered a typical barbecue sandwich because of French influence; many versions of bánh mì include roasted or grilled chicken or beef that is marinated in a sweet fish sauce, with sugar and garlic. The sandwiches are served in a baguette with pickled carrots, cucumber, and chili sauce.

=== United States ===
==== Pennsylvania ====
In northeastern & south central Pennsylvania (especially Pennsylvania Dutch country), a barbecue sandwich (or hamburger barbecue sandwich) generally refers to ground beef cooked in barbecue sauce and served on a hamburger bun, known in other parts of the country as a Sloppy Joe.

==== Missouri ====
In Kansas City, Missouri, a grilled pork steak or sliced beef, slathered with Missouri-style sweet and tangy tomato-based sauce, are among the most traditional barbecue sandwich bouquets. The meat was usually cooked over direct heat and served on a sandwich bun with little to no extras. The sauce is characterized by its balance of sweetness, vinegar, and mild spice. This sandwich is in keeping with Missouri’s barbecue tradition of big flavor, big portions, and a heavy emphasis on sauced grilled meats.

==== North Carolina ====
Chopped pork barbecue sandwiches with coleslaw served on the sandwich are most common in North Carolina. The term "barbecue" in North Carolina refers specifically to barbecued, chopped pork that is slow-cooked or smoked whereas other barbecued foods are often referred to by their actual food name.

==== South Carolina ====
South Carolina is well-known for their mustard barbecue sauce, known as "Carolina Gold." Their barbecue sandwiches use pulled pork that has been slow-cooked over wood coals and a yellow sauce. Coleslaw is a common topping, complementing the meat and sauce. Styles vary across the state, with some areas having tomato or pepper and vinegar sauces. The mustard sauce selection sets South Carolina apart, giving them a distinctive attribute.

==== Tennessee ====
Chopped pork shoulder barbecue sandwiches served with coleslaw atop them are common in Memphis, Tennessee. For example, Leonard Heuberger, who in 1922 founded a barbecue restaurant in Memphis named Leonard's, has been reputed there as being the inventor of the "classic Memphis pork barbecue sandwich". This sandwich was prepared on a bun with chopped or pulled pork shoulder meat, a tomato-based sauce, and coleslaw. In the book Southern Food: At Home, on the Road, in History, it is stated that other restaurants "followed suit" regarding this sandwich style, and that "...the standard has not changed in more than 60 years." At the Memphis restaurant chain Tops, pork shoulder sandwiches are described in this book as a "mainstay" that have existed as such since 1952, when the first Tops restaurant opened.

==== Texas ====
When it comes to the Texas barbecue sandwich, it's all about the meat. Sliced brisket reigns with chopped beef and smoked sausage being the most prevalent meats. They use dry-rubbed, smoked, and sliced meats piled high on a bun utilizing a variety of barbecue sauces. Also, the meat should be the star of the show. If sauce is offered, it'll be a tomato-based variety that is either spicy or smoky. Common garnishes include pickles, raw onions, and jalapeños, served on a thick bun or Texas toast.

==== Alabama ====
The Alabama-style barbecue sandwich is smoked or grilled chicken and is dressed with Alabama white sauce, the tangy, mayonnaise barbecue sauce made with vinegar, pepper, and horseradish. This style was born in and around Decatur, Alabama, during the 1920s and is related to Big Bob Gibson’s barbecue restaurant. On a soft bun, it may be topped with pickles or slaw, but what makes it unique is the signature white sauce. That sets it apart from other Southern barbecue sandwiches, which tend more to a mustard sauce along with beef or pork.

== See also ==
- Cha siu bao – a Cantonese barbecue-pork-filled bun
- List of sandwiches
- Polish Boy – Prepared on a bun with kielbasa and layers of french fries, barbecue or hot sauce and coleslaw
- Regional variations of barbecue
- Sloppy Joe – A type of barbecue sandwich

== Bibliography ==
- Garlough, Robert; Campbell, Angus (2011). Modern Garde Manger: A Global Perspective. Cengage Learning. ISBN 111130761X
- Lampe, Ray (2007). Dr. BBQ's Big-Time Barbecue Road Trip!. Macmillan. ISBN 0312349580
- Levine, Ed (2011) Serious Eats: A Comprehensive Guide to Making and Eating Delicious Food Wherever You Are. Random House Digital, Inc. 030772087X
- Smith Griffin Jr. (April 1973). "The World's Best Barbecue is in Taylor, Texas. Or is it Lockhart?". Texas Monthly. ISSN 0148-7736.
