= Chopped cheese =

Sandwich originating from New York City

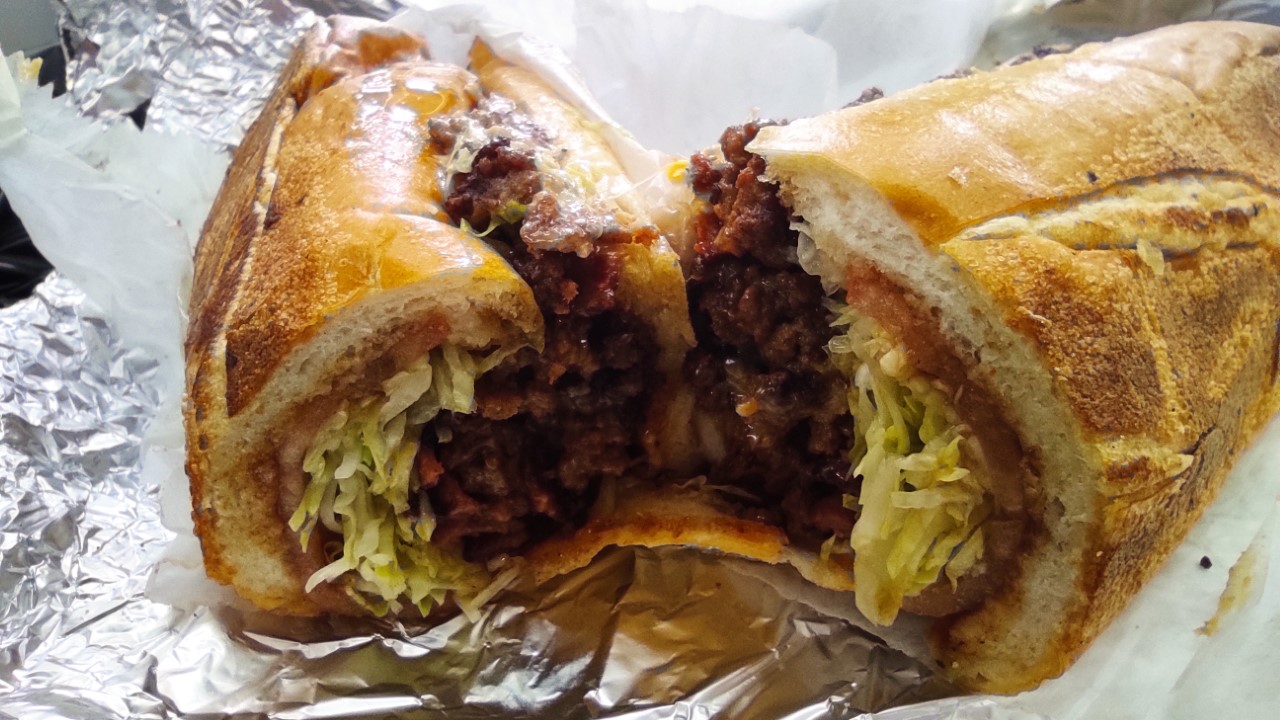
- A local variant of the chopped cheese, in Crotona Park, the Bronx, pictured with halal turkey bacon and barbecue sauce
- Alternative names: Chop cheese
- Type: Sandwich
- Course: Main course
- Place of origin: United States
- Region or state: New York City
- Created by: Various claims
- Serving temperature: Hot
- Main ingredients: Ground beef, cheese, bread

The chopped cheese, also known as the chop cheese, is a type of sandwich originating from New York City. Found in bodegas throughout primarily uptown Manhattan and the Bronx, it is made on a grill with ground beef (typically pre-formed ground beef patties), onions, adobo or other seasonings, and cheese, all of which are chopped together on the grill as the meat and onions cook and the cheese melts. It is served with lettuce, tomatoes, and condiments on a hero roll.

== Origin ==
The actual origins of the sandwich are up for debate, although generally most agree it was first created in a Spanish Harlem bodega called Hajji's Deli, also known as Blue Sky Deli. There is speculation that the sandwich was an adaptation of an Arab specialty, duqqa yamneeya (دقة يمنية, lit. 'pounded Yemeni'), which is essentially cooked chopped meat and vegetables served with Yemeni bread. Hajji's Deli claims a former worker invented the sandwich for himself sometime in the 1990s, after which the concept spread to other bodegas.

The sandwich gained significant media attention in the 2010s, starting with a 2014 episode of Parts Unknown in which Anthony Bourdain, a lifelong New Yorker, told a group of students in the Bronx that he'd never heard of a chopped cheese sandwich. In 2016 a reporter for Insider described the sandwich as "something most New Yorkers had never heard of", despite it being well-known in multiple parts of the city. Those who grew up eating the sandwich at their local bodegas made accusations the sandwich was being "Columbused"—that is, "discovered" by the majority culture; in this case, lower Manhattanites. Multiple upscale restaurants and groceries began serving the sandwich, sparking accusations of cultural appropriation. Critics noted that the sandwich, as served in bodegas prior to the interest generated in the media, was generally priced at $4 or $5, while the versions offered by upscale purveyors were often two to three times that.

== In popular culture ==
The chopped cheese has made its way into hip hop culture, being featured in or the subject of many songs. Harlem rapper Cam'ron filmed his music video "Child of the Ghetto" at Hajji's Deli.

The chopped cheese is referenced in Will Trent, season 3, episode 10, as the stomach contents of a victim.

The sandwich has also been the topic of a documentary on the website First We Feast. The documentary Hometown Hero: The Legend of New York's Chopped Cheese discusses the origins of the sandwich and its cultural history. In the documentary, the sandwich is referred to as "Harlem's favorite".

== See also ==
- Cheesesteak
- Horseshoe sandwich
- List of American sandwiches
- List of sandwiches
- Mitraillette
- Roti john
- Sloppy joe
