= Chip butty =

Sandwich made with chips

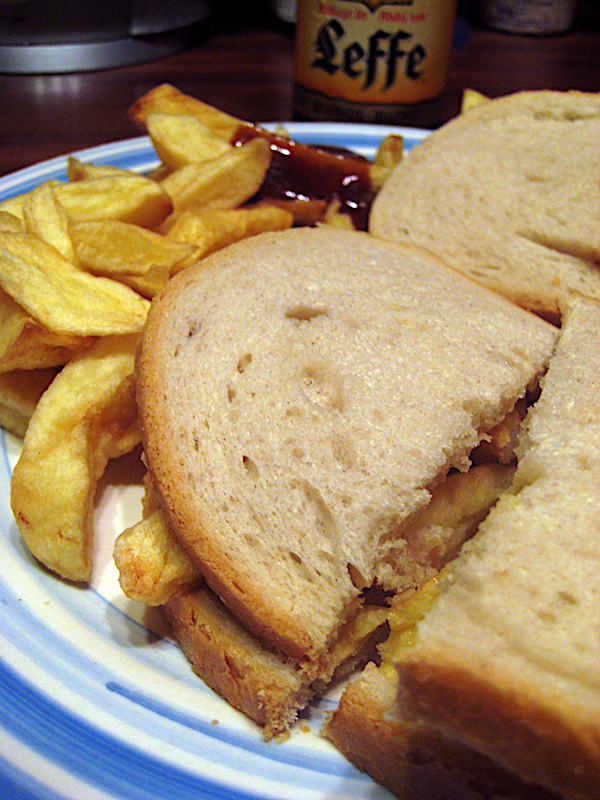
- Alternative names: Chip barm, chip bap, chip bun, chip sarnie, chip muffin
- Type: Sandwich
- Place of origin: United Kingdom
- Main ingredients: Bread, butter, chips

A chip butty is a sandwich filled with chips. It originated in fish and chip shops in Britain in the 19th century.

== Sandwich ==
The chip butty is a sandwich filled with chips, often served with malt vinegar, curry sauce, gravy or ketchup. The British food writer Tim Hayward recommended using "undistinguished" soft white bread, as "this is not the place for artisanal sourdough". In The Guardian, Tony Naylor recommended using buttered soft white bread and lightly fried chips seasoned with salt and vinegar, and serving the sandwich with a cup of tea. Naylor wrote that the chip butty was a comforting meal and a means to "transport ourselves to a happier, more innocent place". In 2022, a 2,000-person study carried out at Nottingham Trent University found that the ideal chip butty contained 12 chips.

The Michelin-starred chef Paul Ainsworth created a version with sourdough, triple-cooked chips, mayonnaise and parmesan. In 2020, the fast food franchise Burger King began selling chip butties in New Zealand. In 2024, The Guardian reported that the chip butty had become popular in Australian cafes during the cost-of-living crisis.

== Origins ==
The chip butty originated in working-class communities in Britain during the 19th century, though its exact origins are unknown. According to the National Federation of Fish Fryers, it was created in 1863 in Oldham, Lancashire, at Mr Lees, the second-ever fish and chip shop in Britain. The term "chip barm" began appearing in print in the 20th century, likely the result of the surge in popularity of fish and chips in the 1900s. Yorkshire and Liverpool have also been suggested as potential origins; the word "butty" is said to have originated in Yorkshire as slang for butter, or in Liverpool as a dialect elision of "buttery". In the north of England, the easier access to fuel and the closer proximity to the potato supply of Ireland meant chips could be produced cheaply in large quantities.

== Culture ==
The chip butty is associated with British working-class culture. The anthropologist Kate Fox wrote in her book Watching the English: "Even if you call it a chip sandwich rather than a butty, it is about as working-class as food can get." "The Greasy Chip Butty Song", a football chant that glorifies South Yorkshire, includes the chip butty as a Yorkshire invention.

In 2010, writers for the American media organisation NPR made a chip butty, having learnt of it from the National Geographic, and concluded that it was "less gross than they expected". In 2018, the American website Food Insider attracted mockery from British social media users when it appeared to discover the chip butty. Similar dishes have appeared in other countries, including the "fake burger" sold by Burger King Japan, the Turkish patso, the South African Gatsby, and the Belgian mitraillette.

== See also ==
- Crisp sandwich, a sandwich filled with crisps
- French tacos, a French fast-food item containing French fries (chips) wrapped in a flour tortilla
- List of sandwiches
- Mitraillette, a Belgian sandwich filled with chips
- Po' boy, a sandwich from Louisiana sometimes filled with French fries
- Primanti Bros. sandwich, an American restaurant known for its signature sandwiches made with French fries between two thick slices of Italian bread
