= St. Paul sandwich =

Sandwich in American Chinese cuisine

- A St. Paul sandwich
- Type: Sandwich
- Place of origin: Missouri
- Main ingredients: White bread, egg foo young patty, pickle slices, white onion, mayonnaise, lettuce, tomatoes

The St. Paul sandwich can be found in many Chinese American restaurants in St. Louis, Missouri, as well as in other cities in Missouri, including Columbia, Jefferson City, and Springfield. The sandwich consists of an egg foo young patty (made with mung bean sprouts and minced white onions) served with dill pickle slices, white onion, mayonnaise, and lettuce between two slices of white bread. The St. Paul sandwich also comes in different combinations and specials, such as chicken, pork, shrimp, beef, and other varieties.

== Origin ==
One source has the origin of the St. Paul sandwich dating to the early 1940s, when Chinese restaurants created the sandwich as a unique dish that was in a more familiar sandwich form to appeal to the palates of Midwestern Americans, an early example of fusion cuisine. According to local legend, the St. Paul sandwich was invented by Steven Yuen at Park Chop Suey in Lafayette Square, a neighborhood near downtown St. Louis; Yuen named the sandwich after his hometown of St. Paul, Minnesota.

Food writers James Beard and Evan Jones believed that the Denver or Western sandwich was created by "the many Chinese chefs who cooked for logging camps and railroad gangs in the nineteenth and early twentieth centuries" and was probably derived from egg foo young. They think that the early Denver sandwiches had the same ingredients as what were later known as St. Paul sandwiches in St. Louis and a few other Missouri cities.

This sandwich was featured in the PBS documentary Sandwiches That You Will Like in 2003. It was featured in a 2016 book by artist Kelly Pratt, called Stately Sandwiches, as the sandwich chosen to represent the state of Missouri.

== Availability ==
It is usually only available in Chinese restaurants in the St. Louis metropolitan area as well as a select few Chinese American restaurants in outlying regions of Missouri, the owners of which are typically originally from St. Louis.

As of 2024 it is not in the Minneapolis-St. Paul area.

== See also ==
- Bánh mì
- Chow mein sandwich
- Denver sandwich
- List of American sandwiches
- List of egg dishes
- List of regional dishes of the United States
- List of sandwiches
- Roti john
- Cuisine of St. Louis
