= Man v. Food season 2 =

Man v. Food
- Season 2
- No. of episodes: 20

Release
- Original network: Travel Channel
- Original release: August 5 – December 16, 2009

Season chronology
- ← Previous; Season 1 Next → Season 3

The second season of Man v. Food, an American food reality television series hosted by Adam Richman on the Travel Channel, premiered on August 5, 2009. First-run episodes aired in the United States on the Travel Channel on Wednesdays at 10:00 PM Eastern time. Man v. Food was executive produced by Matt Sharp in association with the Travel Channel. The season contained 20 episodes and finished airing on December 16, 2009. On February 3, 2010, a special "Live" episode aired.

Man v. Food is hosted by actor and food enthusiast Adam Richman. In each episode, Richman explores the "big food" of a different American city before facing off against a pre-existing eating challenge at a local restaurant. Not counting the "Live" episode in Miami (which he won), the final second season tally was: 13 wins for "Man" and 7 wins for "Food".

== Production ==
The second season was first rumored in March 2009 when the Anchorage Daily News said that people from the show had contacted the owners of the Pepper Mill, home to "Fat Andy's Pizza Challenge". This challenge, still unmet after two years and 50 attempts, requires two people to eat a 12-pound (5.4 kg) two-meat, two-cheese pizza in one hour or less. A successful challenger would win $500 in cash and have their photo posted on "Fat Andy's Wall of Pain". The challenge pizza, equivalent to four standard large pizzas, costs $49.99 and requires a full half-hour to bake. Although Anchorage was visited this season, the "Fat Andy's Pizza Challenge", however, was not aired.

As for filming dates, shortly after season one finished airing, Richman told an interviewer: "They [Travel Channel] want to start up again in May. It doesn't leave a lot of time for me". Season 2 started filming in Sarasota, Florida, on May 2, 2009.

== Reception ==
Joe Killian, culture critic for the Greensboro News-Record, wrote: "Caught the second-season premiere of Man v. Food last night and I've got to say, I think I'm hooked". Christopher Lawrence of the Las Vegas Review-Journal described Richman as "impressive" and "likable" saying "think a beefier Fred Savage, although one who somehow weighs less than he did last season". On his mastery of the spicy sushi roll challenge in Charleston, South Carolina, Katie Koch of the Charleston City Paper said: "This is a feat only an insane or highly admirable person could accomplish". After detailing Richman's ice cream challenge in the San Francisco episode, Joshua Gillin of the St. Petersburg Times noted humorously: "He is definitely one person who will be dropped by his health insurance". Jonathan Bernstein of British newspaper The Guardian described "mixed feelings" about the series saying he likes "the concept" and "the guy" but that the challenges make him "a little uneasy". Emley Kerry of Tiger Weekly wondered, "Why isn't he fatter? Or just dead?"

== Episodes ==
Episode	Episode Number	Original Air Date	Winner
San Antonio, TX	1 (19)	August 5, 2009	Man
Adam traveled to San Antonio, the home of the Alamo, in early June to tape the season 2 premiere. Adam visited Lulu's Bakery and Café to examine the plate-sized chicken fried steak and sample one of their famous 3.5-pound (1.6 kg) cinnamon rolls (after the episode aired, Lulu's began shipping the cinnamon rolls statewide to meet popular demand). The chicken fried steak is as big as a plate and can be topped with gravy or homemade cheddar cheese queso. A six-foot slab of dough is slathered in butter, cinnamon and sugar, which is mixed together. The dough is then rolled and the cinnamon rolls cut and baked. They are then buttered again and topped with frosting. His next stop was Big Lou's Pizza for the barbecue brisket pizza and to tackle the "Big Lou Super 42". Adam sat down with Lou's extended family to try one of the restaurant's signature 3.5-foot (1.1 m), 30-pound (14 kg) monster supreme pizzas. Six pounds of cheese are followed by pepperoni, Canadian bacon, beef, Italian sausage, peppers, onions, black and green olives, tomatoes, fresh garlic and a final layer of cheese. It is so big that it has to be baked on a custom made conveyor belt. This episode's challenge, taped on Wednesday, June 3, was to complete the Four Horsemen Challenge at Chunky's Burgers & More. Adam had to eat one of Chunky's ultra-hot Four Horsemen Burgers in 25 minutes, then wait for an additional 5-minute "burn period" before he could drink or eat anything to cool himself off. The Four Horsemen Burger is a half-pound (0.23 kg) burger topped with sautéed jalapeño, serrano and ghost chili peppers, which are then covered in melted cheese and drenched in habanero sauce. The burger is so hot that while over 100 people had taken the challenge, up to this point only three had finished it. To psych himself up for the challenge, Adam went skeet shooting using burgers as targets. Wearing latex gloves to prevent spice burns, he was stopped by the first bite and was sweating and visibly in pain for over six minutes. Adam made a comeback, though, and managed to finish the spicy burger in time. He completed the five-minute waiting period before gulping milk to quench the flames, becoming the fourth person to complete this challenge. For his efforts, Adam's photo was added to the restaurant's "Wall of Flame". Adam later described this as the most excruciatingly painful challenge he had ever successfully completed. NOTE: Lulu's Bakery and Café reappeared on the show in 2019, 10 years later, in which the show's new host, Casey Webb, took on the Cinnamon Roll Challenge, attempting to eat one of the 3-1/2 pound cinnamon rolls in one sitting. Post-episode update: Lulu's Bakery and Café initially closed in March 2020 due to the COVID-19 pandemic. It permanently closed and liquidated assets in April 2021.
Las Vegas, NV	2 (20)	August 12, 2009	Food
Adam went to Las Vegas, Nevada, in early May to hit one of a kind local joints. He first tried the fried chicken eggs Benedict at Hash House a go go. Known for their Vegas twist on comfort food, Hash House a Go Go serves huge portions for breakfast, lunch and dinner. Their breakfast offerings are mammoth and feature a culinary upgrade. Items such as 16 inch pancakes, meatloaf hash, bacon filled waffles, banana and brown sugar flapjacks and griddled french toast. A half pound chicken breast is breaded and deep fried. The fried chicken eggs benedict starts with griddled mashed potatoes, pasta, house made biscuits, tomatoes, spinach, hickory smoked bacon. The fried chicken breast is then placed and topped with scrambled eggs, grilled mozzarella cheese, scratch made chipotle cream sauce and rosemary garnish. He then visited Hot'n'Juicy Crawfish for Spicy crawfish. The crawfish is topped with a special proprietary secret sauce. There are five levels of heat to the sauce. The crawfish are poured directly into a pot with the selected boiling sauce. The crawfish are scooped into a plastic bag which helps steam flavor into the crawfish and then served to the customer. This episode's challenge was to eat the 2-foot, 6-pound Big Badass Burrito at the NASCAR Café in the Sahara Hotel and Casino in an hour and a half. Over 140 people have tried it prior to Adam's attempt, but only two had finished it. Adam's challenge was to become the third person to finish the burrito. Anybody who completes the challenge wins a "Conqueror" T-shirt and "lifetime access to the Sahara's roller coaster". The burrito is constructed with four 16-inch burritos and a base of lettuce, rice, beans, cheese and jalapenos is laid down. 9-hour braised beef and nacho cheese sauce is added and the burrito rolled up. It is then topped with beef broth, more nacho cheese sauce, tomatoes, black olives, scallions and scoops of sour cream and guacamole. Adam finished two pounds in the first 10 minutes. But, at the 35 minute mark, Adam hit the food wall and ultimately failed, surrendering with only a pound of the burrito remaining. For that, he was forced to wear a pink "Certified Weenie" T-shirt and get his picture posted on the café's "Weenie Wall of Shame". After taping for the challenge was complete, Adam spent an hour on a treadmill, telling the Las Vegas Review-Journal: "Being sedentary is incredibly uncomfortable. Despite the fact that the first 10 minutes or 15 minutes on the treadmill might suck, it actually does alleviate a lot of pressure, and you feel better". The Hash House A-Go-Go taping took place on Friday, May 8, and the NASCAR Café challenge was taped on Saturday, May 9. Post-episode update: The NASCAR Cafe was demolished as part of the demolition and renovation of the former Sahara Hotel and Casino in 2013.
Charleston, SC	3 (21)	August 19, 2009	Man
Adam journeyed to Charleston, South Carolina, for Lowcountry cuisine. This included a fried chicken sandwich with sausage gravy known as the "Big Nasty" at Hominy Grill and a shovel full of oysters at Bowen's Island. Plus this episode's challenge at Bushido; Hominy Grill is known for cooking Southern staples with a South Carolina flair. Adam first tried the shrimp and grits. Shrimp are dredged in flour and fried in a pan with double cut bacon, mushrooms, pressed garlic, a mixture of tabasco and lemon juice and topped scallions. They are then poured onto a bed of grits. To make the "Big Nasty," oil and bacon fat are heated in a pan. A buttermilk soaked chicken breast is then dredged and put into the pan. They fry the chicken in a skillet instead of a deep fryer in order to set themselves apart. The fried chicken breast is then placed on a homemade biscuit and topped with shredded white cheddar cheese and sausage gravy. Bowen's Island has been open since 1946. They source their oysters from the nearby mud flats. Before trying the oysters, Adam joins a local oysterman in harvesting them from the mud flats. The freshly caught oysters are then placed on a steel plate cooking apparatus behind the restaurant, drenched in water and covered in soaking wet burlap sacks and steamed. Adam then sits down with the owner to eat the freshly steamed oysters which are served with a shovel. They enjoy them along with fried boar stew which is a mixture of boiled shrimp, sausage, potatoes and corn. Adam arrived in Charleston on Sunday, May 24, taped a segment for the "Baseball Special" to air later this season on Tuesday, May 26, visited Bowen's Island on Wednesday, May 27, and tape the challenge at Bushido on Friday, May 29. The Charleston City Paper reported that "locals who have completed the challenge got first dibs on reservations [at Bushido] for the special night". To complete the challenge, one had to eat 10 spicy tuna rolls wrapped in nori with sticky rice and cucumber strips that escalate from mild to "feels like someone decided to light a match and burn you alive from the inside out". The three spiciest rolls also have a different pepper added to the roll; the "Level 8" sauce is made with a habanero pepper, then the "Level 9" sauce makes use of a green Thai chili, and finally, "Level 10" (Bushido's hottest sauce) uses a red Thai chili. This challenge had no time limit and most who complete it do so one roll per visit over several days or weeks, thereby earning the title of "warrior". Adam had to eat all 10 rolls in one evening (which would earn him the title of "legend" if he did so), a feat accomplished by only eight people out of 475 before him. Those who complete the challenge, both "warriors" and "legends", receive a commemorative headband and the honor of the Bushido staff bowing to them in subsequent visits, while "legends" get their picture on the restaurant's "Legends of the Roll" wall. Despite the intense pain of the escalating levels of the spicy tuna, Adam - taking some past winners' advice to eat the rolls quickly - managed to finish all 10 rolls in 16 minutes and 25 seconds (a new record set at Bushido), becoming the ninth person to win the title of "legend." Post-episode update: According to the restaurant's website, the Hominy Grill has closed for good, though their online shop is still open.
San Francisco, CA	4 (22)	August 26, 2009	Man
Adam visited San Francisco in mid-June. His stops included the Taquería La Cumbre, where he tried the 2-pound Mission Style Super Burrito while dressed in a sombrero and Mexican-style clothing. They are known for inventing the Mission style super sized burrito. Adam chose half servings of carne asada and polo asada to be added to his burrito. Each burrito starts with the tortilla pressed in a comal, jack cheese, beans, pico de gailo and other ingredients along with the desired proteins. He then visited sandwich shop Ike's Place on June 21, where he sampled the Kryptonite Sandwich, a 4-pound sandwich that starts with dirty sauce, a mayo based sauce mixed with garlic and spices. It is then filled with 13 ingredients, starting with pepper jack cheese. Five different meats (roast beef, ham, turkey, pepperoni and corned beef) are added before it is baked. Then bacon, two whole avocados, mozzarella sticks, onion rings and jalapeño poppers are added. This episode's challenge took place at the San Francisco Creamery in nearby Walnut Creek, California, where Adam attempted the "Kitchen Sink Challenge", a 2-gallon sundae consisting of 8 scoops of ice cream, 8 different toppings, and 8 servings of whipped cream, all served on a "kitchen sink". If he could finish the sundae in an hour, he would receive a spot on the creamery's Wall of Fame and be allowed free ice cream there for a year. Prior to Adam's attempt, 150 people took the challenge, but only four had succeeded. To prepare himself for the challenge, Adam ate a "magical" sugar cube and fantasized himself as a 1970s-style hippie chasing a walking ice cream cone. Bananas were cut up into the sink, followed by orange sherbert, sprinkles, vanilla ice cream, cake mix and swiss milk chocolates ice cream followed by hot fudge, whippped cream and almonds. During the challenge itself, Adam got off to a strong start but about halfway through, he began to struggle; he helped his cause by eating some fries (which was allowed) to help neutralize the level of sugar intake some, but even after finishing all the ice cream, he still had to consume the melted ice cream that fell onto his tray. While very nearly giving up, Adam summoned the strength to slurp it all and he ultimately won the challenge at the 45-minute mark. His picture was then taken and posted on the creamery's Wall of Fame. NOTE: A week after this episode aired, another challenger took on the Kitchen Sink Challenge and defeated it in an unprecedented 7 minutes, thereby prompting the Creamery to lower the challenge's time limit from an hour to 30 minutes. A year later, the time limit was reset to an hour since no one succeeded in beating the challenge during that period. As a new condition, each person to defeat the challenge will set a new time for the next challenger to come.
Durham, NC	5 (23)	September 2, 2009	Food
Adam visited Durham, North Carolina, in late May 2009 to showcase local cuisine as a follow-up to season one's North Carolina episode. Adam visited Backyard BBQ Pit, Durham's only open-pit barbecue, on the evening of Thursday, May 21. He helped prepare and sampled Eastern North Carolina chopped pork barbecue. He helped chop the hickory and oak wood that is burned down and cooks the pork butts. Once the bones are separated, chili flakes, salt, secret spices, hot sauce and distilled vinegar are added to the meat and the pork is all mixed and not chopped. Adam visited Wimpy's Grill in West Durham to try the Garbage Burger, a 1.25-pound (0.57 kg) bacon double-cheeseburger with the works including chili and coleslaw, on the morning of Tuesday, May 19. There are no tables or chairs and the food is eaten on a tailgate or sitting on the curb. The burgers are ground by a unique method every day before grilling. Adam first tried the Carolina Burger with chili, mustard, onion and coleslaw. On May 23, Adam fielded a four-person team, dubbed "MvF Food Fighters", in the Doughman, a 15-mile (24 km) relay race that has each team member at a different local restaurant where they eat a meal then perform "an athletic activity" including running, cycling, or swimming, then race to a central location where they meet up with their teammates, eat dessert together, then run to the finish line while holding hands. The "MvF Food Fighters" team included a cheerleader named Tiffany, a gymnast named Jordan, and Cincinnati Bengals linebacker and Travel Channel host Dhani Jones. For the 2009 Doughman race, the first leg started at Blu Seafood and Bar where Tiffany ate the Diablo Del Mar, a macaroni and cheese dish mixed with crab meat and topped with a fried egg, then ran 2 miles (3.2 km), swam a lap, then tagged Dhani. Dhani cycled 2 miles (3.2 km) to Four Square for the Bull City BLT sandwich then cycled another 5.5 miles (8.9 km) to Nosh to tag Adam, putting the MvF Food Fighters in 6th place. Adam ate Nosh's Triple Tomato Threat, a fried green tomato sandwich on sun-dried tomato bread with a tomato spread, before a 1.8-mile (2.9 km) run to Dain's Place Pub & Grub, during which he sprained his ankle on a curb, dropping his team to 23rd place, but he persisted and made it to Dain's, where he tagged the team's anchor, Jordan. There, Jordan ate the Portable Defibrillator, a half-pound (0.23 kg) cheeseburger covered with chili, bacon, a quarter-pound (0.11 kg) hot dog, and coleslaw, before a 2.5-mile (4.0 km) run to rejoin the team at Daisy Cakes, where the entire team had to eat four "Sunny Side-Ups", maple cupcakes topped with cinnamon cream cheese frosting made to look like a fried egg plus candied bacon, before running hand-in-hand two blocks to the finish line. The MvF Food Fighters placed 19th out of 51 entries, 16 minutes behind the winning team. Post-episode update: Wimpy's Grill closed in 2019 following the retirement of its owners. Post-episode update: Yelp users reported in 2019 that Blu Seafood and Bar had permanently closed. Post-episode update: Four Square closed in 2016 with the owners not citing a specific reason. Post-episode update: Daisy Cakes closed for good in 2015.
Honolulu, HI	6 (24)	September 9, 2009	Food
Adam visited Honolulu in late June to sample local restaurants and take on an existing "big food" challenge. Adam sampled the local cuisine at the Hukilau Cafe in Laie, where he tried the Hukilau Burger, a large burger topped with a fried egg, teriyaki beef, melted cheese and grilled onions. While there he also tried the "Loco Moco" - two burger patties served with two fried eggs and gravy over a bed of white rice. Adam also visited Helena's Hawaiian Food in Kalihi, where he sampled pipikaula short ribs and Laulau - pork and cod wrapped in Luau and ti leaves. The short ribs are soaked in soy sauce and then hung to dry for five hours. They are then pan fried. Meat from the pork shoulder and pork belly are placed inside the leaves along with a piece of black cod, known as butter fish. The meat is then sprinkled with course Hawaiian sea salt and the leaves tied. The leaf bundles are then steamed in a pot for over three hours. For this episode's challenge, taped Monday, June 29, Adam took on the Mac Daddy Challenge at Mac 24–7 at the Hilton Waikiki Beach Hotel. Adam had to eat 3 14-inch-diameter (360 mm) pancakes (which weigh in at 4 pounds) in an hour and a half without getting up from the table for any reason. At the time of the taping, only 4 people out of 297 had successfully completed this challenge. The pancake mix is mixed with water with a huge power tool with extra large beaters on the end. A full pound of any toppings from chocolate chips and pecans to macademia nuts and pineapple can be selected. The toppings are mixed into the pancake batter with more between each layer of pancake as well as on top. Adam chose blueberries and vanilla cream for his. The pancakes were also topped with butter, vanilla glaze and powdered sugar. Adam started off strongly, but halfway through it proved to be too much for him. Ultimately, despite the aid of bacon and coffee, his time ran out with roughly a pound of the pancakes remaining.
Sarasota, FL	7 (25)	September 16, 2009	Food
Adam visited Sarasota, Florida, where his exploration of that city's big food involved deep-fried hot dogs, homemade pies, and his first-ever "Mystery Challenge". Adam's first stop was at The Old Salty Dog in City Island. Opened in 1986 and located directly on Sarasota Bay, they are known for a mix of English pub grub and freshly grilled local fish. While there, he tried a fully loaded "Salty Dog", a hot dog dipped in beer batter, deep-fried and served on a bun while topped with onions, mushrooms, sauerkraut, bacon, and a mix of Swiss, American, Pepper Jack and Cheddar cheeses. Adam's next stop was at Yoder's Restaurant, which is well known for its Amish home cooking menu - especially their over 25 varieties of homemade, made from scratch pies. There, he tried fried chicken that was prepared in a special "pressure fryer." They use that to fry larger pieces of chicken quicker and keep them moist. For dessert, Adam had a piece of their homemade peanut butter cream pie. Chunky peanut butter is mixed with powdered sugar to form peanut butter crumbs. A layer of this mixture is poured in a pie crust and covered with a thick layer of vanilla pudding. More peanut butter crumbs are poured on top of the pudding followed by thick globs of whipped cream. The pie is finished with a final layer of peanut butter crumbs. Adam sat down with the owner to enjoy a slice of the pie. All of the recipes are created by the owner who explains that Amish home cooking is done with no preservatives, no cake or pie crust mixes and everything is made from scratch. This episode's challenge was at Muncies 4:20 Cafe, which is recognized for its stuffed "fat sandwiches" including the "Fat Sandy" (which consists of 2 cheeseburgers topped with chicken fingers, mozzarella sticks, onion rings, fries, and macaroni and cheese) and their biggest sandwich, the "Super Fat Daddy" (which has 6 cheeseburgers topped with fries, mozzarella sticks, chicken fingers, a pound of Philly steak, mushrooms, onions, and peppers, 17 slices of cheese, all mixed together and smothered in a cheddar cheese sauce). However, the café's Mystery Challenge itself was revealed to be the Fire In Your Hole Challenge - 10 chicken wings deep-fried and doused in an intensely fiery sauce consisting of habanero pepper, hot sauce, cayenne pepper, chili powder, crushed red pepper, garlic, and ghost chili extract. Adam had to eat these wings in 20 minutes without the aid of milk (water was allowed in sips), and if he could succeed, he would get his picture on the "Wall of Pain". Unlucky for Adam, however, the wings proved way too hot for him, as he went for the milk and gave up the challenge after only two wings. Therefore, his picture was posted on the café's "Hall of Shame" along with the other 95% of challengers who have failed this challenge previously. Adam was in so much pain after his attempt that he wound up standing inside a freezer while drinking a gallon of cold milk, as he quickly admitted defeat. He had said that these wings were the hottest thing he had ever eaten and this challenge was the hardest he ever attempted. This is the only spicy food challenge that Adam has failed. In later interviews, Adam said that Munchies 4:20 Café sabotaged him by using an entire bottle of the extract in order to "smoke him out". Post-episode update: Muncies 4:20 Cafe permanently closed in September 2025 due to financial difficulties caused by the inability to recover from the effects of Hurricane Helene and Milton.
Philadelphia, PA	8 (26)	September 23, 2009	Man
Adam visited Philadelphia in late July to tape this episode. Adam's journey began at Tommy DiNic's Roast Beef and Pork at the Reading Terminal Market, where he tried their signature Roast Pork Sandwich. Located several blocks from City Hall, the market spans 60,000 square feet and boasts nearly 80 food and merchandise vendors. DiNic's is famous for their slow roasted meets from pulled pork to brisket. The Roast Pork Sandwich features slow roasted pork shoulder, sharp provolone cheese and broccoli rabe. The hams are roasted in their own juices for five hours before cooling overnight. They are then sliced and drenched in a vat of hot pork gravy. The pork, cheese and broccoli rabe are then splashed with gravy and served on a toasted french baguette. The production crew also spent two days taping at Franklin Fountain, an "old school" ice cream scoop shop in Old City. Opened in 2004, Franklin Fountain is known for classic ice cream concoctions and new fangled sundae creations. Adam sampled the "Franklin Mint", a sundae consisting of mint chocolate chip ice cream (which Adam said is his all-time favorite flavor of ice cream), marshmallow cream, bittersweet fudge, crème de menthe syrup, and whipped cream; while there he also took on the "Mt. Vesuvius", a large sundae made with vanilla ice cream, homemade brownie pieces, hot fudge, malt powder, and whipped cream. This week's challenge took place at Tony Luke's, where Adam became the first person to ever attempt to eat the Ultimate Cheesesteak: a 5-pound cheesesteak made with 2 pounds, 10 ounces of 100% aged ribeye beef, 1 pound, 2 ounces of American cheese (which Adam chose over the traditional Cheez Whiz), half a pound of fried onions, and stuffed inside a 1-foot, 8-inch bun. This creation is the rough equivalent of 6 normal-sized cheesesteaks. Adam had to eat the Ultimate Cheesesteak in under an hour to get his picture posted on the Wall of Fame. At Adam's request, Tony also took on this challenge (using Cheez Whiz instead of American cheese). The duo started off strong, with Adam devouring 3 pounds in 11 minutes, but later it became a struggle. Tony bowed out of the challenge after consuming two-thirds of his cheesesteak. But Adam kept fighting, finishing his 4th pound at the 19-minute mark. To further help his cause, Adam used hot sauce on the last pound of his cheesesteak, a tactic that served him well as he easily finished the entire challenge in 28 minutes. For his victory, Adam received a T-shirt and got his picture posted on the Wall of Fame as the first person to ever successfully complete this challenge. Post-episode update: In 2022, the original Tony Luke's store underwent a name change due to a split among family members after a dispute that occurred in 2015. It is not affiliated with the Tony Luke's brand or franchise company which still operate several stores around the country.
Baseball Special	9 (27)	September 30, 2009	Man
Adam visited minor league baseball stadiums in three different cities to sample their unique food offerings. On July 22, Adam attended a Gateway Grizzlies game at GCS Ballpark in Sauget, Illinois (just across the river from St. Louis, Missouri). There, he tried the so-called "Baseball's Best Burger" (said to be the invention of singer Luther Vandross), a quarter-pound burger with cheddar cheese and two slices of bacon served between two halves of a Krispy Kreme doughnut. While sitting down to watch the Grizzlies play, Adam also sampled some Philly Cheesesteak Nachos, also known as "Baseball's Best Nachos", which is a bed of "tri-colored" nachos topped with a mixture of philly steak, grilled peppers and onions, and a creamy Monterey Jack cheese sauce. Adam also visited Joesphe P. Riley Park "The Joe" in Charleston, South Carolina, for a Charleston RiverDogs game on May 26. The park features four unique hot dog stands, each offering their own unique gourmet hot dog - from the bacon, onion and barbeque Old Smokey Dog to the peanut butter, honey and banana Elvis Dog. There, he tried "The Homewrecker", a foot-long, half-pound hot dog with up to 25 toppings, including chili, jalapeño cheese, coleslaw, pimento cheese, and pickled okra. On July 15, Adam went to Fifth Third Ballpark in Comstock Park, Michigan (just north of Grand Rapids), the home of the West Michigan Whitecaps, to throw out the game's ceremonial first pitch and take on the Fifth Third Burger. The Fifth Third Burger is made with 5 1/3-pound burger patties and topped with American cheese, nacho cheese sauce, chili, lettuce, tomatoes, salsa, sour cream, and tortilla chips, all stuffed inside an 8-inch, 1-pound sesame seed bun. To win a commemorative "Call 911" T-shirt and get his photo posted on the Wall of Fame, Adam had to finish this 5-pound burger in under the final 2 1/2 innings of the Whitecaps game (that is, after the seventh inning stretch). Clad in a customized Whitecaps jersey, Adam nearly lost the challenge with one strike left to go, but a foul ball allowed him to finish the last bite with no time to spare. As of the time of the taping, 1,213 Fifth Third Burgers had been sold with Adam becoming just the 157th person to earn the T-shirt. Post-episode update: Fifth Third Ballpark officially retired the Fifth Third Burger in September 2018 after offering it for ten seasons.
Springfield, IL	10 (28)	October 7, 2009	Man
The sign at the Cozy Dog Drive In, featuring the original logo Adam traveled to Springfield, Illinois, the state capital, to try the horseshoe sandwich at D’Arcy's Pint, a deep-fried battered hot dog on a stick at the Cozy Dog Drive In, and the Firebrand Chili Challenge at Joe Rogers' Original Recipe Chili Parlor. Located on Route 66 in Springfield, the Cozy Dog Drive In claims to be the first place to serve the corn dog, which there they call the "Cozy Dog". Three hot dogs are fastened in a patented rack and dipped into a secret corn batter recipe. They are then deep fried in vegetable oil. Adam also went to D'Arcy's Pint to experience the classic "Horseshoe" sandwich, which is meat (any kind may be used), cheese sauce, and crinkle-cut fries served open-faced on Texas toast. D'Arcy's Pint serves up to 700 of the sandwiches a day with people able to choose from 50 different varieties. Adam first tried the "Hamburger Horseshoe" with a hamburger patty on the Texas Toast and then topped with the fries and restaurant's secret cheese sauce, consisting of melted butter and a top secret blend of spices and seasonings are combined with milk and cheddar cheese. Adam also ate the Spicy Supreme horseshoe sandwich that contains two pounds of "ground beef, bacon bits, tomatoes, scallions and a spicy cheese sauce". For this episode's challenge, Adam tried to eat 6 bowls of extra-spicy Firebrand chili at Joe Rogers' Chili Parlor to beat the record of 5 bowls. Each serving of the chili weighs 3/4 to one pound. 150 pounds of red beans are seasoned and simmered in a giant vat. 10 pounds of ground beef is then browned in a savory cooking oil. Joe Roger's Firebrand spice mixture containing paprika, cumin, garlic, salt, onion and secret spices in then added to the ground beef. The spicy ground beef mixture is added to a bowl of red beans. Anybody able to finish even one bowl of the Firebrand chili, which is said to be 9 times hotter than regular chili, has their names posted on the restaurant's wall. This challenge had no time limit. Adam fought hard, in pain from the spiciness of the chili, and while he did not break the record, he managed to eat 5 bowls of the chili, tying the record. The show was taped at D’Arcy's Pint on Friday, July 17, at the Cozy Dog Drive-In on Saturday, July 18, and Joe Rogers' on Monday, July 20. Post-episode update: Joe Rogers' Chili Parlor was sold in 2015. The new owners changed the name to simply The Chili Parlor and then The Den, but maintained the tradition of the original Rogers chili recipe.
Boise, ID	11 (29)	October 14, 2009	Man
Adam visited Boise, Idaho, the home of hockey's Idaho Steelheads, in mid-August with stops at Big Jud's, Flying Pie Pizzeria, and Rockies Diner. At the first stop, Big Jud's, known for the large and unique burgers, such as the Reuben Burger which features pastrami, swiss cheese, sauerkraut and thousand island dressing, Adam tried the Double Big Jud. That huge sandwich consists of two 1-pound burger patties stacked on top of one another with various toppings (Adam's picks included blue cheese, Swiss cheese, sauteed mushrooms and onions and bacon in addition to the standard lettuce, tomatoes, pickles, onions, ketchup, mustard and mayonaisse) and stuffed between a large bun. Altogether, the burger weighs roughly 4 pounds (1.8 kg). At Flying Pie Pizzeria, known for their unique toppings and creative combinations, Adam tried the ultra-spicy Triple Habanero Pizza (which features a sauce made with 18 habanero peppers) during the August 14 taping. Opened in 1978, the restaurant is legendary for their original pizza creations such as Greek style lamb, feta and onion, and Tangy Southwestern Chicken Chili Lime. The base of the Triple Habanero Pie has tomato sauce, cheddar and mozzarella cheese and grilled chicken. 18 full habanero peppers are blended (stems, skin, seeds included) are blended and spread over the pie with garlic and black olives finishing it off. The pizza is then baked in the restaurant's rotating oven. Adam then enjoyed the pizza with the Flying Pie owner. This episode's challenge, taped on August 11, took place at Rockies Diner, where Adam went up against the Johnny B. Goode Challenge - aka "The Rock" - which consists of the Johnny B. Goode Burger (3 1/3 pound burgers topped with Swiss and cheddar cheese, onions, pastrami, and a hot dog, all served open-faced on a toasted bun and smothered with chili), a 1 1/2-pound order of chili cheese fries, and a 16 ounce vanilla milkshake; altogether, the challenge weighs in at 6 1/2 pounds (2.95 kg), with the burger alone weighing roughly 4.5 pounds (2.0 kg). Adam had to finish this challenge in 30 minutes or less, and if he could do so, he would win his very own Fender guitar. At the time of the taping, 1,119 people had attempted the Johnny B. Goode Challenge, with only 30 having finished it. Prior to the challenge, Adam fantasized himself as a '50s-style rock n' roll musician performing in front of a crowd of screaming '50s-style fans (some holding food). During the challenge, he breezed through the Johnny B. Goode Burger, setting a new record by completing it in 10 minutes and 48 seconds, but struggled with the chili cheese fries. Adam was inspired to keep fighting after the manager showed him the guitar that was on the line, which Adam said "will be mine". Once he finished the fries, he only had 2 minutes to drink the milkshake, but ultimately was able to swallow the last gulp of milkshake right before time expired, giving him the victory. For his efforts, Adam was rewarded with a free T-shirt and the Fender guitar. Post-episode update: Rockies Diner closed in June 2020 when the owner stated he could not keep up with restaurant update payments.
Washington, DC	12 (30)	October 21, 2009	Man
Iconic front of Ben's Chili Bowl, Washington D.C. Adam visited Washington, D.C. in late August and early September. Stops included Ben's Chili Bowl, where you can get the chili in a bowl, on a burger or poured over fries or hot dogs. Ben's famous chili is made starting with 20 pounds of ground beef in a large pot and adding in a can of tomato paste. A bag of a secret spice mix is poured into the pot and water is added. Everything is mixed, while adding more water. It is then cooked for approximately 80 minutes. Adam tried the "Half-Smoke", a half-pork, half-beef frankfurter topped with mustard, chopped onions and chili. On September 1, Adam visited Horace & Dickie's Seafood Carry Out where they have been serving fried seafood since 1990. They are best known their signature fried fish (whiting) sandwich which has four filets on a standard sandwich. Adam went for a "jumbo" version, which has six filets and is topped with salt, pepper, hot sauce, coleslaw and tartar sauce and placed between eight slices of bread - four on the bottom, four on the top. The fish is dredged in a corn based fish meal mixed with secret spices and then deep fried. This episode's challenge, filmed on August 30, was the Colossal Challenge at Chick & Ruth's Delly in Annapolis, Maryland. Adam had to consume a 6-pound (2.7 kg) milkshake and a 1.5-pound (0.68 kg) cold cut sandwich or 1.5-pound (0.68 kg) burger in an hour. Adam chose a vanilla milkshake and a sandwich with 1 pound (0.45 kg) of turkey and 0.5 pounds (0.23 kg) of corned beef, a combination that normally costs $16.50 at the restaurant. The 116 ounce milkshake is made by pouring a half gallon of milk into five different batches. Half a gallon of ice cream is then added, followed by 12 ounces of syrup. Each batch is then blended and then poured into a two-foot high glass. To make things more interesting, Adam competed alongside local milkshake enthusiast and Chick & Ruth's regular Heather Wright. Heather chose the 1-1/2 pound burger and a "Moose Tracks" (chocolate and peanut butter) milkshake. Any person who beats the Colossal Challenge in under an hour is awarded a commemorative "I Survived the Chick & Ruth's Challenge" T-shirt. During the challenge, Heather started by ignoring her burger and going straight at her milkshake, while Adam alternated between his milkshake and the sandwich (only after suffering a brain freeze from sipping his shake too fast). Adam used Russian dressing to give his sandwich more flavor. About 25 minutes in, Heather gave up her challenge after drinking only a quarter of her milkshake and not even touching her burger. Adam finished his milkshake in 35 minutes, and at that point, had roughly a half-pound of his sandwich remaining. He finished his sandwich with only 10 minutes to go. Only two people out of "a few hundred" had successfully finished this challenge prior to this taping, and with his victory, Adam became just the third person to succeed.
Baltimore, MD	13 (31)	October 28, 2009	Food
Adam's first stop on his visit to Baltimore was at Chaps Pit Beef on Pulaski Highway, where he sampled pit beef which, like the rest of their barbequed meat, is flame grilled instead of smoked. Chaps makes their pit beef by grilling a bottom round of beef. Their famed Pit Beef Sandwich is made by slicing the char grilled bottom round thin and piled high on a kaiser roll. It is then topped with sliced onions and "Tiger Sauce" - a mixture of horseradish and mayonnaise. While there he also tried their 1-pound sandwich known as "The Raven", which consists of pit beef, corned beef, and turkey piled on a french roll and topped with American cheese, barbecue sauce, sliced onions, and the Tiger Sauce. Adam also visited Obrycki's Crab House and Seafood Restaurant at Fells Point to sample their crab cakes and their steamed blue crabs. Obrycki's makes their crab cakes with larger pieces of fresh crab held together by smaller pieces of crab along with eggs and seasoned bread crumbs. They are then deep fried in soybean oil. Every day, 2,000 blue crabs are sorted and seasoned with black pepper and Obrycki's secret spices. The crabs are then steamed in large vats for 15 minutes. The owner shows Adam how to find the tastiest crab meat in the claws. This episode's challenge was at Steak & Main, which is located an hour outside of Baltimore in North East, Maryland. There, Adam faced off with the Great Steak Challenge - 74 ounces of choice black angus steak (an 8-ounce filet mignon sliced from the tenderloin, a 12-ounce New York strip cut from the sirloin, two 13-ounce Delmonicos cut from the rib, a 16 ounce flat iron cut from the chuck, and a 12-ounce slice prime rib) plus a pound of sides (homemade mashed potatoes and creamed spinach). If he completed all the meat and sides in under an hour, Adam would win $100 in cash (and also the meal would be free). But, failure meant he would have to pay the entire $140 price tag of the meal. 24 challengers have tried this challenge prior to Adam's attempt, and up to this point only four had succeeded. During the challenge, Adam started strong, easily finishing the filet mignon and flat iron as well as both of his sides at the 15-minute mark. He then downed the prime rib in five more minutes, but started to struggled with the two Delmonicos. He managed to finish them at the 40-minute mark. That left him with only the New York strip, which gave him even more trouble. Though he fought hard, he ran out of time with only a couple of bites to go, and thus had to pay the $140 bill.
Detroit, MI	14 (32)	November 4, 2009	Food
Adam visited Detroit, Michigan, to take on the then world record 190-pound Absolutely Ridiculous Burger at Mallie's Sports Grill & Bar. Before the challenge, Adam tasted Coney Island (restaurant) hot dogs from American Coney Island and Lafayette Coney Island. The two restaurants were opened by members of the same extended family. American opened first. But, a dispute over the chili caused a family member to open competing Lafayette. Michigan law states that only cuts of meat can be used in a hot dog. Adam visits American Coney Island first where the owner ladles on saucy, Greek spiced chili onto the hot dog and adds Belgian mustard and fresh Vidalia onions. Adam then went right next door to Lafayette Coney Island to sample their version. The Lafayette version features thicker, meatier chili, vinegar mustard and Spanish onions. Adam was about to state his preference when his cell phone rang and he wisely declined to declare a favorite. He also visited Slows Bar-B-Q, known for their unique spins on regional barbeque classics. Adam tried their signature sandwich, the Triple Threat Pork, a nearly 1-pound sandwich made with Applewood smoked bacon, pulled pork and grilled ham on a poppyseed bun. He selected their orange pop BBQ sauce from their seven options to put on the sandwich. For the challenge, Adam fielded a team of 40 people, consisting of police officers, firefighters, local football, hockey and roller derby teams, union auto workers, professional wrestlers and a Kiss tribute band, to help him take on the Absolutely Ridiculous Burger in two hours. The huge burger was made by filling a specially made drum with 210 pounds of ground beef putting it into the oven to cook for 16 hours. Each bun weighs 20 pounds and combined with the cooked patty weigh 160 pounds. Ten pounds of cheese, 15 pounds of tomatoes, pickles and onion, four pounds of bacon and three whole heads of lettuce were added to complete the burger. Adam almost finished two three-pound plates, while a few team members went on to a third plate. The team managed to eat through 160 pounds of the burger, but ultimately they were unable to complete the challenge in the allotted time. Post-episode update: Mallie's Sports Grill & Bar closed on November 27, 2024, the day before Thanksgiving, in order to allow Mallie to focus on his family life, as well as due to declining patronage.
Brooklyn, NY	15 (33)	November 11, 2009	Man
Adam returned to his beloved hometown of Brooklyn, New York, to exact revenge on a challenge that had previously bested him. His first stop was Brennan and Carr in Gravesend, which is known for its signature Hot Beef Sandwich, a roast beef sandwich which is noted for its various usages of beef broth: one can choose to have just the beef dipped (known as a "dingle-dangle"), have both the beef and the bun dipped (known as a "double dip"), or choose the K.F.J. ("Knife and Fork Job") - pouring broth all over the sandwich, thus requiring the use of a knife and fork. While there, Adam tried their Gargiulo Burger, a burger topped with melted American cheese, roast beef, and sautéed onions, and also served with broth (with Adam choosing the double dip method); he sat down with Brooklyn borough president Marty Markowitz to enjoy the burger. Adam also visited L&B Spumoni Gardens pizzeria in Bensonhurst to try the Square Pizza, a Sicilian pizza that is noted for being prepared with mozzarella cheese topping the pizza before the tomato sauce. For this episode's challenge, Adam returned to Buffalo Cantina in Williamsburg for a rematch with the Suicide Six Wings Challenge, a challenge that Adam tried before the show premiered - and failed after just one bite. The wings were doused in a sauce made with jalapeño, serrano, chile de árbol, and habanero peppers, as well as a dose of chili pepper extract. Adam had to eat 6 of these wings in 6 minutes. Hundreds beside Adam had tried this challenge, but at the time of his rematch, only 10 had beaten it. Appearing at the restaurant to inspire Adam was New York Yankees pitcher Joba Chamberlain, who told Adam to "basically wing it" and just eat. During the challenge, Adam wore latex gloves on his hands to prevent any spice burns. He was almost stopped by the first wing again, but remembered Joba's advice and went on to finish all 6 wings in the allotted time, much to the delight of his hometown crowd. Post-episode update: Reviewers on Yelp and Foursquare have reported that Buffalo Cantina has permanently closed.
Anchorage, AK	16 (34)	November 18, 2009	Man
Adam journeyed north to Anchorage, Alaska. For his first stop, he visited the Roadhouse in Talkeetna to try the Roadhouse Standard, which consisted of scrambled eggs, home fries, peppered bacon and honey whole wheat toast; he enjoyed this dish with a side of sourdough pancakes. The Roadhouse will only scramble their eggs due to tradition. Adam then visited the West Rib Deli & Pub, also in Talkeetna, to try the Seward's Folly, a 4.5-pound double-stacked burger made with Caribou meat (in the form of two 1-pound patties) and topped with six slices each of American and Swiss cheese, 12 slices of bacon, a pound of ham, "Fatass Sauce" (made with mayonnaise, horseradish, bacon, and balsamic vinaigrette), caramelized onions, lettuce and tomatoes, and served inside a toasted sourdough bun. The burger is held together with a small Alaskan flag and served with a pound of seasoned fries. For this episode's challenge, Adam ventured into the city of Anchorage itself and visited Humpy's Great Alaskan Alehouse, where they serve up generous portions of Alaska's freshest catch from salmon to king crab. There, he took on the Kodiak Arrest Challenge, which consisted of 3 pounds of Alaskan king crab legs, a foot-long, 3/4-pound reindeer sausage, seven 2-ounce wild Alaskan salmon cakes, 6 ounces of sour-cream-and-chive mashed potatoes, 6 ounces of assorted sautéed vegetables, and mixed berry crisp (served à la mode) for dessert. Adam had to eat the entire 6-pound, 7-course meal in 90 minutes. Dozens have tried this challenge prior to Adam, but no one had ever defeated it. To make the salmon cakes, freshly baked salmon seasoned with salt and pepper is broken up into a bowl. It is then mixed with bread crumbs, vegetables and cheese. They are then formed into patties and fried in butter. The king crabs legs are boiled in a pot with lemon, a 12-spice blend and sherry. The reindeer sausage is also added to the pot to cook. During the challenge, Adam spent the first 15 minutes trying to shell the crab legs. But, he made up for the lost time by quickly downing the sausage and mashed potatoes. At the 22-minute mark, he had finished the salmon cakes and vegetables. Though he enjoyed the taste of the crab legs, they began to slow him down, But, at the 40-minute mark, he managed to finish the crab and make it to dessert. He ultimately finished with 43 minutes to spare. Adam received a commemorative "I Got Crabs at Humpy's" T-shirt and became the first person to ever defeat the challenge. Adam later went on to say that the Kodiak Arrest Challenge was his favorite challenge due to the variety of flavors that the challenge consisted of. NOTE: West Rib Deli & Pub and the Seward's Folly burger returned in 2019 10 years later, in which the show's new host, Casey Webb, took on the challenge.
Little Rock, AR	17 (35)	November 25, 2009	Man
Adam visited Little Rock, Arkansas. For his first stop, he visited the Osborne Family Farm to partake in their annual barbecue benefiting the Little Rock Police and Fire Departments. The huge barbecue platters that were served included an entire four-pound chicken, a dinosaur beef rib, brisket, six spicy sausages, a massive pulled pork sandwich and a huge 8-inch turkey leg. The barbeque is all done in a 25,000 square foot cooking barn equipped with 12 industrial sized ovens than can cook 11,000 pounds of barbeque at one time. The chicken is coated in pepper, garlic salt, onion salt and six different kinds of rubs before cooking. Each responder eats what they want and then shares the remainder with someone that could not attend or someone in need. Adam also visited Cotham's Mercantile in Scott, Arkansas, which is home to Southern home cooking. The biggest burger they serve is the Hubcap Burger, which is eight inches in diameter and weight nearly one pound. Adam tried the Quadruple Hubcap Cheeseburger, which involves four "hubcap" beef patties stacked on top of one another and topped with melted American cheese, pickles, lettuce and tomato. Adam ate his with a side of Cotham's double-dipped onion rings. This episode's challenge was the Shut-Up Juice Challenge, which took place at the Mean Pig BBQ in Cabot, Arkansas. Mean Pig BBQ's is best known for their pulled pork sandwiches and homemade barbecue sauces, which range from sweet and mild up to the super spicy "Shut Up Juice." Pork shoulders are smoked behind the restaurant in a homemade hickory wood fed smoker. It is then separated from the bone and mixed and seasoned with the restaurant's special dry rub. The challenge involves a large smoked pulled pork sandwich topped with coleslaw and six ounces of "Shut-Up Juice" - barbecue sauce mixed with a tablespoon of concentrated, undiluted habanero extract. Out of about 4,000 people who have previously tried this sandwich, only 64 people have finished it. This challenge had no time limit, and Adam was allowed to drink anything, but he had to finish the sandwich and hold it down for 5 minutes afterwards. If he could do so, he would get a commemorative T-shirt with the phrase "I Survived the Shut-Up Juice". To prevent spice burns during eating, Adam wore latex gloves. He also signed a waiver before the challenge. After only two bites, Adam felt intense pain from the Shut-Up Juice. He then picked up speed, but stopped again with only three bites left. Ultimately, though, he managed to take down the entire sandwich and survive the whole five-minute burn period. Thus, he won the T-shirt for his victory and became the 65th person to complete the challenge. In his "press release", Adam claimed that the Shut-Up Juice temporarily "shut him up", true to the challenge's name. Post-episode updates: The original Cotham's Mercantile location in Scott where the episode was filmed closed permanently when the building burned down in May 2017. A second location in downtown Little Rock remains open. Post-episode updates: Jennings Osborne, owner of the Osborne Family Farm, died in 2011 due to complications from heart surgery. All of the family's homes and possessions were then auctioned off.
Tucson, AZ	18 (36)	December 2, 2009	Man
Adam visited Tucson, Arizona, to tape this episode in late September. Adam sampled Mexican eats including a Sonoran hot dog at El Guero Canelo. Popularized in Tucson and elsewhere in Southern Arizona, the hot dog is named after the region of Mexico just across the border. It is wrapped in bacon and grilled in butter, served on a bolillo-style hot dog bun, and topped with pinto beans, onions, tomatoes, mayonnaise, mustard and jalapeño sauce. He continued his trek with a visit to Mi Nidito where he tried the "President's Plate", a combination platter consisting of a pinto bean tostada topped with queso fresco cheese, birria (shredded beef) taco, chile relleño (a chili stuffed with white cheddar that is fried and covered with tomato puree and jack cheese), a chicken enchilada and beef tamale which are also topped with the tangy tomato sauce. The birria is boiled in a pot with pickling spice, hot and mild chili pods, celery, onions and garlic for four hours. The platter was put together and named for then-United States president Bill Clinton when he paid a visit to the restaurant. Adam enjoyed the platter at the Presidential Table, the exact seat where Clinton ate his meal. This episode's challenge took place at Lindy's on Fourth on September 25 where he took on the O.M.G. Burger. Since 2004, Lindy's has served up monstrous and creative burger combinations, including the bacon and peanut butter burger and the mac and cheese burger. The O.M.G Burger started out as the six patty Hooligan burger, but the owners wanted something bigger. The O.M.G is a 3-pound burger made up of 12 quarter-pound patties, 6 slices each of Swiss and cheddar cheese, lettuce, tomato, diced onions and special, homemade chipotle sauce. Just 30 people out of 300 had finished the burger prior to this episode's taping. This challenge had no time limit and your photo is added to the Wall of Fame if you finish. As an added bonus, you get the meal for free if you can finish it in under 20 minutes. He started by eating the first five burger patties in three minutes, but soon struggled and was unable to meet the 20-minute bonus mark. However, he managed to rebound and ultimately went on to finish the entire burger in about 44 minutes. Though he had to pay the bill, Adam got his picture posted on the Wall of Fame.
New Brunswick, NJ	19 (37)	December 9, 2009	Food
Adam visited several locations in and around New Brunswick, New Jersey, home of Rutgers University. His first stop was at Harold's New York Deli Restaurant in nearby Edison. Harold's is known for serving up super sized deli portions, including giant Matza balls and cakes nearly two feet high. Adam tried their signature Triple Decker Sandwich, a nearly 10-pound, 1-foot-tall (0.30 m), 12-inch tall sandwich. Adam selected three pounds each of pastrami, corned beef, and turkey (the combo of pastrami and corned beef is collectively known as the "Abe Lebewohl", named for the founder of New York's Second Avenue Deli). Adam's second stop was at Stuff Yer Face in New Brunswick itself. Stuff Yer Face (where Mario Batali got his first job in the culinary industry as a dishwasher) is known for its nearly 30 varieties of stromboli, including the option to make your own stromboli. The strombolis come in three sizes, 4-1/2 inch, nine inch and 18 inches. Adam picked a "huge"-size (18 in.) stromboli and customized it with cheddar and brie cheeses, beef sirloin, grilled chicken, caramelized onions, fresh onions, tomatoes, spinach, ancho-chipotle sauce, roasted garlic spread and topped it with cheddar cheese. Altogether, Adam's stromboli weighed in at roughly 2 pounds. On October 10, Adam visited Rutgers University Homecoming, where he went up against the Fat Sandwich Challenge at R.U. Hungry?, one of Rutgers' famed Grease Trucks. His challenge was to eat five of their stuffed Fat Sandwiches, which are always topped with a handful of fries, in 45 minutes or less. Doing so would allow Adam to create and name his very own Fat Sandwich as well as earn him a spot on the Grease Trucks' Wall of Fame. From the nearly 20 options available, Adam picked a Chicken Fat Cat (grilled chicken strips, cheese, fries, lettuce, tomatoes, ketchup, and mayonnaise), a Veggie Fat Cat (same as the Chicken Fat Cat, except using deep-fried veggie burger patties instead of chicken), a Fat Romano (thin steak slices, over-easy egg, Taylor pork roll, fries, lettuce and tomatoes), and 2 Fat Kokos (steak, marinara sauce, mozzarella sticks and fries). Altogether, the five sandwiches weighed over seven pounds. Prior to Adam, around 250 people had tried the challenge, and 16 had succeeded. On hand to cheer Adam on and give him challenge advice was Rutgers alumnus Darrell Butler, creator of another one of R.U. Hungry's sandwiches, the Fat Darrell. In the challenge, Adam ate 4 1/2 sandwiches before he ran out of time: he ate the two Fat Kokos in the first 13 minutes, but struggled with the Fat Romano and Chicken Fat Cat, causing him to run out of time when he was halfway through the Veggie Fat Cat. The Fat Romano, named after Belleville, New Jersey, native Rich Romano, a Rutgers student in the mid-1990s (making it one of the first sandwiches to be named after a student), was Adam's ultimate undoing. During the "Greatest Moments" episode (which aired after the conclusion of the second season), Adam expressed his disappointment with not finishing this challenge, noting that he would have finished it if the time limit were an hour, and feeling like he had let the entire school down by failing the challenge.
Hartford, CT	20 (38)	December 16, 2009	Man
Adam visited Hartford, Connecticut. For his first stop, Adam visited Woody's in Downtown Hartford, which is well known for its various hot dog creations. Woody's features nine different hot dog combinations, including the habanero loaded "Chihuahua Dog" and the marinara sauce, mozzarella cheese and peppers topped "Dog Father." There, he tried a "Deputy Dog", a foot-long hot dog topped with pulled pork, cheddar cheese and barbecue sauce and served in a toasted bun. He also visited Doogie's Long Dogs and Fat Burgers in Newington, Connecticut, to try the "Doogie Dog", a 2-foot-long (0.61 m), char-grilled hot dog topped with sauteed onions and peppers, cheddar cheese sauce, chili and bacon and served on three German-style buns. Adam's next stop was at Ted's Restaurant in Meriden, Connecticut, where he tried a steamed cheeseburger. Ted's steams their five ounce square patties in a special rectangular tray inside the custom made steam cabinet. Steamed burgers tend to be leaner and juicy without being greasy. White cheddar cheese is then melted inside its own separate steam cabinet. The Vienna buns are prepped with various toppings and then the steamed burger and cheese are added. Adam also tried a side order of home fries that were also topped with melted and steamed white cheddar cheese. This episode's challenge took place at Randy's Wooster St. Pizza Shop in Manchester, Connecticut, which specializes in Connecticut style brick oven pizza with a thin, well cooked crust and fresh toppings. Adam took on the Stuffed Pizza Challenge: a 22-inch, 10-pound stuffed pizza. A three-pound bottom crust is then covered in a layer of mozzarella cheese, five different vegetables (onions, peppers, mushrooms, broccoli and spinach), two pounds of meat (including pepperoni, ground meatballs, sausage and bacon) and three more pounds of cheese (ricotta, pecorino romano and mozzarella). A one pound dough cap is then put on top. This was a two-person challenge, and Adam's partner was Greg Maloomian (aka "The Great Moomsi"), who previously completed this challenge. If they could finish the pizza in under an hour, they would get free T-shirts and hats and be allowed to sign the restaurant's challenge table. But, if they failed, they would have to sign the Hall of Shame. Out of 442 teams that have attempted this challenge prior to Adam and Greg, only two teams have succeeded (with Greg being on one of those teams). During the challenge, Adam tried eating the filling first and leaving the crusts for later, while Greg tackled whole slices. Greg finished all of his slices with 15 minutes left, but Adam struggled with the leftover crusts. Greg helped Adam with the crusts, and this tactic allowed the pair to finish the whole pizza with only one second left, ensuring their victory. This was Adam's first victory in the challenge, and Greg's second. Post-episode update: The owners of Woody's cited personal health reasons for closing the store for good in March 2018.

=== Man v. Food Live ===
Episode	Episode Number	Original Air Date	Winner
Miami, FL	Special	February 3, 2010	Man
During the initial airing of the season 2 finale in Hartford, Adam announced a "live" episode of Man v. Food to take place in Miami on February 3, 2010, just days before Super Bowl XLIV. The episode was set at the Alexander Hotel in Miami Beach, which featured a huge tailgate party with fans and live announcers. During the episode, Adam's visits to various Miami-area restaurants were chronicled; first, he visited Sarussi to try the "Sarussi Original", a 16-inch-long, 4-inch-high Cuban sandwich which featured 20 slices of baked ham, 15 slices of Cuban style roast pork that has roasted four hours in a marinade of citrus, garlic, onions and vinegar known as mojo, eight slices of mozzarella cheese and pickles topped with a proprietary secret sauce (vinegar, garlic and spices). Altogether, the sandwich ultimately weighed in at 2.5 pounds. Instead of ham, roast pork and swiss cheese grilled in a press, the Sarussi Original uses mozzarella and is baked in a pizza oven. The bread is then brushed with garlic butter before serving. His second visit was to Joe's Stone Crabs where he sampled their famed stone crab claws and their family-recipe key lime pie. Opened in 1913, Joe's catches the stone crabs between October 15 and Mary 15 and removes one claw. They then throw the crab back into the ocean where the claw regenerate. The claws are harvested, boiled, chilled and cracked with a mallet. The claws are dipped in Joe's special mustard sauce that is infused with Worcestershire sauce and cream. Third, Adam visited La Moon Restaurant, a Colombian restaurant that is famous for the "Super Moon Perro", a large beef hot dog topped with 11 ingredients (including Colombian chorizo, tocineta (a type of bacon), steamed mozzarella cheese, French-fried potato sticks, 5 different sauces - garlic mayonaisse, mayo based pink sauce, ketchup, homemade mustard, pineapple sauce - and a quail egg), a dish Adam enjoyed. At the hotel, there were also some Fan v. Fan competitions; the first involved two 2-person teams (one dressed in blue and dubbed "Team Indianapolis" and the other wearing black, called "Team New Orleans") each taking on The Burger & Beer Joint's "Mother Burger" (which weighs in at over 10 pounds) to see who could eat more in 15 minutes (judges, including Dhani Jones, would determine the winner by weighing the burgers after the 15 minutes), and the challenge was won by Team Indianapolis, who received free Man v. Food T-shirts. The second competition involved two teams of three NFL stars (on one team, Miami's own Jake Grove and Jake Long, and Washington's Clinton Portis, and on the other, Cincinnati's Dhani Jones and Keith Rivers, and the New York Giants' Danny Clark) going head-to-head in a spicy grilled wings challenge from the Sports Grill; each team member had 3 wings (for a total of 9 per team) and the first team to finish all their wings without drinking any milk would be declared the winner; the team of Jones, Rivers and Clark won the competition. For the live challenge itself, Adam took on Don Shula's 48 oz. Steak Challenge, where he had to eat a 3-pound porterhouse steak from Shula's Steak House to join Don Shula's "48 oz. Club". While normal challengers have no time limit, Adam - because he was doing this on live television - had to finish this steak in under 20 minutes. A fourth clip aired before the challenge, which showed Adam at Shula's Steak House, where he watched the preparation of the steaks and sampled their filet mignon. Before Adam's attempt at the porterhouse challenge, over 80,000 people tried this challenge, but roughly half of them failed it. Major_League_Eating's Richard & George Shea served as commentators during the challenge. Adam managed to finish the entire steak with 3 minutes and 23 seconds left on the clock and won the challenge. The "press conference" at the end of the episode also featured an appearance by New Orleans Saints defensive end Bobby McCray. Post-episode update: Yelp reviewers report that La Moon Restaurant is permanently closed. Post-episode update: Burger & Beer Joint and Sports Grill ceased to operate out of the Alexander Hotel after the episode aired. Yelp reviewers report that Burger & Beer Joint's three other locations are permanently closed. Sports Grill continues to operate multiple other locations around the Miami area.
