= John Fina =

American football player (born 1969)

No. 70, 74
- Position: Offensive tackle

Personal information
- Born: March 11, 1969 (age 57); Rochester, New York, U.S.
- Listed height: 6 ft 5 in (1.96 m)
- Listed weight: 300 lb (136 kg)

Career information
- High school: Salpointe Catholic (AZ)
- College: Arizona
- NFL draft: 1992: 1st round, 27th overall pick

Career history
- Buffalo Bills (1992–2001); Arizona Cardinals (2002)

Awards and highlights
- Second-team All-Pac-10 (1991)

Career NFL statistics
- Games played: 155
- Games started: 131
- Fumble recoveries: 4
- Stats at Pro Football Reference

John Joseph Fina (born March 11, 1969) is an American former professional football player who was an offensive tackle for 11 years in the National Football League (NFL), 10 of those with the Buffalo Bills, and a one-year stint with the Arizona Cardinals. Fina attended Salpointe Catholic High School where he was first-team All-State his senior year, and is one of the several players in school history to have their jersey retired. Fina attended the University of Arizona where he was a brother of Sigma Phi Epsilon. He was selected by the Buffalo Bills in the first round, 27th overall, in the 1992 NFL draft. He played in two Super Bowls, XXVII and XXVIII, however the Bills lost both of them to the Dallas Cowboys. He now resides in Tucson, Arizona.

On April 6, 2010, Fina appeared on the Travel Channel's show Food Wars as one of the guest judges. The food war was over the Sonoran hot dog and was between "BK's Carne Asada & Hot Dogs" and "El Güero Canelo". Both restaurants are located in Tucson, Arizona. BK's won the food war by a score of 4–1 with Fina voting for BK's hot dog.

Fina has multiple children and resides in Tucson, Arizona with his family.
