= Food Wars (American TV series) =

- Genre: Food reality
- Presented by: Camille Ford
- Country of origin: United States
- Original language: English
- No. of seasons: 1
- No. of episodes: 22

Production
- Executive producer: Matt Sharp
- Producer: Scott Miller
- Cinematography: Scott Sans
- Editor: Liam Lawyer
- Camera setup: Multi-camera
- Production company: Sharp Entertainment

Original release
- Network: Travel Channel
- Release: March 9 – November 17, 2010

Food Wars is a weekly Travel Channel series hosted by Camille Ford that debuted on Tuesday, March 9, 2010. The show featured restaurant rivalries in cities around the United States, with loyal fans cheering for one of two restaurants that serve one of the city's signature dishes. A blind taste test with five tasters was conducted at the end of each show to decide which restaurant's version of the dish was better.

The show aired 1 season from March to November 2010. It was cancelled and not picked up for any further seasons.

== Format ==
In each episode, Food Wars travels to a particular U.S. city and finds two restaurants who are top-rated rivals serving the same dish, one symbolic of the featured city (e.g., Buffalo wings in Buffalo, New York). Ford visits both restaurants, tries the dish in question and talks with owners and fans. The show presents a history of each restaurant and origins of the rivalry.

At the end of each episode, a taste test is conducted with the judging panel. Each judge tastes a sample of each dish and votes for his or her favorite. The restaurant that receives more votes is declared the winner of that food war. At the beginning of the series, the panel consisted of two "super fans" - one of each restaurant's most loyal customers and fans - and three impartial judges consisting of local personalities and/or critics. In this format, the judging was done via a blind taste test, where the identity of each sample was not revealed until after the judging. Beginning with the fourteenth episode the taste test format changed. The superfans were dropped and host Ford joined the taste test panel with two other locals. The panel is no longer blindfolded; they know whose dish they are tasting and can ask the owner questions.

== Episodes ==
Food Wars debuted on March 9, 2010, with two back-to-back episodes that premiered at 10:00 and 10:30 PM EST, featuring buffalo-wing restaurants in Buffalo, New York and Italian-beef restaurants in Chicago. Further episodes aired on Wednesday nights at 10:00 PM EST.

Episode	Ep. #	Original Air Date	Rivalry	Winner
"Buffalo, NY Wing War"	01	March 9, 2010	Anchor Bar vs. Duff's	Duff's
Food Wars traveled to Buffalo, New York to pit Anchor Bar against cross-town rival Duff's to decide which serves the city's best Buffalo wings. The show was filmed in late December 2009.
"Chicago, IL Italian Beef War"	02	March 9, 2010	Al's #1 Italian Beef vs. Mr. Beef	Mr. Beef
Food Wars traveled to Chicago to settle a rivalry between two Italian-beef sandwich restaurants: Al's #1 Italian Beef and Mr. Beef. In a lopsided victory, Mr. Beef soundly defeated Al's 4–1.
"Pittsburg, KS Fried Chicken War"	03	March 16, 2010	Chicken Annie's vs. Chicken Mary's	Chicken Mary's
Food Wars' visit to Pittsburg, Kansas pitted fried-chicken rivals Chicken Annie's and Chicken Mary's against each other. The episode was filmed January 15–17, 2010.
"Lockhart, TX BBQ War"	04	March 23, 2010	Kreuz Market vs. Smitty's Market	Kreuz Market
In Lockhart, Texas, Food Wars featured the barbecue rivalry between Kreuz Market and Smitty's Market, which resulted from a family feud between brother and sister. Unlike other episodes which taste-test a single food item, this week's challenge featured both beef brisket and smoked sausage from each restaurant, which according to one judge's commentary caused voting confusion.
"Minneapolis, MN Jucy Lucy War"	05	March 30, 2010	Matt's vs. The 5-8 Club	Matt's
Two Minneapolis favorites battled it out in this episode. Each restaurant claims to have invented the city's signature Jucy Lucy (or Juicy Lucy), a hamburger that boasts melted cheese cooked inside the meat patty. This installment was filmed February 8–10, 2010.
"Tucson, AZ Sonoran Dog War"	06	April 6, 2010	BK vs. El Güero Canelo	BK
Food Wars' excursion into Tucson, Arizona featured two purveyors of the Sonoran hot dog, a hot dog wrapped in bacon and topped with pinto beans, chopped tomatoes, both fresh and grilled onions, mustard, jalapeño sauce and mayonnaise. This episode was filmed January 28–30, 2010 and in a Food Wars first, both opposing superfans (who happen to be brothers) voted for the same competitor, BK's Sonoran dog.
"Washington, D.C. Jumbo Pizza Slice War"	07	April 13, 2010	Pizza Mart vs Jumbo Slice	Pizza Mart
This episode featured a sibling rivalry between two owners of rival pizzerias in Washington's Adams Morgan neighborhood. A panel of judges including celebrity chef Carla Hall crowned Pizza Mart the winner in a 3–2 vote. This episode was filmed February 12–14, 2010.
"New York, NY Pastrami Sandwich War"	08	April 20, 2010	Katz's Deli vs Second Avenue Deli	Katz's Deli
"Los Angeles, CA Gourmet Burger Truck War"	09	August 18, 2010	Baby's Badass Burgers vs Grill 'Em All	Baby's Badass Burgers
"Detroit, MI Coney Island Hot Dog War"	10	August 25, 2010	American Coney Island vs Lafayette Coney Island	American Coney Island
"Pueblo, CO Slopper War"	11	September 1, 2010	Gray's Coors Tavern vs Sunset Inn	Sunset Inn
"Kansas City, MO BBQ Ribs War"	12	September 8, 2010	Arthur Bryant's vs Gates Bar-B-Q	Arthur Bryant's
"New Orleans, LA Po'Boy Sandwich War"	13	September 15, 2010	Domilise's Restaurant vs Parkway Bakery & Tavern	Domilise's
"Philadelphia, PA Philly Cheesesteak War"	14	September 22, 2010	Pat's vs Tony Luke's	Pat's King of Steaks
"Chicago, IL Deep Dish Pizza War"	15	September 29, 2010	Pizzeria Uno vs Lou Malnati's	Lou Malnati's
"Newark, NJ Italian Hot Dog War"	16	October 6, 2010	Jimmy Buff's vs. Charlie's "Famous" Italian Hot Dog	Charlie's
"Milwaukee, WI Cheeseburger War"	17	October 13, 2010	Sobelman's vs. AJ Bomber's	AJ Bomber's
"Omaha, NE Steak War"	18	October 20, 2010	Caniglia's Venice Inn vs. Piccolo Pete's Restaurant	Caniglia's
"Key West, FL Key Lime Pie War"	19	October 27, 2010	Blue Heaven vs. Blond Giraffe	Blond Giraffe
"Maine Lobster Roll War"	20	November 3, 2010	Alisson's Restaurant vs. The Clam Shack	The Clam Shack
"Reno, NV Awful-Awful Burger War"	21	November 10, 2010	John Ascuaga's Nugget vs. The Little Nugget	The Little Nugget
"New York City Pizza War"	22	November 17, 2010	John's of Bleecker Street vs. Grimaldi's Pizzeria	Grimaldi's Pizzeria
