= Tony Luke Jr. =

American screenwriter

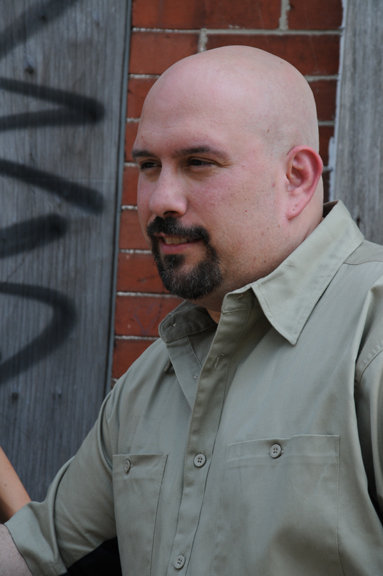
- Born: March 12, 1962 (age 63); Philadelphia, PA
- Known for: Tony Luke's

Anthony Lucidonio Jr. (born March 12, 1962) better known as Tony Luke Jr. is an American restaurateur, musician, songwriter actor, and media host who founded the cheesesteak franchise Tony Luke's.

== Career ==
Luke married at age 18 after high school. He went to work with his father, Tony Lucidonio in food trucks and other odd jobs to support his growing family. In the early 1990s Luke, his brother, Nicky, and their father bought a property near the expressway in South Philadelphia. To compete with other local businesses, the original Tony Luke's stand offered a more diversified menu, offering hoagies and other fare, along with cheesesteaks. Luke Jr. soon took over the store's marketing.

Eventually, the business grew to include several locations in the Philadelphia area and a line of frozen sandwiches. Through a partnership with Rastelli Foods Group, the business now has several franchised locations in Bahrain.

Luke's restaurant franchise, Tony Luke's, has expanded from its original South Philadelphia location to Citizens Bank Park, Atlantic City, The Wildwoods, and the Kingdom of Bahrain. Luke's frozen line "Tony Luke's Pronto" is available nationally. Luke and his restaurants have earned numerous awards and recognition from both local and national publications, as well being featured in episodes of Throwdown! with Bobby Flay, Dinner: Impossible, Man v. Food and Food Wars.

Luke opened a location in Bahrain in 2010 and plans on opening 60 more in the Middle East and North Africa.

=== Sports broadcasting ===
He was the host of "Tony Luke's Eaglemania" which aired Saturday nights on Philadelphia's ABC affiliate WPVI-TV for a portion of the Eagles' 2010 season.

== Personal life ==
Luke was born in South Philadelphia. He attended Philadelphia High School for the Creative and Performing Arts.

Using methamphetamine and other drugs as a teenager, he now uses that experience and the fighting and hustling of his youth to tell kids that difficulties can be overcome.

He was a state kickboxing champion in 1982–83.

In 2011, after 31 years of marriage, Luke and his wife divorced. He has three sons, who all have worked for him. In 2017, Luke's eldest son, Anthony James Lucidonio III, died in his home from an accidental opioid overdose at the age of 35.

== Filmography ==
=== Acting ===
- The Jamie Kennedy Experiment (2003) as Anthony Martinelli
- Hack (2003) – episode "Dial 'O' for Murder" as vendor
- Mafioso: The Father, the Son (2004) as Paulie Hammer
- 10th & Wolf (2006) as Rocco
- Invincible (2006) as cape-clad fan
- Sight (2008) as Paul
- The Nail: The Story of Joey Nardone (2009) as Joey Nardone
- The Mighty Macs (2010) as Salvatore Galentino

=== As self ===
- Tony Luke's Eaglemania (2010)
- Frankenfood (SpikeTV) (2014) Co-host and judge
- Food Mashups With Tony Luke Jr. (2015) web series, host

=== As producer ===
- The Nail: The Story of Joey Nardone (2009)
