= Sightings (disambiguation) =

Sightings are the visual detection of new things.

Sightings may also refer to:

- Sightings (TV series), an American television series
- Sightings (band), an American noise rock music group

== See also ==
- Sight (disambiguation)
