= Diane Kochilas =

Greek American cookbook author and chef

Diane Kochilas (Greek: Κόχυλας, Kóchylas; born May 17, 1960) is a Greek American cookbook author, celebrity chef, and cooking school owner. She has appeared on numerous American television programs, including Throwdown! with Bobby Flay, Bizarre Foods with Andrew Zimmern, The Today Show, PBS News Hour, and Martha Stewart. In Greece and Cyprus, Kochilas hosted the TV cooking show Τι Θα Φάμε Σήμερα Μαμά; (What Are We Going to Eat Today, Mom?) on Alpha Channel and Sigma in Cyprus. She runs the Glorious Greek Kitchen Cooking School on the Blue-Zone Greek Island of Ikaria.

Kochilas received the IACP Jane Grigson Award for Excellence in Research for her book "The Glorious Foods of Greece" in 2002. In, 2015, her book "Ikaria: Lessons of Food, Life & Longevity from the Greek Island Where People Forget to Die" won best cookbook in the IACP International Category, a Books for a Better Life Award, and was listed for an Art of Eating Award.

== Early life ==
Kochilas was born in New York to a native Greek father, Thomas Kochilas, and a Greek-Italian-American mother, Zoe Picos. She was raised in Jackson Heights, Queens. Kochilas attended Greek parochial elementary schools and New York City public high school. She attended New York University where she graduated with a B.A. in Journalism in 1981.

Kochilas' father, a Greek immigrant from the island of Ikaria, was a professional chef and an early influence before dying in 1970, when Kochilas was 10. At age 12, Kochilas visited Greece and her father's native village of Christos, Raches for the first time, where she developed her interest in food and cooking.

== Career ==
As consulting chef, Kochilas has helped open many Greek restaurants in North America, including Volos in Toronto, Canada, Axia in Bergen County, New Jersey, and Avli in Winnetka, Illinois. From 2004 to 2013, she was consulting chef at Pylos Restaurant in New York City, which was awarded Michelin mention during her tenure there. From January 2015 to December, 2016, she was collaborating chef at Molyvos in New York City. She is currently consulting chef at Committee, a meze-concept restaurant in Boston, Massachusetts. Kochilas has also consulted for Harvard University Dining Services, where she helped establish a roster of healthy menu options for student and retail dining. She works regularly with University of Massachusetts Amherst, designing Greek dishes for the campus' student dining menu.

In Greece, Kochilas was the host of "What Are We Going to Eat today, Mom" (In Greek) and was a columnist and restaurant critic for 20 years at the country's daily paper, "Ta Nea". Every summer, Kochilas and her husband, Vasilis Stenos, run the Glorious Greek Cooking School on the island of Ikaria.

== Print journalism ==
Kochilas has been a frequent contributor to many American and international publications, including "The Washington Post", "The Huffington Post", "Saveur Magazine", "The New York Times", "The Los Angeles Times", "Gourmet", Food & Wine", and "EatingWell".

From May, 1993, to December, 2013, Kochilas was the weekly food columnist for Greece's daily newspaper, "Ta Nea," covering cuisine, gastronomy, cooking, food history, and restaurants.

Kochilas was the founding editor of the "GreekGourmeTraveler," a magazine published by HEPO.

== Television ==
Kochilas has been featured on many American and Greek television shows, including:

- Martha Stewart Living "Greek Easter" (April 7, 2001)
- Anderson Cooper 360° on CNN (April, 2009)
- PBS NewsHour "Greek Food and the Greek Economy" (August, 2010)
- Throwdown! with Bobby Flay – Moussaka on the Food Network (February 2, 2011)
- Bizarre Foods with Andrew Zimmern – Greece on the Travel Channel (February, 2011)
- Fox News at 5 (December 27, 2012)
- The Today Show on NBC (January 26, 2012 and May 12, 2015)

Since 2012, Kochilas has hosted "Ti tha Fame Simera, Mama," (in Greek) a Greek cooking show

She also hosts a show called My Greek Table with Diane Kochilas on PBS and Create which is produced by Maryland Public Television.

== Books ==
Kochilas has authored 18 books on Greek and Mediterranean cuisine, including:

- The Food and Wine of Greece (St. Martin's, 1990) – ISBN 978-0-3120-5088-7
- The Greek Vegetarian: More Than 100 Recipes Inspired by the Traditional Dishes and Flavors of Greece (Macmillan, March 15, 1999) – ISBN 978-0-3122-0076-3
- The Glorious Foods of Greece: Traditional Recipes from the Islands, Cities, and Villages (HarperCollins, April 1, 2001) – ISBN 978-0-6881-5457-8
- Meze: Small Plates to Savor and Share from the Mediterranean Table (HarperCollins, June 3, 2003) – ISBN 978-0-6881-7511-5
- Against the Grain: 150 Good Carb Mediterranean Recipes (HarperCollins, February 24, 2009) – ISBN 978-0-0607-2679-9
- Mediterranean Grilling: More Than 100 Recipes from Across the Mediterranean (HarperCollins, May 29, 2007) – ISBN 978-0-0605-5639-6
- The Country Cooking of Greece (Chronicle Books, September 19, 2012) – ISBN 978-0-8118-6453-4
- Ikaria: Lessons on Food, Life, and Longevity from the Greek Island Where People Forget to Die (Rodale, October 14, 2014) – ISBN 978-1-6233-6296-6

== Personal life ==
Kochilas married Vasilis Stenos in 1984. Together they have two children. They divide their time between New York City, Athens, and Ikaria.
