= Sight (disambiguation) =

Sight is visual perception.

Sight or Sights may also refer to:

- An object of sightseeing, a point of interest
- Sight (device), used to assist aim by guiding the eye
  - Sighting in, adjusting firearms sights
- Sight, an angular measurement in celestial navigation
- Sight (Keller Williams video), a 2005 concert DVD by Keller Williams
- The Sight (film), a 2000 American horror television film
- "The Sight", a short story by Brian Moore
- The Sight, a 1985 film based on the short story by Brian Moore
- Sight (2008 film), a 2008 film
- Sight (2023 film), a film starring Greg Kinnear
- The Sight (Hunter novel), 2007 novel in the Warriors: Power of Three series by Erin Hunter
- The Sight (Clement-Davies novel), a 2002 book about wolves by David Clement-Davies
- "The sight", or extrasensory perception
- The Sights, a band
- "Sights", a song by London Grammar from the album If You Wait
- Sight, a 2018 novel by Jessie Greengrass
