= Tony Luke's =

Cheesesteak restaurant in Philadelphia

Tony Luke's Worldwide
- Trade name: Tony Luke's
- Company type: Private
- Industry: Restaurants
- Genre: Fast casual
- Founded: February 3, 1992; 34 years ago
- Founder: Tony Lucidonio; Tony Luke Jr. Nicky Lucidonio
- Headquarters: 39 East Oregon Avenue; Philadelphia, Pennsylvania, United States
- Number of locations: 16 (2021)
- Area served: Pennsylvania; New Jersey; Washington, DC; Maryland; Texas; Bahrain; Rio (Hotel and casino)
- Products: Cheesesteaks, Italian roast pork, and other sandwiches
- Owner: Lucidonio family
- Website: TonyLukes.com

Tony Luke's is an American-based cheesesteak restaurant that was founded in 1992 by Tony Lucidonio and his sons, Tony Luke Jr. and Nicky Lucidonio at its original location at 39 East Oregon Avenue in South Philadelphia. The franchise has since expanded, with 16 locations in Pennsylvania and New Jersey, one location each in Washington, D.C., Maryland and Texas as well as one in Bahrain.

== History ==
In the early 1990s Luke Jr., his father and his brother, Nicky, bought a property near the expressway in South Philadelphia. The restaurant opened on February 3, 1992. The restaurant did not initially serve cheesesteaks until six months after opening due to popular demand. To avoid competition with other local businesses, the original Tony Luke's stand offered a more diversified menu, offering hoagies and other fare, along with cheesesteaks. Luke Jr. soon took over the store's marketing.

Eventually, the business grew to include several locations in the Philadelphia area and a line of frozen sandwiches. Through a partnership with Rastelli Foods Group, the business now has several franchised locations in Bahrain. On January 21, 2019, the restaurant announced that they will be opening 7 locations in New York City. The first location opened on April 3, 2019, in Brooklyn, New York on Flatbush Avenue.

In July 2020, the owner Anthony Lucidonio Sr. and his son Nicholas were indicted on federal tax fraud charges. They are accused of failing to report over $8 million of income from 2006 to 2016. They are also accused of paying employees in cash to avoid payroll taxes. The Lucidonios dispute the criminal charges.

In 2022, the original Tony Luke's store underwent a name change due to a split among family members after a dispute that occurred in 2015. It is not affiliated with the Tony Luke's brand or franchise company which still operate several stores around the country.

== Business ventures ==
In 2008 Tony Luke expanded his franchise to frozen cheesesteaks and pork products known as Tony Luke's Pronto.

== In mass media ==
Tony Luke was selected as Bobby Flay's adversary for an episode of the cooking show Throwdown! with Bobby Flay, with Luke winning the cheesesteak battle.

Tony Luke's was featured on the Travel Channel's Man v. Food with Adam Richman attempting the "Ultimate Cheesesteak Challenge", which consisted of 42 oz. of beef, 18 oz. of cheese, and 8 oz. of fried onions on a 20-inch hoagie roll. Richman chose American cheese for his cheesesteak while Luke, who also took on the challenge, opted for the more traditional Cheez Whiz on his. Richman succeeded in the challenge while Luke failed.

The restaurant was also featured on Food Wars (hosted by Camille Ford), going head-to-head with Pat's King of Steaks in a battle for best cheesesteak in Philadelphia, with Pat's beating out Tony Luke's in the competition.

Tony Luke played host to former World's Strongest Man Eddie Hall on his visit to Philadelphia filming his 2019 series Eddie Eats America for UKTV. Luke said Eddie was the fastest eater of the "Ultimate Cheesesteak Challenge".

== See also ==
- List of submarine sandwich restaurants
