= Brennan & Carr =

Roast beef sandwich shop in Brooklyn, New York

- Interactive map of Brennan & Carr

Restaurant information
- Established: 1938
- Owner: Eddie Sullivan
- Food type: Roast Beef Sandwiches
- Location: 3432 Nostrand Avenue, Brooklyn, Kings, New York, 11229
- Coordinates: 40°36′1″N 73°56′31.5″W

Brennan & Carr is a roast beef sandwich shop in Sheepshead Bay, Brooklyn open since 1938. It appeared on Man v. Food (season 2).

Its Roast Beef sandwich has been named one of the "23 Iconic Dishes to Try in New York" and is the city's answer to "LA's fabled French dipped sandwiches."

One of the signatures of Brennan & Carr is its beef broth, which consists of the leftover drippings from the oven-roasted beef, poured into a heated vat, and is then used as part of the sandwich-making process.

Regular customers know of three variations of using broth with their ordered sandwich: The "Dingle-Dangle", which is just the beef of the sandwich dipped into the broth, leaving the roll dry; the "Double Dip", where the entire sandwich is dipped into the broth; and the "K.F.J.", or "Knife and Fork Job", where an entire ladleful of broth is poured onto the entire sandwich, making the result so messy, customers have to use a knife and fork to eat it.
