= The Nail: The Story of Joey Nardone =

- Film poster
- Directed by: James Quattrochi
- Written by: Tony Luke Jr. Jason Noto
- Produced by: Lynn Eastman-Rossi; James Quattrochi; Leo Rossi; Flo Speakman
- Starring: Tony Luke Jr. Tony Danza; William Forsythe; Leo Rossi
- Cinematography: Jeff Baustert
- Edited by: David A. Davidson
- Music by: Jerry Deaton
- Production company: LLC
- Release date: August 3, 2009
- Running time: 90 minutes
- Country: United States
- Language: English

The Nail: The Story of Joey Nardone is a 2009 drama film. The film was directed by James Quattrochi and stars Tony Luke Jr., Tony Danza and William Forsythe.

== Plot ==
After eight years in prison for manslaughter, former professional boxer Joey Nardone (Tony Luke Jr.) is trying to get his life back on track.
