= El Guero Canelo =

Coordinates: 32.1575°N 110.9772°W

- Interactive map of El Guero Canelo

Restaurant information
- Established: 1993; 33 years ago
- Owner: Daniel Contreras
- Manager: Gregorio Contreras
- Food type: Sonoran-style Mexican street food
- Dress code: casual
- Location: 5201 S.12th Ave., Tucson, Arizona, 85706, United States
- Other locations: 2480 N. Oracle Rd. 5802 E. 22nd St.
- Website: elguerocanelo.com

El Güero Canelo (lit. 'The Cinnamon Blonde') is a restaurant in Tucson, Arizona, United States. In 2018, it was named one of America's Classics by the James Beard Foundation.

== History ==
Daniel Contreras, a native of Sonora who was born in Magdalena, Mexico, opened the restaurant in 1993 when he was 33. The restaurant began as a food cart, which is the typical way Sonoran hot dogs are sold, but evolved into a restaurant.

The company out grew its original building on South 12th Avenue and has been replaced it by a larger building that was built next door in July 2026.

According to the Beard Foundation it is a "destination restaurant".

== Menu ==
The restaurant focuses on Sonoran hot dogs, a Tucson specialty that the Beard Foundation said "evinces the flow of culinary and cultural influences from the U.S. to Mexico and back (after) decades ago, elaborately dressed hot dogs began to appear as novelty imports on the streets of Hermosillo". Typical toppings are beans, jalapeno sauce, mayonnaise, mustard, onions, and tomatoes, and hot dogs are served with a grilled yellow pepper. The buns the restaurant serves are produced in Magdalena, Mexico.

The restaurant also serves staples of Mexican cuisine, but according to NPR it "made its name on what may be the ultimate example of cross-border pollination", the Sonoran hot dog.

== Recognition ==
In 2010, El Guero Canelo appeared on the Travel Channel show Food Wars, competing against rival BK Carne Asada and Hot Dogs in a blindfolded taste test. The show's panel selected BK as the winner, however. In 2018 the restaurant was named one of America's Classics by the James Beard Foundation. In 2021 Travel Magazine named them to their list of the country's ten best hot dogs. Jane and Michael Stern said "El Guero Canelo is to the Sonoran hot dog what Buffalo's Anchor Bar is to the chicken wing". NBC News in 2015 called Contreras "perhaps the most famous purveyor of Sonoran hot dogs in Tucson".
