= Cake Man Raven =

American baker and bakery owner

Raven Patrick De'Sean Dennis III (born 1967), better known by the alias Cake Man Raven, is an American baker and owner of the Cake Man Raven confectionery bakery formerly of Fort Greene, and now of New York, Harlem. DNAinfo.com called him "the foremost red velvet baker in America," and the New York Daily News wrote that he "turned Dixieland dessert red velvet cake into a Brooklyn thing."

== Early life and education ==
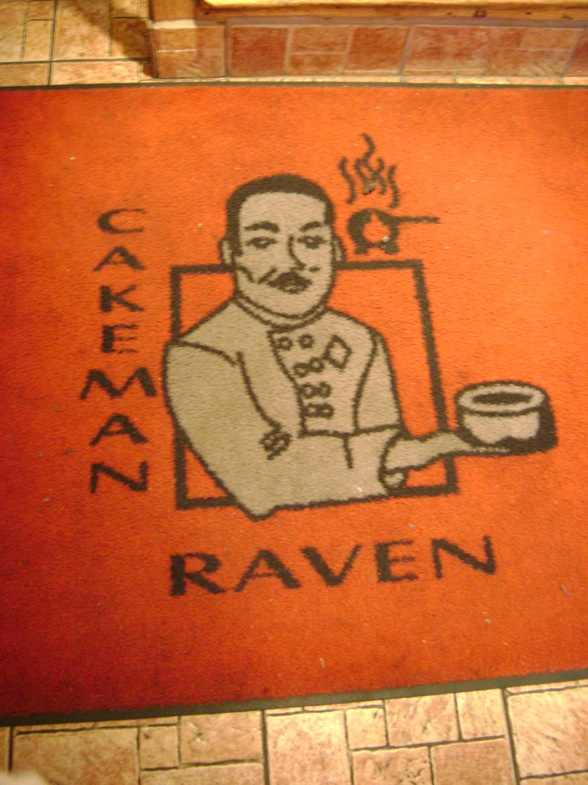
A carpet in the Cake Man Raven Confectionery featuring his logo

Born in Harlem, New York City, to Raven Dennis Jr. and Ruth Murrelle Dennis, he was inspired to start baking by his grandmother, Evelyn Nowlin Murrelle, with whom he lived in South Carolina in his youth. Dennis baked his first cake when he was nine, and sold his first cake when he was 13, when his school secretary bought two coconut pies for $2.50 each. He attended the Mount Pleasant High School, from which he graduated in 1985. Before he graduated, he participated in cake shows and competitions throughout South Carolina. He participated in Marketing & Distributive Education Clubs of Americas competitions in the area of entrepreneurship, and his business plan won the top state award in 1984 and 1985. He went to the national convention in Kansas City in 1984, received honors in the San Francisco during the 1985 finals and earned a scholarship. He received the nickname "Cake Man Raven" from an article in The Lee County Messenger.

Cake Man Raven attended Johnson & Wales University and Brown University, both in Providence, Rhode Island.

== Early career ==
He then returned to Harlem and started baking cakes, mostly for children's birthday parties. He started a cake business called "All Occasion Cakes" and planned to go to graduate school at Cornell University, but his plans changed with his grandmother died in December 1989. He returned to Johnson & Wales University to pursue a master's degree in education. He spent some time working at a stockbrokerage firm, but found he did not enjoy the work.

He has also carved ice sculptures, which has been featured in the World Trade Center's Windows of the World and during the 1986 and 1988 Grammy Award ceremonies.

== Career ==
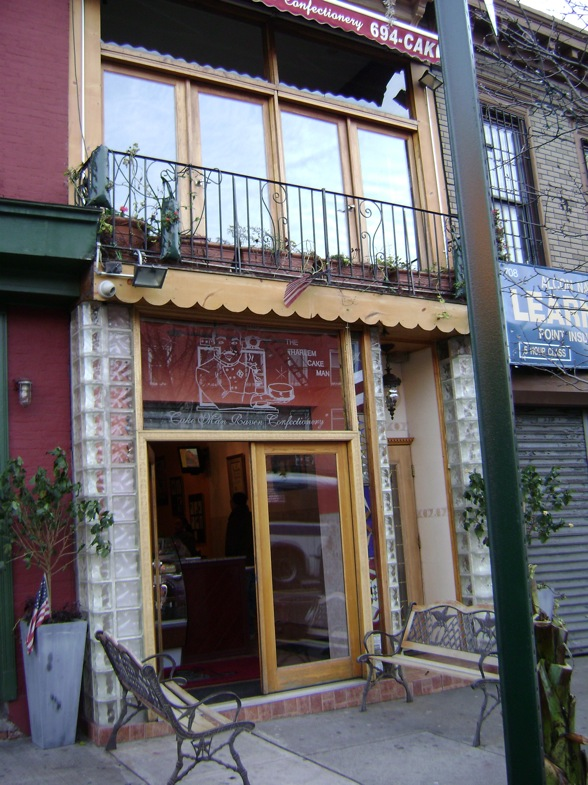
The Cake Man Raven Confectionery 12-year storefront in Brooklyn

He baked full-time in Harlem and then opened the Cake Man Raven Confectionery in 2000, at 708 Fulton Street in Brooklyn, where he sold his signature red velvet cake, among other cakes. Former employees now run the bakery in its place. His fans often refer to him as "Cake". Raven has served as a culinary artist to such celebrities as Bill Cosby, Jay-Z, Katie Couric, Michael Bloomberg, Whoopi Goldberg, Morgan Freeman, George Pataki, Patti LaBelle and Jesse Jackson. He has been featured on several national magazines and cooking shows, such as The View and Good Morning America. When Brooklyn Borough President Marty Markowitz was inaugurated in 2002, Raven baked a cake in the shape of Brooklyn Borough Hall for the inauguration party.

He has baked several other large cake representations, such as of the Columbia University Library and a giant wedding cake for the television reality series Bridezillas. In 2003, he baked a seven-foot-tall, 12-foot-long cake of the Brooklyn Bridge in honor of the structure's 120th anniversary. The cake required 20 people, five days of assembly and 22 hours of decorating. In 2003, for Mary J. Blige's birthday party, Raven baked a four-foot-wide, 26-inch-tall cake celebrating all of her decisions, including with edible approximations of a CD, several fashion symbols, a life-size baby symbolizing Blige's spiritual rebirth and other factors. Raven baked a cake for Al Sharpton modeled after a Bible; for Cab Calloway, he baked a cake shaped as a grand piano; and when Jam Master Jay died in 2002, he baked a cake in the shape of a large Adidas sneaker. In 2005, Dennis baked the world's tallest wedding cake, a sponge cake stood 15 feet high, was 16-by-16 feet, weighed 5,000 pounds, and was large enough to feed 30,000 people. The cake was unveiled to the public on ABC's Good Morning America. In 2008, Raven appeared on the Food Network series Throwdown! with Bobby Flay.

=== Rent hike and move ===
George Kaisotis, the owner of the building where the popular Fort Greene bakery was located, took Dennis to court in a rent dispute in 2012: Kaisotis wanted to raise the rent from $3,000 a month to $5,100. After a 12-year run, Dennis moved his store into his Cypress Hills baking facility and has been operating out of there. Former Cake Man Raven employees opened up another red velvet-cake-focused bakery in the same Fort Greene storefront in late 2013.
