= Anchor Bar =

Restaurant known for claiming to be the birthplace of the Buffalo wing

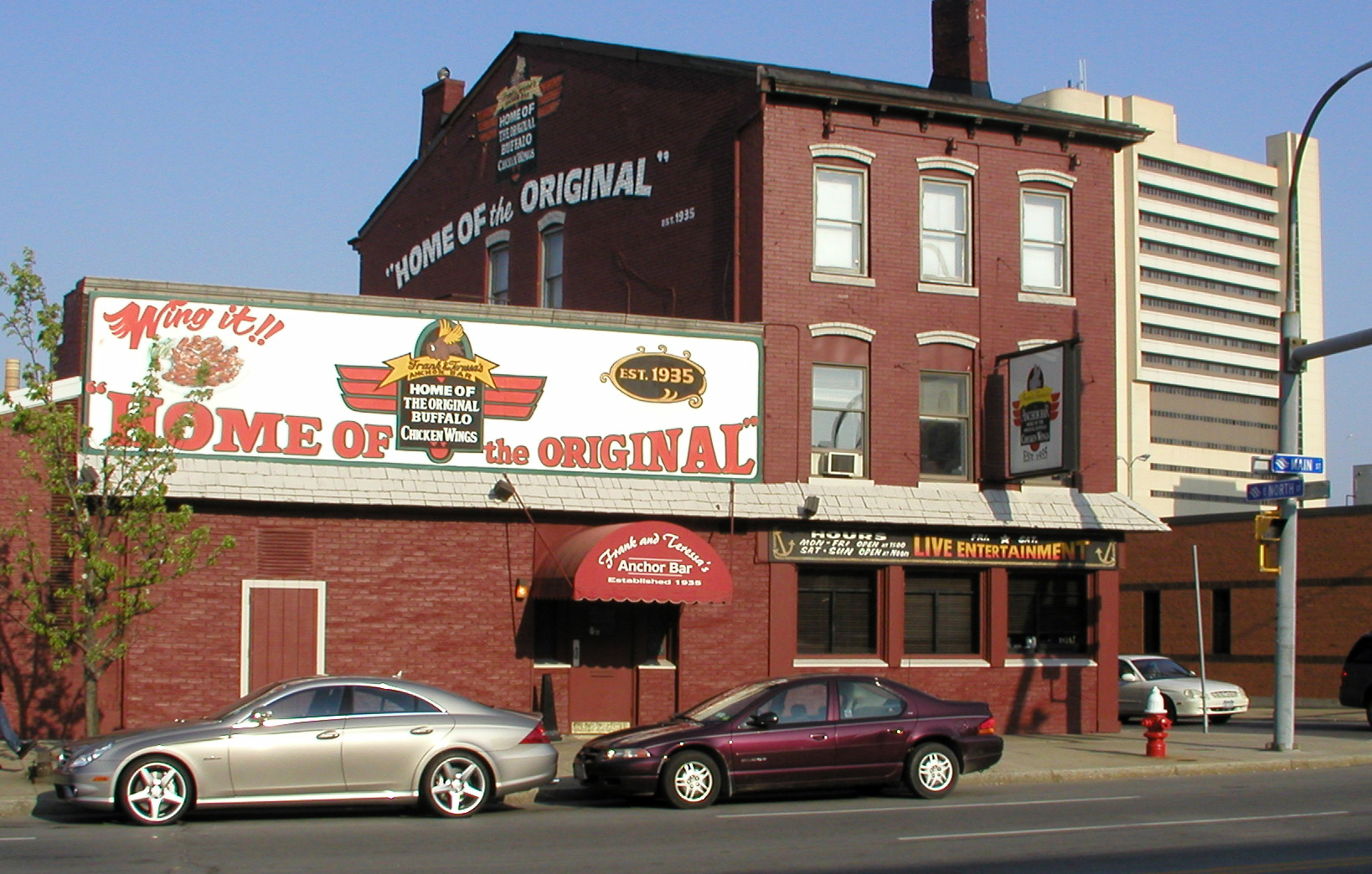
- The Anchor Bar in 2007
- Interactive map of Anchor Bar

Restaurant information
- Established: 1935; 91 years ago
- Food type: Italian; American
- Dress code: Casual
- Location: 1047 Main St., Buffalo, New York, 14209, United States
- Coordinates: 42°54′08.6″N 78°52′06.8″W
- Other information: Phone: (716) 884-4083
- Website: anchorbar.com

The Anchor Bar is a bar and restaurant in Buffalo, New York, located north of Downtown Buffalo at the intersection of Main and North Streets. The restaurant was initially established in 1935. The bar is most famous for claiming to be the birthplace of spicy chicken wings known outside the Buffalo area as Buffalo wings. Beginning in 2012, additional locations of the Anchor Bar began opening in the Greater Buffalo area as well other cities. As of 2026, there are 18 locations in operation.

== History ==
The Anchor Bar, on Main Street in Buffalo, New York, was established in 1935 by Frank and Teressa Bellissimo.

It became famous for trademarking the Buffalo-style chicken wing.

The Bellissimos' claim to the invention of the Buffalo wing has been disputed, with Buffalo restaurateur John Young also identified as an early seller of chicken wings in the city during the 1960s.

Frank Bellissimo died in October 1980 at the age of 84.

Teressa Bellissimo, who opened the Anchor Bar with her husband Frank, and is credited with inventing the Buffalo Wing, died in her apartment above the bar in November 1985. She was 84.

Dominic, the son of Frank and Teressa, who later owned the establishment and actively promoted the bar and its wings, died in March 1991 at the age of 68.

On November 20, 2018, Ivano Toscani, owner of the Anchor Bar, died from a long illness eight days before his 69th birthday. Toscani began working for the Bellissimos at the bar in the mid-1970s.

== Chicken wings ==
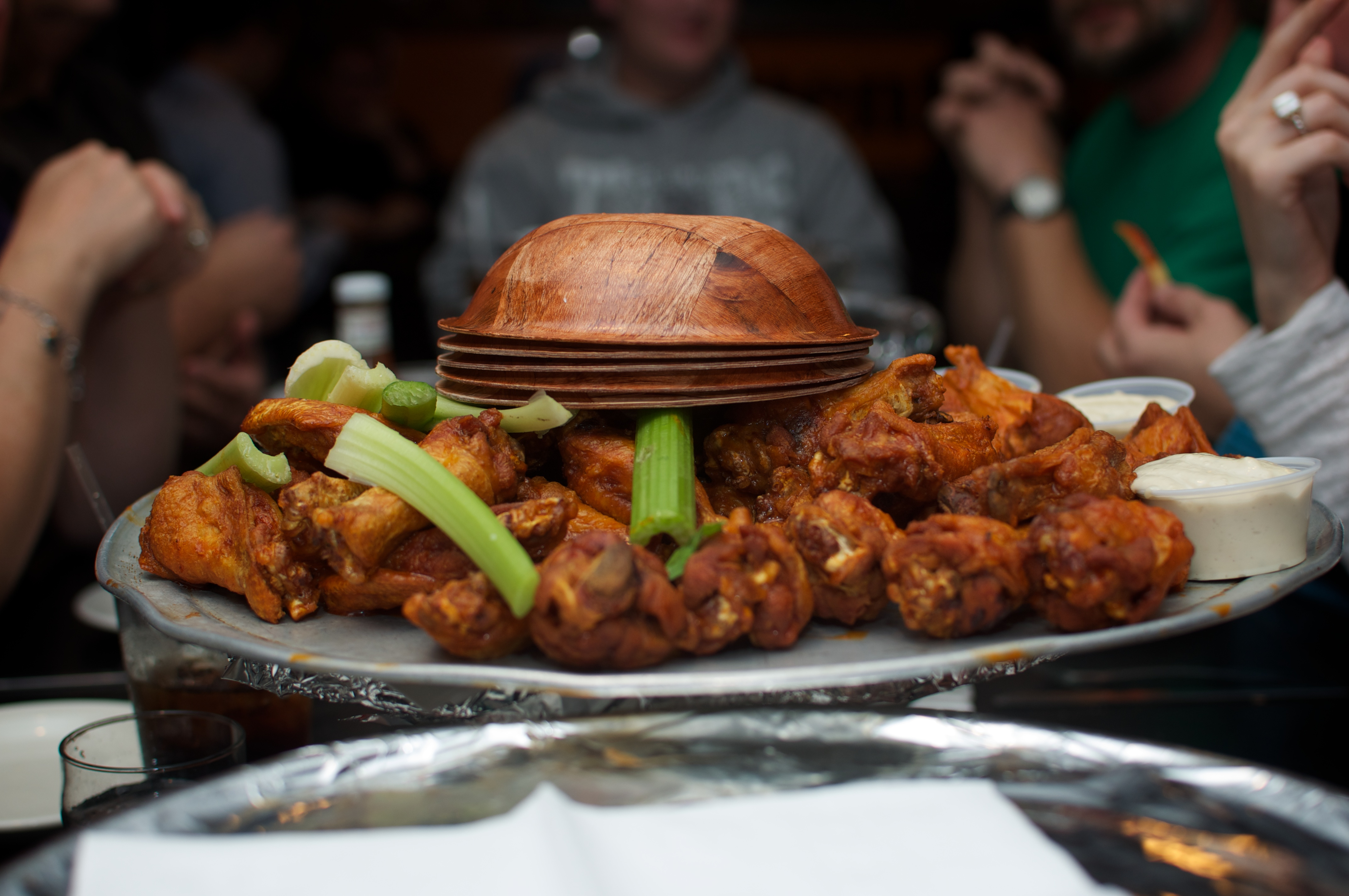
Buffalo wings and celery at the Anchor Bar

On March 4, 1964, Dominic Bellissimo was tending bar. Late that evening, a group of Bellissimo's friends arrived at the bar. He asked his mother, Teressa, to prepare something for his friends to eat. With little food left, Teressa took some chicken wings, which were normally used for soups or thrown out, deep-fried them and flavored them using a mixture of butter, cayenne pepper and other ingredients on them. She brought out some cut celery and blue cheese for dipping as hors d'oeuvres.

The wings were initially offered free of charge.

Authentic Buffalo Wings are never battered. They are not grilled, but only deep-fried and slightly crispy. The sauce is added after the wing has been cooked. “Wings,” as they are called in Buffalo (versus “Buffalo Wings) are traditionally served with chunky blue cheese dressing and celery (freshly cut carrots are often served, as well).

Today, Anchor Bar sauces are sold in the United States at Tops Friendly Markets, Wegmans and in Canada at Sobey's and Metro stores.

In 2007, Iron Chef and Food Network personality Bobby Flay appeared at the Anchor Bar for a Buffalo wing "throwdown" with the self-proclaimed "Wing King", Drew Cerza.

== Other locations ==
In the summer of 2012, it was announced that a second location would open in Hamilton, Ontario. It is located in the Jackson Square mall.

In 2013, a quick service version of The Anchor Bar opened at the Darien Lake amusement park about half an hour away from Buffalo. This location has a limited menu compared to the original, but still offers the original wing sauce both on wings and sold in bottles along with other menu choices.

On October 1, 2014, another Anchor Bar location opened on Transit Road outside of the Eastern Hills Mall.

On October 22, 2015, an Anchor Bar location opened in the Millcroft Shopping Plaza, located at Appleby Line and Upper Middle Street in Burlington, Ontario. However, this location has since rebranded as the "AB Sports Bar."

In September 2016 a third Ontario location opened in Toronto, Ontario located at Dixon and Martin Grove roads. (This location closed by mid-2020.)

In June 2018, a fourth Ontario location opened in Mississauga, Ontario on Hurontario Street. (This location closed approximately one year after opening.)

The Anchor Bar has a restaurant location in the Main Terminal at Buffalo Niagara International Airport.

There are three locations in Texas. The San Antonio location opened in July 2017. The Schertz location opened in Sep 2018. In late 2021 a third location opened in Round Rock.

In September 2018 the first Michigan location opened in the city of Rochester Hills. It closed in 2020. In May 2019, Anchor Bar opened a location in Frederick, Maryland. A location in Kennesaw, Georgia became the first location in the Southeast in June 2020. A short-lived location opened as the first one in California in January 2021 in Orange, but was closed in mid-2022. The first Illinois location opened in 2022 in Oswego. The first Arizona location opened October 29, 2025 in Tucson.

== In popular culture ==
- The Anchor Bar appears in a driving montage in The Simpsons episode "D'oh Canada" (Season 30, episode 21).
- The Anchor Bar appears in the movie Buffaloed.

== See also ==
- List of chicken restaurants
- List of James Beard America's Classics
