= Throwdown! with Bobby Flay =

- Genre: Reality television Cooking show
- Starring: Bobby Flay
- Country of origin: United States
- Original language: English
- No. of episodes: 92

Production
- Running time: 30 minutes (with commercials)

Original release
- Network: Food Network
- Release: July 13, 2006 – March 10, 2010

Throwdown! with Bobby Flay is a Food Network television program in which celebrity chef Bobby Flay challenges cooks renowned for a specific dish or type of cooking to a cook-off of their signature dish.

At the beginning of each show, Flay receives – via bicycle messenger – a package detailing the chef he is to compete against as well as the dish. Examples of opponents include a skilled chili maker or a famous wedding cake designer. After practicing and preparing the item in question, Flay shows up for a surprise competition (or "Throwdown"). During the competition, both chefs prepare their particular version of the dish, and both are then evaluated by local judges to determine a winner.

== Format ==
Each show includes a mini-biography about the chef who is to be challenged, shown before the challenge takes place. The content for the biography is actually collected as part of an elaborate ruse or setup, where the chef or cook is told that they are going to be featured on a fictitious Food Network show. As part of the show, the featured chef (and their associated restaurant, if any) hosts a small party, which is then unexpectedly "crashed" by Bobby Flay. Upon Flay's arrival, he reveals the true nature of the show, and the "Throwdown" is initiated.

In the Food Network's test kitchen, Flay and his two sous-chefs (Stephanie Banyas and Miriam Garron) experiment and prepare a particular dish, often opting for a variant of the dish.

When Flay makes his appearance at a rival's event, he is usually greeted with surprise and confusion, although there has been one occasion where the challenged chef figured out that Flay would be appearing for a throwdown and ended up challenging him. Flay's comment was that he "had been set up." However, the rival usually quickly gets over the initial shock and warms up to the challenge. After the dishes are prepared, the two chefs taste each other's creations and are usually quite complimentary towards one another. Finally, the dishes are evaluated by one or more connoisseurs or notable veterans in that field (via a blind taste test), with the winner then being announced.

Each episode ends with a challenge from Flay looking directly into the camera and saying, "All you chefs keep doing what you do, but ask yourself this..." Finished with the featured chef saying "Are you ready for a Throwdown?"

The format of the show does not edit or disguise Flay's lack of knowledge of technique regarding cooking for the challenge. He often makes use of New York City-area experts to teach him basic techniques. In other instances, he acknowledges the traditional approach to the dish but then explains how he will make it more modern or more his own style of cooking with various added ingredients.

Flay's record is 32 wins, 1 tie, and 68 losses. Flay has a winning record (5 wins and 4 losses) with cake challenges, winning throwdowns for cheesecake and cupcakes in season 2, coconut cake and red velvet cake in season 5, and German chocolate cake in season 6. Flay lost throwdowns for a wedding cake in season 1, Bûche de Noël in season 5, and carrot cake and pineapple Upside-down cake in season 8.

== Episodes ==
=== Season 1 ===
Episode	Show number	Food	Chef	Restaurant	Location	Winner
1	BT0101	Chowder	Benjamin Sargent	Hurricane Hopeful Surf Bar	Brooklyn, New York	Bobby Flay
2	BT0102	Wedding cake	Michelle Doll	Michelle Doll Cakes	Brooklyn, New York	Michelle Doll
3	BT0103	Chili	Cindy Reed Wilkins	Cin Chili & Company	Houston, Texas	Tie
4	BT0104	Jerk chicken	Angela Shelf Medearis		Austin, Texas	Angela Shelf Medearis
5	BT0105	Steak	Eric Dominijanni		Twentynine Palms, California	Eric Dominijanni
6	BT0106	Breakfast	Lynn Winter	Lynn's Paradise Cafe	Louisville, Kentucky	Lynn Winter
7	BT0107	Burgers	Susan Mello		Queens, New York	Bobby Flay
8	BT0108	Jambalaya	Emile Stieffel		New Orleans, Louisiana	Emile Stieffel
9	BT0109	Cocktails	Tobin Ellis		Las Vegas, Nevada	Bobby Flay
10	BT0110	Doughnuts	Mark Israel	Doughnut Plant	New York City, New York	Mark Israel
11	BT0111	Cheesesteak	Tony Luke, Jr.	Tony Luke's	Philadelphia, Pennsylvania	Tony Luke
12	BT0112	Ice cream	Jeff Sommers	Izzy's Ice Cream	Saint Paul, Minnesota	Jeff Sommers
13	BT0113	Fried chicken	Jasper Alexander	Hattie's Restaurant	Saratoga Springs, New York	Jasper Alexander
14	BT0114	Barbecue	Butch Lupinetti		Mount Laurel, New Jersey	Butch Lupinetti
15	BT0115	Pizza	Giorgio Giove	Brother's Pizzeria	Staten Island, New York	Giorgio Giove

=== Season 2 ===
Episode	Show number	Food	Chef	Restaurant	Location	Winner
1	BT0201	Chocolate	Fritz Knipschildt	Chocopologie / Knipschildt Chocolatier	Norwalk, Connecticut	Fritz Knipschildt
2	BT0202	Bulos Flavored Ice Cream	Keith Young		New York City, New York	Keith Young
3	BT0203	Meatloaf	Jack and Rocco Collucci	Collucci Brother's Diner	Hyannis, Massachusetts	Jack and Rocco Collucci
4	BT0204	Macaroni and cheese	Delilah Winder	Delilah's	Philadelphia, Pennsylvania	Bobby Flay
5	BT0205	Fish and chips	Mat Arnfield	A Salt and Battery	New York City, New York	Mat Arnfield
6	BT0206	Cheesecake	Alan Rosen	Junior's	Brooklyn, New York	Bobby Flay
7	BT0207	Cuban roast pork	Roberto Guerra			Roberto Guerra
8	BT0208	Spare ribs	Buz Grossberg	Buz and Ned's	Richmond, Virginia	Buz Grossberg
9	BT0209	Cupcakes	Terri Wahl	Auntie Em's Kitchen	Eagle Rock, California	Bobby Flay
10	BT0210	Hot dogs	Richard, Gloria, and Beverly Pink	Pink's Hot Dogs	Hollywood, California	Bobby Flay
11	BT0211	Buffalo wings	Drew Cerza	The Anchor Bar	Buffalo, New York	Drew Cerza
12	BT0212	Sticky buns	Joanne Chang	Flour Bakery	Boston, Massachusetts	Joanne Chang
13	BT0213	Hot browns	Joe and John Castro	Brown Hotel	Louisville, Kentucky	Joe and John Castro

=== Season 3 ===
Episode	Show number	Food	Chef	Restaurant	Location	Winner
1	BT0301	Crepes	Nessa Higgins & Andrea Day Boykin	Flip Happy Crepes	Austin, Texas	Nessa Higgins & Andrea Day Boykin
2	BT0302	Puffy tacos	Diana Barrios-Trevino	La Hacienda/Los Barrios	San Antonio, Texas	Diana Barrios-Trevino
3	BT0303	Jerk ribeye	Nigel Spence	Ripe Kitchen and Bar	Mount Vernon, New York	Nigel Spence
4	BT0304	Chicken fried steak (Note: Highlights aired on Paula's Party)	Paula Deen	Uncle Bubba's Oyster House	Savannah, Georgia	Paula Deen
5	BT0305	Pie	Janet LaPosta & Ally Taylor	Pie Moms	Rockland, Maine	Bobby Flay
6	BT0306	Crab cake	Mitch Weiss	The Lobster Dock	Boothbay Harbor, Maine	Bobby Flay
7	BT0307	Muffuletta	Mike and Jack Serio (Note: Jack Serio died soon after this episode aired. A remembrance graphic appeared at the end of the program.)	Serio's Deli	New Orleans, Louisiana	Mike and Jack Serio
8	BT0308	Blondies	Tom Finney and Mark Ballard	Sugardaddy's Sumptuous Sweeties	Columbus, Ohio	Tom Finney and Mark Ballard
9	BT0309	Meatballs	Mike Maroni	Maroni Cuisine	Northport, New York	Mike Maroni
10	BT0310	Ice cream sundae	Julia Reynolds	Ice Cream Man	Greenwich, New York	Bobby Flay
11	BT0311	Lasagna	Mark Bove	Bove's Café	Burlington, Vermont	Bobby Flay
12	BT0312	Turkey and dressing	Renee Ferguson		Geneva, Illinois	Bobby Flay
13	BT0313	Gingerbread	Johanna Rosson		Macomb, Illinois	Johanna Rosson

=== Season 4 ===
Episode	Show number	Food	Chef	Restaurant	Location	Winner
1	BT0401	Biscuits and jam	Carol Fay	Loveless Cafe	Nashville, Tennessee	Bobby Flay
2	BT0402	Ice pops	Irma and Norma Paz	Las Paletas	Nashville, Tennessee	Irma and Norma Paz
3	BT0403	Chocolate chip cookies	Pam Weekes and Connie McDonald	Levain Bakery	New York	Pam Weekes and Connie McDonald
4	BT0404	Eggplant parmesan	David Greco	Mike's Deli	Bronx, New York	David Greco
5	BT0405	Chicken and waffles	Melba Wilson	Melba's	Harlem, New York	Melba Wilson
6	BT0406	Pretzels	The Pretzel Boys	The Pretzel Boys	Philadelphia, Pennsylvania	Bobby Flay
7	BT0407	Arroz con pollo	Jorge Ayala	La Fonda Boricua	New York	Jorge Ayala
8	BT0408	Grilled cheese sandwich	The Pop Shop	The Pop Shop	Collingswood, New Jersey	Bobby Flay
9	BT0409	Dumplings	Sohui Kim	The Good Fork	Red Hook, New York	Sohui Kim
10	BT0410	Pulled pork	Lee Ann Whippen	Wood Chicks BBQ	Chesapeake, Virginia	Lee Ann Whippen
11	BT0411	Arepas	Maribel and Aristides Barrios	Caracas Arepas Bar	Manhattan, New York	Maribel and Aristides Barrios
12	BT0412 (Note: A special "Rematch on the Grill" episode featuring 3 former Throwdown contestants. Ellis showed up at the Throwdown itself to challenge Flay separately.)	Grilled pork tenderloin vegetable skewers grilled whole fish cocktails	Butch Lupinetti; Delilah Winder; Nigel Spence; Tobin Ellis		Miami, Florida	Bobby Flay

=== Season 5 ===
Episode	Show number	Food	Chef	Restaurant	Location	Winner
1	BT0501	Coconut cake	Robert Carter	Peninsula Grill	Charleston, South Carolina	Bobby Flay
2	BT0502	Moules frites	Teddy Folkman	Granville Moore	Washington, D.C.	Teddy Folkman
3	BT0503	Seafood gumbo	Poppy Tooker		New Orleans, Louisiana	Poppy Tooker
4	BT0504	Paella	Gerard Nebesky	Gerard's Paella	Occidental, California	Gerard Nebesky
5	BT0505	Chile relleno	Ramiro Arvizu and Jaime Martin del Campo	La Casita Mexicana	Los Angeles, California	Ramiro Arvizu and Jaime Martin del Campo
6	BT0507	Brown bag apple pie	Dan Scheel and John Bauer	The Elegant Farmer	Mukwonago, Wisconsin	Dan Scheel and John Bauer
7	BT0506	Red velvet cake	Raven Dennis	Cakeman Raven Confectionery	Brooklyn, New York	Bobby Flay
8	BT0513	Bûche de Noël	François Payard	Payard	New York	François Payard
9	BT0508H	Deep-dish pizza	Marc Malnati	Lou Malnati's Pizzeria	Chicago, Illinois	Marc Malnati
10	BT0509H	Falafel	Einat Admony	Taim Falafel and Smoothie	New York	Bobby Flay
11	BT0510H	Chocolate bread pudding	Jerome Chang and Chris Chen	Dessert Truck	New York	Jerome Chang and Chris Chen
12	BT0512H	Cioppino	Phil DiGirolamo	Phil's Fish Market	Moss Landing, California	Phil DiGirolamo
13	BT0511H	Sushi	Philip Yi	Sushi Central	Los Angeles, California	Philip Yi

=== Season 6 ===
Episode	Show number	Food	Chef	Restaurant	Location	Winner
1	BT0601H	Pad Thai	Nongkran Daks	Thai Basil	Chantilly, Virginia	Nongkran Daks
2	BT0602H	Ravioli	Robert Durso Sr. & Robert Durso II	Durso's Pasta & Ravioli Company	Flushing, New York	Bobby Flay
3	BT0603H	Chicken pot pie	Sandy Pollock & Crystal Cook	Casserole Queens	Austin, Texas	Bobby Flay
4	BT0604H	Blueberry pancakes	Neil Kleinberg and DeDe Lahman	Clinton St. Baking Company & Restaurant	New York	Bobby Flay
5	BT0605H	Chicken matzoh ball soup	Jeff Nathan	Abigael's	New York	Jeff Nathan
6	BT0606H	Shrimp and grits	Joe Barnett		Washington, Georgia	Joe Barnett
7	BT0607H	North Carolina ribs and baked beans	Ed Mitchell	The Pit	Raleigh, North Carolina	Ed Mitchell
8	BT0608	German chocolate cake	Aliyyah Smith	Make My Cake	Harlem, New York	Bobby Flay
9	BT0609H	Fried fish escovitch	Sheron Barnes	Mo Bay Restaurant	Harlem, New York	Sheron Barnes
10	BT0610H	Country Captain	Lee Bros		Charleston, South Carolina	Lee Brothers
11	BT0611H	Fish tacos	Cesar Gonzales	Mama Testa Taqueria	San Diego, California	Cesar Gonzales
12	BT0612H	Green chile burger	Bobby Olguin	Manny's Buckhorn Tavern	San Antonio, New Mexico	Bobby Olguin
13	BT0613H	Sloppy Joes	Andrew and John Schnipper	Schnipper's Quality Kitchen	New York	Bobby Flay

=== Season 7 ===
Episode	Show number	Food	Chef	Restaurant	Location	Winner
1	BT0701H	Fajita	Father Leo Patalinghug		Emmitsburg, Maryland	Father Leo Patalinghug
2	BT0702H	Barbecue chicken	Brad Turner		Fort Lee, Virginia	Bobby Flay
3	BT0703H	Lobster club sandwich	Lynn Archer	The Brass Compass Cafe	Rockland, Maine	Lynn Archer
4	BT0705H	Pumpkin pie	Michele Albano	Michele's Pies	Norwalk, Connecticut	Bobby Flay
5	BT0704H	Feast of the Seven Fishes	The Pellegrino Family	Rao's	Las Vegas, Nevada	The Pellegrino Family
6	BT0706H	Manhattan fish chowder	John Addis	Fish Tales	Brooklyn, New York	Bobby Flay
7	BT0707H	Liege Belgian waffles	Thomas DeGeest	Wafels & Dinges Truck	New York	Thomas DeGeest
8	BT0708H	Brownies	Shawna Lidsky & Katherine Hayward	Vermont Brownie Company	South Hero, Vermont	Shawna Lidsky & Katherine Hayward
9	BT0709H	Burritos	Victor & Miguel Escobedo	Papalote Mexican Grill	San Francisco, California	Victor & Miguel Escobedo
10	BT0710H	Omelets	Misty Young	Squeeze In	Truckee, California	Bobby Flay
11	BT0711H	Stuffed French toast	Omar Giner	La Isla Restaurant	Hoboken, New Jersey	Omar Giner
12	BT0712H	Cuban Sandwich	Nick Vazquez	Azucar Cuban Cuisine	Jersey City, New Jersey	Nick Vazquez

=== Season 8 ===
Episode	Show number	Food	Chef	Restaurant	Location	Winner
1	BT0801H	Hot dogs	Nick Suarez	Brooklyn's Cheesiest Dog	Brooklyn, New York	Nick Suarez
2	BT0802H	Quiche	Rodney Henry	Dangerously Delicious Pies	Baltimore, Maryland	Bobby Flay
3	BT0803H	Chicken Tikka Masala	Chef Marianna	Saffron	Hudson, New York	Bobby Flay
4	BT0804H	Pineapple upside-down cake	Marilyn and Sheila Brass	Cookbook authors	Cambridge, Massachusetts	Brass Sisters
5	BT0805H	Carrot cake	Vera Stewart	Very Vera	Augusta, Georgia	Vera Stewart
6	BT0806H	Huevos rancheros	Teresa and David Matias	Mosaic Cafe	Tucson, Arizona	Bobby Flay
7	BT0807H	Banana cream pie	Matt Lewis and Renato Poliafito	Baked Bakery	Brooklyn, New York	Bobby Flay
8	BT0808H	Chicken wings	Colette Burnett	Super Wings NY	Brooklyn, New York	Colette Burnett
9	BT0809H	Chicken-fried steak	Kent Rollins	Red River Ranch Chuckwagon Catering	Texas	Kent Rollins
10	BT0810H	Whoopie pies	Carol Ford and Karen Haase	Cranberry Island Kitchen	Portland, Maine	Carol Ford and Karen Haase
11	BTO811H	Moussaka	Diane Kochilas		New York	Bobby Flay
12	BT0812H	Lobster Mac and Cheese	Cal Hancock	Hancock Gourmet Lobster Company	Cundy's Harbor, Maine	Cal Hancock
