= Sight (2008 film) =

- DVD released by Lions Gate Entertainment
- Directed by: Adam Ahlbrandt
- Written by: Adam Ahlbrandt
- Produced by: Clayton Haske
- Cinematography: Adam Ahlbrandt
- Edited by: Adam Ahlbrandt
- Music by: Adam Ahlbrandt
- Production company: Index Films
- Distributed by: Lions Gate Entertainment
- Release date: May 20, 2008 (United States)
- Running time: 1:20:42
- Country: United States
- Language: English

Sight is a 2008 horror film written and directed by Adam Ahlbrandt.

== Plot ==
Jeffrey leads a quiet existence. Living in constant fear of being labeled a psychopath, Jeffrey constructs a complex world of denial. He is haunted by the spirits of the vengeful dead, which he can see while no one else can. After meeting Dana, a beautiful young woman who shares his "sight", Jeffery finds comfort in knowing someone shares his affliction. However, his comfort is short lived as Dana suddenly goes missing and Jeffrey is left alone to find the answers.

== Cast ==
- Clayton Haske as Jeffrey
- Allison Persaud as Dana
- Frank Traynor as Uncle Ron
- Tony Luke Jr. as Paul
- Philip Raymond as Jeffrey's Father
- David Hartman as Young Jeffrey
- Robert Reed Murphy as Detective Walters
- Donna Earl as Mrs. Dorris
- Godfrey Rayner as Wes
- David B. Johnson as Henry
- Roosevelt Darby Jr. as Mark
- Bowman Wright as Dillon
- Andrew Borthwick-Leslie as Doctor Bennet
- Cheryl Scungio as Doctor Bennice

== Reception ==
Bloody Disgusting gave Sight a 1½ out of 5, the website's primary criticisms of the film being the muddled plot, and the sound quality. A ½ was awarded by Steve Barton of Dread Central, who succinctly stated, "The only constructive thing I can say about this dark, dreary, time-consuming, black hole of a film is that it was less than an hour and a half long and had some okay sound design". DVD Talk's Justin Felix, who gave the film a 2½ out of 5, said, "Acting aside, Sight is ultimately a worthwhile low budget exercise in eerie mood and spectral scares, though I'm not sure it warrants repeat viewings". The film was deemed "slightly annoying" in a review for DVD Verdict written by David Johnson, who concluded his coverage of Sight with, "A well-acted horror film that relies too heavily on the jump scare and a twist ending that fails to wow, Sight probably isn't worth taking a look at".
