= The Clam Shack =

Restaurant in Maine

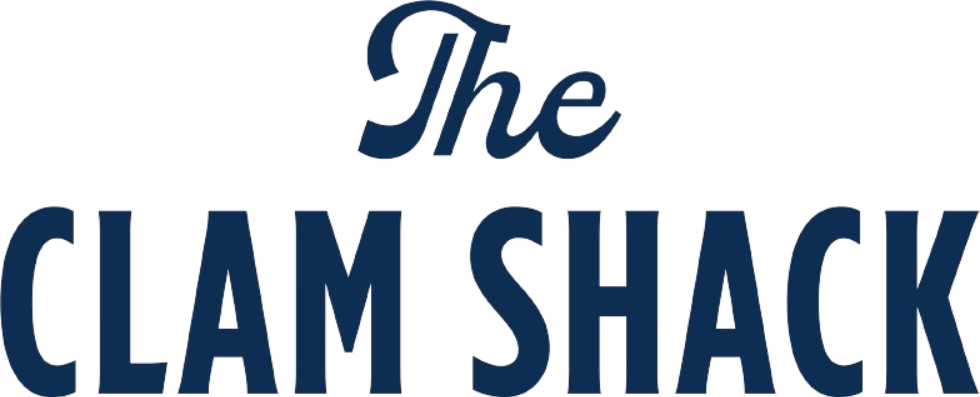

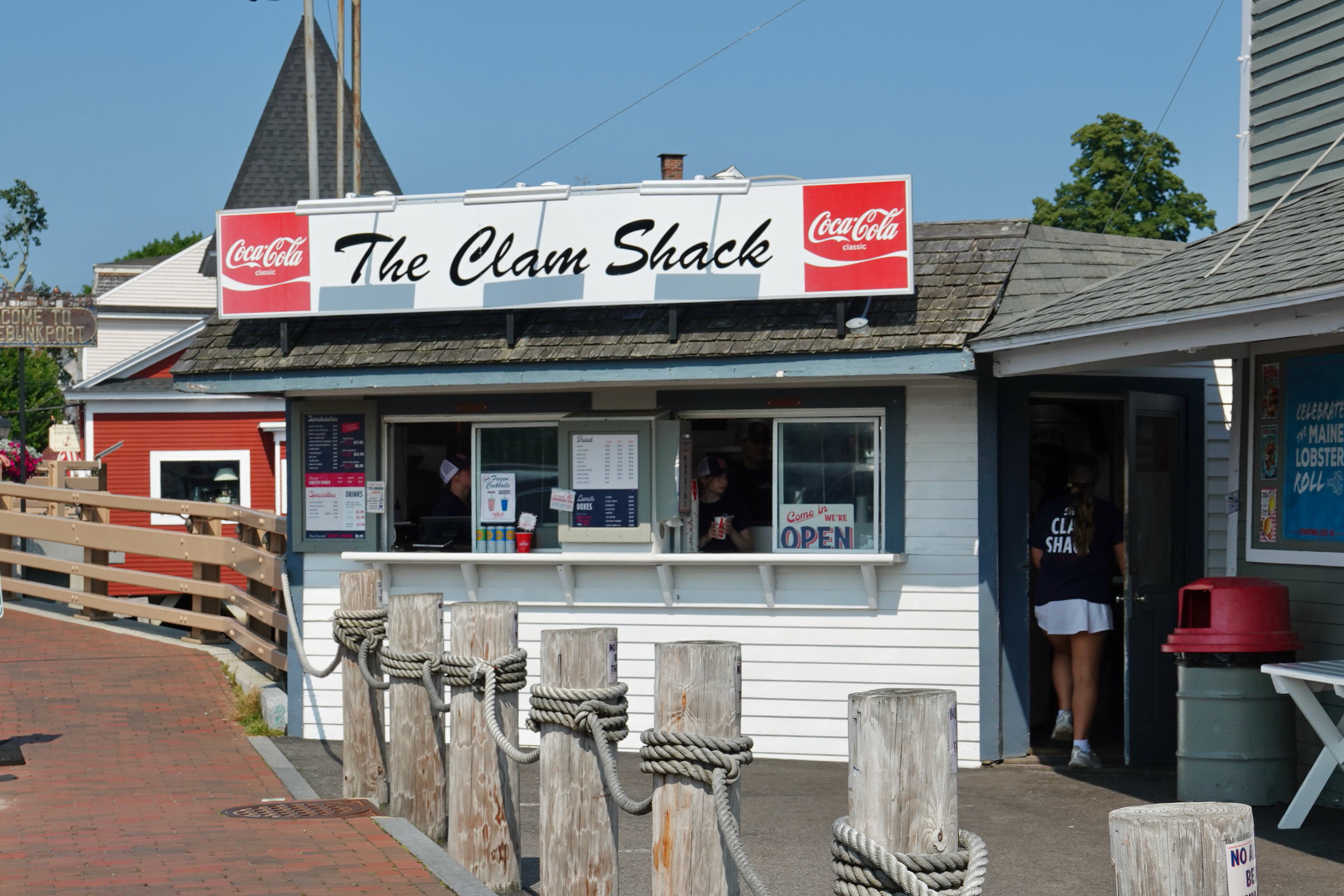
- The Clam Shack in 2024

- Location within Maine Location within the United States

Restaurant information
- Established: 1968
- Owner: Steve Kingston
- Food type: Seafood
- Location: 2 Western Ave, Kennebunkport, ME 04046
- Coordinates: 43.3608°N 70.4784°W
- Website: www.theclamshack.net

The Clam Shack is a seafood restaurant in Kennebunkport, Maine, which serves its food for take-out. It has been in operation since 1968 and serves dishes from New England's cuisine. It is especially known for its lobster rolls. The shack has won accolades from magazines like Gourmet and Travel + Leisure. It is only open from May to October. Many celebrities have been spotted at the restaurant.

== History ==
The fish market The Clam Shack is located in was originally known as Shackford and Gooch and began its operations in the 1930s. The small shack near the river that became The Clam Shack was rented as the restaurant in 1968.

The restaurant is owned by Steve Kingston, who bought it in 2000. Some recipes from the shack were featured in The Bush Family Cookbook, which was published in 2005. It supplied lobster and swordfish to a dinner on Vladimir Putin's diplomatic visit to Walker's Point Estate in Kennebunkport.

== Menu ==
The restaurant sells fried clams, haddock, scallops, shrimp, calamari, chicken fingers, onion rings, bisque, french fries, and clam cake. It also has clam chowder, prawn cocktail, steamed clams, dill pickle, and cole slaw. There is a lobster dinner coming in small, medium, and large sizes. The Clam Shack also sells sandwiches such as burgers, hot dogs, tuna rolls, and grilled cheese.

=== Lobster roll ===
The restaurant's well-known lobster roll is made from 5 oz (140 g) of lobster meat from lobsters trapped off the coast of Kennebunkport. The handpicked claw, knuckle, and tail meat boiled in fresh ocean water to be sandwiched between two family-made rolls from Reilly's Bakery in Biddeford. Lobster rolls are usually served on hot dog buns, setting The Clam Shack apart from many other restaurants. Fifty lobsters are boiled at a time and the lobsters are handpicked because knives can cause oxidation, which may taint the flavor. Customers can add butter, mayonnaise, or both to their bun. The butter is made at Kate's, a creamery in Arundel. It sells kits to make the dish on the online marketplace Goldbelly. At the height of the restaurant's popularity during the summer, The Clam Shack sells over 500 rolls daily. A roll costs US$16 as of 2015.

In addition to winning the Lobster Roll Rumble four times, the dish was selected by The Boston Globe in 2013 as the best in New England.
