= Camille Ford =

American actress

- Born: October 1, 1981 (age 43); Eugene, Oregon
- Occupation(s): television personality, theatrical producer, actress
- Years active: 2010–present
- Website: http://www.camillefordofficialsite.com

Camille Ford (born October 1, 1981) is an American television personality, radio personality, actress and producer. She has hosted numerous network shows including Food Wars on Travel Channel and listed as "up and coming actress to watch" by NY Magazine.

== Early life ==
Ford was born October 1, 1981, in Eugene, Oregon. She and her family of 9 moved to Prescott Valley, Arizona, where she was raised. She attended Idyllwild Arts Academy and graduated from Bradshaw Mountain High School, where she was active in sports, drama, speech and debate. She attended Northern Arizona University in Flagstaff, Arizona, and the American Musical and Dramatic Academy (AMDA).

== Career ==
Ford moved to New York City to pursue her dream of acting.

Ford is presently the host of The Movie Loft, customNATION and The Movie Show, her work includes Design Wars on HGTV, Food Wars and Best Places I've Ever Been on Travel Channel, Grilling with bobby on Food Network, Outside magazine Television, MTV, TLC, Heavy,

Aside from being a TV personality, Ford is an adventure guide and certified fitness professional, Ambassador for Lululemon, Victoria's Secret, and Carver skateboards, advocate for human rights, and owner of Sassy Pole Girls- (sensual and physical fitness for women). Ford is also ranked in the Top 100 Sexiest female celebrities for 2011, 2012 and 2013 by Smartasses.net.

Ford is a performer for various radio programs, theater, webisodes, standup comedy, commercials, and independent films. Receiving multiple Innovative Theatre Award nominations. She was recognized in Time Out Magazine for most promising actor and was listed in NY Magazine's "Top Picks". She has also worked with notable chefs, personalities, and athletes.

Ford has hosted talk shows on SIRIUS Satellite Radio. She has reported news for CW11.

Ford is a producer of the award-winning Jitter, an Off Off Broadway production.

In an effort to "teach women of all ages how to love and appreciate their bodies", Ford founded Sassy Pole Girls (SPG) in 2008. Pole dancing has recently become an exercise craze for women.

== Other activities ==
Ford is an avid athlete, playing competitive sand volleyball, soccer, racquetball, football, and mountain biking.
