= Sonoran hot dog =

Mexican-style hot dog

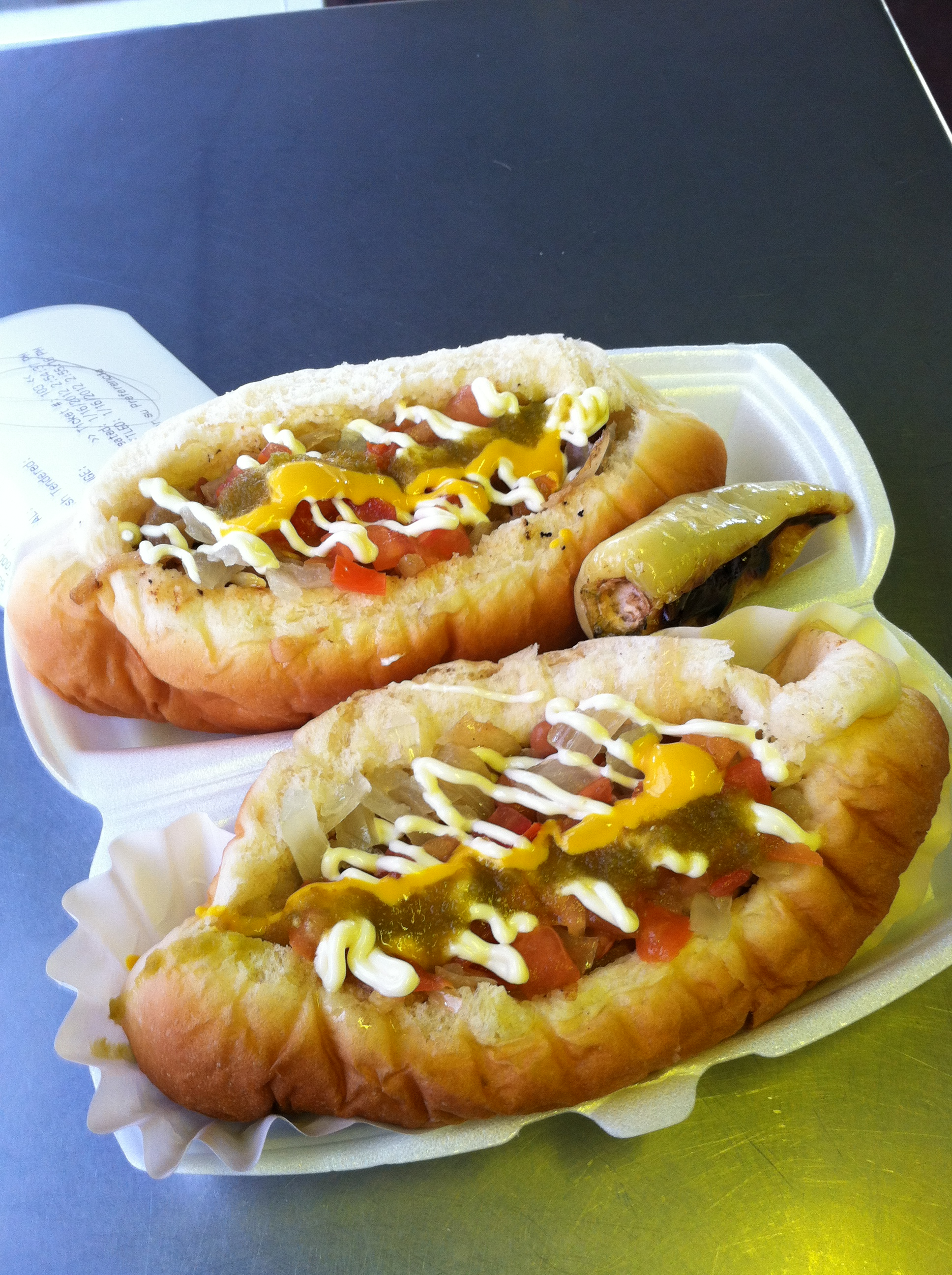
Two Sonoran dogs topped with minced onion, green chile sauce, diced tomato, pinto beans, mustard, and mayonnaise.

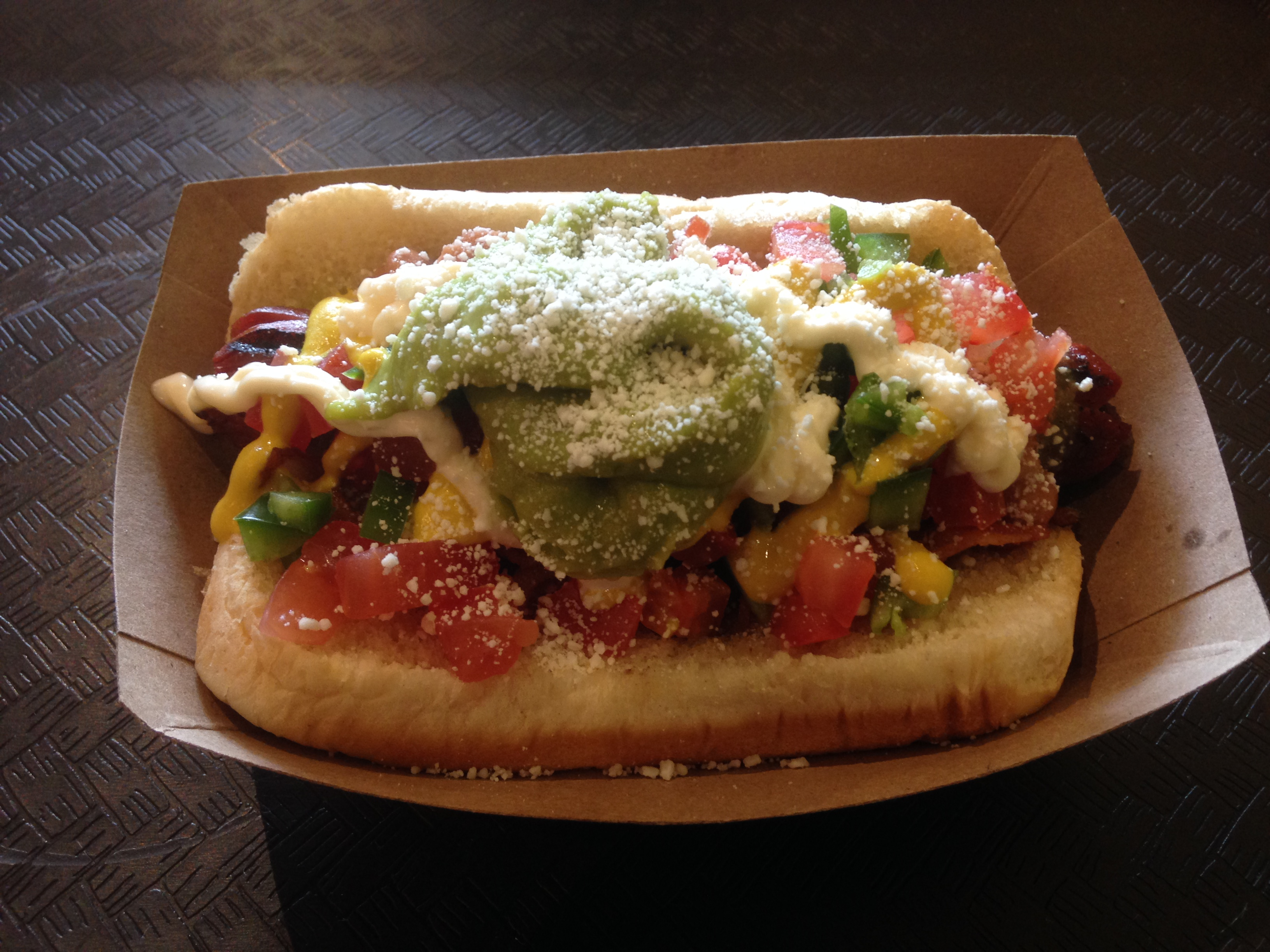
A Sonoran hot dog, with pinto beans, tomatoes, green salsa, jalapeño, mustard, and mayonnaise, and with avocado and cotija cheese on top

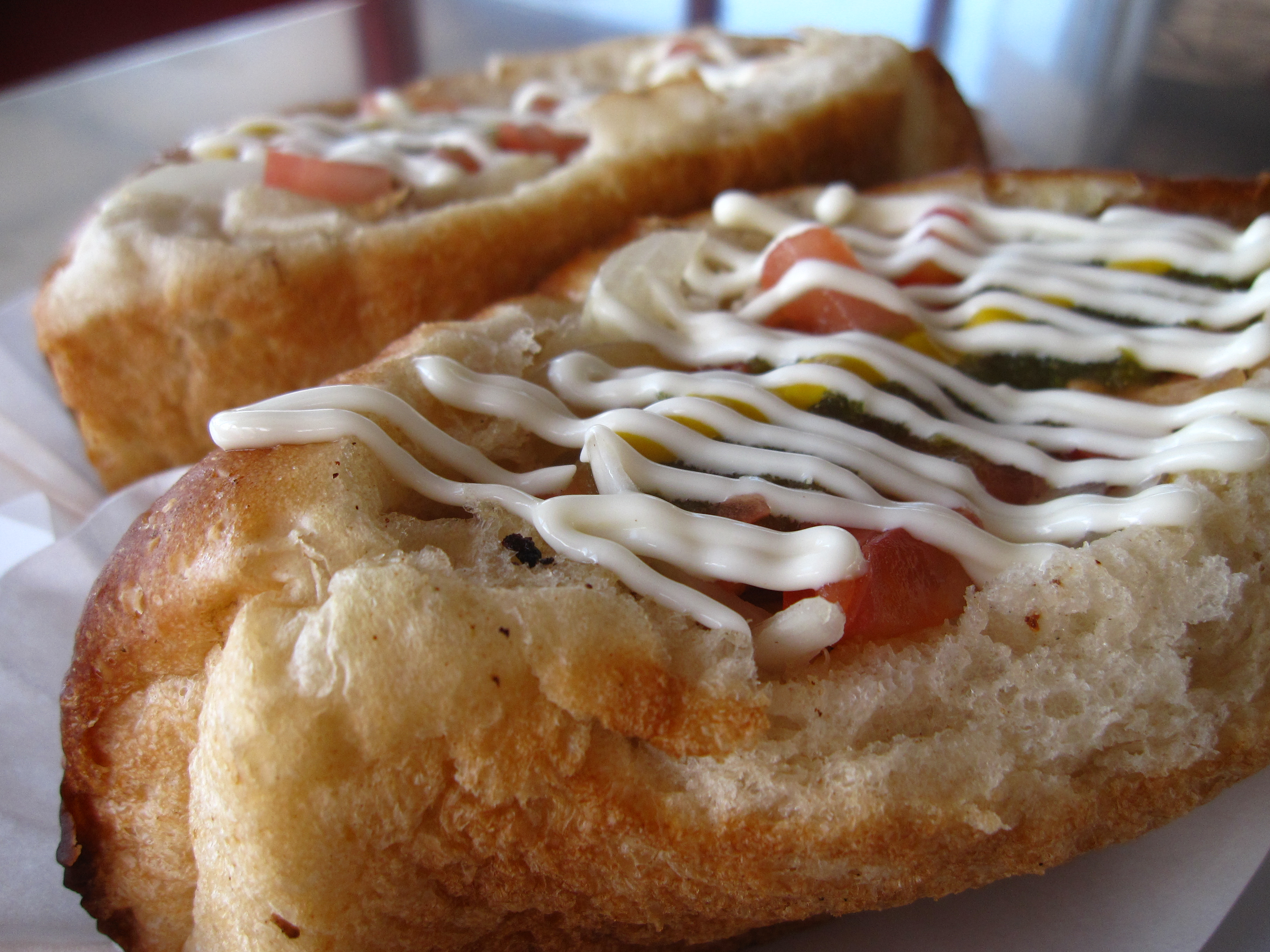
Sonoran hot dogs, with mayonnaise on top

The Sonoran hot dog is a style of hot dog that originated in Hermosillo, the capital of the Mexican state of Sonora, in the late 1980s, though some theorize its existence as early as the 1940s. It is popular in Tucson, Phoenix, and elsewhere in southern Arizona. It consists of a hot dog that is wrapped in bacon and grilled, served on a bolillo-style hot dog bun, and topped with pinto beans, onions, tomatoes, and a variety of additional condiments, often including mayonnaise, mustard, and jalapeño salsa.

The Sonoran hot dog is prepared and sold by vendors called "dogueros" at street carts. It was estimated in 2009 that over 200 places in Tucson offered the Sonoran hot dog, and that Phoenix had even more.

In 2018, the restaurant El Guero Canelo won a James Beard award in the America's Classics category for its Sonoran hot dogs.

== See also ==
- Hot dog variations
- List of hot dogs
