= List of American sandwiches =

This is a list of American sandwiches. This list contains entries of sandwiches that were created in, or commonly eaten in, the United States. A sandwich is a food item consisting of one or more types of food placed on or between slices of bread, or more generally any dish wherein two or more pieces of bread serve as a container or wrapper for some other food. The sandwich was originally a portable food item or finger food which originated in the Western world, but is now found in various versions in numerous countries worldwide.

== American sandwiches ==
Name	Image	Regional availability	Description
American sub		Nationwide	Turkey breast, ham, American or cheddar cheese, chopped or shredded lettuce, tomatoes and onions
Beef Manhattan		Midwest; origins in Indianapolis, Indiana	Roast beef and gravy served open faced, often with mashed potatoes on top or on the side
Beef on weck		Buffalo, New York	Roast beef on a kimmelweck roll, often with horseradish
BLT		Nationwide	Bacon, lettuce, and tomato
Bologna sandwich		Nationwide	Traditionally made from pre-sliced bologna sausage between slices of white bread, along with various condiments, such as mayonnaise, mustard, and ketchup
Breakfast sandwich		Nationwide	Often made with eggs, cheese, and either bacon, sausage, or ham
Cheese dream		Nationwide	Open-faced grilled cheese sandwich with bacon
Cheese sandwich		Nationwide	A basic sandwich generally made with one or more varieties of cheese on any sort of bread, see related grilled cheese
Cheeseburger		Nationwide	Meat patty on a roll with cheese, often served with lettuce, tomato, pickles, and other toppings
Cheesesteak		Nationwide; origins in Philadelphia	Made with thinly sliced pieces of beefsteak mixed with cheese on a hoagie roll, with additional toppings often including peppers, onions, and mushrooms
Chicken sandwich		Nationwide	A sandwich which typically consists of a boneless, skinless breast of chicken served between slices of bread, on a bun, or on a roll.
Chopped cheese		New York City	Also known as "chop cheese", a type of sandwich originating from New York City. It is made on a grill with ground beef, onions, and topped by melted cheese and served with lettuce, tomatoes, and condiments on a hero roll.
Chow mein sandwich		New England	Gravy-based chow mein mixture placed on a hamburger bun, served hot
Clam roll		New England	Fried clams served in a New England hotdog bun
Club sandwich		Nationwide	Sliced cooked poultry, fried bacon, lettuce, tomato, and mayonnaise, often on toast
Crab cake sandwich		Nationwide; origins in Chesapeake Bay region	Crab cake on a roll, often with a sauce such as tartar sauce
Cuban sandwich		Tampa and Miami	Developed in Tampa, Florida, despite the name. Made with ham, roasted pork, Swiss cheese, pickles, mustard, and sometimes salami on Cuban bread.
Cudighi		Upper Peninsula of Michigan	Spicy Italian sausage served on a long, hard roll, often with mozzarella cheese and tomato sauce
Dagwood sandwich		Nationwide	Tall, multi-layered sandwich made with a variety of meats, cheeses, and condiments; named after comic-strip character Dagwood Bumstead
Denver sandwich		Denver	Denver omelette on bread
Diablo sandwich		Uncertain	Inspired by the film Smokey and the Bandit; various recipes proposed
Fat sandwich		New Brunswick, New Jersey	Combination of ingredients such as burgers, cheese, chicken fingers, French fries, mozzarella sticks, gyro meat, bacon, etc.
Fluffernutter		New England	Peanut butter and marshmallow fluff usually served on white bread
Fool's Gold Loaf		Denver	Peanut butter, banana, 1 pound of bacon, grape jelly, on French bread; made popular by Elvis
French dip		Nationwide; origins in Los Angeles	Thinly sliced roast beef on a French roll or baguette, usually served au jus
Fried-brain sandwich		Midwest	Sliced calves' brains on sliced bread
Gerber sandwich		St. Louis	Half section of Italian or French bread, spread with garlic butter and topped with ham, and Provel or Provolone cheese, seasoned with a sprinkling of paprika and then toasted
Ham and cheese sandwich		Nationwide	Ham and cheese, often on white bread
Hamburger		Nationwide; origins disputed	One or more cooked patties of ground meat, usually beef, placed inside a sliced bread roll or bun, often served with cheese, lettuce, tomato, bacon, onion, pickles, and condiments such as mustard, mayonnaise, ketchup, relish, and chiles
Hamdog		Decatur, Georgia	Hot dog wrapped in a beef patty, deep-fried, covered with chili, a handful of French fries, and a fried egg
Handwich		Orlando, Florida	A cone-shaped piece of bread with a sweet or savory filling, intended to be held and eaten with one hand
Horseshoe sandwich		Springfield, Illinois	Open-faced sandwich consisting of thick-sliced toasted bread, a hamburger patty, French fries, and a "secret" cheese sauce
Hot brown		Louisville, Kentucky	Variation of Welsh rarebit, consisting of turkey, bacon, and Mornay sauce
Hot dog		Nationwide	A cooked sausage, traditionally grilled or steamed and served in a partially sliced bun
Italian beef		Chicago	Seasoned roast beef, dripping with meat juices, on an Italian-style roll, often served with peppers
Italian sandwich		Nationwide; origins in Maine	Various meats, cheeses, and vegetables on Italian bread
Jucy Lucy		Minneapolis–Saint Paul	Cheeseburger with cheese inside the patty, as opposed to on top
Limburger sandwich		Midwest	Limburger cheese on bread
Lobster roll		New England	Lobster meat served on a hot dog roll, often with butter
Luther Burger		Nationwide; origins are disputed	Hamburger or cheeseburger served between two glazed doughnuts
Maxwell Street Polish		Chicago	Polish sausage with grilled onions and yellow mustard served on a bun
Meatloaf sandwich		Nationwide	Meatloaf with sauce served on sliced bread
Melt sandwich		Nationwide	Some type of filling (such as beef or tuna) served on bread with melted cheese
Monte Cristo sandwich		Nationwide	Ham and cheese sandwich dipped in egg and fried
Muffuletta		New Orleans	Muffuletta loaf split horizontally and covered with layers of marinated olive salad, mortadella, salami, mozzarella, ham, and provolone
Pastrami on rye		Nationwide; origins in New York City	Pastrami on rye bread
Patty melt		Nationwide	Hamburger patty topped with caramelized onions and cheese, between two slices of bread
Peanut butter and jelly sandwich		Nationwide	Peanut butter and jelly or jam on bread
Peanut butter, banana and bacon sandwich		Nationwide	Peanut butter, banana, and bacon bread; also known as an "Elvis sandwich"
Pilgrim		Nationwide; origins in New England	Roast turkey, cranberries or cranberry sauce and cheddar cheese
Pimento cheese		The South; origins in the North	A spread or relish made with cheese, mayonnaise, pimentos, salt and pepper, blended to either a smooth or chunky paste. Regional variations incorporate additional ingredients.
Pit beef sandwich		Baltimore	Roast pit beef, onions, and horseradish on a Kaiser roll
Po' boy		Nationwide; origins in Louisiana	Roast beef or fried seafood served on a baguette
Polish Boy		Cleveland	Kielbasa on a bun, with french fries, barbecue sauce or hot sauce, and coleslaw
Pork tenderloin sandwich		Midwest	Breaded and fried pork cutlet served on a roll or bun
Primanti sandwich		Pittsburgh	Grilled meat, melted cheese, an oil & vinegar-based coleslaw, tomato slices, and French fries between two thick slices of Italian bread.
Reuben sandwich		Nationwide; origins in Omaha, Nebraska	Corned beef, Swiss cheese, sauerkraut, and Russian dressing, grilled between slices of rye bread
Roast beef sandwich		Nationwide	Roast beef on bread
Roast pork Italian		Philadelphia	Italian-style roast pork shoulder (porchetta), broccoli rabe, and sharp provolone cheese on a hoagie roll
Runza		Nebraska and environs	Beef, pork, cabbage or sauerkraut, onions, and seasonings in a bread pocket
Sailor sandwich		Richmond, Virginia	Hot pastrami, grilled knackwurst, melted Swiss cheese and hot mustard on rye bread
Sandwich loaf		Nationwide	Any variety of ingredients assembled in a manner which resembles a layer cake
Sandwich wrap		Nationwide	Meats, cheeses, and vegetables served in a wrap
Sausage sandwich		Nationwide	Sausage and other ingredients on bread
Sealed crustless sandwich		Nationwide	Filling sealed inside one large layer of bread
Sloppy joe		Nationwide; origins are unclear	Ground beef, onions, tomato sauce or ketchup, Worcestershire sauce, and other seasonings, served on a hamburger bun
Sloppy joe (New Jersey)		New Jersey	A double decker thin sliced rye bread sandwich made with one or more types of sliced deli meat, such as turkey, ham, pastrami, corned beef, roast beef, or sliced beef tongue, along with Swiss cheese, coleslaw, and Russian dressing
Spiedie		Binghamton, New York	Cubes of marinated chicken, pork, lamb, veal, venison or beef, served on a bun or between slices of Italian bread
St. Paul sandwich		St. Louis	Egg foo young patty (made with mung bean sprouts and minced white onions) served with dill pickle slices, white onion, mayonnaise, lettuce, and tomato between two slices of white bread
Steak sandwich		Nationwide; many local variations	Chipped beef served on a bun or roll
Submarine sandwich		Nationwide; many local variations	Length of bread or roll split lengthwise and filled with a variety of meats, cheeses, vegetables, and condiments
Tavern sandwich		Great Plains	Unseasoned ground beef on a bun, mixed with sauteed onions, and sometimes topped with pickles, ketchup and mustard
Tuna fish sandwich		Nationwide	Tuna fish served on bread
Turkey Devonshire		Pittsburgh	Hot open-faced sandwich on toasted bread with hot turkey, bacon, tomatoes, and a cheese sauce
North Shore 3-way		Boston, MA	Hot roast beef sandwich with sauce (usually James River), cheese, and mayo. Typically served on an onion roll.
Veggie burger		Nationwide	Hamburger-style patty made only of non-meat ingredients

== See also ==
- American Sandwich: Great Eats from All 50 States
- List of bread dishes
- List of sandwiches
- List of submarine sandwich restaurants
- List of American foods
- List of foods
- List of hamburgers
- Sandwich bread
- Sandwiches That You Will Like
