= Kelly's Roast Beef =

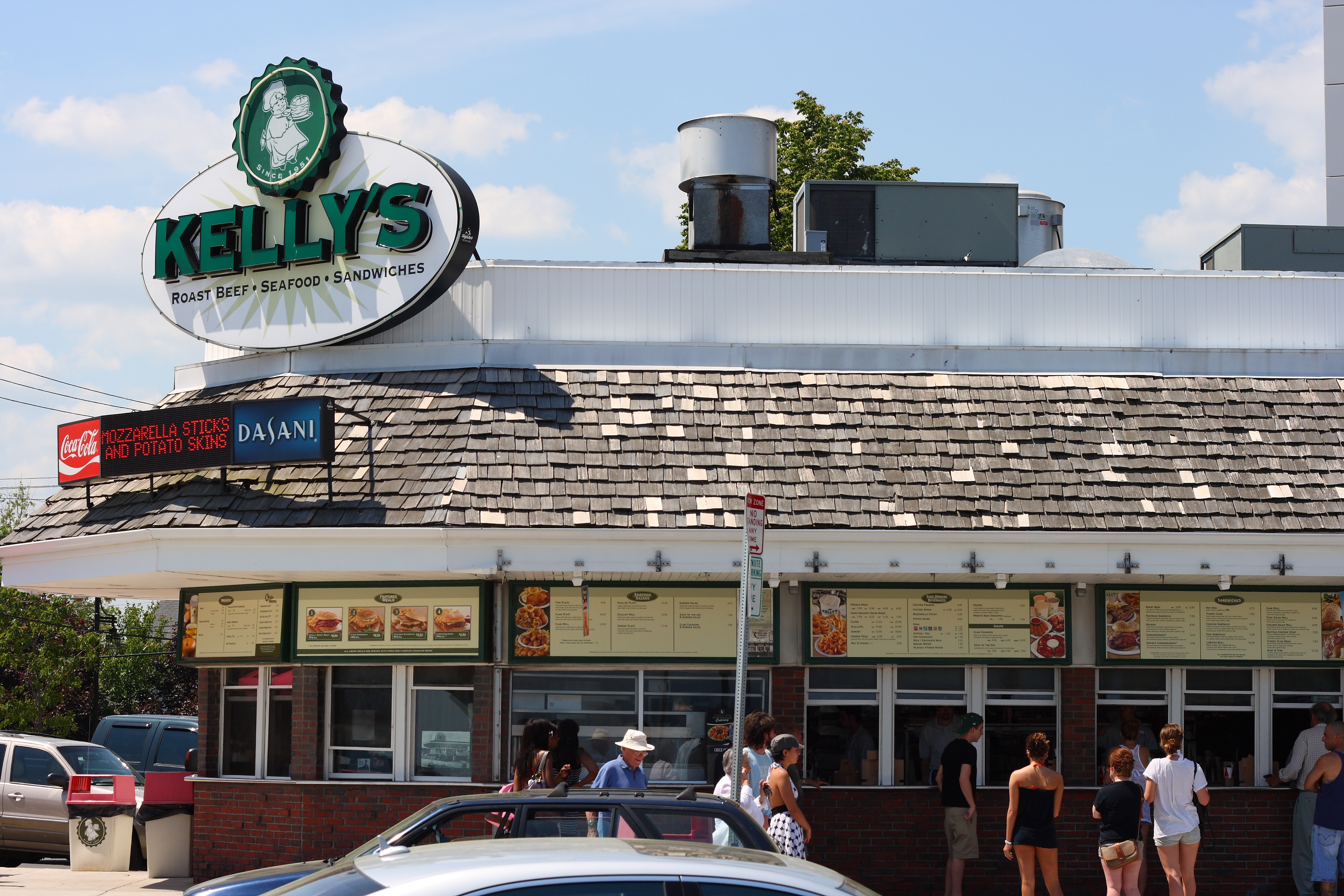
- Kelly's location at Revere Beach.

Restaurant information
- Established: 1951
- Location: 410 Revere Beach Boulevard, Revere, Suffolk County, Massachusetts, 02151, United States
- Other locations: Danvers; Medford; Saugus; Dedham
- Website: kellysroastbeef.com

Kelly's Roast Beef is a regional fast food restaurant chain located in Massachusetts and New Hampshire. It is known for its roast beef sandwiches, lobster rolls, and other seafood. It was founded in 1951 in the city of Revere, Massachusetts, on Revere Beach shoreline by two partners, Frank V. McCarthy, and Raymond Carey. Neither partner wanted to be the namesake of the restaurant, so they decided to name it after a mutual friend, Thomas Kelly, a florist from Dorchester.

The chain's menu consists primarily of sandwiches, seafood, and shellfish, as well as its signature roast beef. The restaurant features a drive-thru at every location except at Revere Beach. To compete with fast food giants like McDonald's and Burger King, the company added chicken fingers and french fries to their menu.

Kelly's claims to have invented the modern roast beef sandwich, stating it was unknown before they introduced it in 1951.

== Menu and recognition ==
Despite its name, Kelly's Roast Beef is also noted for its lobster roll, with frequent mentions on reader contributor websites like Yelp and Chowhound, and placings on top ten lists of the area's best.

Kelly's has become nationally known and has been featured in the PBS documentary Sandwiches That You Will Like and on the Food Network show $40 a Day.

== Locations ==
Massachusetts locations include the flagship restaurant in Worcester, Dedham, Revere, Danvers, Medford, and Saugus. In 2022, Kelly's opened in New Hampshire and Florida, with further expansion in the works.
