= Beef ring =

Beef rings are farm cooperatives organized around the slaughter of cattle, with each member being required to supply one animal over the course of the summer to the cooperative for slaughter.

== History ==
Beef rings were common among North American farmers who had no means for refrigeration of meat until the beginning of the 20th century. Although pigs were small enough that a smoked pork carcass could be consumed by a single farming family before the meat spoiled, the same was not true of cattle, and smoked or salted beef was not popular in any case.

After obtaining the slaughtered steer, the meat would be distributed among the members of the cooperative, providing them with a steak, a roast, and a boiling joint each week. By slaughtering each animal in sequence, the cooperative ensured that all members received fresh meat throughout the summer. Distributions were weighed, so that each member received a fair share of the meat.

Beef rings died out for several reasons, including technological advances in refrigeration, greater economic prosperity for farmers, greater independence, and the ability of farmers to buy meat at butchers' shops rather than slaughter and store it themselves.
