= Sandwiches That You Will Like =

- Genre: Documentary
- Country of origin: United States
- Original language: English

Production
- Producer: Rick Sebak
- Running time: 57 minutes

Original release
- Release: September 18, 2002

Sandwiches That You Will Like is a 2002 PBS documentary by Rick Sebak of WQED. The unique sandwich offerings of cities across the United States (although excluding two from California, the remaining sandwiches all originate no further west than Texas) are shown, from those that are often found outside of their city of origin (cheesesteak from Philadelphia) to the virtually unknown (St. Paul in St. Louis).

The sandwiches showcased are:

- Tripe: George's Sandwich Shop — Italian Market, South Philadelphia, Philadelphia, Pennsylvania
- The Elvis: Peanut Butter & Co. — Greenwich Village, Lower Manhattan, Manhattan, New York City, New York (Restaurant and retail shop closed in 2016.)
- Beef on weck: Schwabl's — West Seneca, New York
- Roast beef: Kelly's Roast Beef — Revere Beach, Revere, Massachusetts
- French dip: Philippe's — Downtown Los Angeles, Los Angeles, California
- Italian beef: Mr. Beef — River North, Chicago, Illinois
- Loose meat: Taylor's Maid-Rite — Marshalltown, Iowa
- Cheesesteak: Dalessandro's Steaks and Hoagies — Roxborough, Northwest Philadelphia, Philadelphia, Pennsylvania; Geno's Steaks and Pat's King of Steaks — Passyunk Square, South Philadelphia, Philadelphia, Pennsylvania
- Hoagie: Chickie's Italian Deli — Passyunk Square, South Philadelphia, Philadelphia, Pennsylvania (Closed in 2015.)
- Pig ears and snouts: C & K Barbecue — St. Louis, Missouri
- Brain: Ferguson's Pub — St. Louis, Missouri (Listed as permanently closed on MenuPix website.)
- St. Paul: Kim Van Restaurant — St. Louis, Missouri
- Bánh mì: Huong Lan Sandwiches — East San Jose, San Jose, California; Lucy Sheets, outside My Ngoc Restaurant, Pittsburgh, Pennsylvania
- Primanti: Primanti Bros. — Pittsburgh, Pennsylvania
- Chipped ham: Isaly's, — West View, Pennsylvania
- Hot Brown: Brown Hotel — Louisville, Kentucky
- Lobster roll: Red's Eats — Wiscasset, Maine
- Po' boy: Domilise's Po-Boys and Bar — Uptown New Orleans, New Orleans, Louisiana
- Muffuletta: Central Grocery — French Quarter, New Orleans, Louisiana
- Barbecue: Thelma's Bar-B-Que — Third Ward, Houston, Texas (Closed in 2013.)
- Falafel: Sepal — Watertown, Massachusetts (Closed in 2006.)
- Pastrami: Katz's Delicatessen — Lower East Side, Manhattan, New York City, New York

== See also ==
- List of American sandwiches
- List of sandwiches
