= Pit barbecue =

Method of cooking meat and root vegetables buried below ground

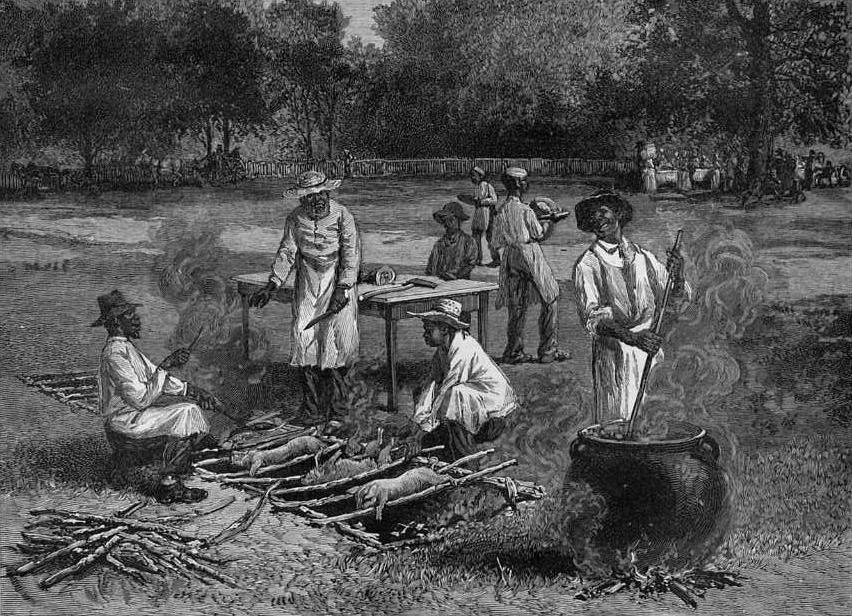
A barbecue pit depicted in A Southern Barbecue, 1887, by Horace Bradley

Pit barbecue is a method and/or apparatus for barbecue cooking meat and root vegetables buried below ground. Indigenous peoples around the world used earth ovens for thousands of years. In modern times the term and activity is often associated with the Eastern Seaboard, the "barbecue belt", colonial California in the United States and Mexico. The meats usually barbecued in a pit in these contexts are beef, pork, and goat.

== California ==
Throughout the New World the indigenous peoples of the Americas cooked in the earth for millennia. The original use of buried cooking in pits in North America was done by the Native Americans for thousands of years, including by the tribes of California.

In the late 18th and early 19th centuries eras, when the territory became Spanish Las Californias and then Mexican Alta California, the Missions and ranchos of California had large cattle herds for hides and tallow use and export. At the end of the culling and leather tanning season large pit barbecues cooked the remaining meat. In the early days of California statehood after 1850 the Californios continued the outdoor cooking tradition for fiestas.

Traditional Californian pit barbecuing is not done often in contemporary times, due to needing space and labor to dig a pit, significant firewood requirements, and air quality concerns. However, in 2007 the 'Culinary Historians of Southern California' recreated an Early California pit barbecue on the grounds of the Mexican Rancho San Jose, at the Ygnacio Palomares Adobe in Pomona. It required burning hundreds of pounds of wood in the pit over the preceding night, then lowering cloth-wrapped, marinated meat into the resulting pit of coals and covering everything with earth. After cooking all night, participants pronounced the results "incredibly tender, deeply smoky meat." A traditional Horno was used for baking.

The Santa Maria Style BBQ, originally from the Central Coast of California, uses a portable 'towed' trailer version frequently seen at farmers markets.

== Eastern seaboard ==
Pit barbecuing is also popular along the Eastern Seaboard of the U.S. The buried version of the New England clam bake is one example. In Maryland it is done at large "bull roasts" in the summer season and "bull and oyster roasts" in colder months. Maryland-style pit beef is not barbecue cookery in the strictest sense. Instead, it is typically cooked quickly over charcoal. The meat is typically served rare with a strong horseradish sauce as the condiment.

== Southern-style pit barbecue ==
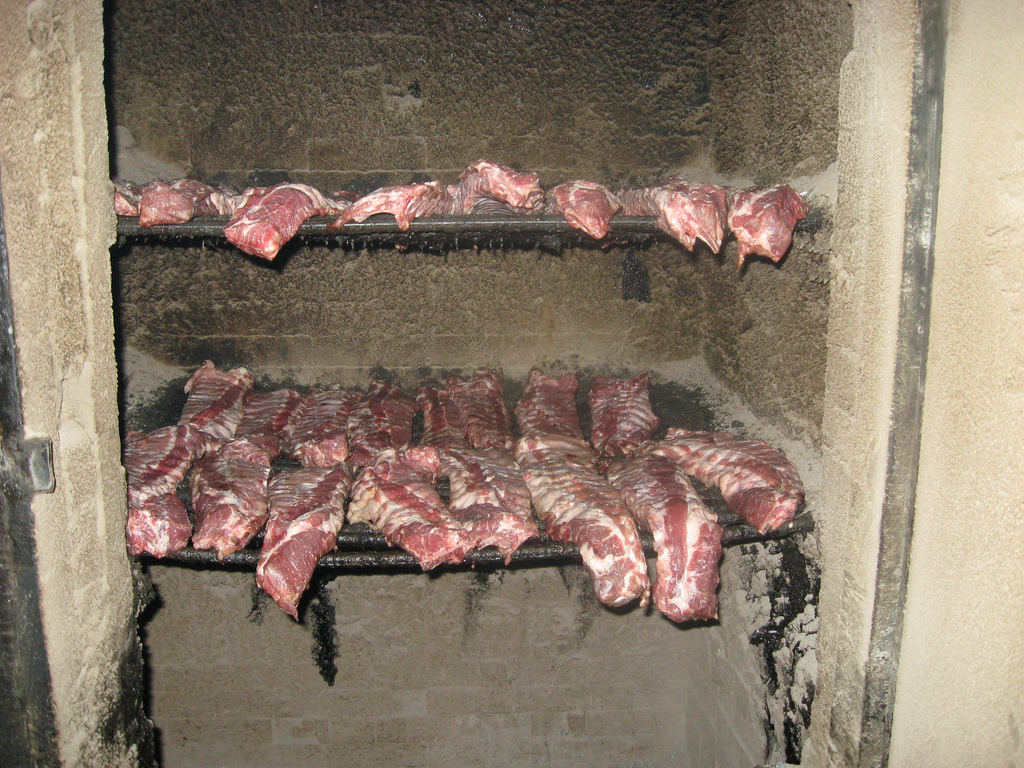
Pork ribs in a barbecue "pit", Memphis, Tennessee, USA

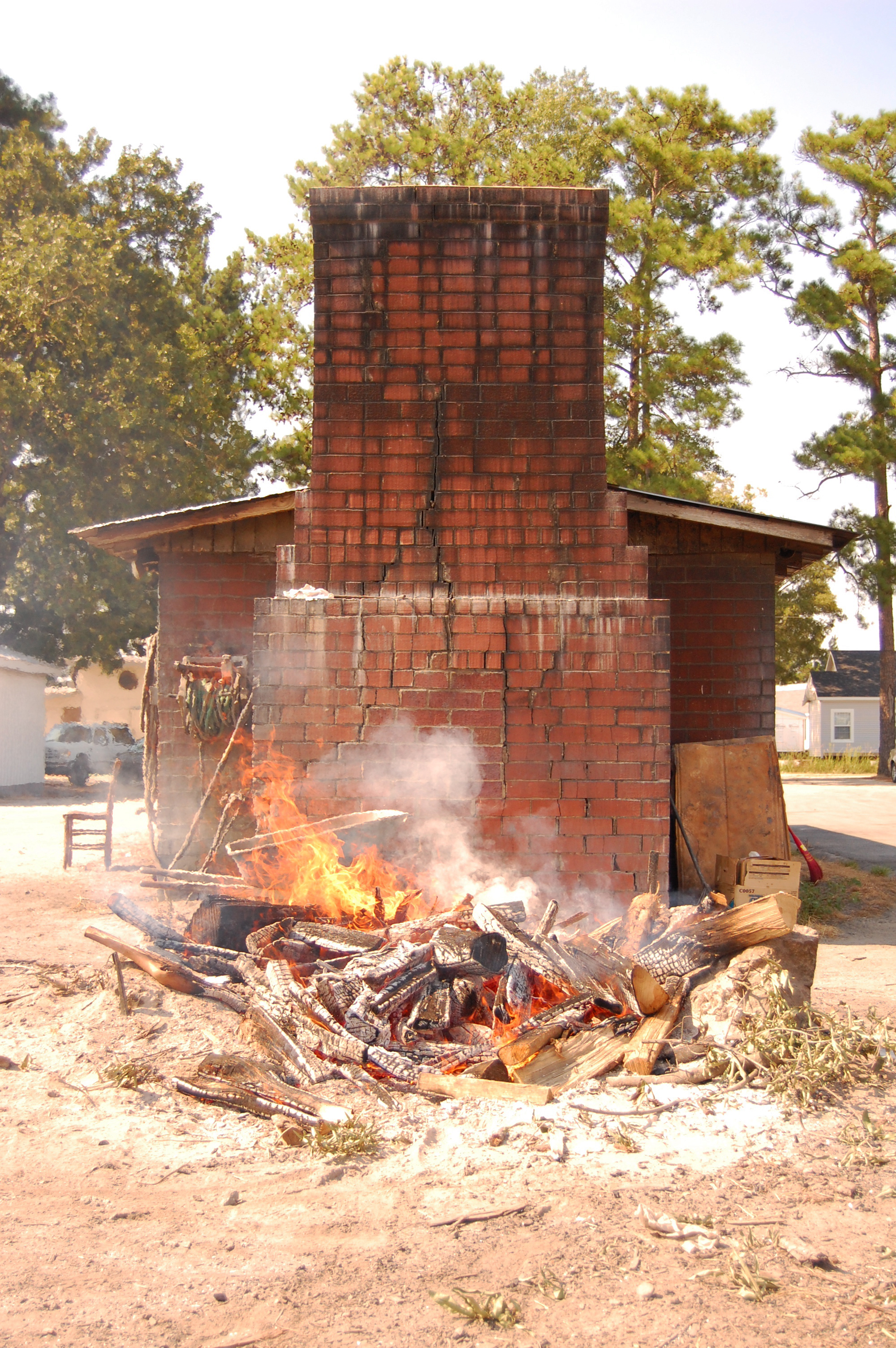
A wood-fired barbecue pit at Wilber's Barbecue, Goldsboro, North Carolina, USA

Across the "barbecue belt" of the United States, pit barbecue can also refer to an enclosed, above-ground "pit" such as a horno or outdoor pizza oven. The method of cooking the meat is slowly, using various hardwoods to flavor the meat. This breaks down the connective tissue in the meats, producing a tender product. The types of meat cooked in this fashion include both beef and pork.

== See also ==
- Zarb Dish
- Kalua
- Fire pit
- Earth oven
- Category index - Earth ovens
- Category index - Barbecues
- List of ovens
- Whole hog barbecue
