= Beef on weck =

Roast beef sandwich on a kummelweck roll

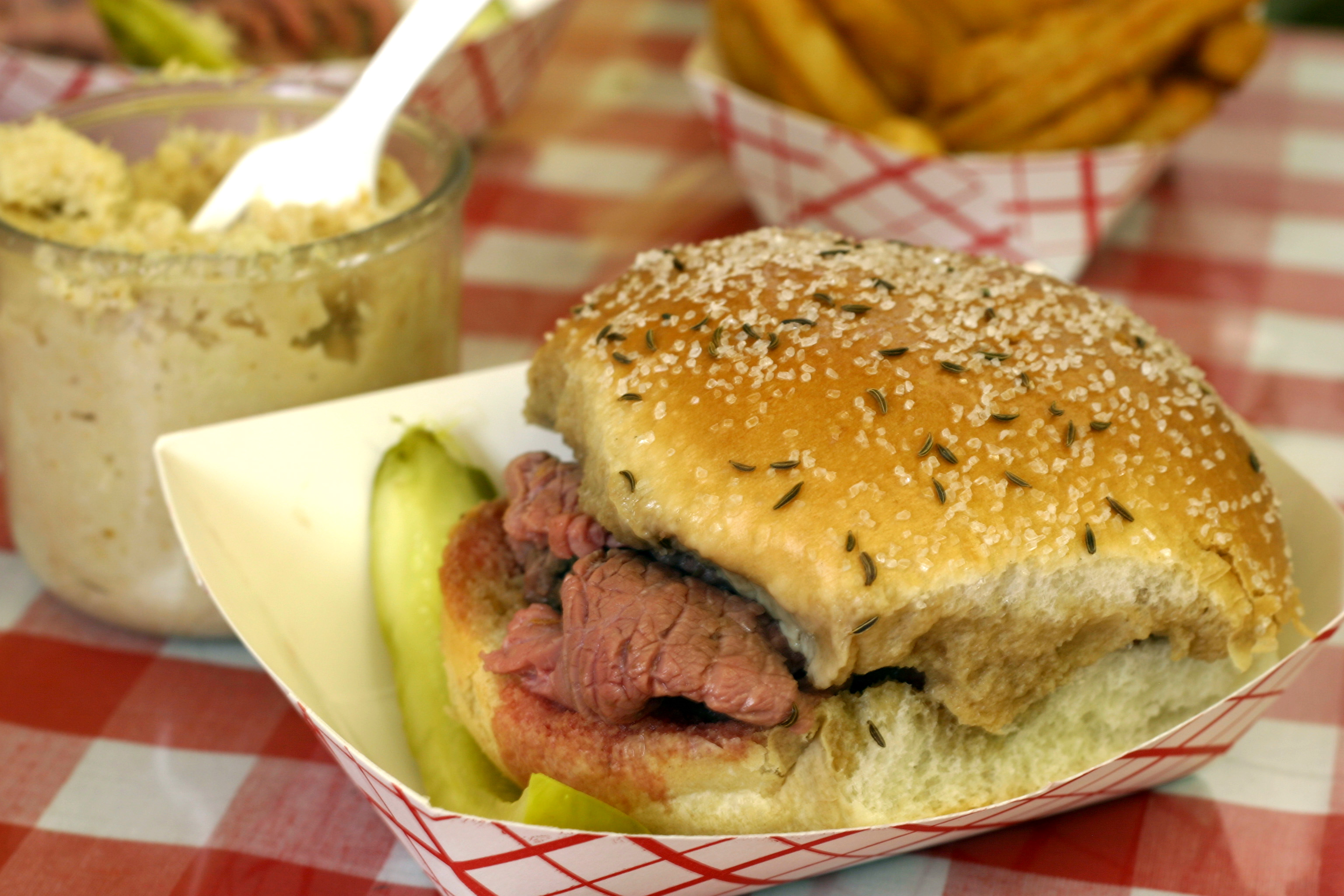
- A beef on weck
- Course: Main
- Place of origin: United States
- Region or state: Buffalo, New York
- Main ingredients: Kummelweck roll, sliced roast beef, horseradish, au jus

A beef on weck is a sandwich found primarily in Western New York State, particularly in the city of Buffalo. It is made with roast beef on a kummelweck roll, a roll that is topped with kosher salt and caraway seeds. The meat on the sandwich is traditionally served rare, thin cut, with the top bun getting a dip in jus and spread with horseradish.

The beef on weck sandwich, along with Buffalo wings and sponge candy, is one of the three best-known food specialties of Buffalo.

== Origin ==
The origin and history of the beef on weck sandwich is not well established but is thought to predate the 1960s development of Buffalo wings by approximately a century. It is believed that a German baker named William Wahr, who is thought to have immigrated from the Black Forest region of Germany, created the kummelweck roll while living in Buffalo, New York. Wahr may have based the kummelweck roll on a special loaf left as a ceremonial offering for the dead known in Swabia as Schwäbische Seele, which is a thin roll resembling a baguette that is topped with salt and caraway seeds. The sandwich's creation is estimated to have taken place some time in the mid-19th century, according to a butcher in Western New York.

A local pub owner is said to have used the roll to create the beef on weck, with the thought that the salty top of the roll would encourage his patrons to purchase more drinks.

== Bread ==
The kummelweck roll (sometimes spelled "kümmelweck"), topped with kosher salt and caraway seeds, gives the sandwich its name and a distinctive taste. Kümmel is the German word for caraway, and Weck means "roll" in the south-western German dialects of Palatinate, the Saarland, Baden and Swabia areas (northern Germans generally say Brötchen). However, the roll used for this American sandwich tends to be softer and fluffier than a standard German Kümmelbrötchen or Kümmelweck. In Austria, a similar type of small white-bread is known as Kümmelweckerl (diminutive from Wecken, which refers to a whole big bread, i.e., Brotwecken).

Buffalo-area bakeries are the only commercial source for the roll.

== Preparation ==
A typical beef on weck is made from slow-roasted rare roast beef that is hand-carved in thin slices, served on a kummelweck roll. The cut face of the top half of the roll may be dipped in the jus from the roast. Prepared horseradish is usually provided for the diner to spread to taste on the top half of the roll. Preparation is often done in view at a carving station.

== Popularity ==
The beef on weck has long been popular regionally, and has gained a following in other areas of the United States where it has been introduced. Expatriates from Western New York have taken the dish and brought it to other areas after relocating. For example, PJ's BAR-B-QSA in Saratoga Springs in Eastern New York is noted for its beef on weck. It has also been featured by chefs on cooking shows including the PBS special Sandwiches That You Will Like. Bobby Flay, Anthony Bourdain and other chefs have featured the beef on weck, or a variant, on their television programs.

The American restaurant chain Buffalo Wild Wings was started by former residents of the Western New York area and the original name of the restaurant was "Buffalo Wild Wings and Weck", abbreviated as "BW3", the third W referring to weck. Some still refer to the company with the extra "W" in its abbreviation, despite the fact it was removed in 1998. The chain used to serve an updated version of the beef on weck called the Thirty-Fifth Weck Sandwich.

The Daily Meal reviewed the beef on weck as a "roast beef sandwich that dreams are made of" in their article "12 Life-Changing Sandwiches You've Never Heard Of".

== See also ==
- French dip sandwich
- Italian beef
- List of American sandwiches
- List of sandwiches
- List of regional dishes of the United States
- Pastrami on rye
- Pit beef
