= Roast beef sandwich =

Sandwich made from roast beef

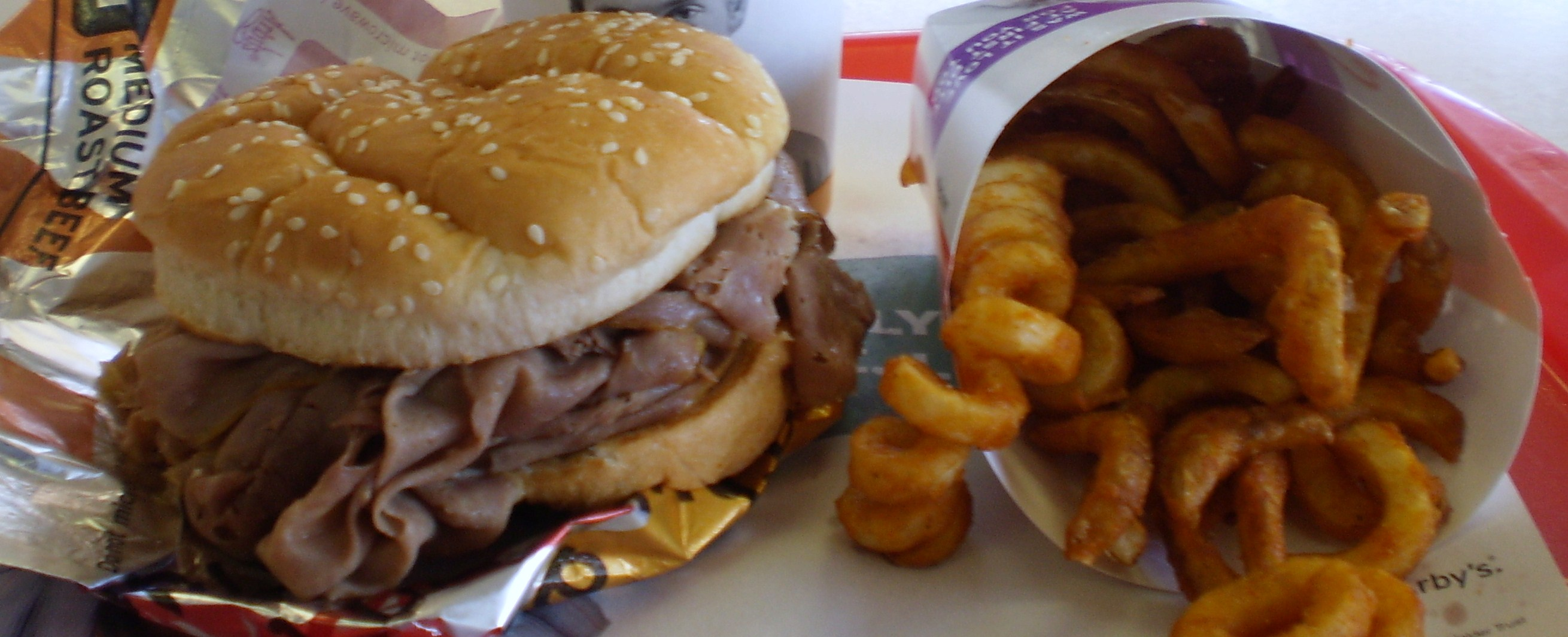
Arby's hot roast beef sandwich with fries

The roast beef sandwich is a sandwich that is made out of sliced roast beef or sometimes beef loaf, frequently using cold roast beef (either the leftovers from a homemade dinner or deli meat). This style of sandwich often comes on a hamburger bun and may be topped with barbecue sauce and/or melted American cheese, while other popular ingredients include lettuce, tomatoes, and mustard, although it would not be uncommon to find cheese, horseradish, fresh or powdered chili pepper, or red onion. Roast beef sandwiches may be served hot or cold, and are sometimes served open-faced. It is sold at many diners in the United States, as well as fast food chains such as Arby's, Rax Roast Beef, and Roy Rogers Restaurants, while offered at many pubs in the UK and at festivals.

== History ==
Roast beef sandwiches have been eaten since the 19th century. John Keats mentions roast beef sandwiches on a walking tour of Scotland he enjoyed in 1818. Some trace the origins of the modern (American-style) roast beef sandwich as far back as 1877, with the then little known "beefsteak toast" recipe: cold beef, bread and gravy dish. In 1900, the dish was described by The Washington Post as "unattractive" and as "a tired ark in a gravy flood". The dish gained popularity in the coming years and by 1931, some critics even went as far as to describe it as "a true taste of South Dakota".

== By region ==
Roast beef sandwiches have been a specialty of the Boston area, in particular in the North Shore of Massachusetts, since the early 1950s, typically served very rare, thinly sliced (sometimes referred to as shaved) and piled on an onion roll. Restaurants specializing in it include Harrison's, Nick's of Beverly, and Bill and Bob’s of Woburn.

In Brooklyn a small handful of establishments, beginning with Brennan & Carr in 1938, have served a variant of the sandwich.

In the UK, a roast beef sandwich is often served hot with fried onions, gravy and horseradish sauce.

== Similar sandwiches ==
=== Beef on weck ===
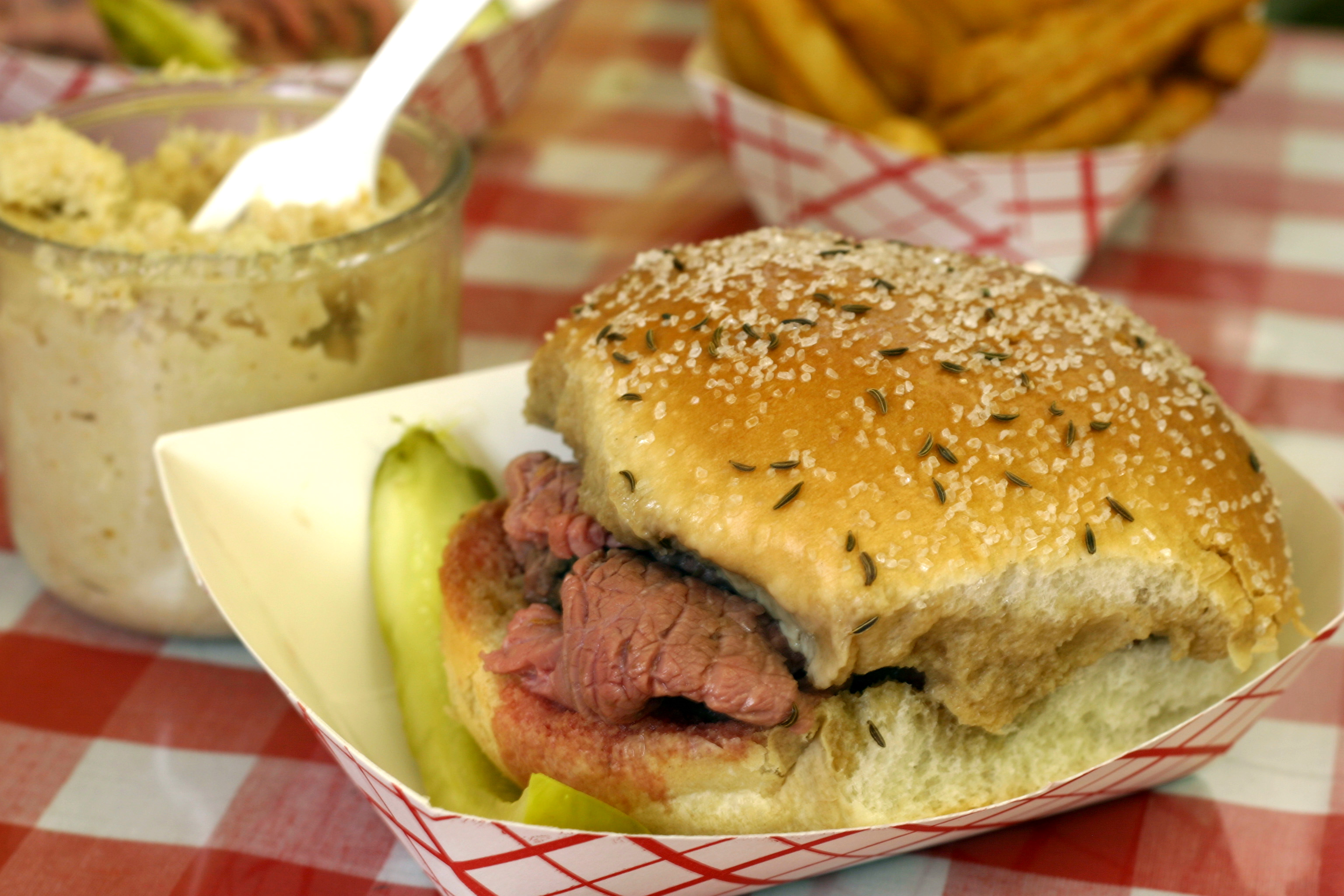
A traditional beef on weck sandwich

The beef on weck is a sandwich found primarily in Western New York. It is made with roast beef on a kummelweck roll topped with salt and caraway seeds. The meat on the sandwich is traditionally served rare, thin cut, with the top bun getting a dip au jus and topped with horseradish.

=== Chivito sandwich ===
The chivito sandwich is a national dish in Uruguay, and consists primarily of a thin slice of filet mignon (churrasco beef), with mozzarella, tomatoes, mayonnaise, black or green olives, and commonly also bacon, fried or hard-boiled eggs and ham. It is served in a bun, often with a side of French fries. Other ingredients might be added into the sandwich such as red beets, peas, grilled or pan-fried red peppers, and slices of cucumber.

=== Corned beef sandwich ===
The corned beef sandwich is a sandwich prepared with corned beef. The salt beef style corned beef sandwiches are traditionally served with mustard and a pickle. In the United Kingdom, pickle is a common addition to a corned beef sandwich.

=== French dip ===
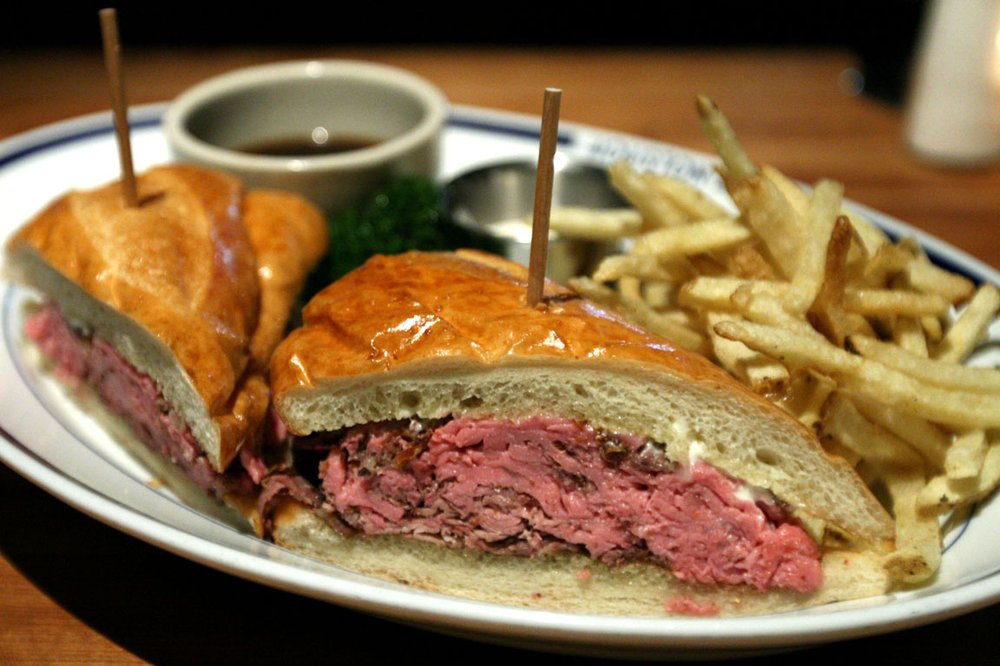
A French dip sandwich

The French dip sandwich is a hot sandwich consisting of thinly sliced roast beef (or, sometimes, other meats) on a "French roll" or baguette. It is usually served au jus, that is, with beef juice from the cooking process. Beef broth or beef consommé is sometimes substituted. Despite the name, this American specialty is almost completely unknown in France, the name seeming to refer to the style of bread rather than an alleged French origin.

=== Pastrami on rye ===
The pastrami on rye is a classic sandwich made famous in the Jewish kosher delicatessens of New York City. First created in 1888 by Sussman Volk, who served it at his deli on Delancey Street in New York City, it became a favorite at other delis, served on rye bread and topped with spicy brown mustard. Delis in New York City such as Katz's Delicatessen have become known for their pastrami on rye sandwiches.

Similar sandwiches

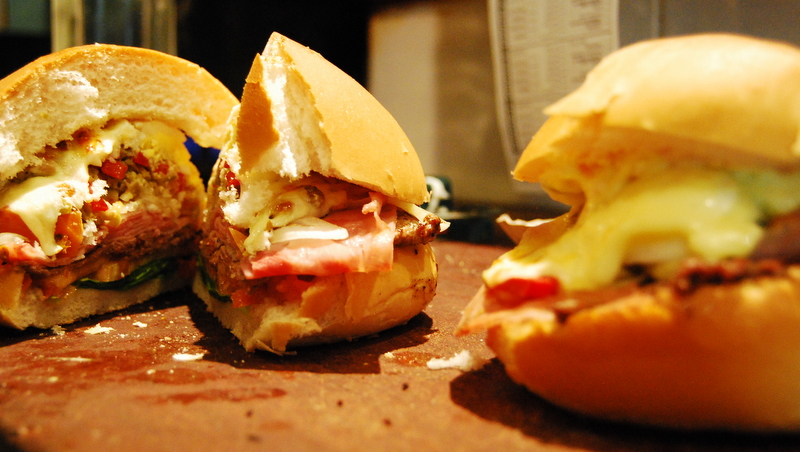
Chivito sandwiches

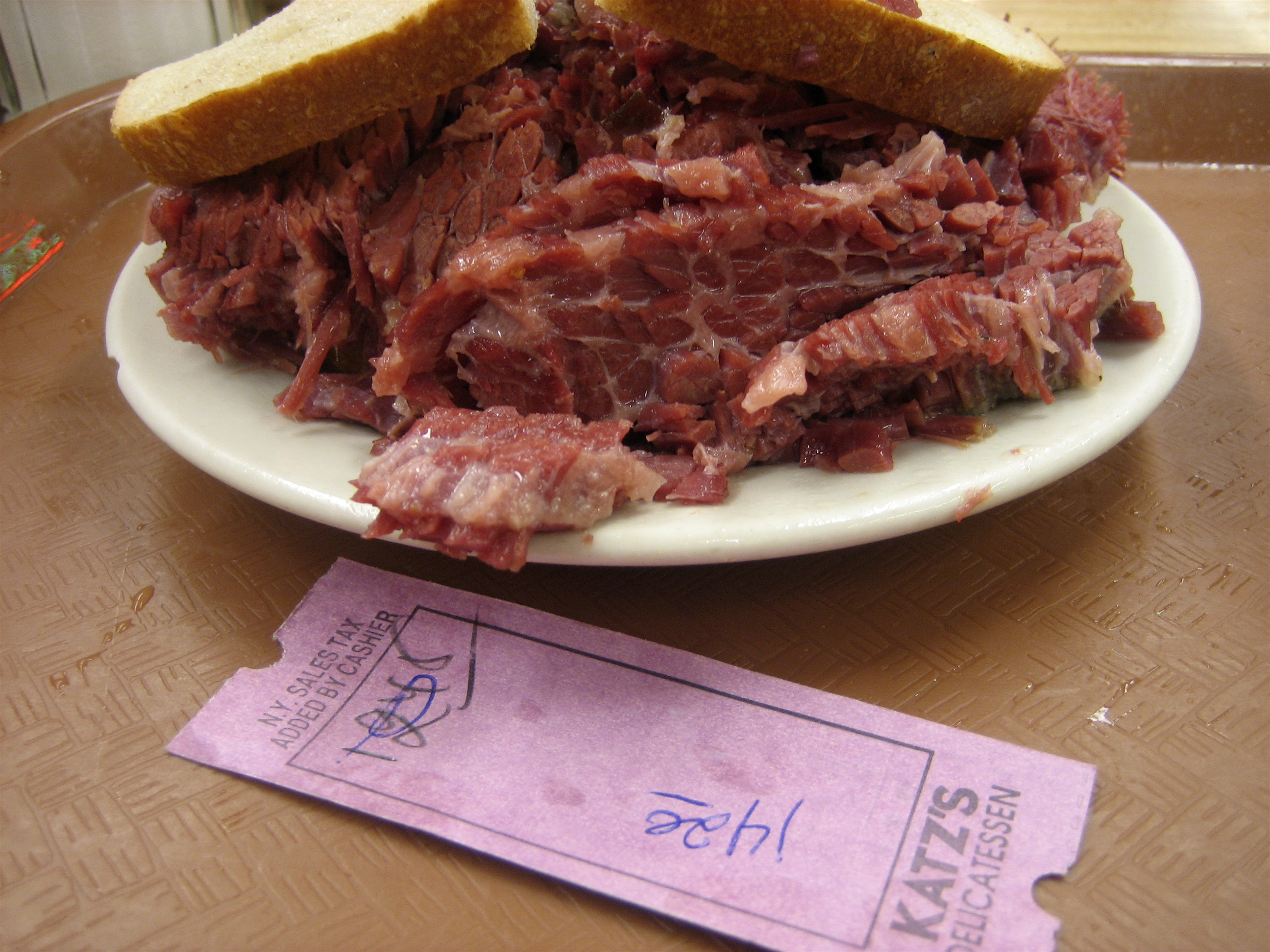
A corned beef sandwich

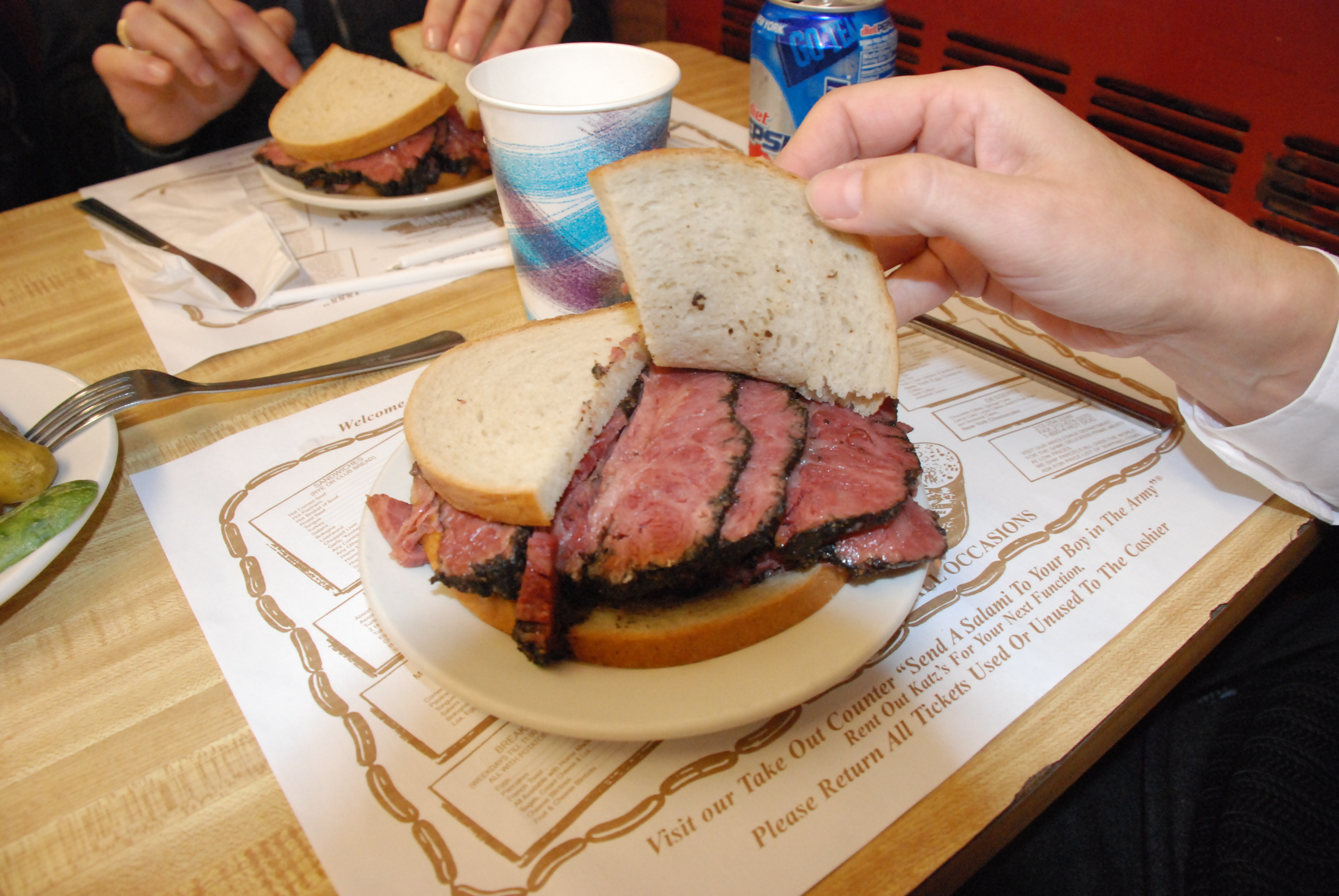
A pastrami on rye sandwich

== See also ==
- List of American sandwiches
- List of beef dishes
- List of sandwiches
- Steak sandwich
  - Cheesesteak
- Bauru (sandwich)
