= Mr. Beef =

Restaurant in Chicago

Coordinates: 41°53′40″N 87°38′14″W

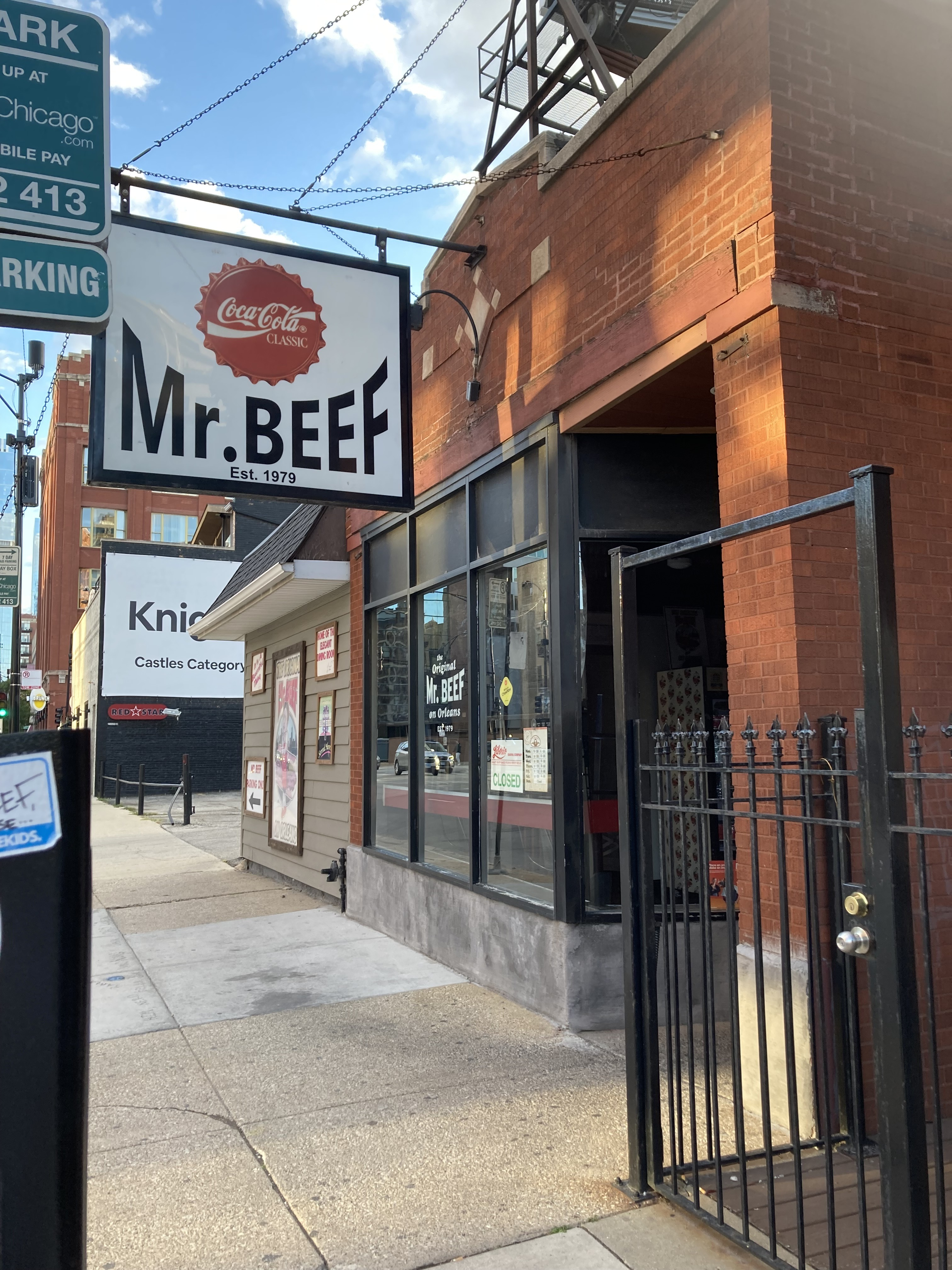
- Mr. Beef from street level, as of September 2022.
- Interactive map of Mr. Beef

Restaurant information
- Established: 1979
- Previous owner: Joe Zucchero
- Food type: Italian beef
- Location: 666 N Orleans St, Chicago, Illinois, 60654, USA

Mr. Beef is an Italian beef restaurant located in River North, Chicago, United States.

== Information ==
The restaurant was founded by Joe Zucchero and originally started out as a stand in 1979. The restaurant features Italian beef sandwiches, hamburgers, hot dogs, french fries and pizza puffs. The restaurant survived financial troubles in 2009.

The restaurant is most notable for being the inspiration and the storefront for the television series The Bear, which is about an Italian beef restaurant in Chicago. Christopher Storer, the producer of the show, cites Chris Zucchero, Joe Zucchero's son, as a friend. The television series more than doubled business at the store, as they went from selling 300 sandwiches a day to over 800. The owner of Mr. Beef, Joe Zucchero, died on March 1, 2023, though the restaurant stayed open after his death.

== In popular culture ==
Along with being featured on The Bear, the restaurant was featured on Food Wars, The Tonight Show with Jay Leno The Tonight Show Starring Jimmy Fallon, and Rick Sebak's Sandwiches That You Will Like.
