= Melt sandwich =

Type of hot sandwich containing cheese

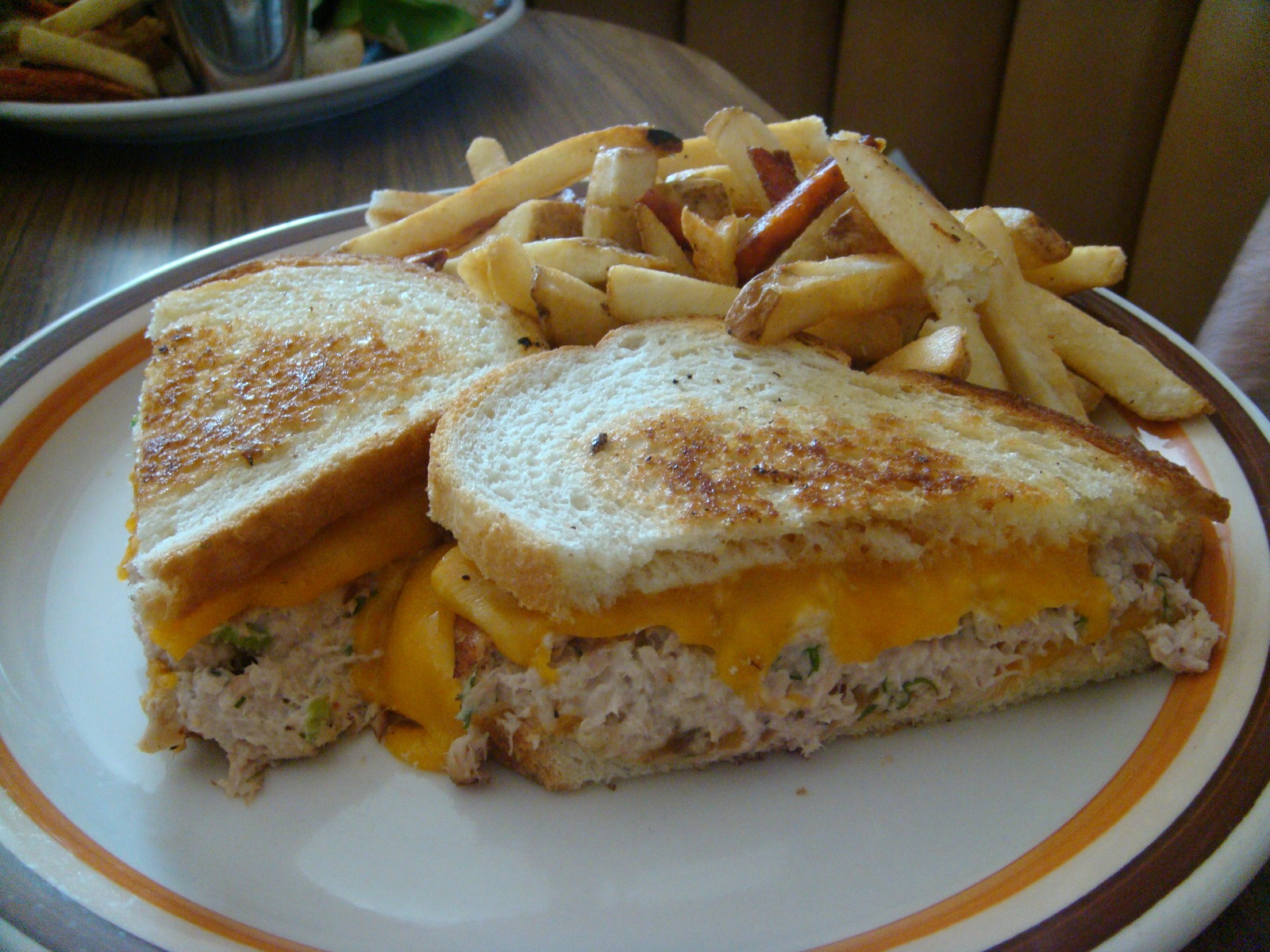
- A tuna melt on a plate with French fries
- Alternative names: Toasted cheese sandwich, toastie
- Type: Sandwich
- Place of origin: United States
- Main ingredients: cheese, filling (tuna with mayonnaise, ham, roast beef, chicken, turkey, or a hamburger patty)

A melt sandwich is a type of hot sandwich containing a suitable meltable cheese (sometimes grated) and a filling of meat or fish. The sandwich is grilled on the stovetop until the cheese melts (hence the name) and the bread is toasted, or heated in an oven.

One common type is the tuna melt, a melt sandwich filled with canned tuna that has been mixed with mayonnaise (tuna mayo) and other ingredients such as pickles, tomato, and onion. Other popular choices are ham, roast beef, chicken, turkey, or a ground beef patty (for a patty melt). Both patty melts and tuna melts are staples of the traditional American diner; patty melts were commonly found on menus by the 1940s.

== See also ==
- List of sandwiches
- Cheeseburger
- Croque monsieur
- Gerber sandwich
- Horseshoe sandwich
- Hot Brown
- Monte Cristo sandwich
- Open sandwich
- Panini
- Sandwich toaster
- Tuna fish sandwich
