= Michetta =

Italian white bread

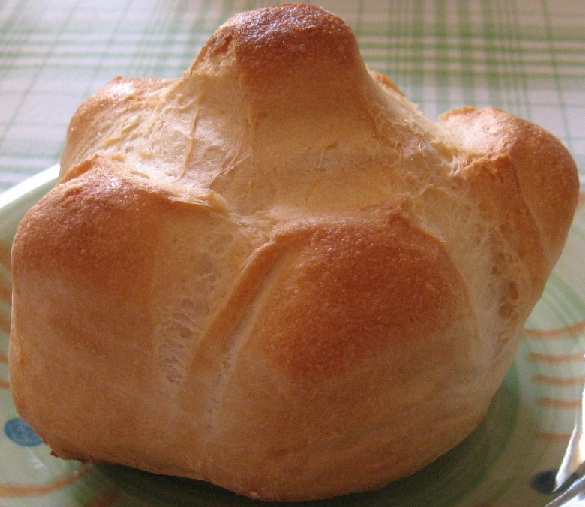
- Alternative names: Rosetta
- Type: Bread
- Place of origin: Italy
- Region or state: Lombardy; Rome, Lazio

Michetta (Italian: [miˈketta]; Italian for 'little crumb', only used in northern Italy) or rosetta (Italian for 'little rose', used in the rest of the country) is an Italian white bread, recognizable by its bulged shape.

== History ==
Michetta is a variation of the Austrian Kaisersemmel brought to Milan in the 19th century during the Austrian rule. Functionaries of the Austrian empire introduced a number of food products, including the Kaisersemmel, a type of bread with segments resembling a small rose.

However, due to the higher humidity, the michetta produced in Milan is made with a modified recipe, and only lasts one day.

The michetta rolls are highly leavened, more than the Viennese Kaisersemmel, so the interior is almost hollow, producing a very light roll with hard crust. They do not keep well, and are best eaten freshly baked.

The new type of bread was called michetta, from the Lombard version of Kaisersemmel, micca, a term originally meaning 'crumb'.
