= Bull roast =

Barbecue dish

A bull roast is a meal where beef, typically not an entire bull, is roasted over an open pit barbecue and then sliced up and served. It is similar in concept to a pig roast. The meat at a bull roast is sometimes pit beef and is often accompanied by oysters.

== See also ==
- Whole hog barbecue

== Sources ==
- Where There's Smoke There's BBQ
- OLL 10th Annual Bull Roast
