= Pit beef =

Roast beef prepared over a charcoal fire

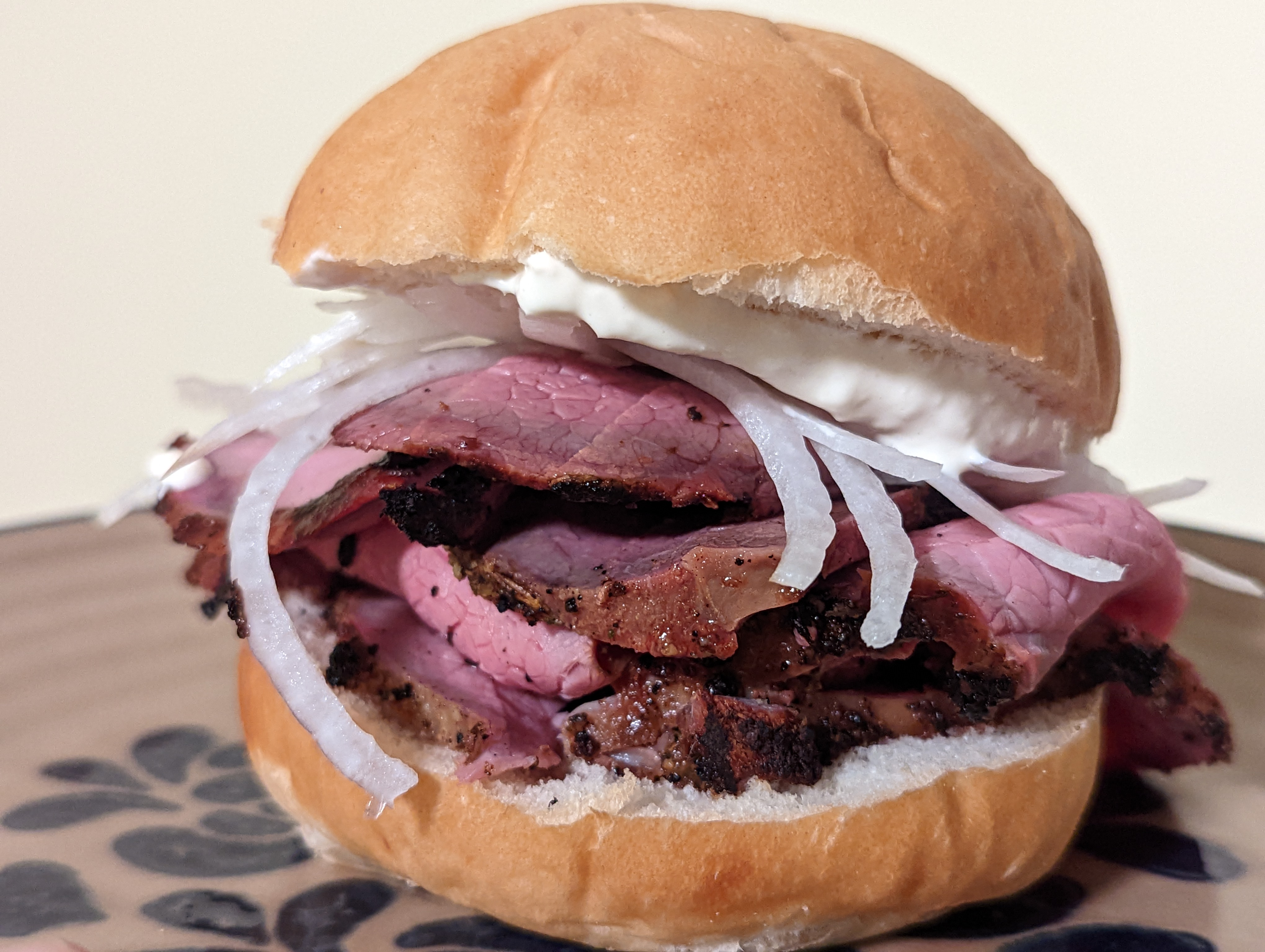
A pit beef sandwich with tiger sauce and onions

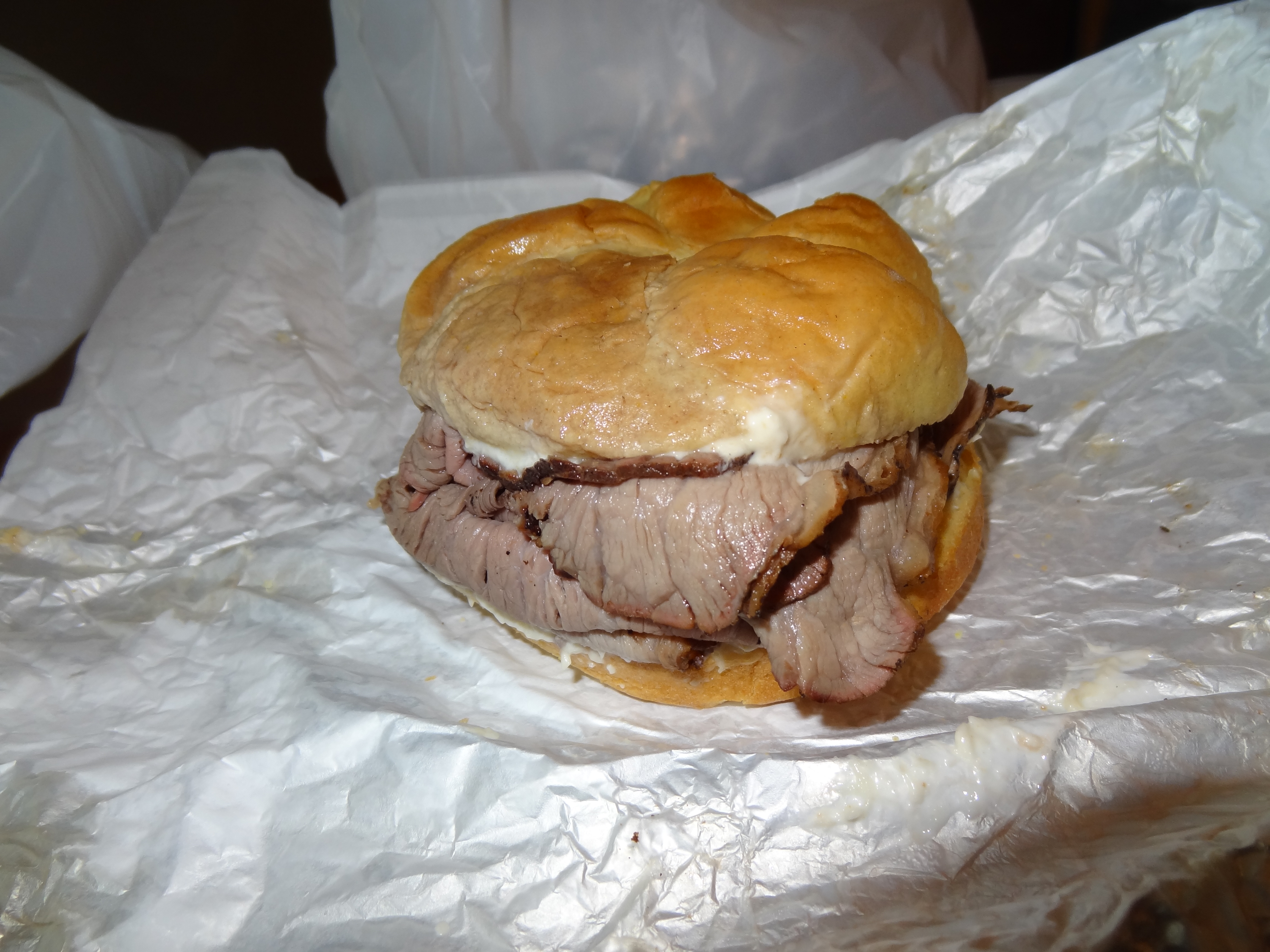
A pit beef sandwich with tiger sauce

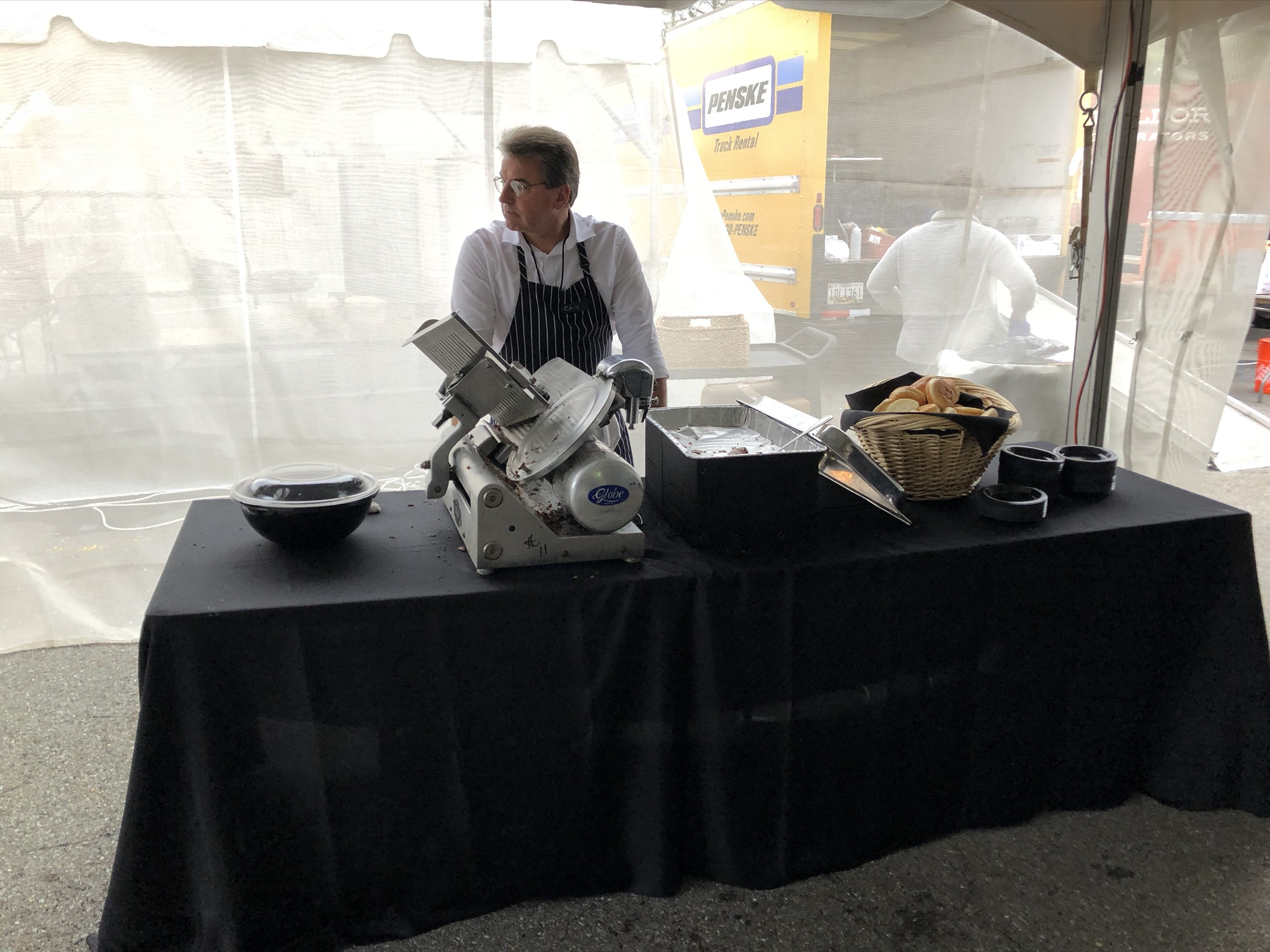
Station for preparing pit beef sandwiches

Pit beef is a dish of roast beef prepared over a charcoal fire, commonly using top round cuts of beef. The cooked roast is sliced thinly and often served on a Kaiser roll, and may be topped with horseradish or tiger sauce (horseradish and mayonnaise) and sliced raw onion. Unlike barbecue, the meat is cooked quickly at high temperatures, served rare, and has a light smoke flavor. Pit beef historically was sold at roadside stands.

It gained a national reputation from the HBO show, The Wire, which is set in Baltimore.

In addition, it was featured prominently in the story line of John Waters's 1998 film Pecker, which was set in Baltimore.

== History ==
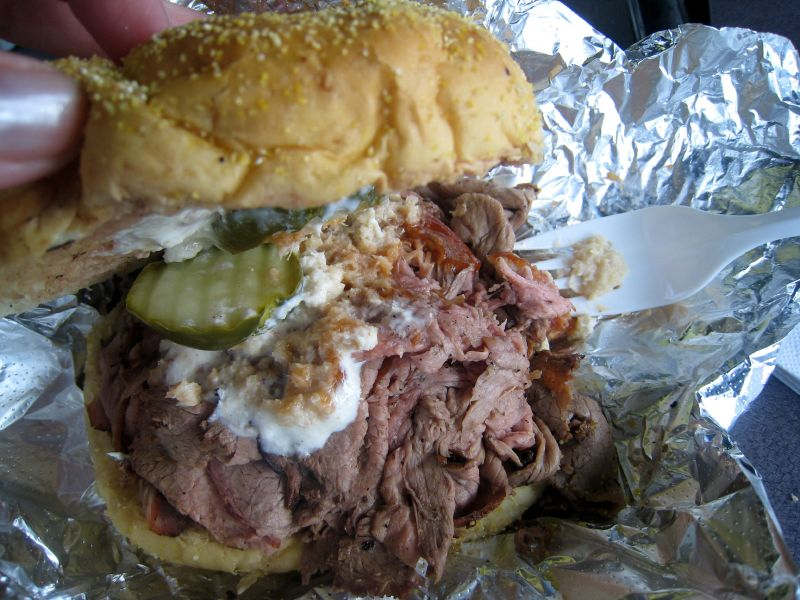
Pit Beef Sandwich from Chap's

The preparation is a local specialty in the area around Baltimore, Maryland. The origin of the specific name "pit beef" dates to the 1970s on Baltimore's east side, along Pulaski Highway, and became popular in the 1980s.

Associated with the working-class neighborhoods around Bethlehem Sparrows Point Shipyard, pit beef owes much to the German and Jewish food cultures of Baltimore. The Kaiser roll was popularized by the city's large German immigrant population and tiger sauce was first produced by Tulkoff Foods, a kosher horseradish manufacturer. Tiger sauce is named after the founder's son, Sol Tulkoff's 802nd Tank Destroyer Battalion during World War II.

Well-known vendors of pit beef sandwiches include Chaps Pit Beef, a former roadside stand on Baltimore Route 40.

== See also ==
- Bull roast
- List of beef dishes
