= American Sandwich =

2004 American cookbook by Becky Mercuri

American Sandwich: Great Eats from All 50 States
- Author: Becky Mercuri
- Publisher: Gibbs Smith
- ISBN: 9781586854706
- OCLC: 1145799563
- Website: https://archive.org/details/americansandwich0000merc

American Sandwich: Great Eats from All 50 States is an illustrated cookbook written by Becky Mercuri. The book provides information on the history of the sandwich and includes sandwich recipes from across the United States such as Colorado's Denver sandwich, Florida's Cuban sandwich and Louisiana's Muffuletta.
