= Kaiser roll =

Austrian breadstuff

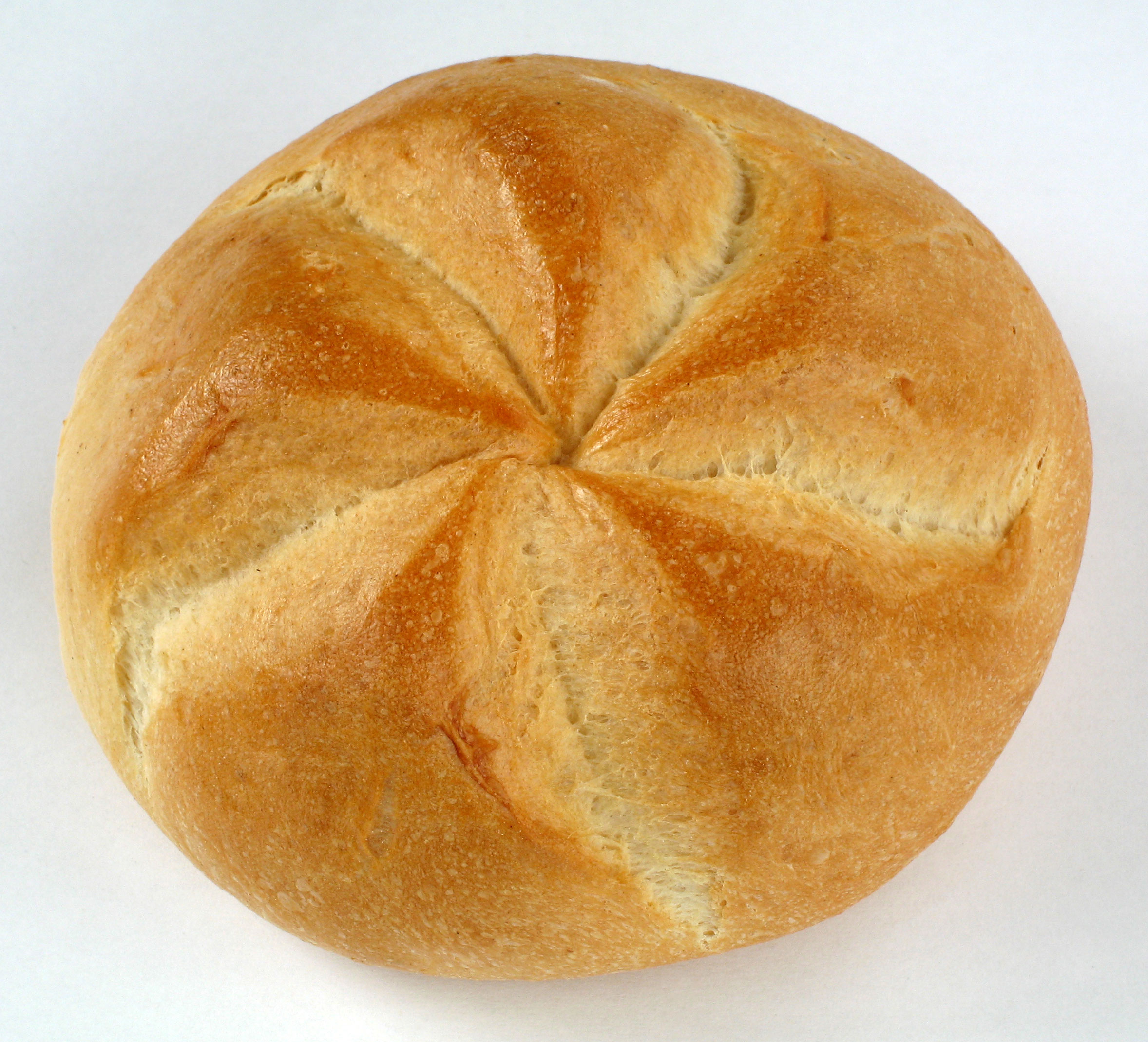
- Alternative names: Vienna roll, hard roll, water roll
- Type: Bread roll
- Place of origin: Austria
- Region or state: Vienna
- Main ingredients: Flour, barm, malt, water, salt
- Variations: Michetta, rosetta
- Food energy (per serving): 200 (100 g)
- Other information: glycaemic load 40 (100 g)

The Kaiser roll (Austrian German: Kaisersemmel, Bavarian: Kaisersemmel, German: Kaiserbrötchen, "Emperor breadroll"; Slovene: kajzerica; Ukraine: Кайзерка Polish: kajzerka; Hungarian: császárzsemle; Ladin: śemel), also called a Vienna roll (Wiener Kaisersemmel), a hard roll or, if made by hand, also Handsemmel, is a typically round bread roll, originally from Austria. It is made from white flour, yeast, malt, water and salt, with the top side usually divided in a symmetric pattern of five segments, separated by curved superficial cuts radiating from the centre outward or folded in a series of overlapping lobes resembling a crown. The crisp Kaisersemmel is a traditional Austrian food officially approved by the Federal Ministry of Agriculture. According to the Codex Alimentarius Austriacus standards collection, a handmade Kaiser roll is known as a Wiener Kaisersemmel (Handsemmel) .

== Origin ==
It is sometimes claimed that kaiser rolls were named to honor Emperor (Kaiser) Franz Joseph I of Austria (born 1830, reigned 1848–1916); but the term appears in writing at least as early as 1825.

There is also the theory that the name stems at least in part from a baker family called Kayzer in Opatów in Galicia which had been occupied by the Austrian monarchy in the First Partition of Poland. Others attribute the invention to a Viennese baker named Kayser and date it to around 1730. The additional cuts on the top resulted in a somewhat higher proportion of flavor-enhancing crust, which customers liked.

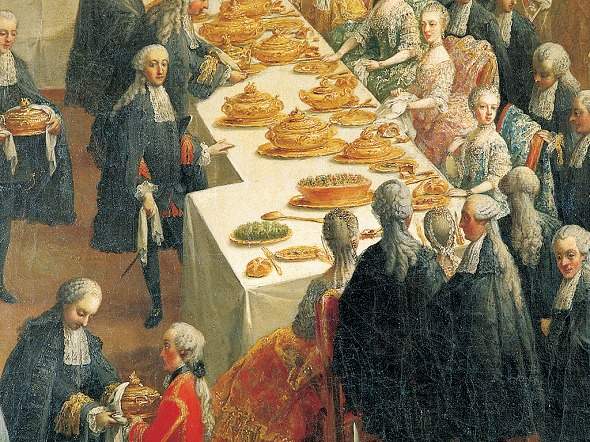
Kaiser rolls at a court banquet of Maria Theresa about 1760, detail from a painting by Martin van Meytens

Yet another theory connects the name to an 18th-century law that fixed retail prices of Semmeln (bread rolls) in the Habsburg monarchy. As this claim goes, the name Kaisersemmel came into general use after the bakers' guild sent a delegation in 1789 to Emperor Joseph II (b. 1741, r. 1765–1790) and persuaded him to deregulate the price of bread rolls.

The apocryphal sources for the name thus cluster in the mid-late 18th century, around times of Joseph II and Francis I; by the early 19th century the name had been established. Meanwhile, the type of bun nowadays known as Kaisersemmel seems to go back at least to roughly the same time: bread rolls which look quite like the modern version are served, one to the left of each plate, in a Martin van Meytens painting depicting a court dinner in the Great Antechamber of the Hofburg palace, held sometime in the 1760s.

With its monarchical connotation, Kaiser rolls stood out against common rolls known as Mundsemmeln ("mouth rolls") or Schustersemmeln ("cobbler's rolls"). They are traditionally found in Austria, but have also become popular in other countries of the former Austrian Habsburg Empire, such as the Galicia region in Poland and later the whole country (where it is known as kajzerka), Croatia, Slovenia, and Serbia (kajzerica), Hungary (császárzsemle), the Czech Republic (císařská žemle, císařská houska, kaiserka) and Slovakia (kaiserka), as well as in Germany, the United States, and Canada. During Austrian rule in Lombardy, Italian bakers produced a hollow version known as michetta or rosetta.

== Variations ==
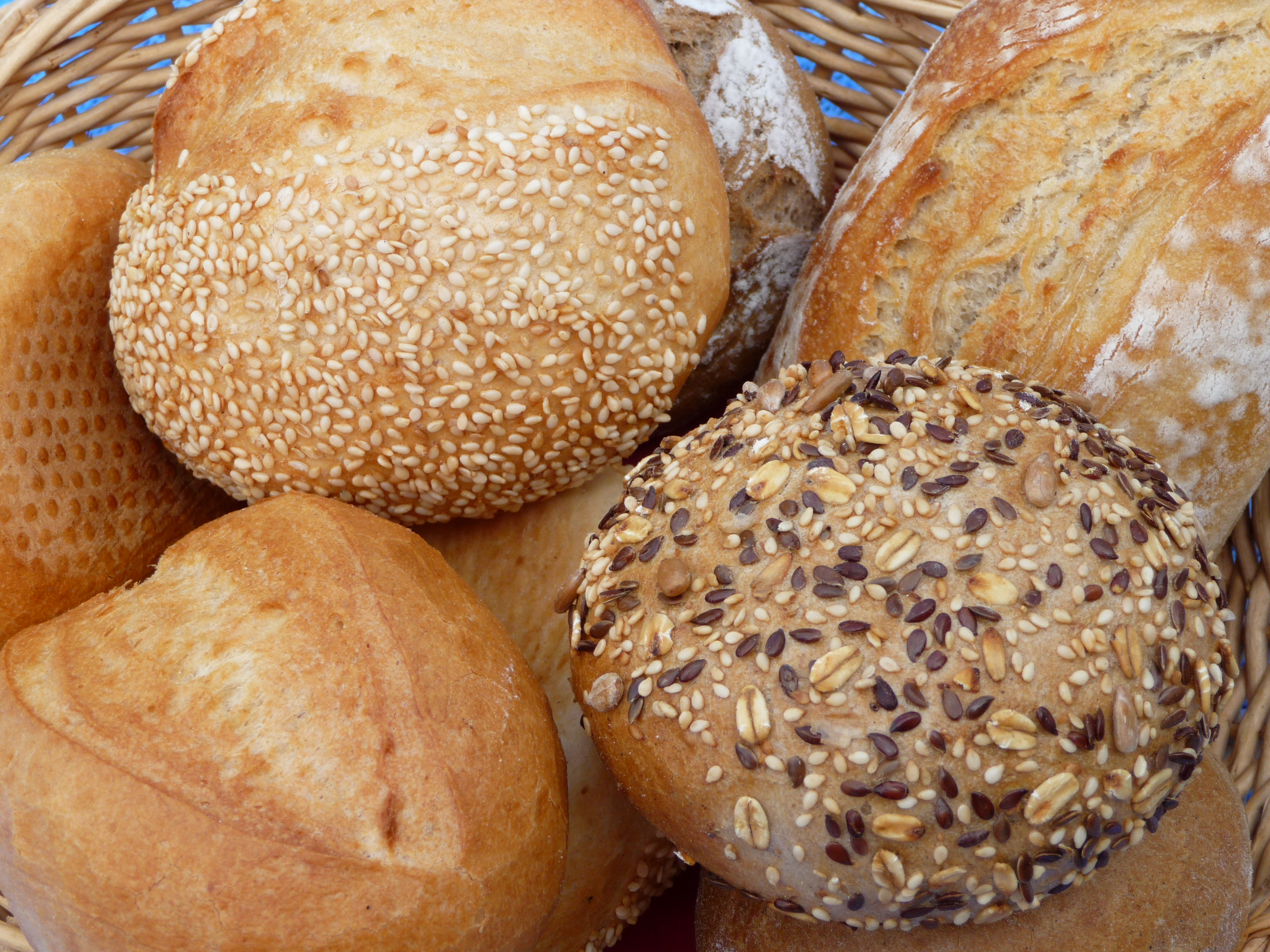
Assortment of different German style Brötchen

There are multiple variants of the common roll, differing in size, type of flour used, and toppings. While traditionally plain, Kaiser-style rolls are today found topped with poppy seeds, sesame seeds, pumpkin seeds, flax, or sunflower seeds. The Kaiser roll is a main part of a typical Austrian breakfast, usually served with butter and jam. It is often used as a bun for such popular sandwiches as hamburgers in America, and with a slice of Leberkäse in Germany and in Austria, though sliced Extrawurst and pickled gherkins (Wurstsemmel), or a type of Wiener schnitzel (Schnitzelsemmel) are also used.

Other similar hard rolls are known as Brötchen in Germany and Austria. A variation called a kümmelweck (alternatively spelled "kimmelweck" or "kummelweck") is topped with kosher salt and caraway, and in the United States is an essential component of a Buffalo-area specialty, the beef on weck sandwich. "Weck" is short for "Weckerl", the diminutative of "Wecken", a loaf of bread, "Kümmel" is caraway.

In much of eastern New York State—New York City, Long Island, the Hudson and Mohawk Valleys, and the Adirondacks—and throughout New Jersey, Pennsylvania, Maryland, Delaware, and Connecticut, Kaiser rolls are known as "hard rolls", or "rolls", and are staples of delicatessen and convenience stores. Hard rolls are the bread traditionally used to make the Bacon, egg and cheese sandwich in New York.

The Wisconsin variety of "hard roll", which was formed over the decades by the bakeries of Sheboygan to be paired with the local specialty of bratwurst (either in a long single bun or circular "double brat" roll), features a fluffy consistency on the inside with a crust on the crown of the bun, though most of the steps and some ingredients in the creation of Sheboygan hard rolls are proprietary, and can vary by each bakery's own recipe.

== Gallery ==
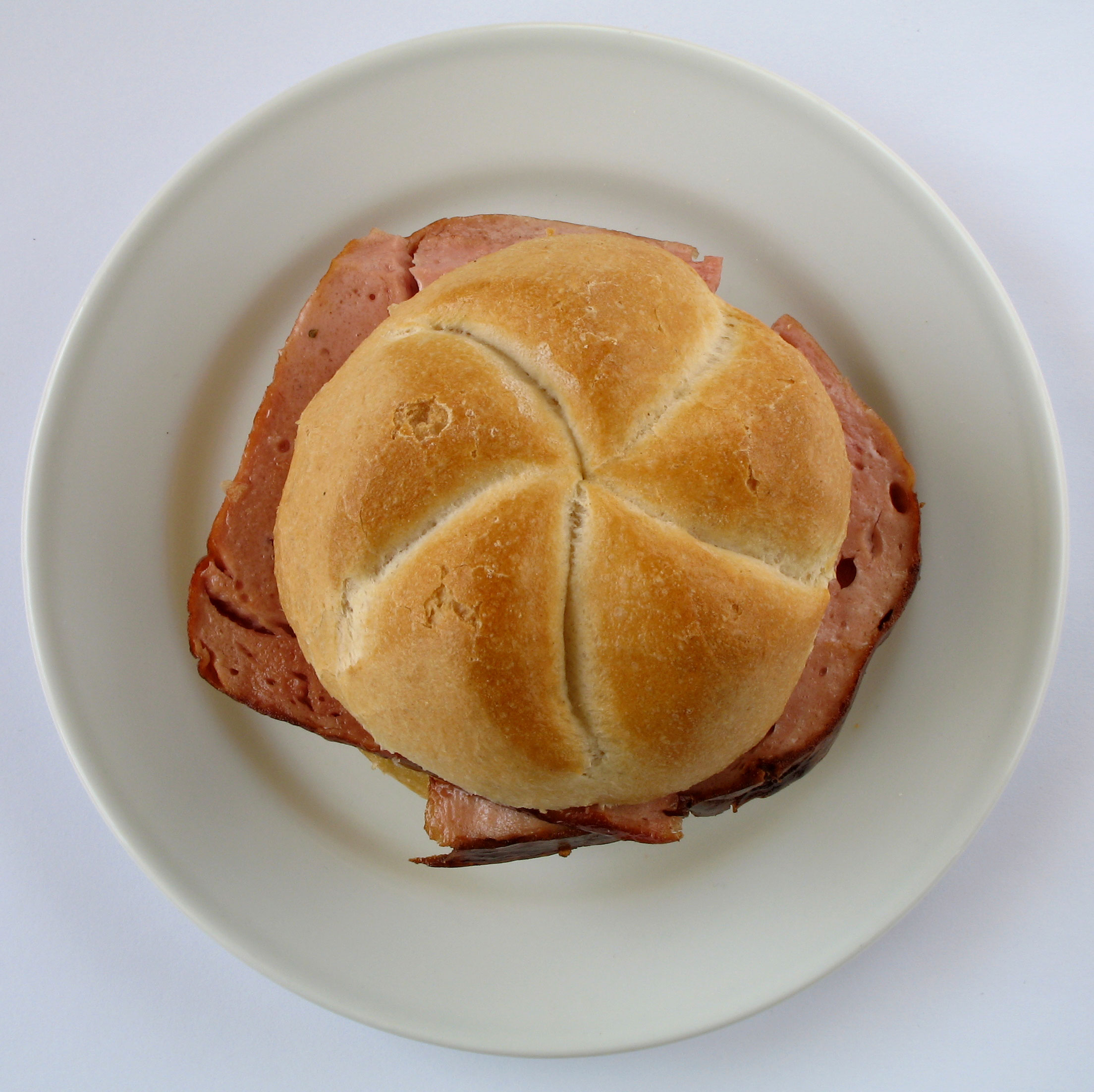
Leberkäsesemmel

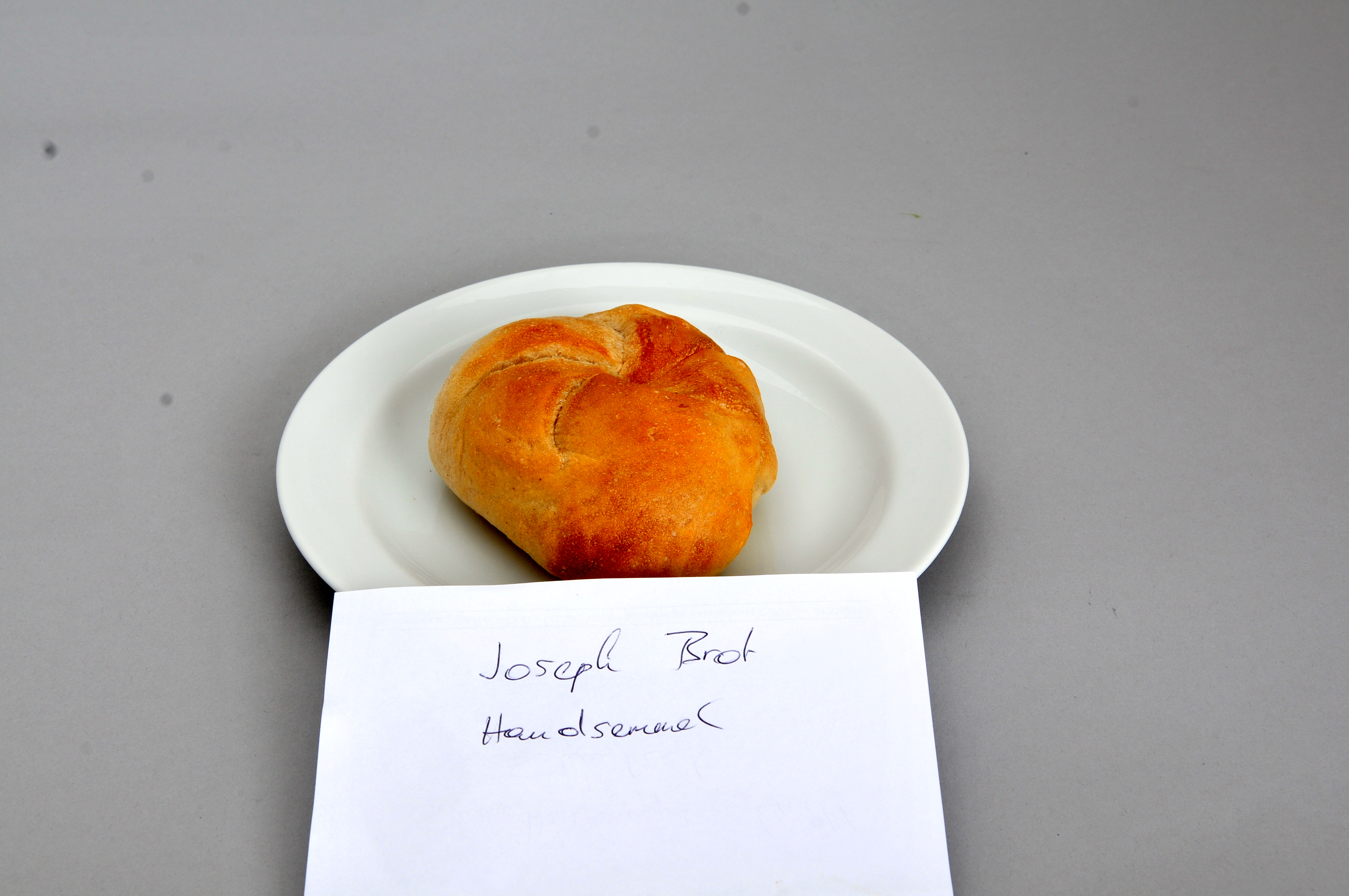
Handsemmel

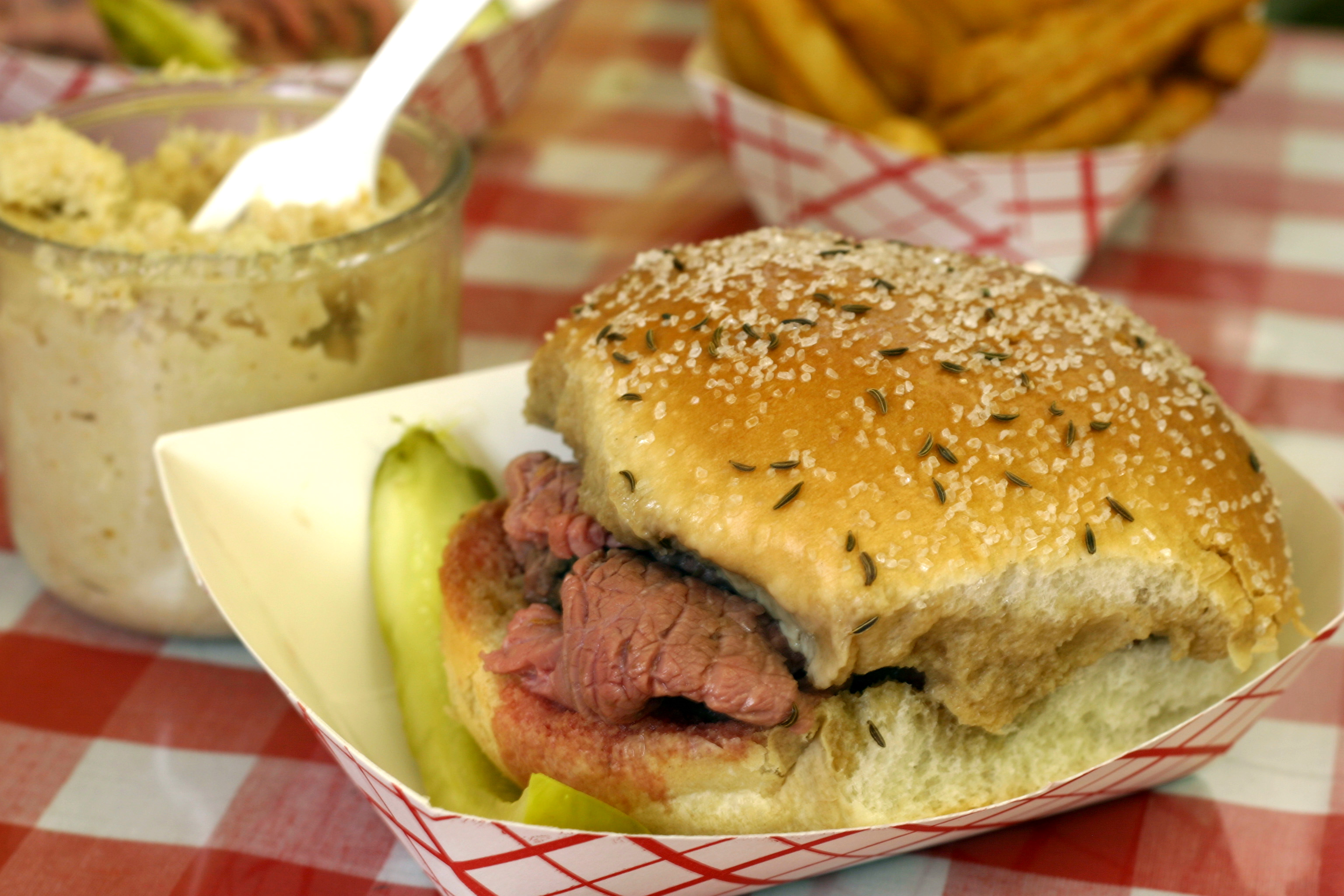
A beef on weck sandwich

== See also ==
- Austrian cuisine
- Central European cuisine
- List of bread rolls
- Vienna bread
