= Roast beef =

Traditional English dish of beef which is roasted

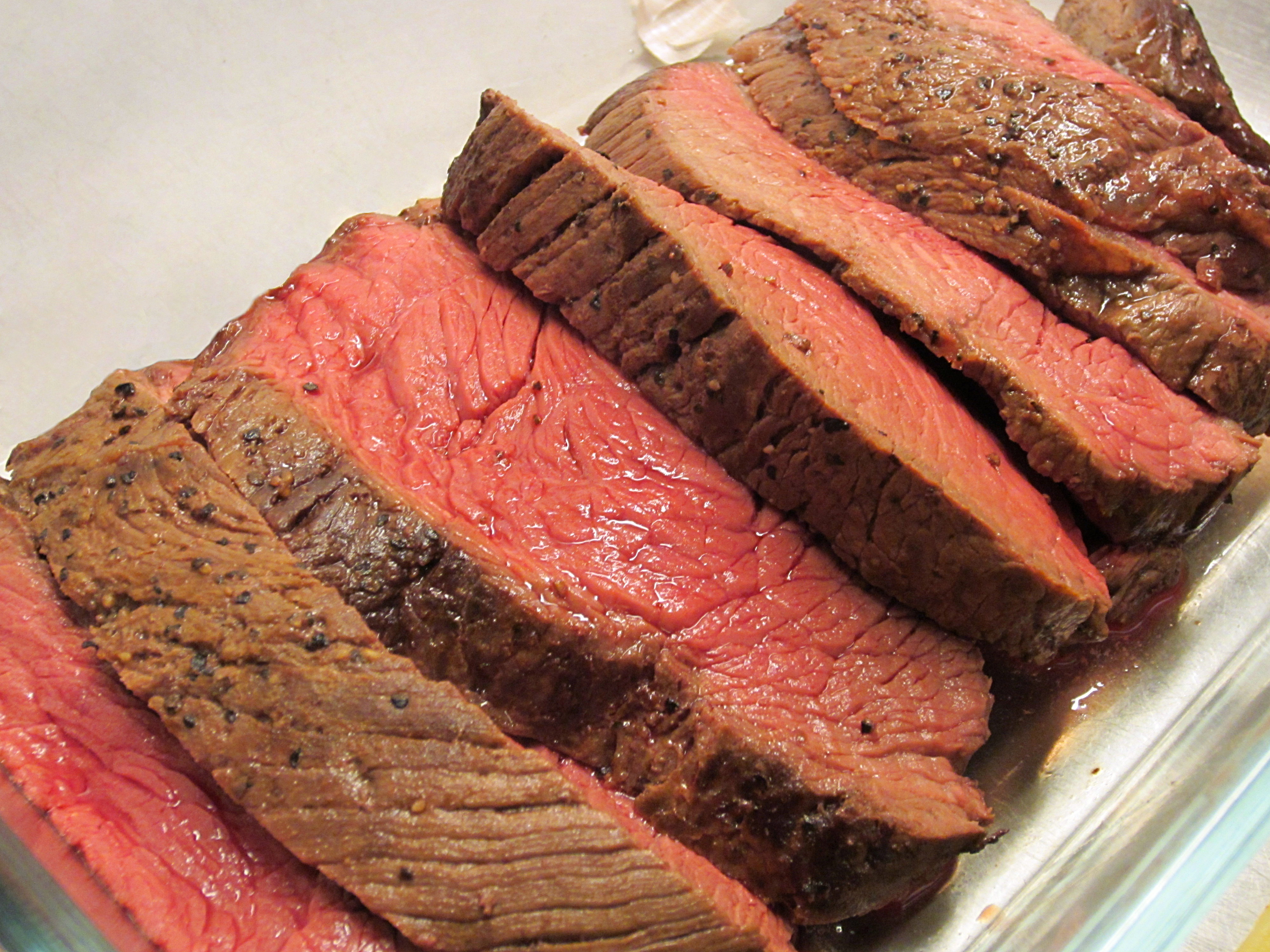
- Slices of roast beef
- Course: Main course
- Place of origin: United Kingdom
- Region or state: England
- Serving temperature: Hot or cold
- Main ingredients: Beef

Roast beef is a dish of beef that is roasted, generally served as the main dish of a meal. In the Anglosphere, roast beef is one of the meats often served at Sunday lunch or dinner. Yorkshire pudding is a standard side dish. Sliced roast beef is also sold as a cold cut, and used as a sandwich filling. Leftover roast beef may be minced and made into hash.

Roast beef is a characteristic national dish of England and holds cultural meaning for the English dating back to the 1731 ballad "The Roast Beef of Old England". The dish is so synonymous with England and its cooking methods from the 18th century that a French nickname for the English is les rosbifs.

== Culinary arts ==
The beef on weck sandwich is a tradition in western New York dating back to the late 1800s. Roast beef is sometimes served with horseradish or horseradish sauce. In Denmark, it is mostly used in open sandwiches, called smørrebrød.

== Roast beef sandwich ==
In the UK the roast beef sandwich is often served hot with fried onions, gravy and horseradish sauce. When it is served cold it consists of bread, cold roast beef, lettuce or rocket, tomatoes and horseradish sauce or mustard.

== Gallery ==
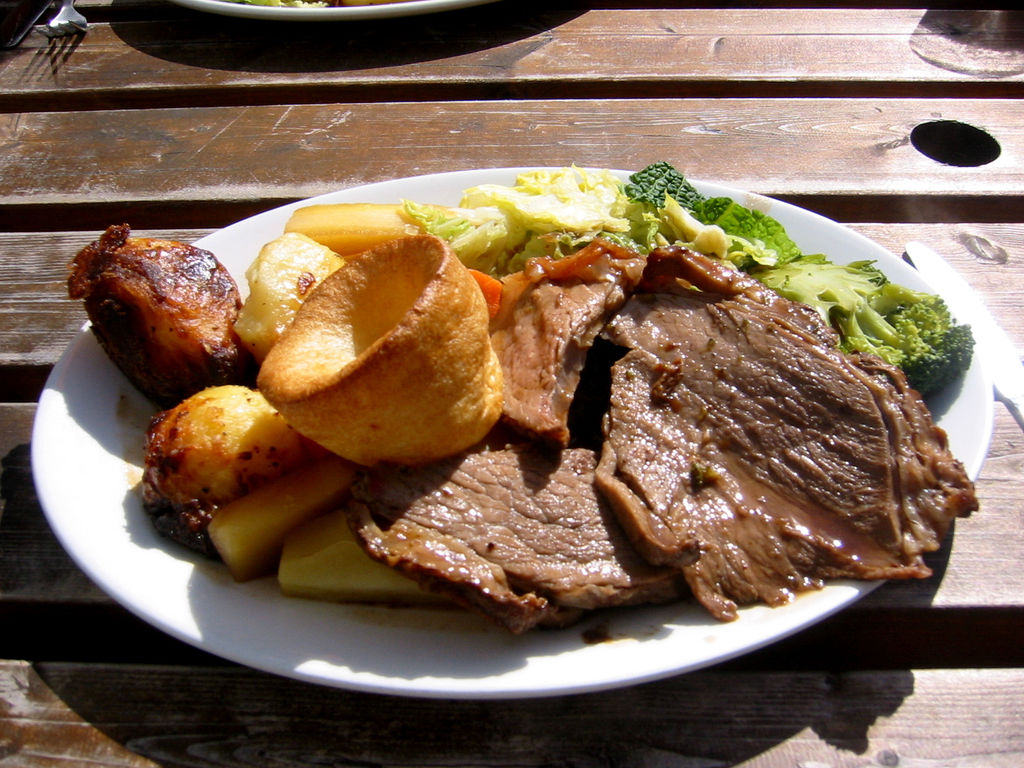
Sunday roast consisting of roast beef, roast potatoes, vegetables, and Yorkshire pudding

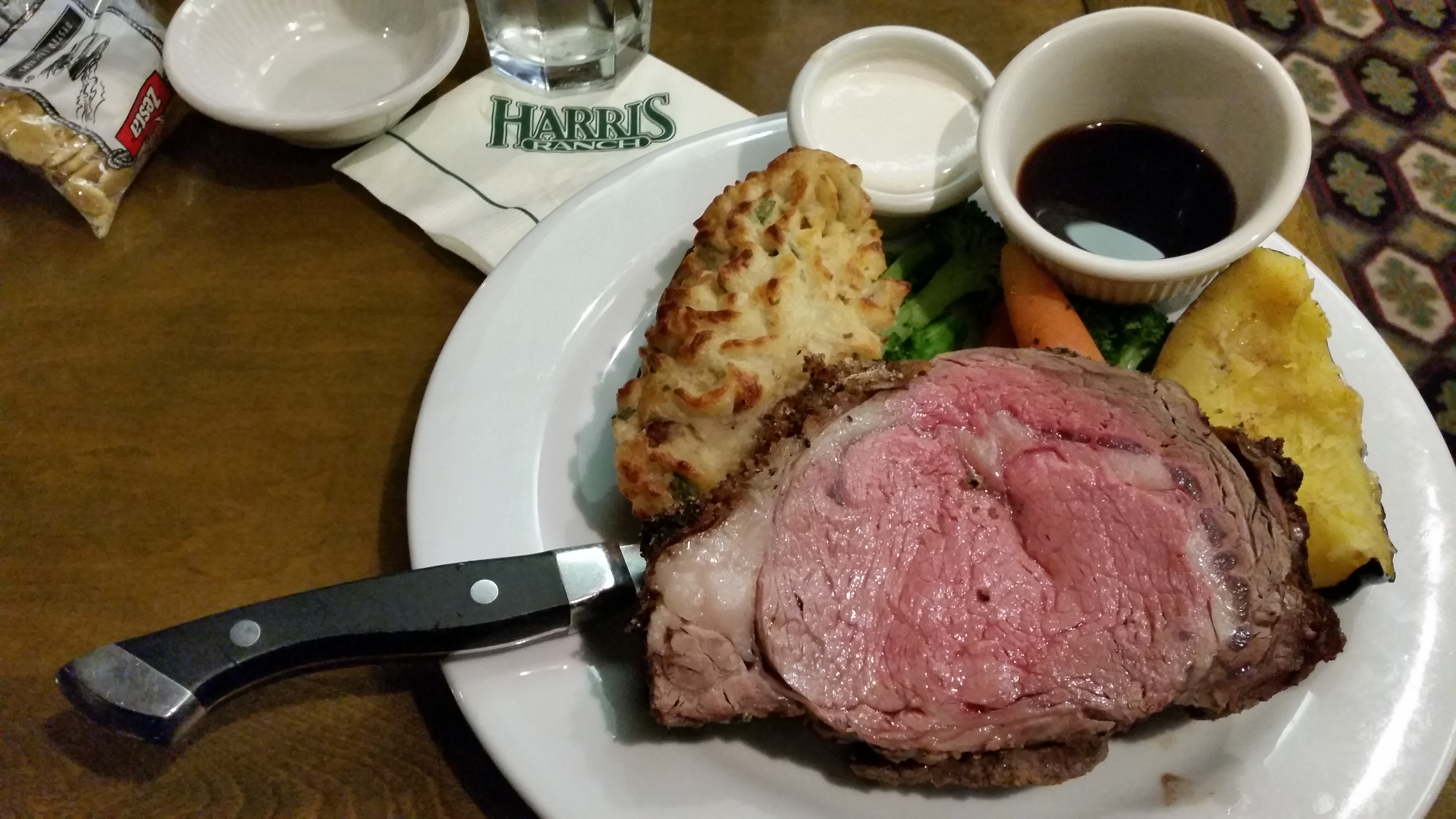
Some prefer roast beef to be served "medium"

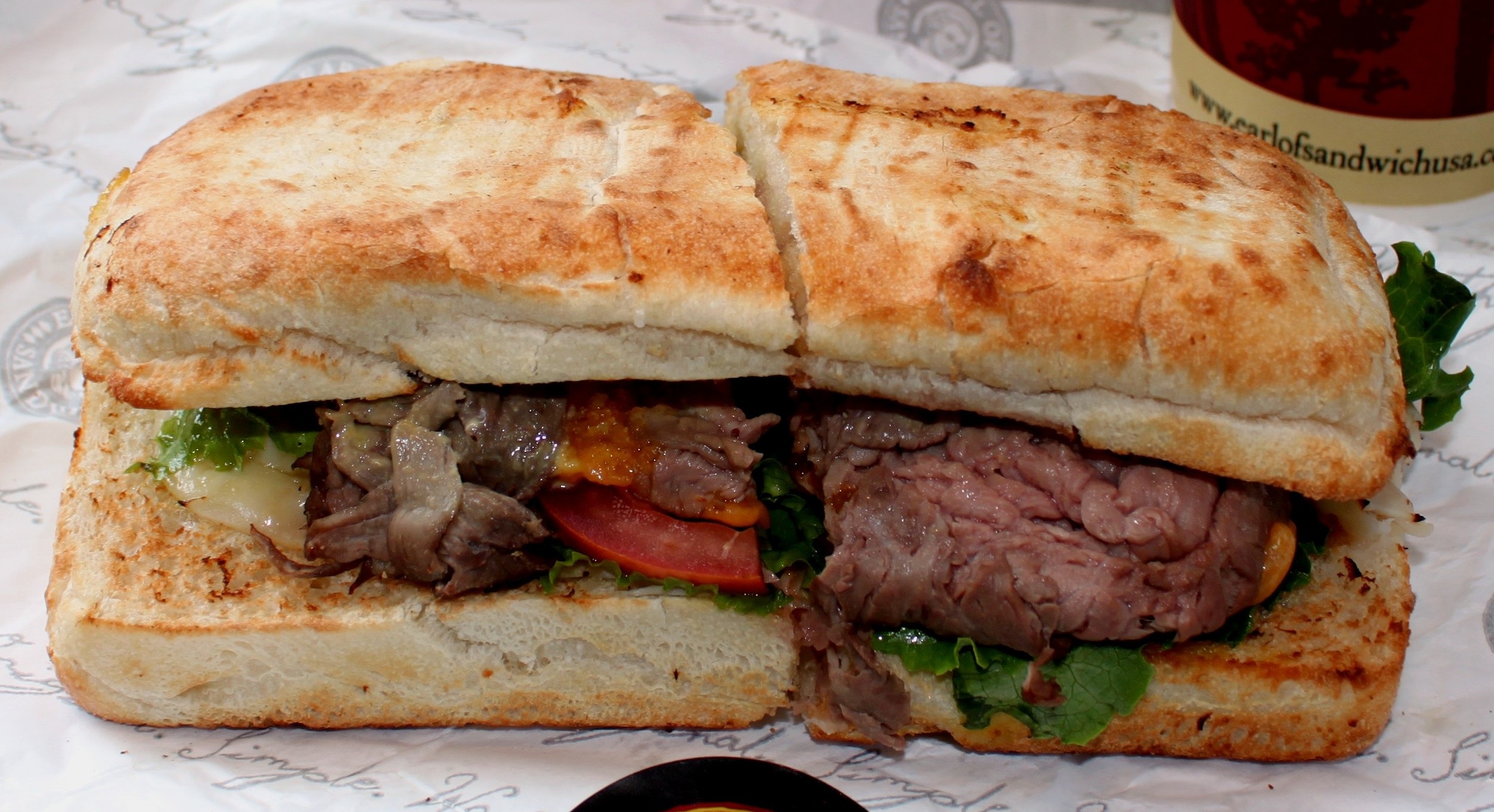
Roast beef sandwich

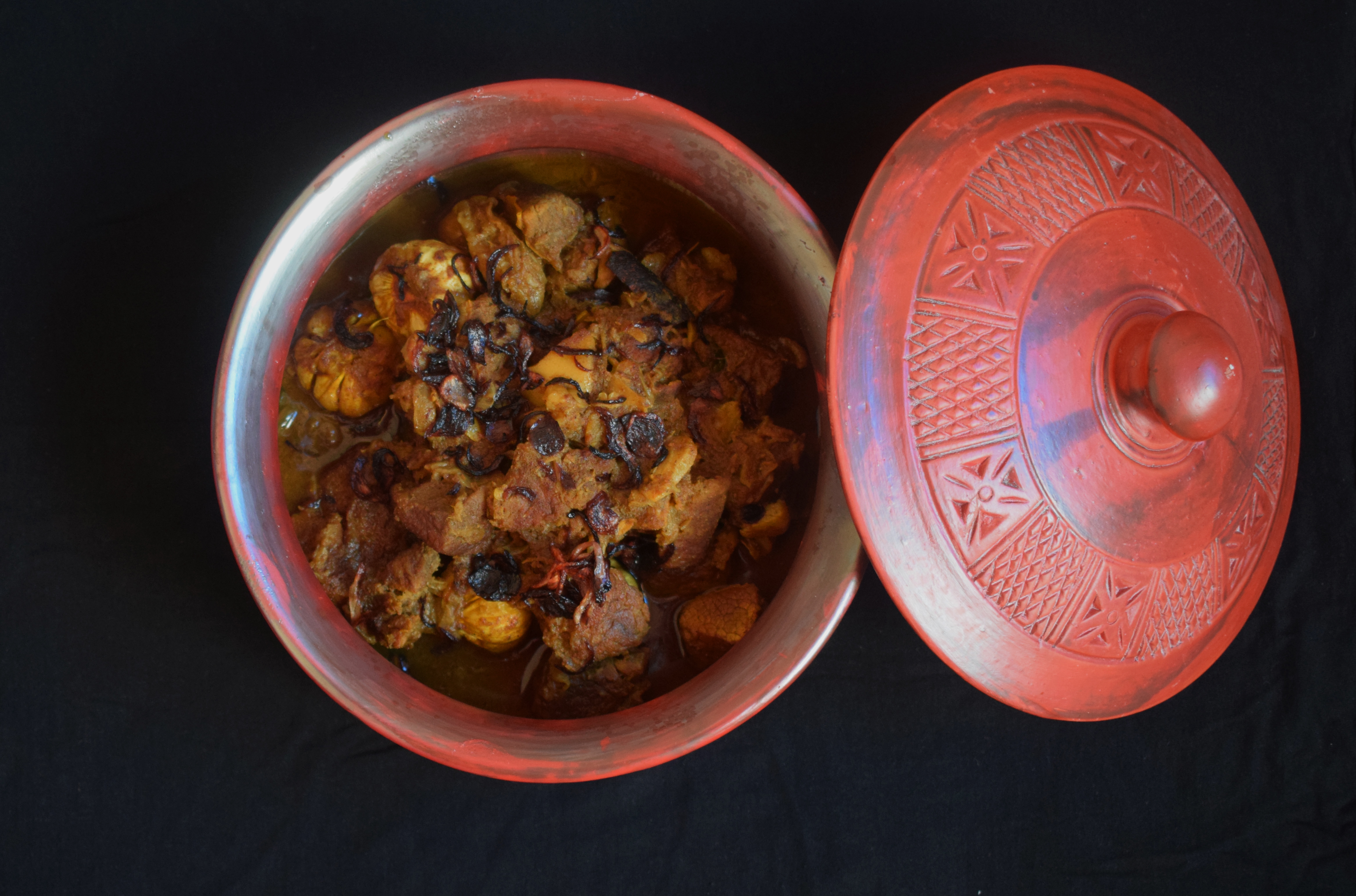
Roast beef
