= Bill Binder =

American businessman

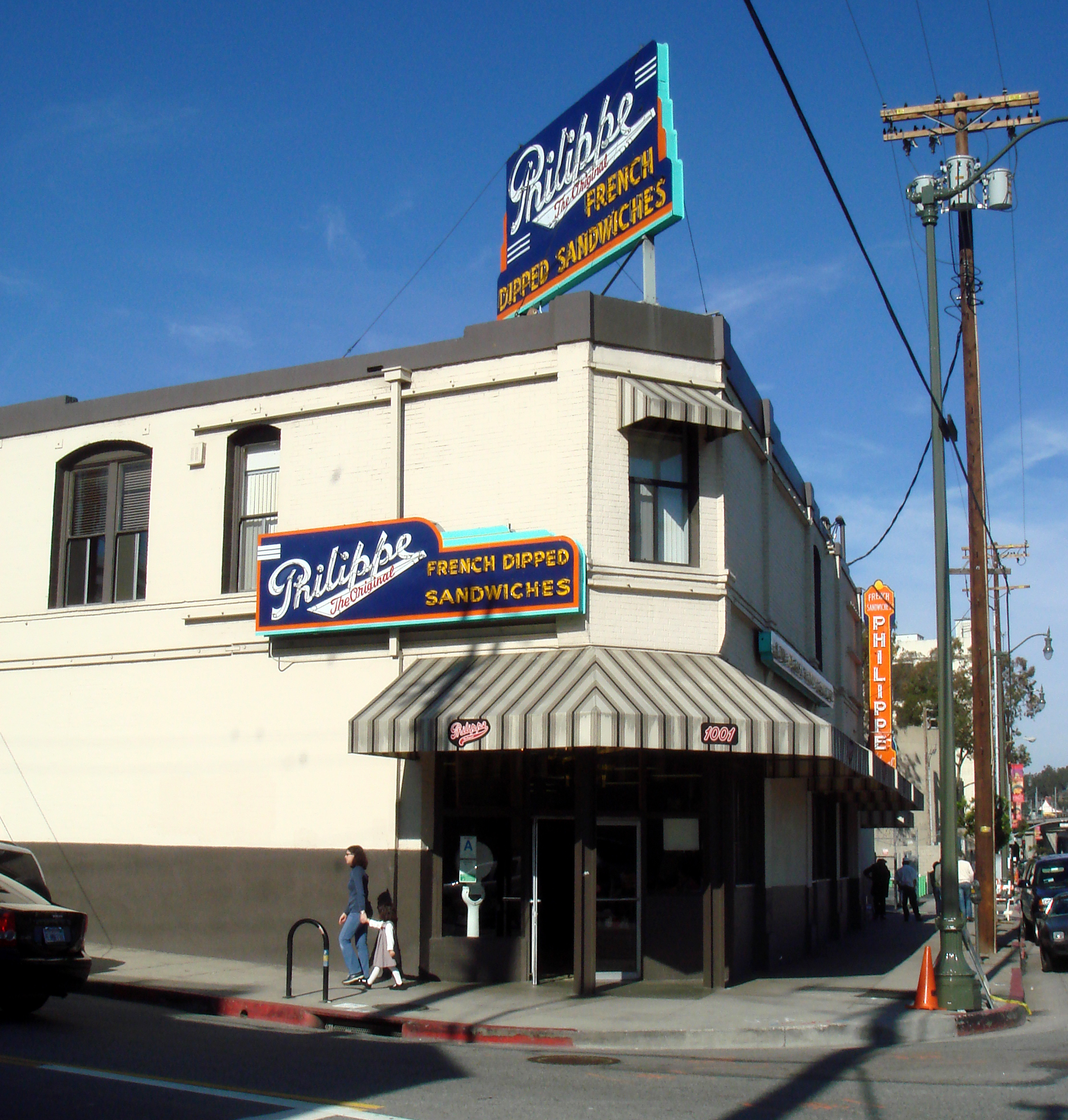
Philippe's in downtown Los Angeles, which Binder ran until 1985.

William Otto Binder (February 28, 1915 – January 28, 2010) was an American restaurateur and businessman who ran the landmark Philippe's restaurant, known as Philippe the Original, downtown Los Angeles for decades. Philippe's, a major destination for locals and tourists, is famous for its French dip sandwiches, which are said to have been invented at Philippe's, and sawdust covered floors.

== Biography ==
=== Early life ===
Bill Binder was born in Milwaukee, Wisconsin, on February 28, 1915. His father, a brewer for the Miller Brewing Company, graduated from the Wahl-Henius Brewing Institute in Chicago.

He moved with his family from their home in Chicago to southern California. Binder graduated from Calexico High School in 1933. He enlisted in the United States Marines during World War II in 1941, and served on the Solomon Islands. He was honorably discharged as a captain in the Marines in 1945, but remained in the United States Marine Corps Reserve until 1951, when he retired with the rank of major.

=== Philippe's ===
In 1944, while still in the Marines, Binder married his wife, Beverly Martin. Her father, Frank Martin, and uncles, Harry and David Martin, had purchased Philippe's restaurant in Los Angeles from its founder and original owner, Philippe Mathieu, in 1927. Bill and Beverly had met at Frank's Place, a cafe owned by her father, located directly across the street from the Eastside Brewery, where Binder worked at the time.

The couple moved from California to Hancock, Michigan, after their wedding, where Binder worked as a brewer. However, after just a few months in Michigan they returned to Los Angeles.

Binder owned and operated a coffee shop in Los Angeles. After several years, Binder began working with his father-in-law at Philippe's following the death of Harry Martin. The family was forced to leave Philippe's original location on Aliso Street due to the construction of the Hollywood Freeway. They reopened Philippe's at its present location on Alameda Street near Olvera Street and Union Station in 1951.

Frank Martin persuaded Binder to run Philippe's at its new location. Binder kept the restaurant's menu virtually the same, focusing on its famous French dip sandwiches, which uses roast beef, ham, roast pork, lamb or turkey on a French roll, dipped in au jus.

=== Later life ===
Bill Binder retired in 1985, turning Philippe's over to his sons, John Binder and Richard Binder, who continue to run the restaurant as of February 2010. The brothers added new menu items, such as salads and turkey sandwiches, after Binder's retirement, though he continued to eat breakfast at Philippe's frequently.

Bill Binder died at a nursing facility in Pasadena, California, on January 28, 2010, at the age of 94. He was survived by his sons, John and Richard, who continue to run Philippe's; his daughter, Kathleen Binder Halstead, 10 grandchildren and 12 great-grandchildren. His wife, Beverly, died in 2001. His memorial service was held at St. Therese Catholic Church in Alhambra, California.
