= Philippe the Original =

Restaurant in Los Angeles, California

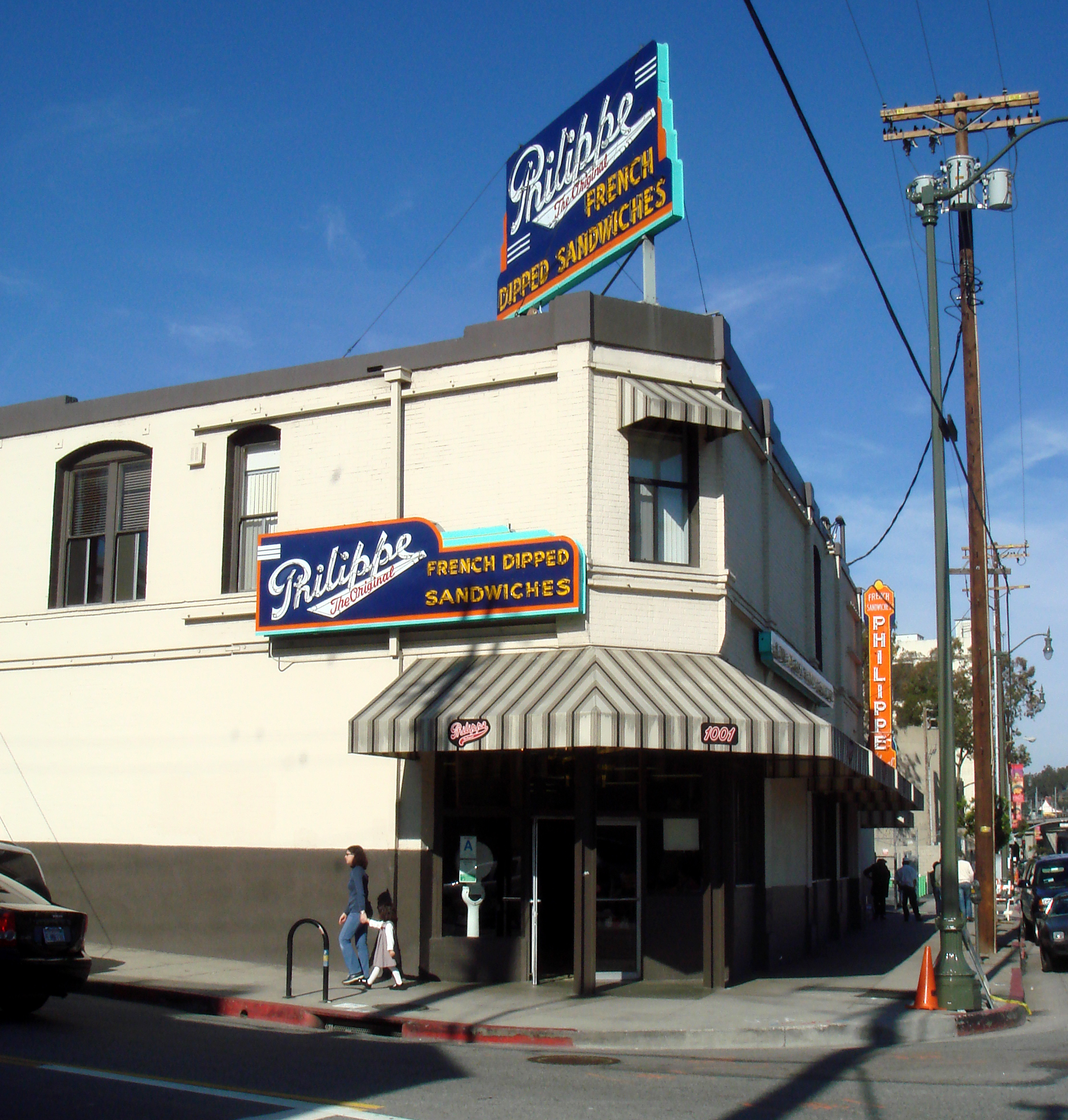
- Main entrance
- Interactive map of Philippe the Original

Restaurant information
- Established: 1908; 118 years ago
- Owners: Martin and Binder families
- Food type: French dip sandwiches
- Dress code: Casual
- Location: 1001 N. Alameda Street, Los Angeles, California, 90012, United States
- Coordinates: 34.059588°N 118.236896°W
- Reservations: No
- Website: www.philippes.com

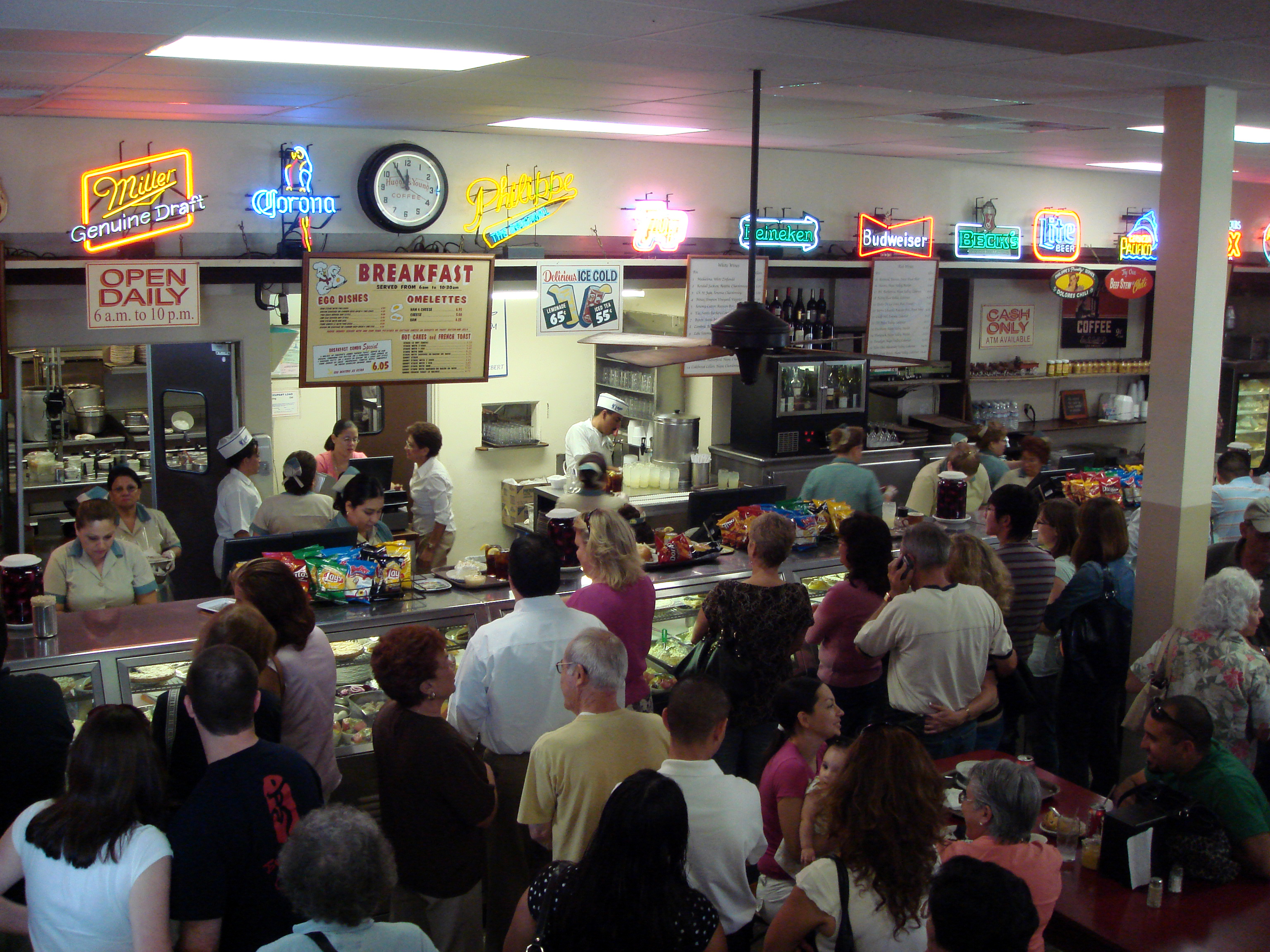
The weekday lunch rush at Philippe's

"Philippe the Original", commonly known as Philippe's (/fɪˈliːps/ fi-LEEPS) is a restaurant located in downtown Los Angeles, California. The restaurant is well known for continuously operating since 1908, making it one of the oldest restaurants in Los Angeles. It is also renowned for claiming to be the inventor of the French dip sandwich.

The restaurant has been located at 1001 North Alameda Street, on the edge of Chinatown, in the Historical District of Los Angeles, two blocks north of Olvera Street, and close to Union Station, since 1951.

== History ==
Philippe Mathieu emigrated from France to Buffalo, New York, in 1901, moving to Los Angeles in 1903. He opened a deli with his brother, Arbin, shortly after arriving. In 1908 he opened his first Philippe restaurant at 300 N. Alameda Street, where he served roast beef, roast pork, roast lamb, liver pâté and blood sausage. Mathieu's restaurants were in L.A.'s traditional Frenchtown neighborhood, which was razed to build Los Angeles City Hall.

In 1911, the Mathieu brothers opened the New Poodle Dog French Restaurant at 156 North Spring Street. The New Poodle was a white tablecloth restaurant, and after two years, they closed it and opened another inexpensive place at 617 North Alameda. In 1918, Philippe moved the restaurant to 246 Aliso Street, where he first served his French dipped sandwiches.

In 1925, to avoid frequent rent increases, Mathieu bought his own property at 364 Aliso Street. Two years later, he sold the restaurant to a lawyer whose name is unknown, who failed at running the restaurant. A few months later, in 1927, Mathieu bought back the restaurant and sold it to brothers David and Harry Martin, making good on his promise to his wife to retire at 50; Mathieu died in 1960 at the age of 72. The Martins and their in-laws the Binders have run Philippe's ever since. John and Richard Binder took over running the restaurant following the retirement of their father William "Bill" Binder in 1985.

From 1927 to 1941, Philippe's was open 24 hours a day. In 1951, the Martins moved Philippe's to its present location at 1001 N. Alameda Street due to the construction of the Hollywood Freeway.

Cole's Pacific Electric Buffet claims to have existed before Philippe's, but Cole's closed for renovations in March 2007 and reopened in December 2008. Philippe's claims to be the longest continuously operating restaurant in Los Angeles.

The restaurant is featured in Visiting... with Huell Howser Episode 413.

=== French dip sandwich ===
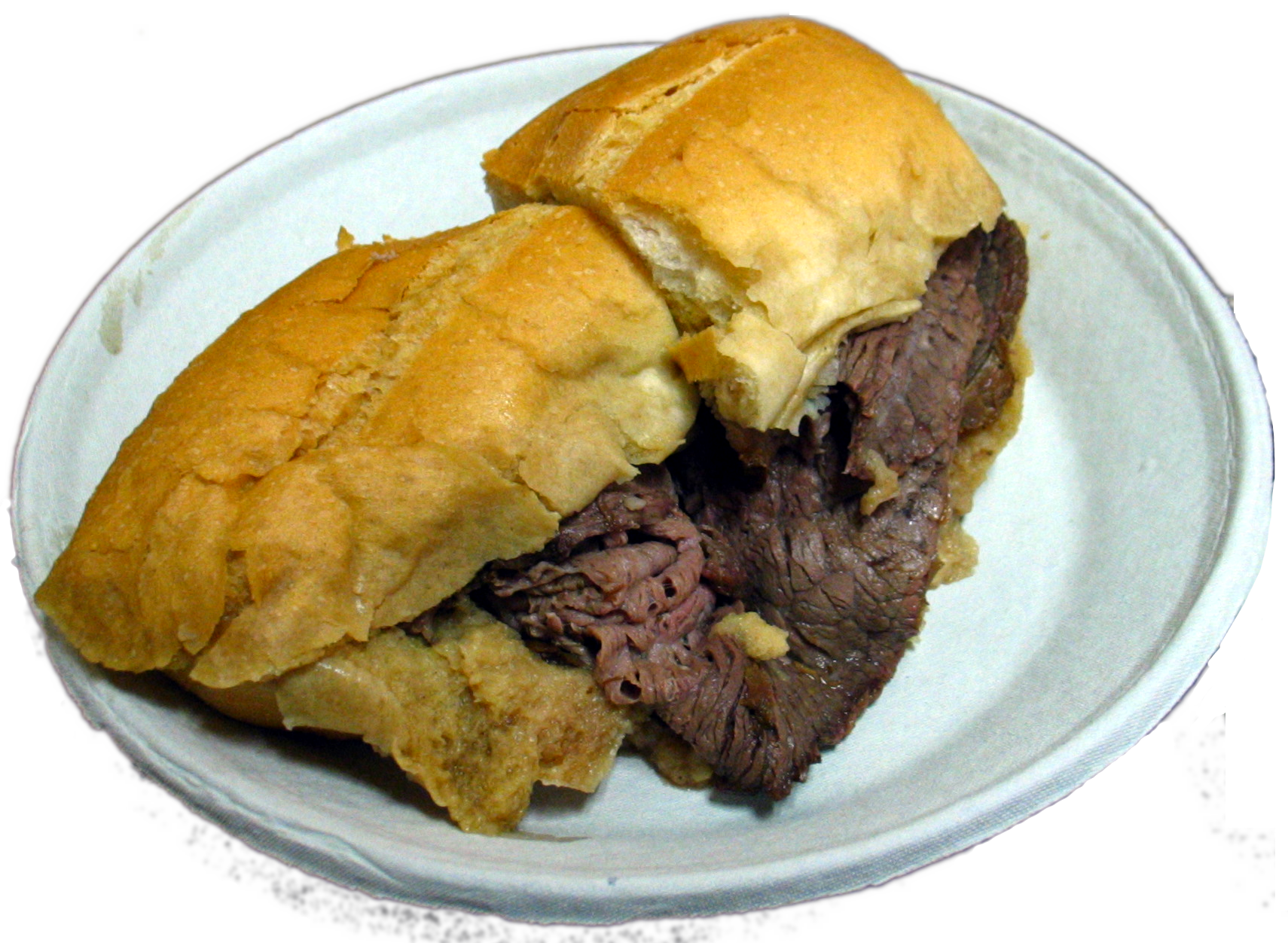
A Philippe's French dip

The origins of the French dip sandwich have been debated for many years. Cole's Pacific Electric Buffet also claims to have invented the sandwich in 1908. There are three versions of how Philippe's French dipped sandwich originated:

- In 1951, Mathieu told a Los Angeles Times reporter, "One day a customer saw some gravy in the bottom of a large pan of roast meat. He asked me if I would mind dipping one side of the French roll in that gravy. I did, and right away five or six others wanted the same." He quickly ran out of gravy. "But," he said, "it put me wise." The next day he had a gallon of gravy ready, but so many people wanted dip sandwiches that he still ran out.
- An alternative explanation bases the invention in frugality. A fireman came into the restaurant when there were leftover rolls, which Mathieu would use up, although they were stale. The fireman complained that the roll was dry, so Philippe dipped it in jus, basically to get rid of the customer. This alternative is plausible since Mathieu may have preferred to credit a customer rather than waste a stale roll.
- The most common story is that Mathieu accidentally dropped a roll in pan drippings, and the police officer who had ordered the sandwich agreed to eat it anyway. This explanation is less likely, since the "happy accident" theory of food origins is typically used when there is no alternative explanation.

Originally, Mathieu referred to this as a dip sandwich. The restaurant was colloquially known as "Frenchy's", which eventually developed into a "French dip sandwich".

== Menu ==
Philippe's is a traditional delicatessen-type sit-down restaurant, having old-fashioned traditions such as rows of tables shared by several parties, wood shavings scattered on the floor, dark brown wooden walls and floor, and newspapers from historical U.S. events that happened from the time the restaurant opened to the 1980s. Wall-mounted displays are dedicated to circuses, and to the history of railroading Los Angeles, from the Los Angeles Historical Railroad Society. The building has two stories, both with tables for eating, and is located one block away from Union Station. The skyscrapers of downtown are not visible from the restaurant (at street level), despite its proximity.

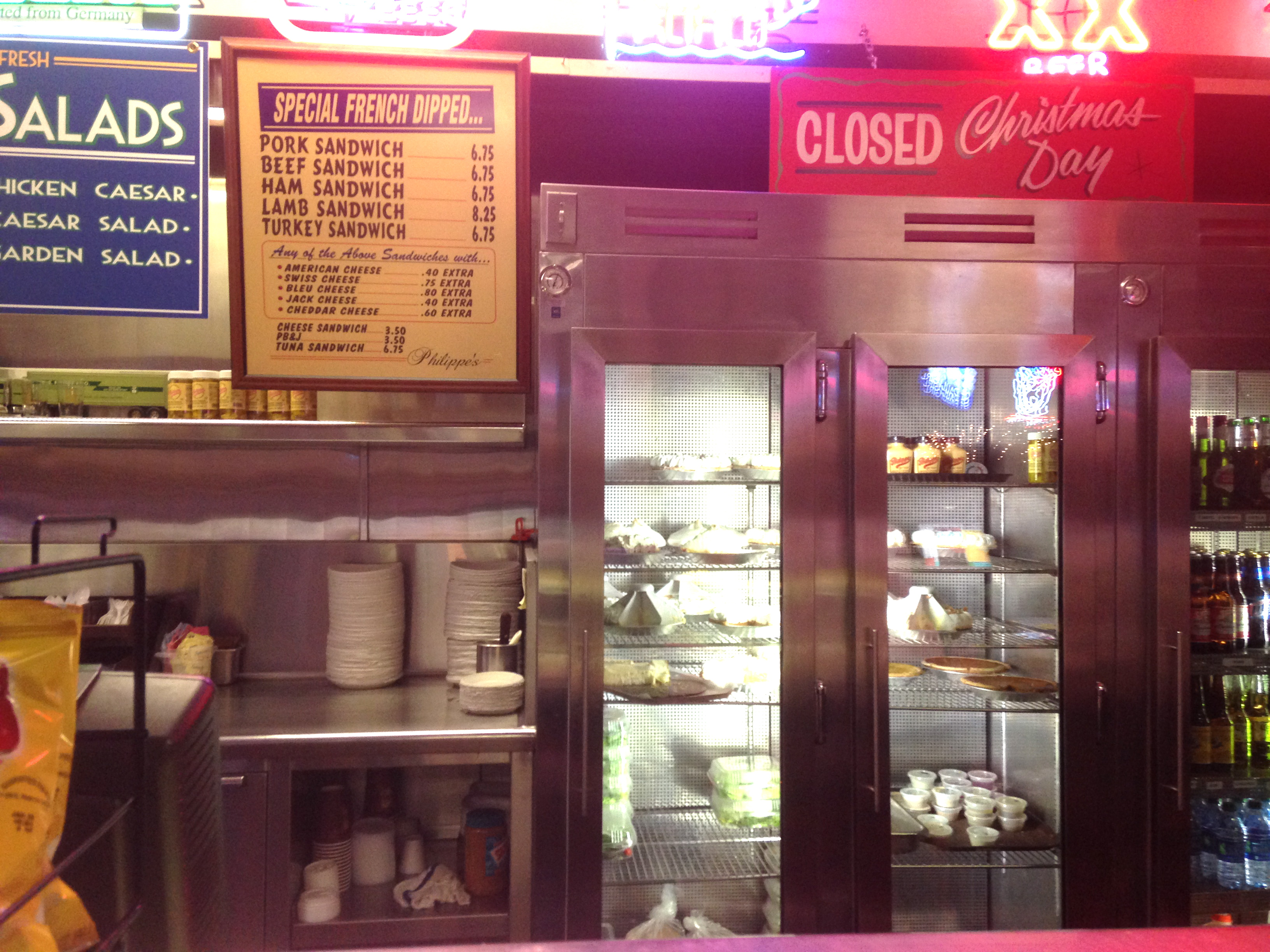
Behind the counter at Philippe's

The restaurant is famous for attracting patrons from all walks of life, from poverty-stricken, to working class, to the city's elites. At peak times, customers often find themselves standing in lines that can be ten deep as they wait for waitresses to prepare their meals at one of the serving stations at the restaurant's counter. Meals are served cafeteria-style on paper plates, and customers carry their food on trays to their tables. The egalitarian effect of the restaurant has been noted, as people from various economic strata bump elbows at the long communal tables and ask each other to pass the jars of Philippe's homemade mustard. In 2008 the Los Angeles Department of Public Health ordered the traditional mustard jars and spoons to be removed from the tables as unsanitary; after a brief controversy, the jars were replaced by plastic squeeze bottles, and the mustard was restored to the tables.

In addition to their main attraction of French dip sandwiches, other old-fashioned foods are served, including freshly made soups, beef stew, chili, baked apples, and pickled pigs' feet. Sides include potato salad, macaroni salad, and coleslaw. Jars of purple pickled eggs are arrayed on the counter. Healthier menu items, such as turkey sandwiches and salads, were added to the menu following Bill Binder's retirement in 1985.

Philippe's serves cans of soft drinks, freshly brewed iced tea, lemonade, coffee, select wines, and beer. Homemade wine was once available. The current owner, a wine aficionado, added a small selection of California wines to the menu. Philippe's was famous for serving cups of regular coffee for 9 cents, in honor of old-fashioned prices. On January 25, 2012, it was announced that on February 2 the price would be raised to 45 cents. Prior to this, the price was last raised from 5 cents in 1977.

On its 85th, 90th, 95th and 100th anniversaries, French dip sandwiches were sold for 10 cents and coffee for 5 cents for a few hours during its celebration.

== See also ==
- List of James Beard America's Classics
- Original Tommy's
- The Hat
