= Nickel Diner =

Restaurant in Los Angeles, California, U.S.

Coordinates: 34.045891°N 118.248799°W

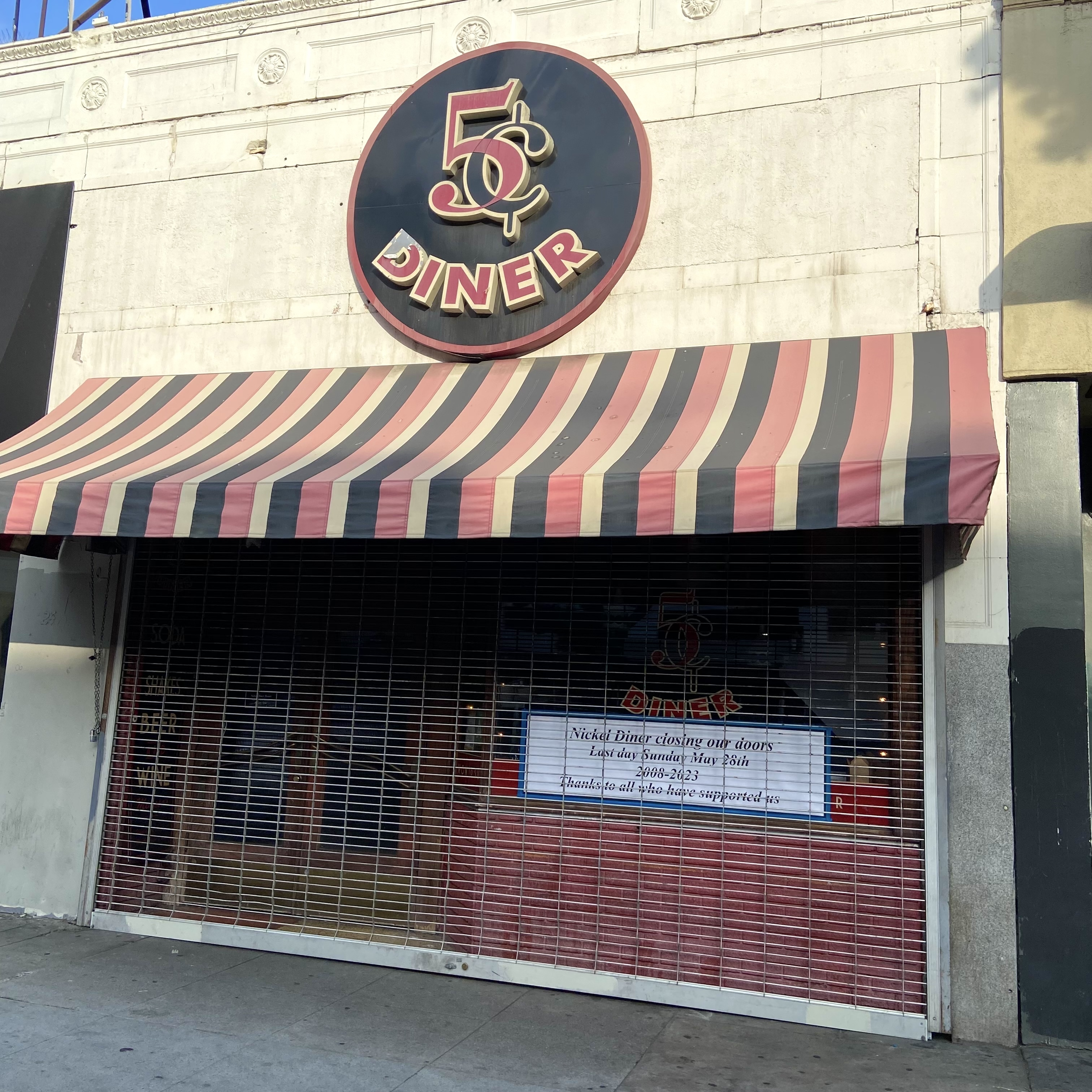
- Nickel Diner with closing notice - May 2023

Restaurant information
- Established: 2008
- Closed: May 28, 2023
- Location: Los Angeles, California
- Website: web.archive.org/web/20180302074145/http://nickeldiner.com/

Nickel Diner was a Los Angeles, California, restaurant known for its versions of diner food including dishes a maple-glaze bacon doughnut, baked eggs, steak sandwich, and catfish.

== Fixtures and fittings ==
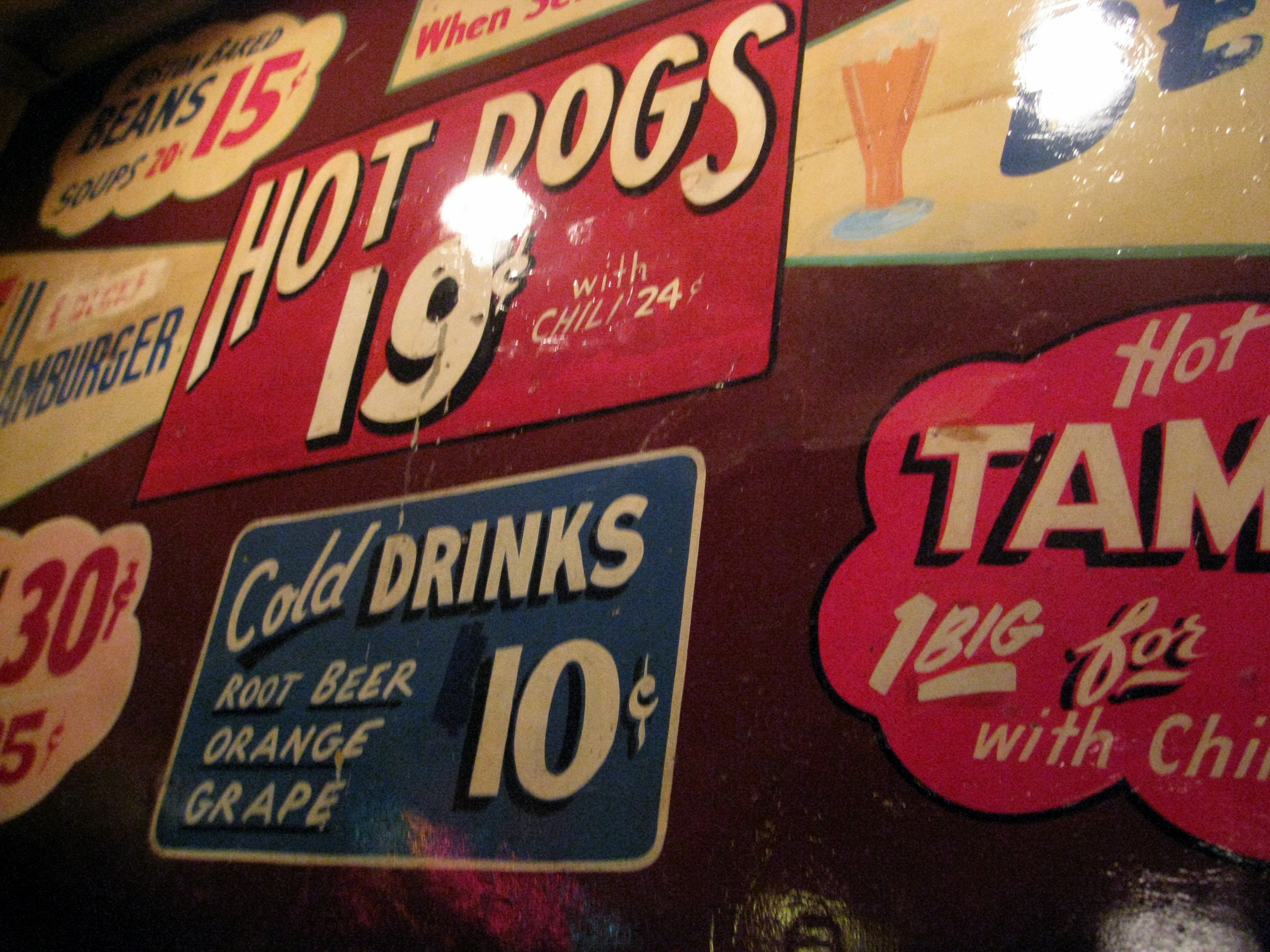
Interior wall of the Nickel Diner

The window was decorated with mannequin heads including a Marie Antoinette and TV chef Guy Fieri, who visited the restaurant in 2009 to film part of an episode of Diners, Drive-Ins and Dives. Some of the light fixtures were floor lamps glued upside down to the ceiling. The restaurant occupied the site of a long-forgotten diner, hand-painted wall menus with prices last current in the late 1940s.

== Critical praise ==
LA Weekly has described Nickel Diner as "an unlikely success", stepping from "what used to be considered the most notorious intersection in town".

The Los Angeles Times guide referred to the restaurant as a "trendy new diner", that is "located on a historic stretch of Main Street between Fifth and Sixth streets" and claimed that "[i]nside you're greeted with a picture-perfect model of a pre-WWII-era diner. High ceilings, vintage wallpaper, wooden tables, scuffed tile floors, cushy red leather booths and an old-school, lunch counter-style open kitchen make for a historically sentimental scene." and also say that "The Nickel dishes up a big helping of downtown L.A."

Los Angeles magazine named Nickel Diner as one of the three best restaurants in LA.

== Closure ==
The restaurant closed in 2023, with its last day of service May 28. Factors contributing to the closure included the COVID-19 pandemic, increasing costs due to inflation and the ending of pandemic era grants and other support, all coupled with an ongoing lack of business as downtown offices never fully returned to pre-pandemic occupancy levels.
