= Beef Wellington =

Steak dish

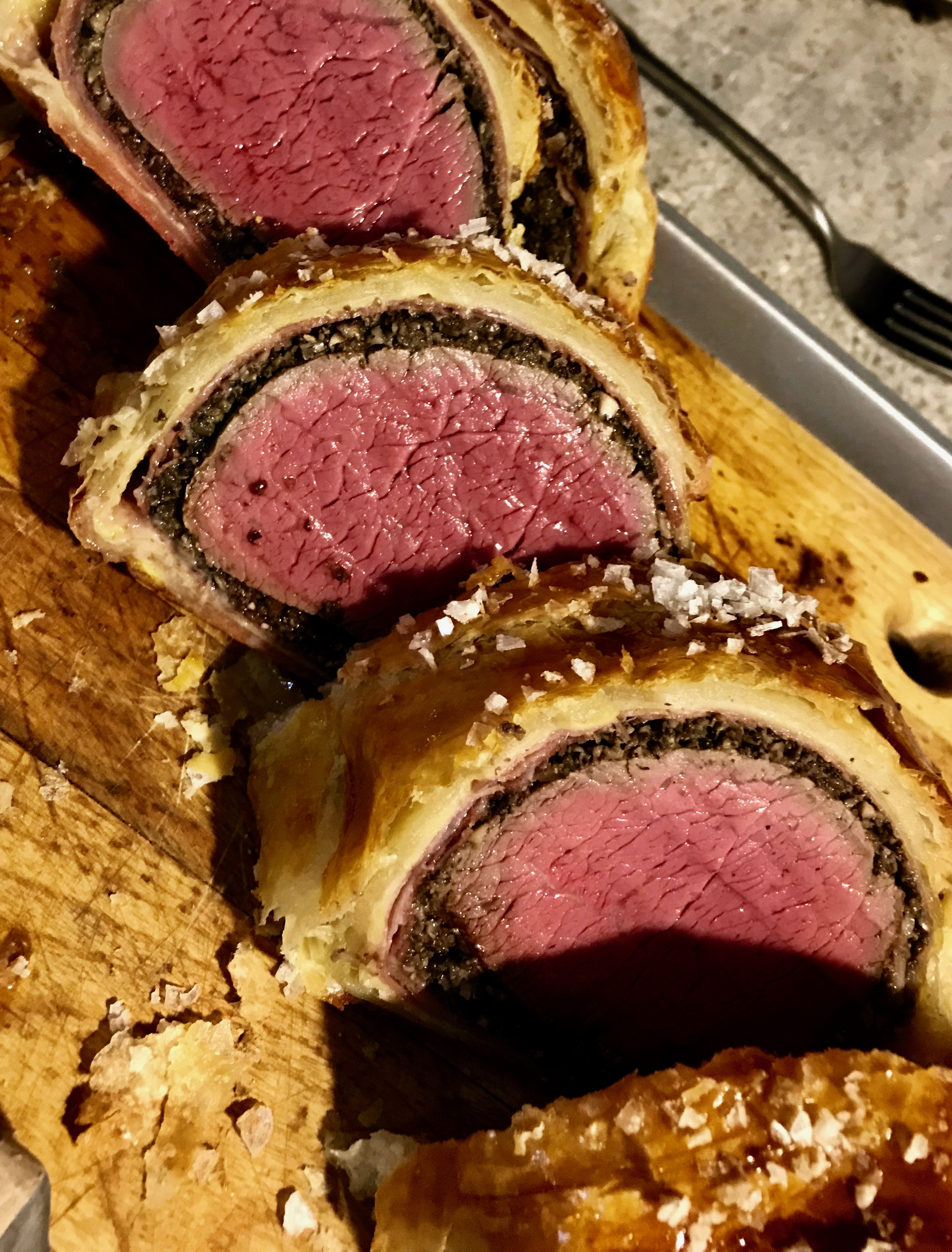
- Beef Wellington, sliced open
- Course: Main
- Place of origin: United Kingdom, England
- Serving temperature: Hot
- Main ingredients: Beef, puff pastry, duxelles

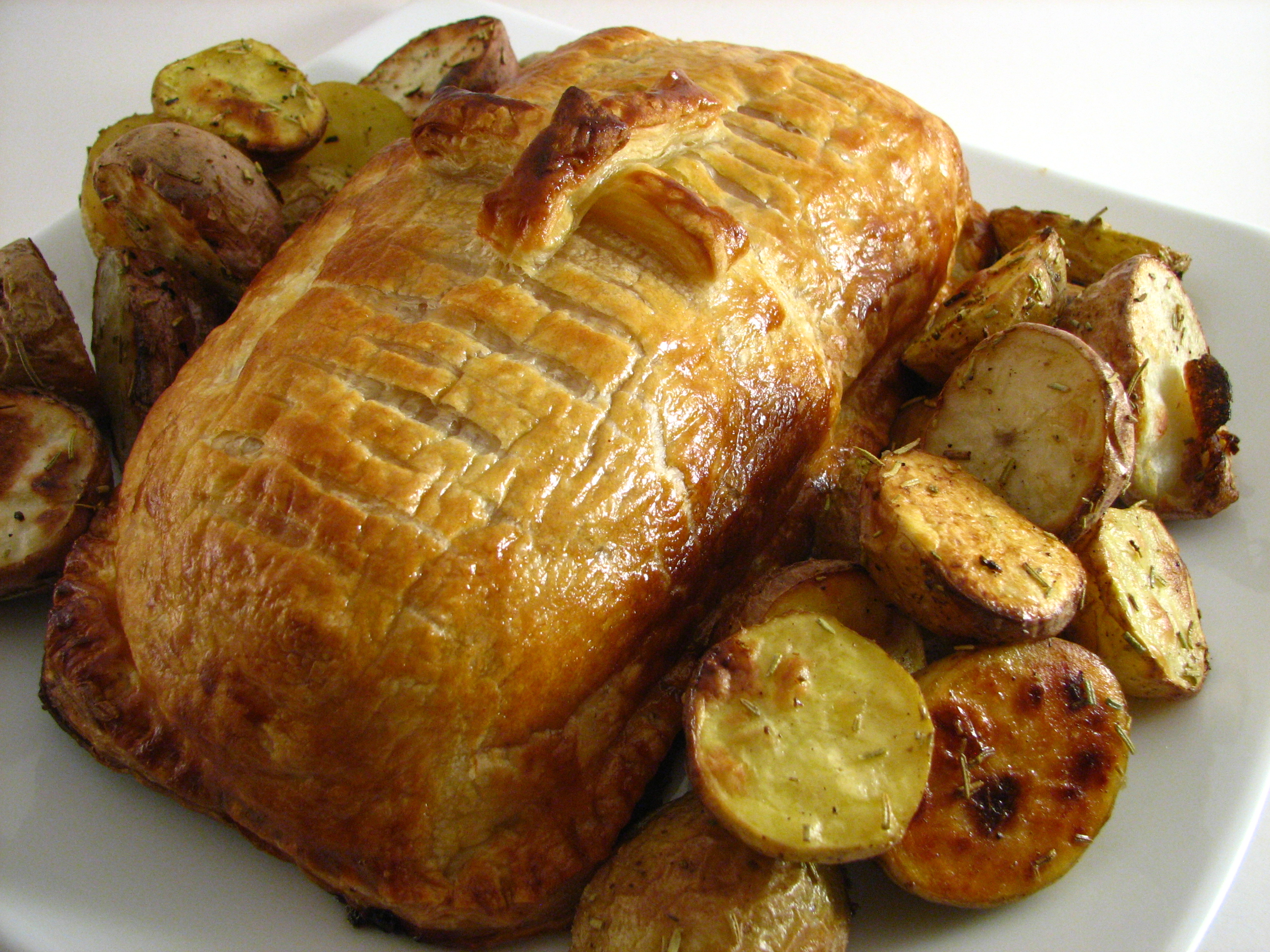
Beef Wellington, whole

Beef Wellington is a baked dish made of beef fillet and duxelles wrapped in puff pastry. Some recipes include wrapping the contents in prosciutto, or dry-cured ham, which helps retain moisture while preventing the pastry from becoming soggy; coating the beef in mustard; or substituting shortcrust pastry for puff. Classical recipes may include pâté in place of duxelles, or use of crêpes in place of prosciutto.

A whole fillet may be wrapped and baked, and then sliced for serving, or the fillet may be sliced into individual portions before wrapping and baking.

== Naming ==
The dish is presumably named after Arthur Wellesley, 1st Duke of Wellington, but the precise origin of the name is unclear, and the connection between them is unknown.

The food journalist Leah Hyslop has observed that by the time Wellington became famous, meat baked in pastry was a well-established part of English cuisine, and that the dish's similarity to the French filet de bœuf en croûte (fillet of beef in pastry) might imply that "beef Wellington" was a "timely patriotic rebranding of a trendy continental dish".

=== Early sources ===
There is a recipe for Filet à la Wellington in an Austrian cookbook of 1891 consisting of a tenderloin wrapped in pastry, with optional bacon but no mushrooms, and served with truffle sauce or pickles.

There is an 1899 reference in a menu from the Hamburg-America line. The earliest US attestation is in 1899; it also appears in the Los Angeles Times of 1903. A 1910 Polish cookbook includes Polędwica wołowa à la Wellington 'beef fillet à la Wellington' including duxelles, and served with a truffle or Madeira sauce. The author claimed that she had received this recipe from the cook of the imperial court in Vienna.

The 1923 edition of Le Répertoire de la Cuisine, a professional reference cookbook, mentions a "Wellington" recipe for beef: "Barded fillet browned in butter and in the oven, coated in poultry stuffing with dry duxelles added, placed in rolled-out puff pastry. Cooked in the oven. Garnished with peeled tomatoes, lettuce, Pommes château".

== Variations ==
In the Food Network show Good Eats, Alton Brown discusses a variant using the cheaper pork tenderloin instead of beef. A common vegetarian variation of the dish, known as "beet Wellington", replaces the beef with beetroot and has been featured on food competition shows such as MasterChef Australia.

== See also ==
- Shooter's sandwich
- List of beef dishes
- List of steak dishes
- Leongatha mushroom murders (2023) involved beef Wellingtons containing death cap mushrooms
