= Cole's Pacific Electric Buffet =

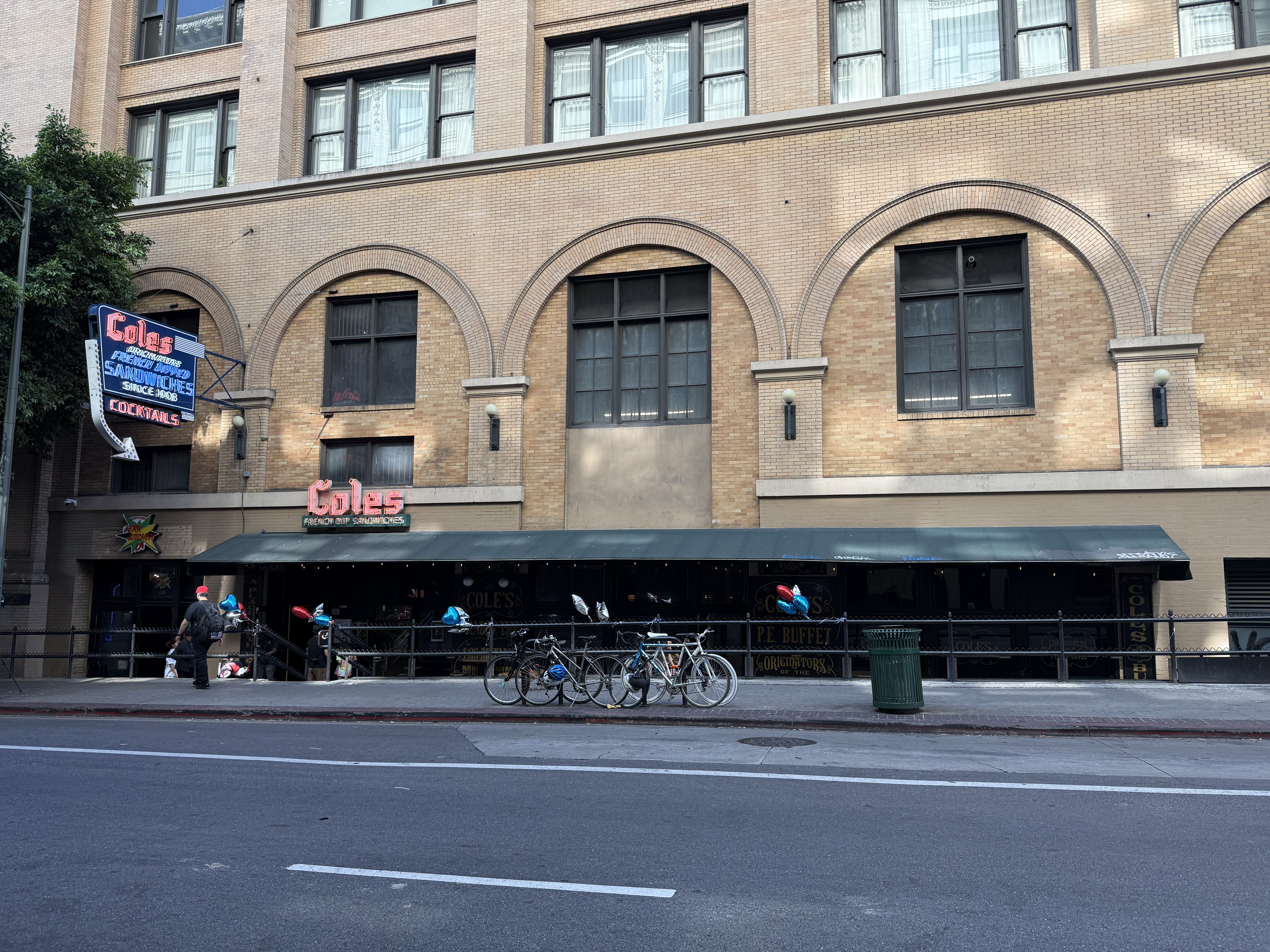
- Interactive map of Cole's Pacific Electric Buffet

Restaurant information
- Established: 1908; November 19, 2026; 3 days ago (reopening)
- Closed: March 29, 2026; 7 months ago
- Dress code: Casual
- Location: 118 East 6th Street, Los Angeles, Los Angeles, California, 90014, United States
- Coordinates: 34.04478°N 118.24943°W
- Website: coles.la

Cole's Pacific Electric Buffet, also known as Cole's P.E. Buffet and Cole's French Dip, is a restaurant and bar located at 118 East 6th Street in the Historic Core of downtown Los Angeles, California. Opened in 1908, it is the oldest restaurant in Los Angeles operating from the same location since its founding.

== History ==
Cole's was founded in 1908 by Henry Cole on the ground floor of the Pacific Electric Building, which served as the main terminal for the Pacific Electric Railway. Cole's table tops were made from the varnished doors of retired Red Cars of the Pacific Electric Railway.

Cole's claims that the French dip sandwich was invented at Cole's the year it opened. Nearby Philippe's makes the same claim. Some have suggested that Philippe's is correct, as the sandwich was named "French" dip because of the restaurant's proprietor's French heritage. According to carvers at Cole's, Henry Cole first dipped the French bread in jus at the request of a customer who had recently had dental work. The bread was too hard and it hurt the customer's teeth, so Henry dipped the bread to soften it. Other customers requested Cole do the same for them - and thus the French dip was born.

Cole's was designated a Los Angeles Historic-Cultural Monument in 1989. It later shut down for remodeling on March 15, 2007, with the new owner claiming the restaurant would reopen in time for its 100th anniversary in January 2008. The project, however, was delayed, and Cole's did not reopen until December 2008. The original tables were removed and reportedly moved to the developer's corporate headquarters above Clifton's Cafeteria as part of this renovation.

=== Closure and reopening ===
The restaurant announced on July 7, 2025 that it would close on August 3, 2025, with no plans to reopen. Due to an influx of customers following that announcement, the closing date was repeatedly delayed, with it first being pushed back to September 2025, then to November 1, 2025, then to December 31, 2025, and then to January 31, 2026.

Cole's finally closed on March 29, 2026, marking the occasion with a series of collaborations with other prominent Los Angeles restaurants like Father's Office and Guelaguetza offering remixed version of items from the Cole's menu. While the owners set a minimum price tag of $500,000 for the restaurant, they wanted the new buyer to continue the Cole's legacy instead of merely opening a new concept within the space, and while a number of buyers have expressed interest in buying the restaurant, none have yet to close escrow.

In October 2026, the Los Angeles Times announced that restaurateurs Jeremy Fall and Sean Maloney were set to acquire Cole's from Pouring With Heart, with the restaurant reopening in late November once they receive a full liquor license. While the reopened restaurant will continue to offer its classic offerings and will preserve its old fixtures, it will also include additional seating and more upscale dining options.

Cole's reopened to the public on November 19, 2026, doing so on the same day as the Original Pantry Cafe.

== In popular culture ==
Cole's resembled the bar from Who Framed Roger Rabbit, complete with reference to “French dip” on menu.

Cole's was featured in Episode 2, Season 3 of The Lincoln Lawyer, where Mickey Haller debated with Andrea Freeman over who invented the French Dip: Cole's or Philippe's.

== Gallery ==
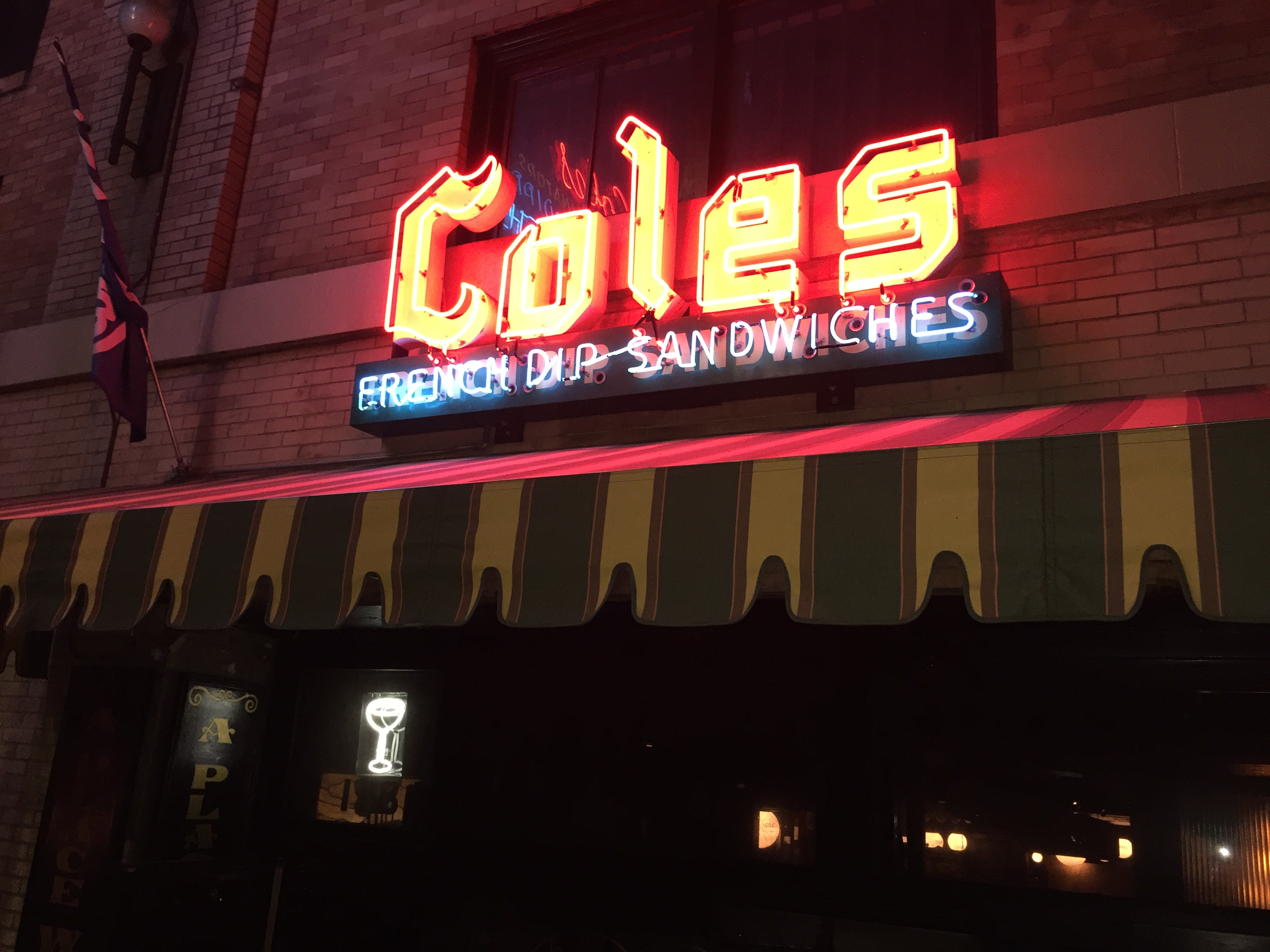
Exterior at night

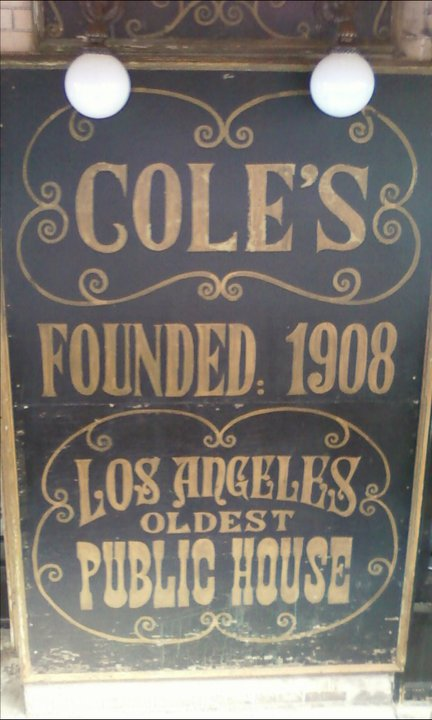
Sign with claim to being the oldest bar in Los Angeles

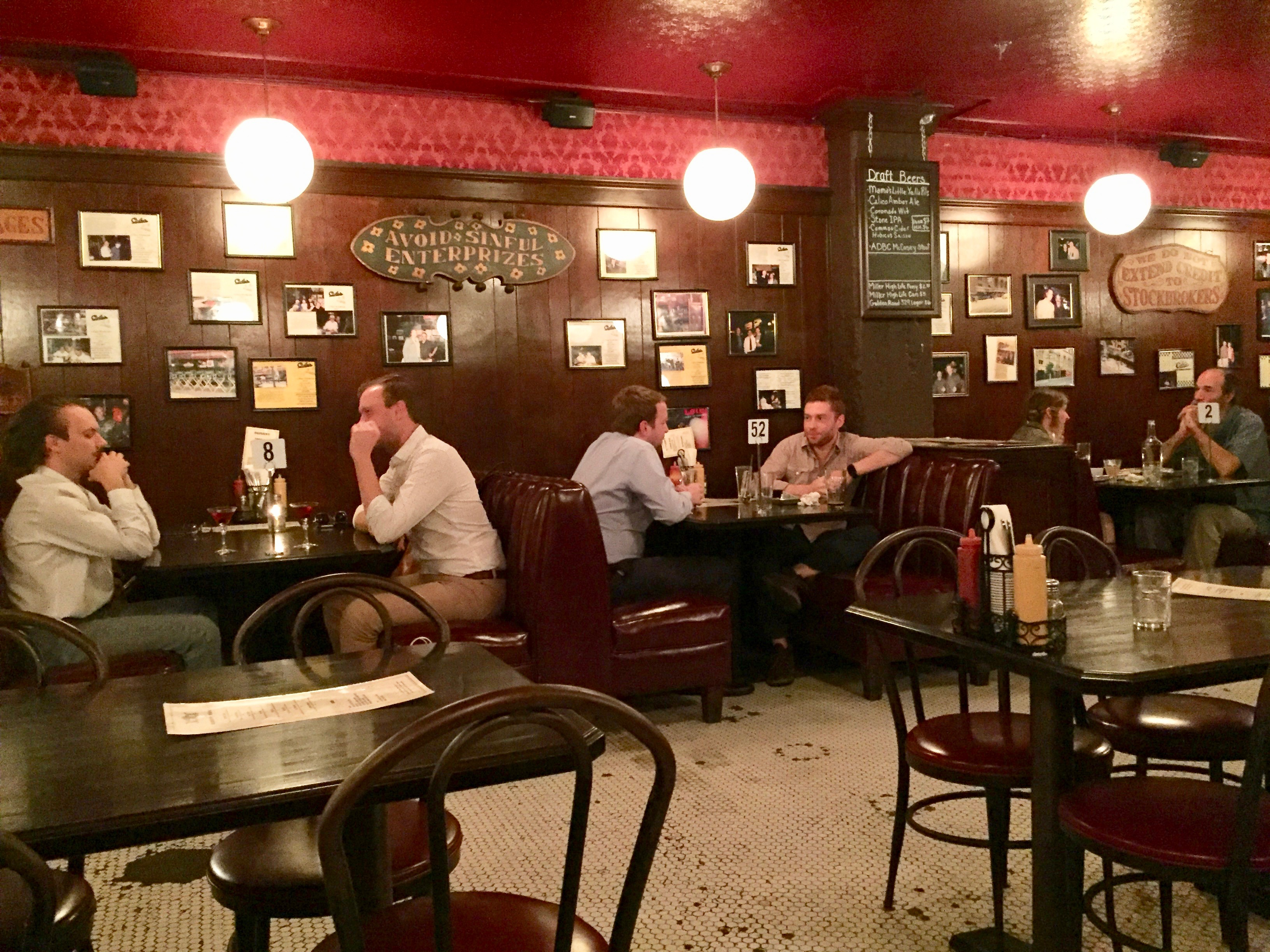
Inside in 2016
