= French dip =

Hot beef sandwich on a roll with broth

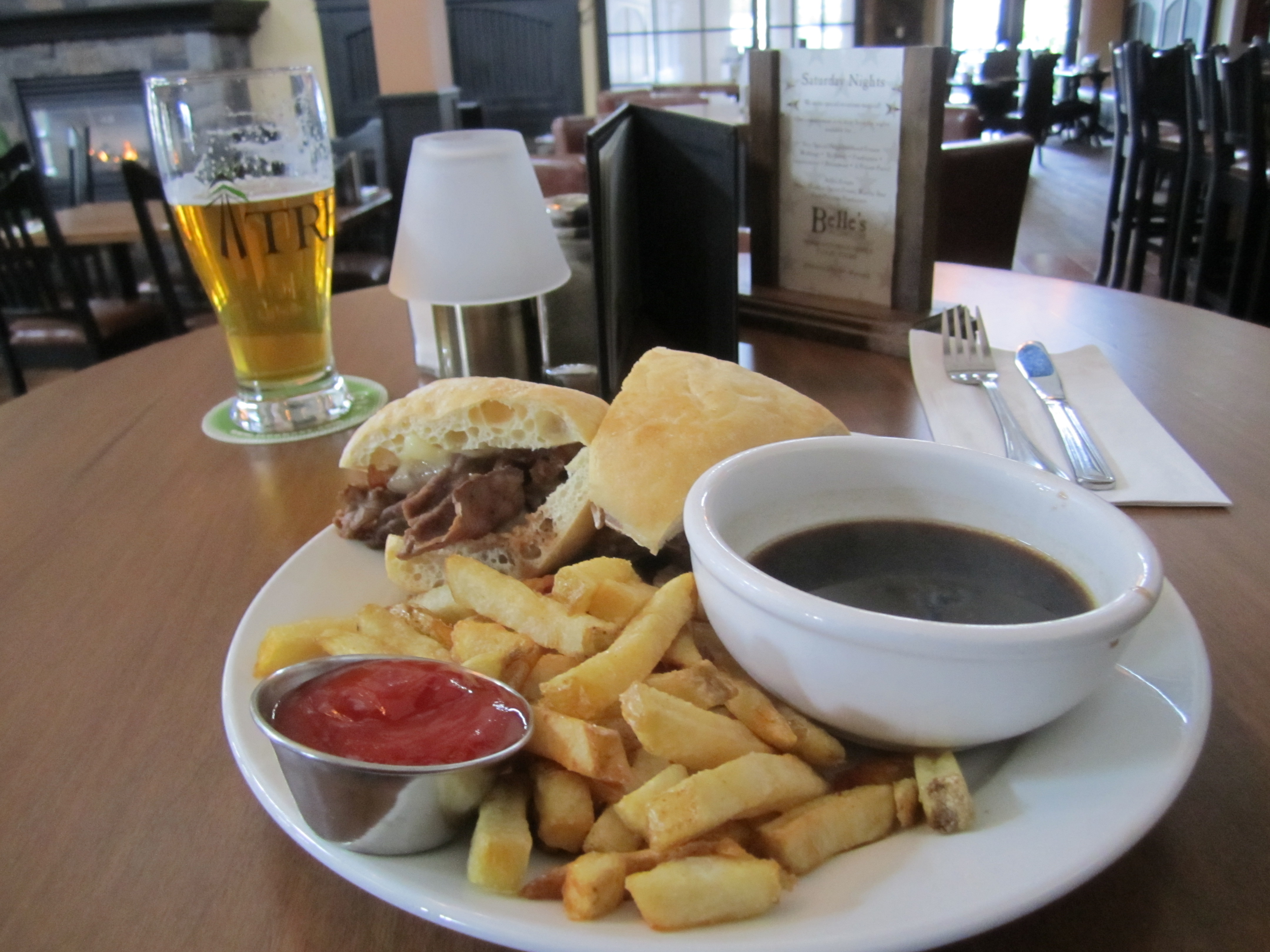
- Roast beef dip au jus, with french fries
- Alternative names: Beef dip
- Type: Sandwich
- Course: Main
- Place of origin: United States
- Region or state: Los Angeles, California
- Created by: Multiple claims
- Main ingredients: Baguette, roast beef, beef broth
- Variations: With cheese

A French dip sandwich, also known as a beef dip, is a hot sandwich consisting of thinly sliced roast beef (or, sometimes, other meats) on a "French roll" or baguette.

A popular variation is to top with Swiss cheese, onions, and a dipping container of beef broth produced from the cooking process (termed au jus, "with juice"). Beef stock, a light beef gravy, or beef consommé is sometimes substituted. The sandwich is most commonly served with a cup on the side, into which the sandwich is dipped as it is eaten, although this is not how the sandwich came into contact with the jus in the various legends of its origin.

The sandwich is an American invention, with the name seeming to refer to the style of bread.

== History ==
Two Los Angeles restaurants have claimed to have created the French dip sandwich: Cole's Pacific Electric Buffet and Philippe the Original. Philippe's website describes the dish as a "specialty of the house", and the words "Home of the Original French Dip Sandwich" are present in the restaurant's logo. At Phillippe's the sandwich is served "double dipped", where the cut faces of the roll are dipped in the hot beef juices before the sandwich is assembled (a "single dipped" version in which only the bottom half of the roll is dipped is also offered), while at Cole's it is served "dry" with a side of beef juices. The sandwich can also be requested "wet", where the entire sandwich is dipped before serving, at either establishment. Both restaurants feature their own brand of spicy mustard.

The controversy over who originated the sandwich remains unresolved. Both restaurants were established in 1908. However, Cole's claims to have originated the sandwich shortly after the restaurant opened in 1908, while Philippe's claims that owner Philippe Mathieu invented it in 1918. Neither restaurant cites any period references. A November 1929 reference in Modern Mechanics and Inventions, "War Veteran Erects Sand-bagged Dugout as Eating Place in Los Angeles" (which cites the dish at the Dugout) may be the first mention of the dish in print.

The story of the sandwich's invention by Philippe's has several variants: some sources say that it was first created by a cook or a server who, while preparing a sandwich for a police officer or fireman, accidentally dropped it into a pan of meat drippings. The patron liked it, and the dish surged in popularity shortly after its invention. Other accounts say that a customer who did not want some meat drippings to go to waste requested his sandwich be dipped in them. Still others say that a chef dipped a sandwich into a pan of meat drippings after a customer complained that the bread was stale. Cole's account states that the sandwich was invented by a sympathetic chef, Jack Garlinghouse, for a customer who was complaining of sore gums. Some accounts tell Philippe's version of events, but assign the location to Cole's. The mystery of the sandwich's invention might not be solved due to a lack of information and observable evidence.

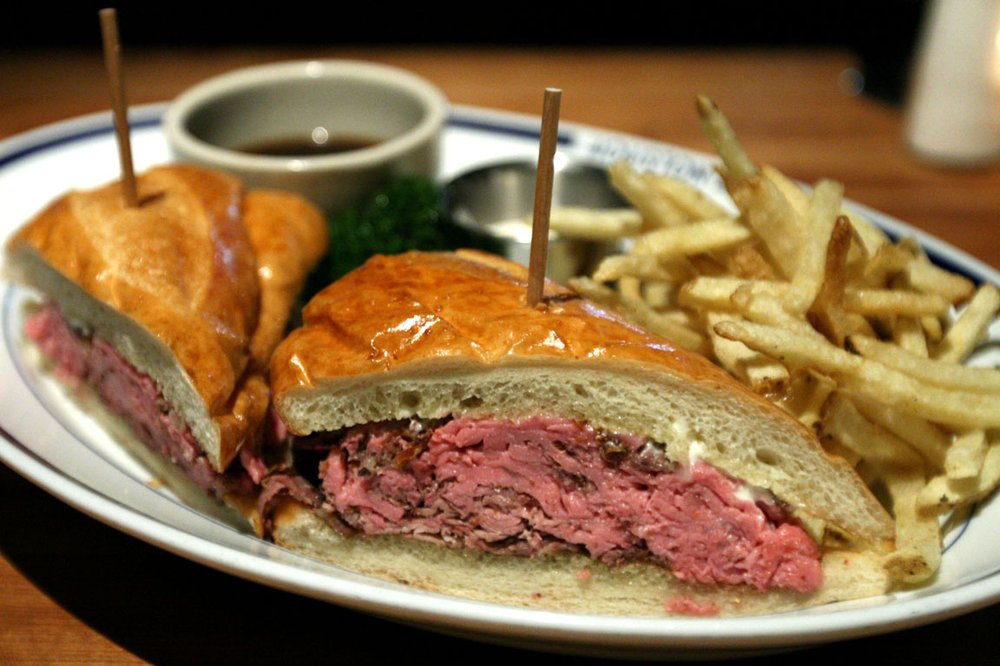
A French dip

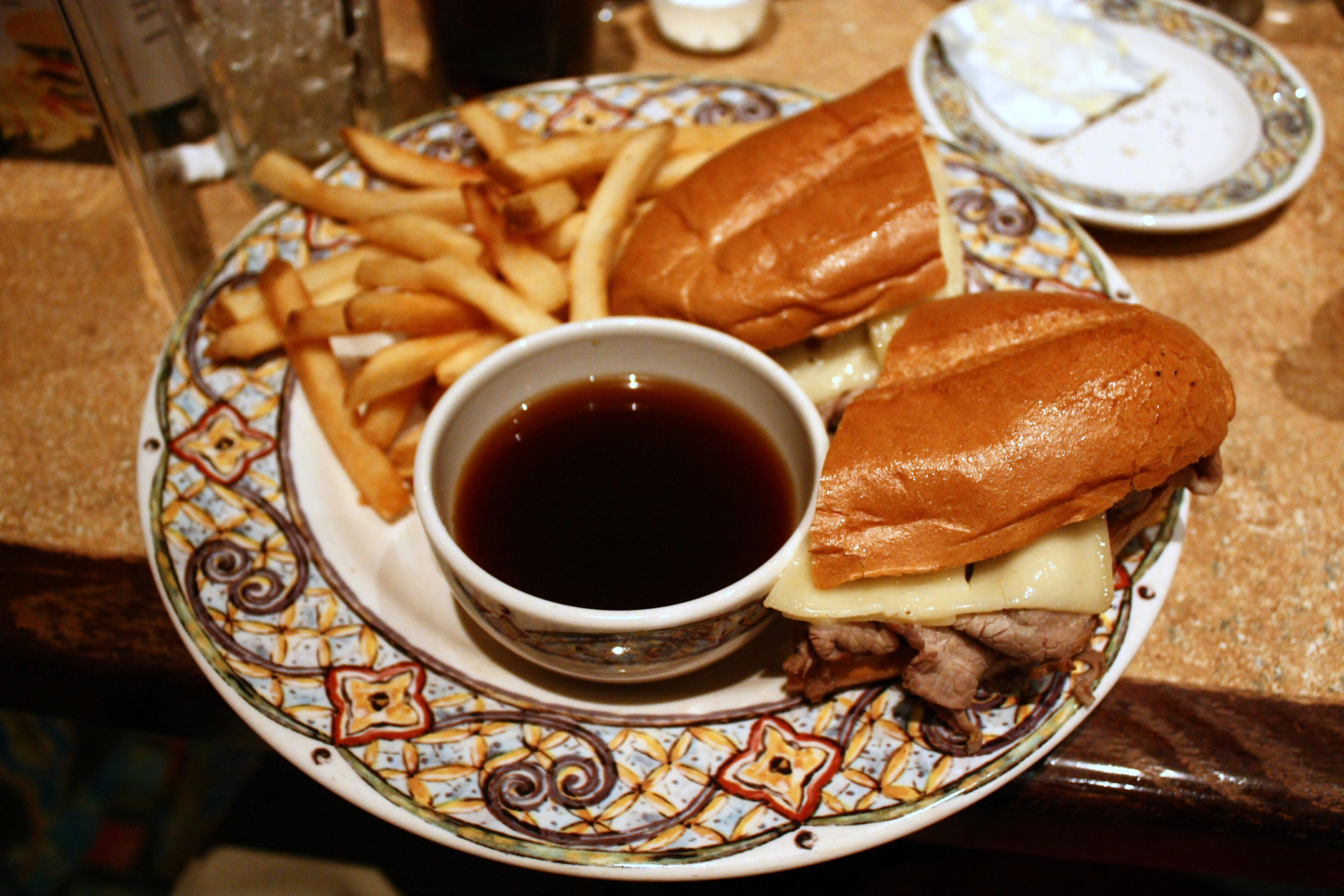
French dip, with bowl of jus for dipping

== See also ==
- Cheesesteak
- Beef on weck
- Italian beef, a similar sandwich which is dipped in the juices
- List of American sandwiches
- List of sandwiches
- List of steak dishes
- Roast beef sandwich
- Steak sandwich
