= Shooter's sandwich =

Steak sandwich of English origin

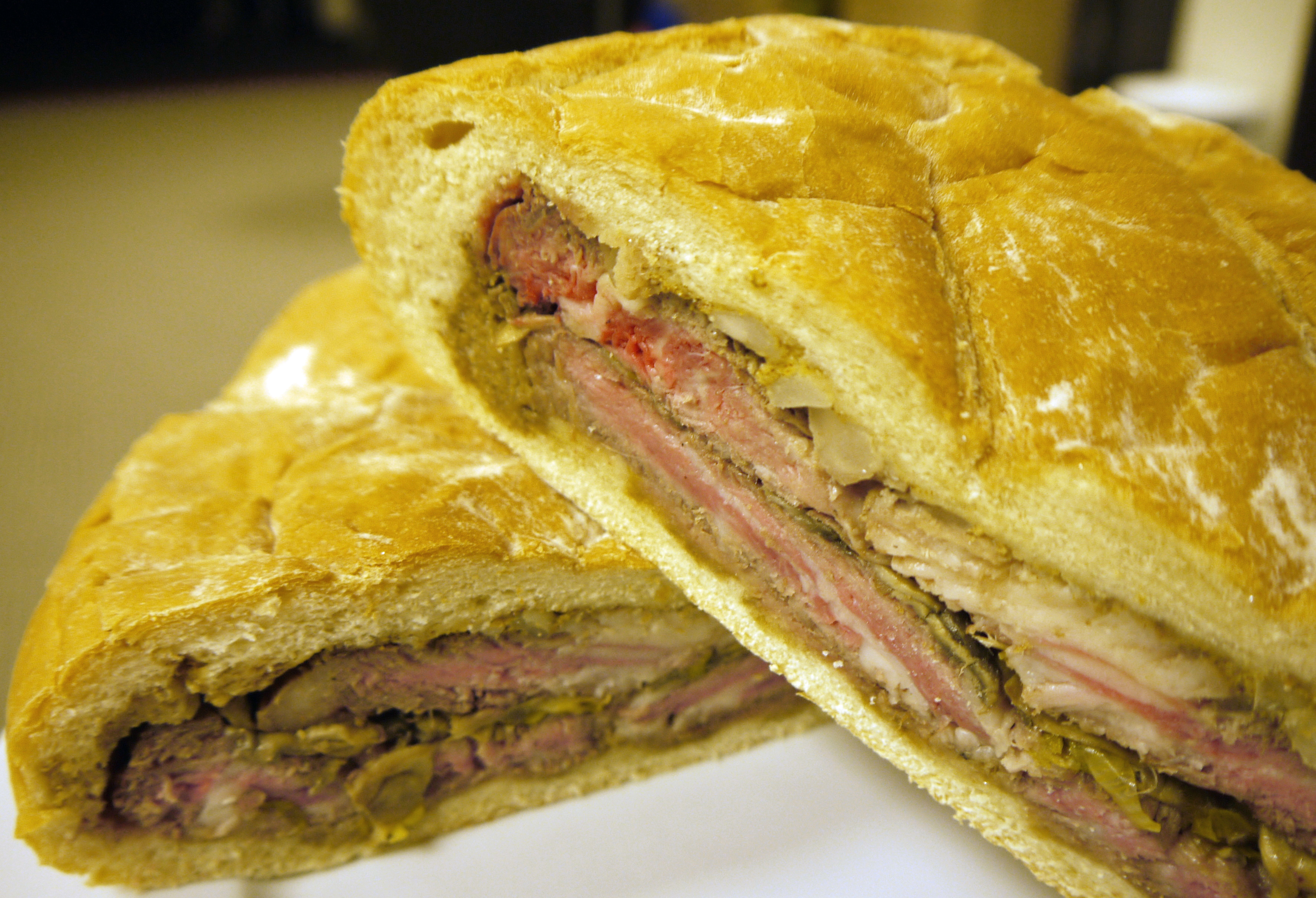
- A shooter's sandwich
- Type: Sandwich
- Place of origin: England
- Invented: Edwardian era
- Main ingredients: Steak
- Ingredients generally used: Mushrooms, salt, and pepper
- Similar dishes: Beef Wellington

The shooter's sandwich is a steak sandwich consisting of cooked steak and mushrooms placed inside a hollowed-out loaf of bread and then weighted down. This popular English sandwich is likened to beef Wellington using bread rather than pastry.

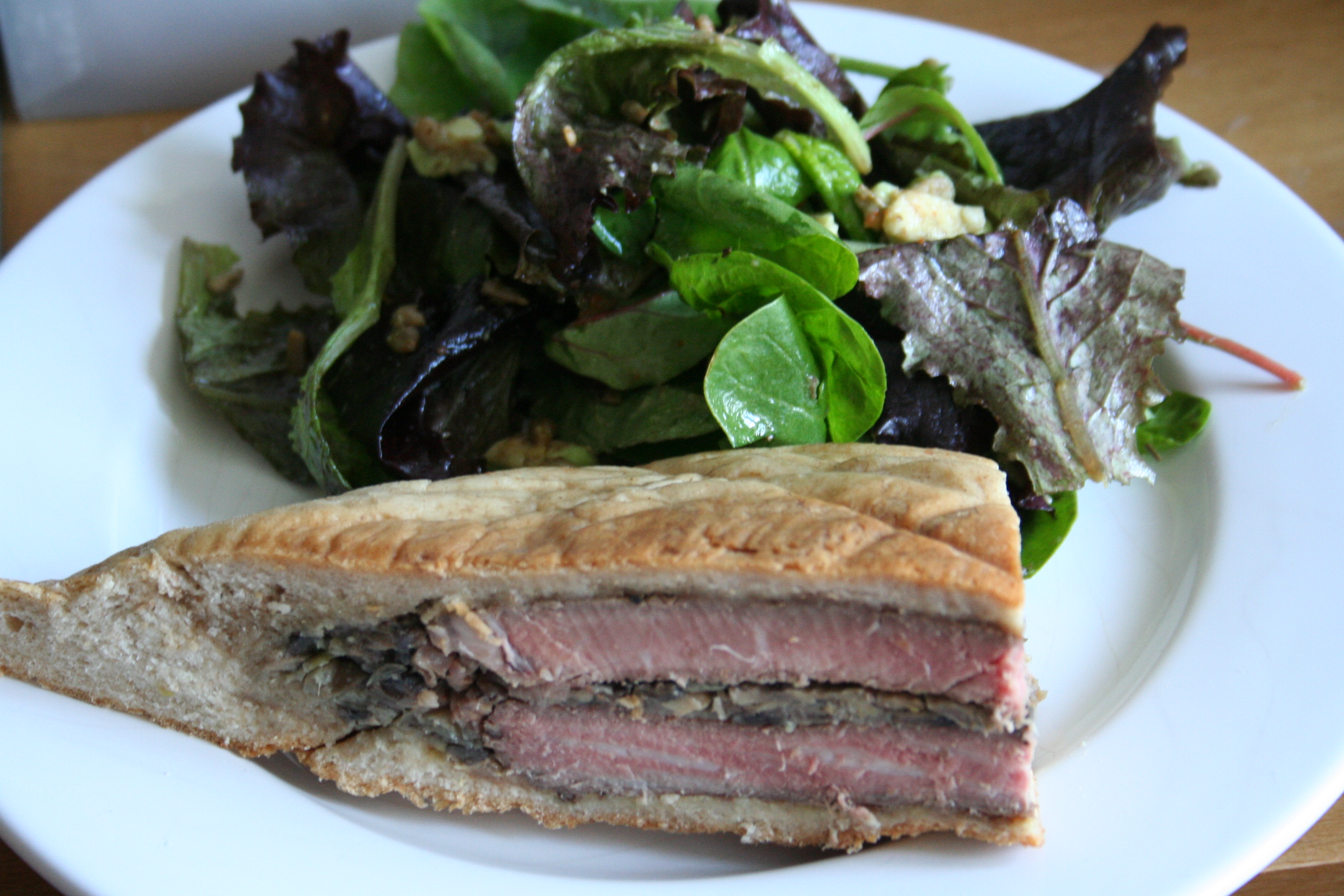
A shooter's sandwich with salad

A shooter's sandwich is prepared by filling a long, hollowed-out loaf of bread with cooked filet mignon steak, cooked mushrooms, salt, and pepper. Weights are then placed atop the sandwich to squeeze it down. Typically the sandwich is weighted down overnight, which causes meat juices to soak into the bread.

Other cuts of beef, such as rump steak, ribeye, and sirloin are also used to prepare the item. Cooked onions or shallots are sometimes used, as is duxelles, a sautéed preparation of mushrooms, onions or shallots, and herbs, reduced to a paste. Dijon mustard and horseradish are sometimes used as accompanying condiments.

== History ==
The shooter's sandwich originated in England during the Edwardian era. It was created as a way for hunters to take a hearty lunch with them. It is now enjoyed both for at-home meals or as a portable food item when travelling.

The sandwich became a minor Internet meme after an April 7, 2010 article written by Tim Hayward and published by The Guardian declared the shooter's sandwich the best sandwich in the world. The Guardian's article also described the sandwich as a "triumph of Edwardian cuisine".

== See also ==
- List of sandwiches
- List of steak dishes
- Toast sandwich
- Pie iron
