= Steak sandwich =

Type of sandwich

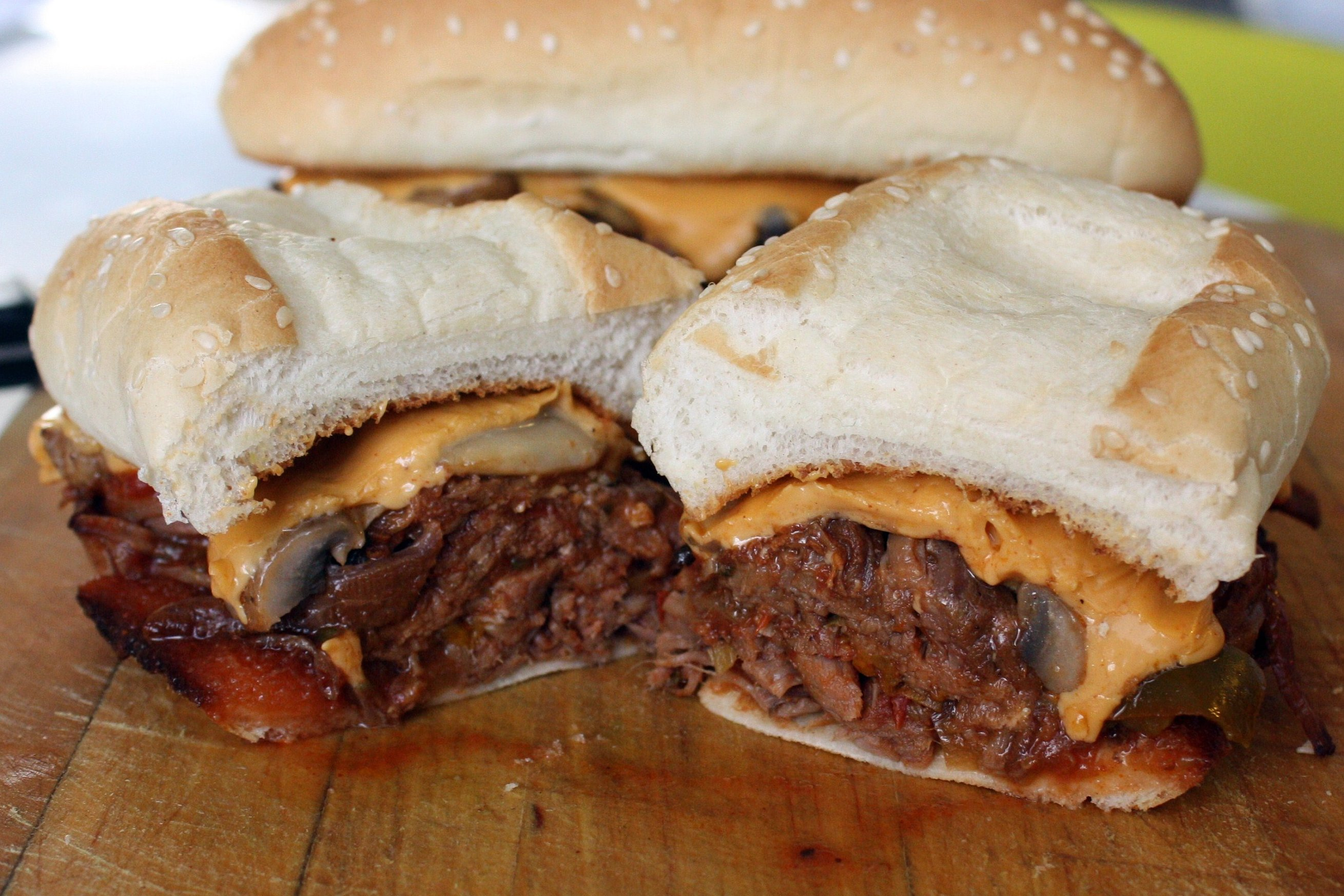
- A steak sandwich with shredded steak, cheese, mushrooms, onions, peppers and tomatoes
- Type: Sandwich
- Course: Main course
- Main ingredients: Steak, bread
- Variations: Multiple

A steak sandwich is a sandwich prepared with thinly-sliced steak that has been broiled, fried, grilled, barbecued or seared using steel grates or gridirons, then served on bread or a roll. Some variations use thin slices of roast beef or prime rib.

In the US, steak sandwiches are sometimes served with toppings of cheese, onions, mushrooms, peppers, tomatoes, lettuce, and in some instances fried eggs, coleslaw, and french fries. Some are served with a dipping sauce.

According to the Library of Congress, the first steak sandwich sold in the United States was at Louis' Lunch of New Haven, Connecticut.

== Cheesesteak ==
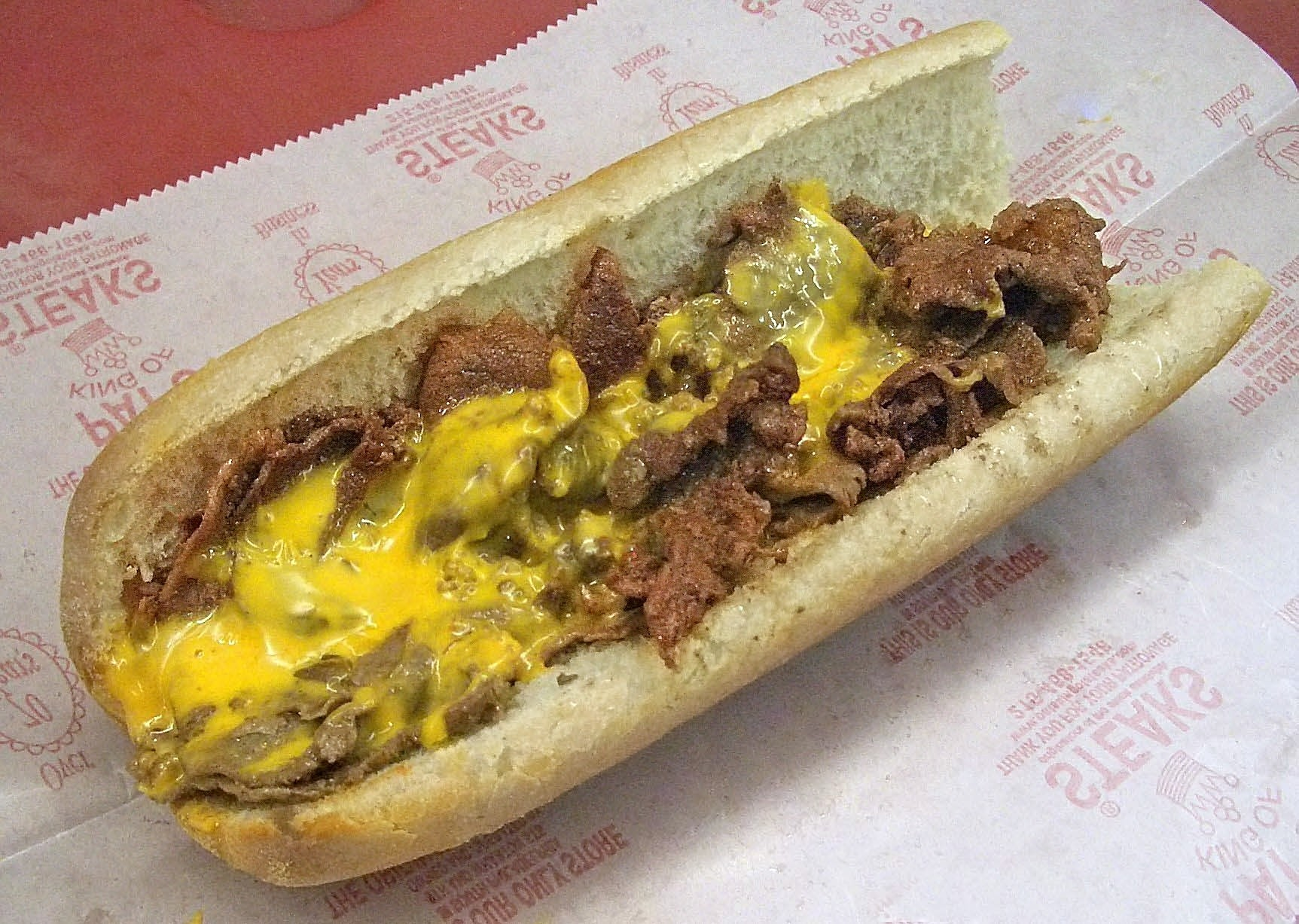
A cheesesteak sandwich

A cheesesteak, or steak and cheese, is made from thinly sliced pieces of steak and melted cheese in a long roll. The cheesesteak is one of the favorite foods of the city of Philadelphia, Pennsylvania. It can be found in most parts of the U.S. outside the Philadelphia area, often sold as a "Philadelphia" or "Philly Cheesesteak", even when prepared in a manner different from that customary in the city. Variations include the type of condiments, including grilled onions and peppers, the type of cheese used, or the type of roll.

== Italian beef ==
An Italian beef sandwich features thin slices of seasoned roast beef, dripping with meat juices, on a dense, long Italian-style roll, believed to have originated in Chicago, where its history dates back at least to the 1930s. The bread itself is often dipped (or double-dipped) into the jus the meat is cooked in, and the sandwich is typically topped off with Chicago-style giardiniera or sauteed, green Italian sweet peppers. Despite the name, it is almost completely unknown in Italy.

== French dip ==
A French dip sandwich is an American hot sandwich, also known as a beef dip (especially in Canada), consisting of thinly sliced roast beef (or, sometimes, other meats such as pastrami or corned beef) on a French roll or baguette. It is usually served au jus ("with juice"), that is, with beef juice from the cooking process. Though it can be found in many parts of the U.S. and Canada, the sandwich originated in Los Angeles, California, in the first decades of the twentieth century. Despite the name, it is almost completely unknown in France.

== Roast beef ==
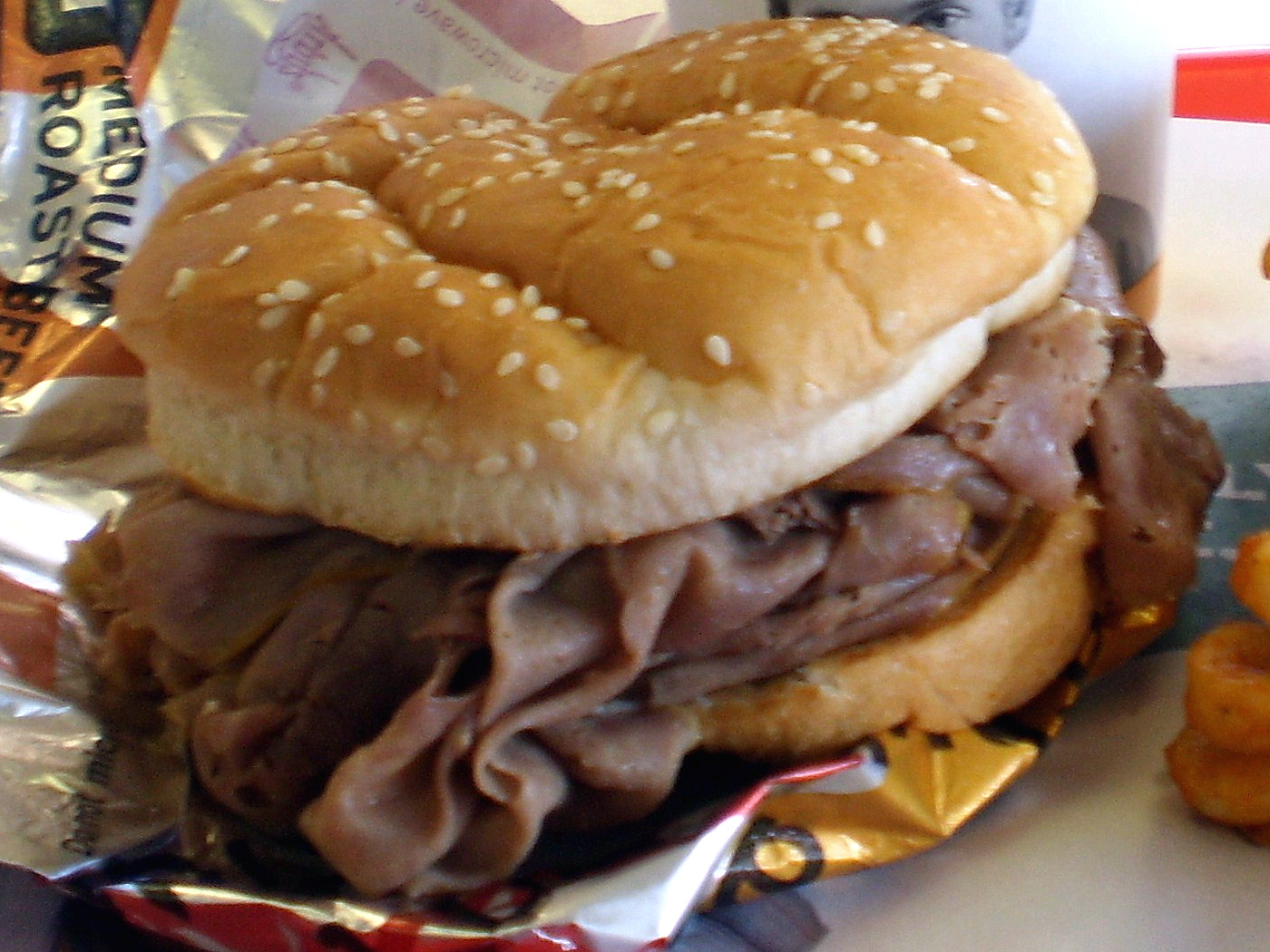
An Arby's roast beef sandwich

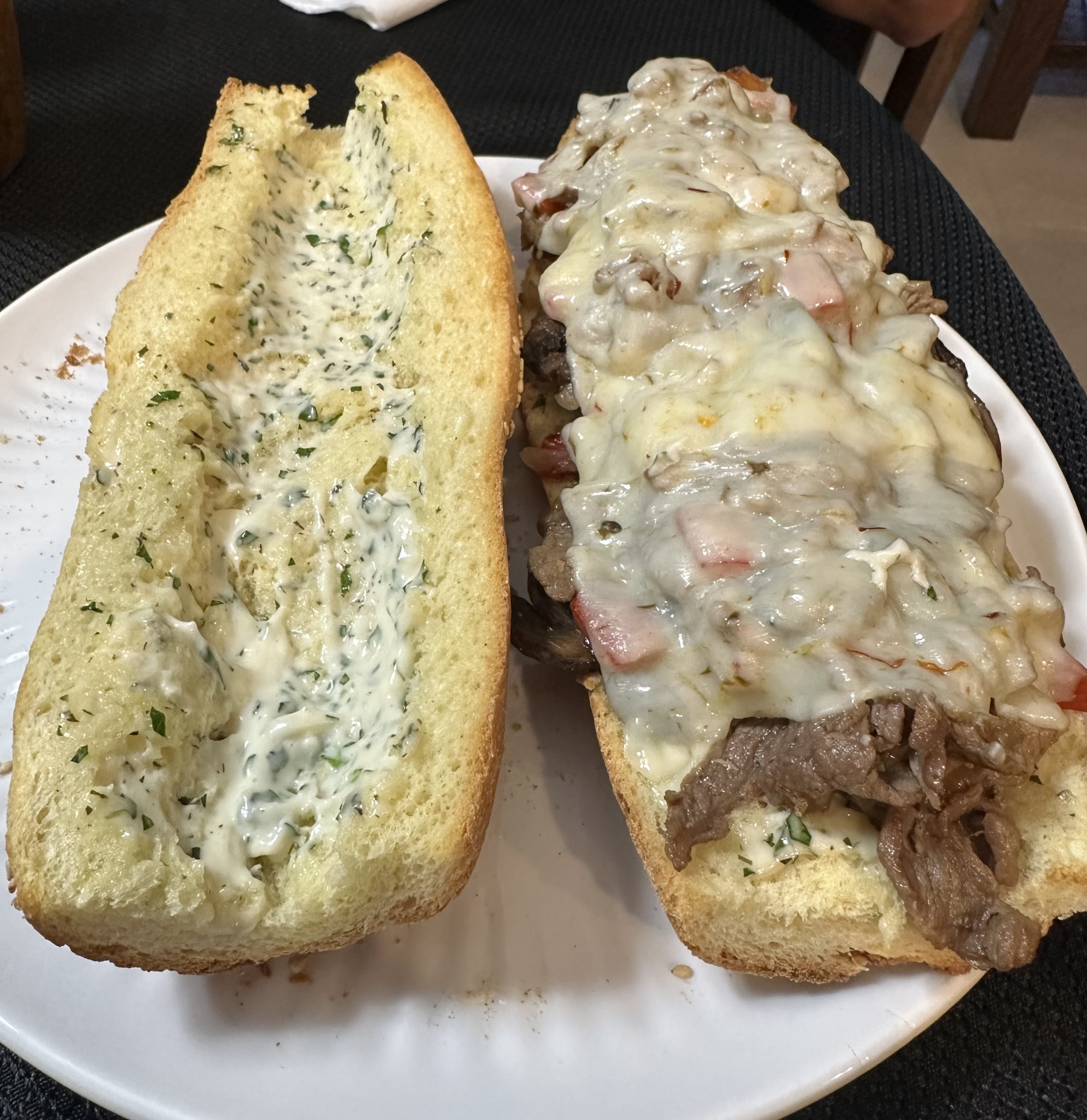
Steak sandwich with provolone cheese and garlic aioli

A roast beef sandwich is a sandwich that is made out of sliced roast beef or sometimes beef loaf. It is sold at many diners in the U.S., as well as fast food chains, such as Arby's and Roy Rogers Restaurants. This style of sandwich often comes on a hamburger bun and may be topped with barbecue sauce and/or melted American cheese.

== Beef on weck ==
A beef on weck is a variety of sandwich found primarily in Western New York. It is made with roast beef on a kummelweck roll. The meat on the sandwich is traditionally served rare, thin-cut, with the top bun getting a dip au jus. Accompaniments include horseradish, a dill pickle spear, and French fries.

== Steak bomb ==
A steak bomb is a hot sub sandwich consisting of melted provolone or mozzarella cheese with grilled onions, sautéed red and green bell peppers, mushrooms, and peppered shaved steak all on a sub sandwich roll. It is a variation on the steak submarine sandwich, as is the cheese steak. It is most closely associated with the New England region of the United States, where steak sandwiches are made by quickly grilling shaved steak on a griddle and then adding cheese, or grilling the steak together with peppers and onions or mushrooms. If all three are combined it becomes a steak bomb. The addition of salami or other preserved meats or pickles is optional and exact recipes and proportions vary widely. Nearly every pizzeria and sub shop in New England has its own version of the various steak sandwiches and the steak bomb.

== Similarly-named dishes ==
An Australian steak sandwich is a piece of steak, typically grilled or barbecued, on a bun or sliced bread. It may be topped with fried onions, lettuce, tomato, tinned beetroot and barbecue sauce or tomato sauce/tomato ketchup. Cheese, a fried egg, bacon or pineapple might also be added.

== See also ==
- Chivito sandwich
- Chicken sandwich
- Hamburger
- Pepito (sandwich)
- Sausage sandwich
- Shooter's sandwich
- Submarine sandwich
- List of sandwiches
