= Au jus =

Meat gravy made from cooking juices

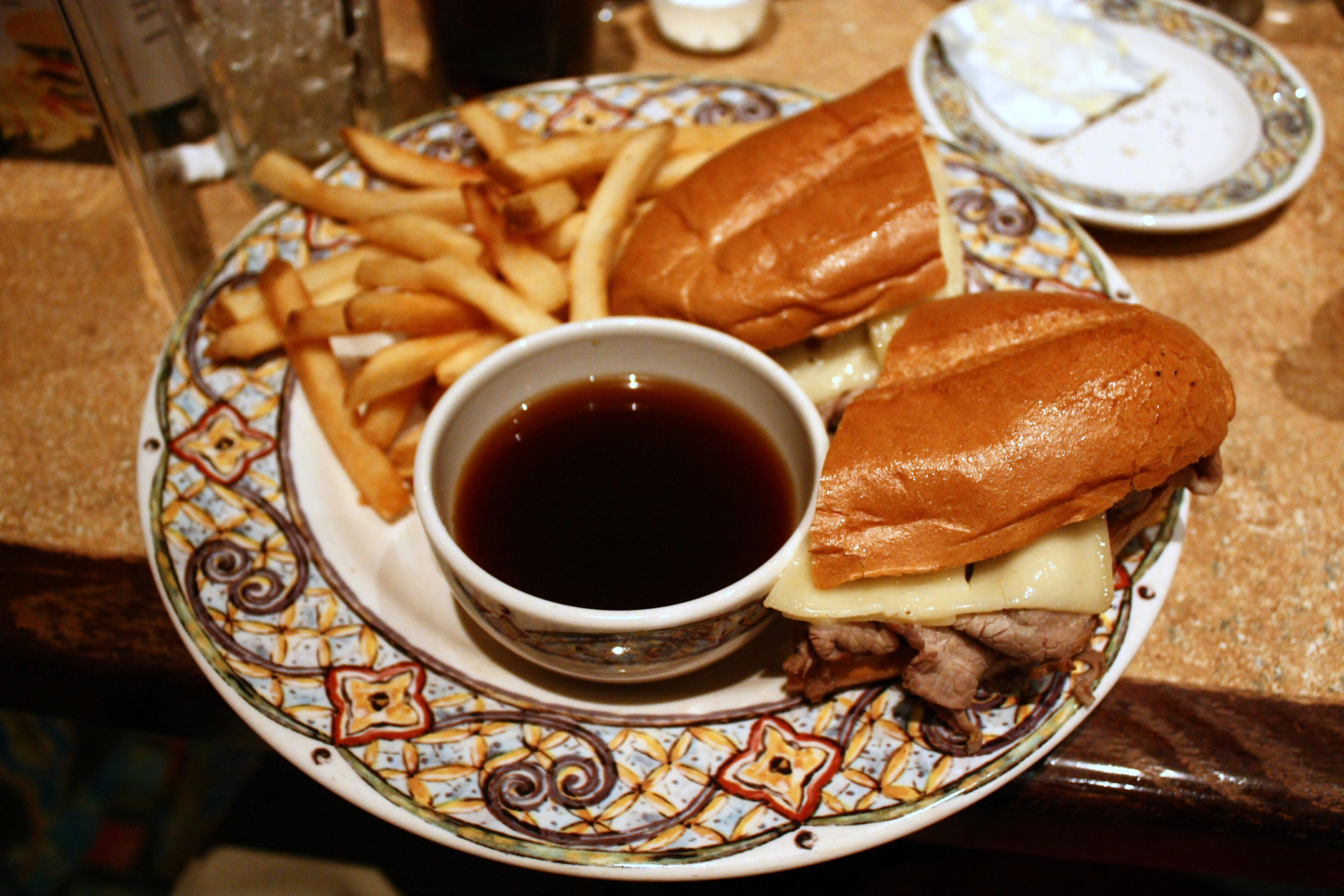
- French dip beef sandwich, with bowl of jus for dipping
- Type: Sauce, broth
- Place of origin: France

Au jus (French: [o ʒy]) is a French culinary term meaning "with juice". It refers to meat dishes prepared or served together with a light broth or gravy, made from the fluids secreted by the meat as it is cooked. In French cuisine, cooking au jus is a natural way to enhance the flavour of dishes, mainly chicken, veal, and lamb. In American cuisine, the term is sometimes used to refer to a light sauce for beef recipes, which may be served with the food or placed on the side for dipping.

== Ingredients and preparation ==
To prepare a natural jus, the cook may skim off the fat from the juices left after cooking and bring the remaining meat stock and water to a boil. Jus can be frozen for six months or longer, but the flavour may suffer after this time.

Au jus recipes in the United States often use soy sauce, Worcestershire sauce, salt, pepper, white or brown sugar, garlic, beets, carrots, onions, or other ingredients to make something more like a gravy. The American jus is sometimes prepared separately, rather than being produced naturally by the food being cooked. An example could be a beef jus made by reducing beef stock to a concentrated form (also known as Glace de Viande) to accompany a meat dish. It is typically served with the French dip sandwich.

Jus can also be made by extracting the juice from the original meat and combining it with another liquid e.g. red wine (thus forming a red wine jus).

A powdered product described as jus is also sold and is rubbed into the meat before cooking or added afterwards. Powdered forms generally use a combination of salt, dried onion, and sometimes sugar as primary flavoring agents.

== Use as noun ==
In the United States, the phrase au jus is often used as a noun, owing to its having been adapted in culinary references into the noun form: Rather than a "sandwich au jus", the menu may read "sandwich with au jus".

== See also ==
- List of dips
- French dip, an American beef sandwich served au jus
